= Barack Obama religion conspiracy theories =

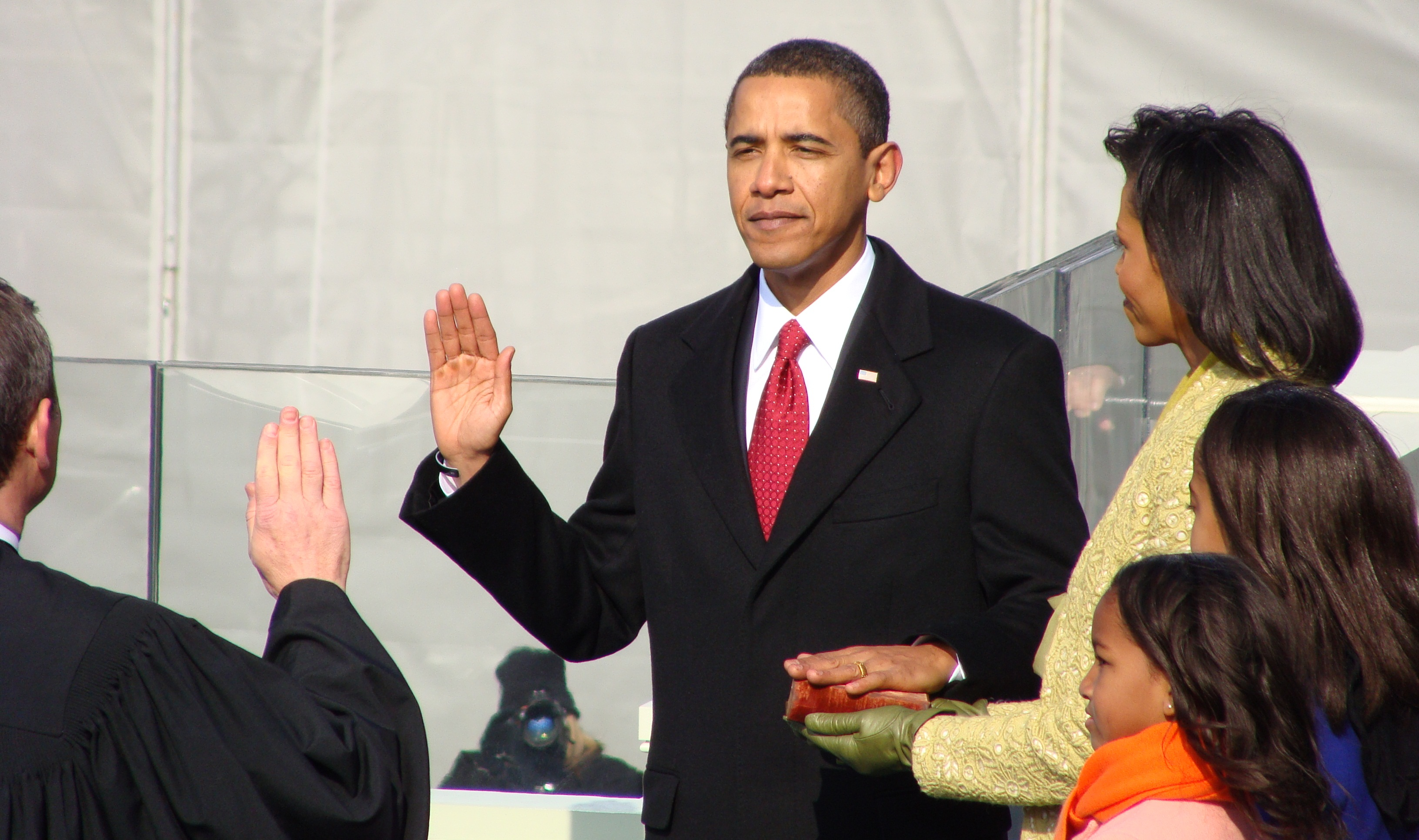
Barack Obama swearing the oath of office of the president of the United States using the Bible of Abraham Lincoln

Allegations that Barack Obama secretly practices Islam, or that he is the antichrist of Christian eschatology, or covertly holds some other esoteric religious position, have been suggested since he campaigned for the U.S. Senate in 2004 and proliferated after his election as President of the United States in 2008. As with conspiracy theories surrounding his citizenship status, the claims are promoted by various political opponents, with American bloggers and conservative talk radio hosts particularly promoting the theories.

Belief in these claims in the public sphere endured and, in some cases, even expanded during Obama's presidency according to the Pew Research Center, with 17% of Americans (including one third of conservative Republicans) believing him to be a Muslim in a 2012 poll.

Obama practices Protestant Christianity. He attended Black churches while in his twenties. From 1992 until 2008, he was a member of the Trinity United Church of Christ—a Reformed denomination. Obama left it in the wake of the Jeremiah Wright controversy. Since then, he has attended various Protestant churches, including Baptist, Methodist, and Episcopalian churches.

== Background ==
In the political culture of the United States, mythologies of nativism and the immigrant identity of many citizens have often been in tension. The constitution contains a natural-born-citizen clause stating that any person born subsequent to the founding of the United States must be a "natural born Citizen" to be eligible to hold the office of president.

As a result of the absence of a clear definition of a "natural born Citizen", a history developed of claims against presidents and presidential candidates asserting that citizenship of other nations held in addition to US citizenship, or aspects of ethnicity or religion, made them constitutionally unqualified to hold the office. Anti-Semitic pamphleteer Robert Edward Edmondson published Roosevelt's Jewish Ancestry—"He Is Not One Of Us!" in 1939 in support of existing propaganda concerning President Franklin D. Roosevelt's religion and heritage and Roy Zachary, a leader of the Silver Legion of America, linked Roosevelt to the Crypto-Judaism of sixteenth-century Spain in public speeches.

Nazi German caricatures of Roosevelt also depicted him as Jewish. In the twenty-first century, similar approaches were developed for Barack Obama and Islam.

== Claims that Obama secretly practices Islam ==
According to the Los Angeles Times, false rumors saying that Obama was secretly a Muslim started during his campaign for the United States Senate in 2004 and had expanded through viral e-mails by 2006. The Times compared these rumors to earlier false rumors about 2000 presidential candidate John McCain fathering a mixed race child out of wedlock. The rumors were subsequently promoted by conservative talk show hosts, including Michael Savage.

In December 2007, the Hillary Clinton campaign asked a volunteer county coordinator to step down after she forwarded an e-mail message which repeated the false rumor that Obama was Muslim. In June 2008, New York City mayor Michael Bloomberg, himself Jewish, spoke out to Jewish voters in Florida against false e-mail rumors which said that Obama was secretly a Muslim and did not support Israel. Bloomberg said: "I hope all of you will join me throughout this campaign in strongly speaking out against this fear mongering, no matter who you'll be voting for."

In 2015, Taha al-Lahibi, a former member of the Iraqi parliament known for promoting fringe conspiracy theories, claimed that Obama was "the son of a Shiite Kenyan father." These unfounded claims do not have broad support among Iraqis, and al-Lahibi's claim prompted mockery.

Obama was baptized into the United Church of Christ (UCC) denomination and formally joined it in 1988. He left the UCC in 2008 because of the Rev. Jeremiah Wright controversy. He later worshiped with a Southern Baptist pastor at Camp David but has not become a formal member of any church since 2008.

According to his own profession and some others, Obama is a practicing Christian. Obama said he was chiefly raised by his mother and her Christian parents. He characterized his father, Barack Obama Sr., with whom he lived only as a baby, as being a Muslim-raised atheist. Also, his stepfather, Lolo Soetoro, with whom he lived during his early childhood, was nominally Muslim. This familial connection to Islam, among other things, is a basis of claims that Obama secretly practices Islam.

=== Qur'an claim ===
A chain e-mail circulating during the presidential campaign claimed that Obama took his oath of office as a U.S. Senator in 2005 while placing his hand on a Qur'an rather than a Bible. This claim is false, as Obama was sworn into office using a Bible that he owned. The claim may have been inspired by a photo-op re-enactment of the 2007 swearing-in of U.S. Representative Keith Ellison of Minnesota, who used a Qur'an that had belonged to Thomas Jefferson.

=== Madrasa claim ===
An early version of a rumor that Obama had "spent at least four years in a so-called madrasa, or Muslim seminary, in Indonesia" appeared in an article published by Insight on the News, a magazine published by News World Communications, an international media conglomerate then owned by the Unification Church. Insight on the News ceased publication soon after the incident. Its editor, Jeff Kuhner, claimed that a person working for the Clinton campaign had told him that the campaign was "preparing an accusation that her rival Senator Barack Obama had covered up a brief period he had spent in an Islamic religious school in Indonesia when he was six". When interviewed by The New York Times, Kuhner did not name the person said to be his reporter's source. Senator Clinton denied the accusation.

Obama attended two schools during the four years he lived in Indonesia as a child (1967–1971). From the first grade until some time in the third grade he attended the Roman Catholic St. Francis Assisi School, where classes began and ended each day with Christian prayers. He was registered there as Muslim because of his stepfather, who was Indonesian. At some point during the third grade he transferred to State Elementary School Menteng 01, also known as Besuki School, for less than a year. Besuki is a secular public school. Students there wear Western clothing, and the Chicago Tribune described the school as "so progressive that teachers wore miniskirts and all students were encouraged to celebrate Christmas".

Soon after Insight's story, CNN reporter John Vause visited State Elementary School Menteng 01 and found that each student received two hours of religious instruction per week in their own faith. Hardi Priyono, the deputy headmaster of the school told Vause: "This is a public school. We don't focus on religion. In our daily lives, we try to respect religion, but we don't give preferential treatment."

Interviews by Nedra Pickler of the Associated Press found that students of all faiths have been welcome there since before Obama's attendance. Akmad Solichin, the vice-principal of the school, told Pickler: "The allegations are completely baseless. Yes, most of our students are Muslim, but there are Christians as well. Everyone's welcome here ... it's a public school."

=== Middle name "Mohammed" claim ===
One chain e-mail claimed incorrectly that President Obama's middle name is Mohammed or Muhammed. His actual middle name is Hussein inherited from his father.

=== "My Muslim faith" quote ===
During an interview with ABC's This Week with George Stephanopoulos two months before the 2008 presidential election, Obama said:

What I was suggesting — you're absolutely right that John McCain has not talked about my Muslim faith.

Fact-checking website Snopes rated the claim that "Barack Obama admitted to being a Muslim during an ABC News interview" as "false". After saying this quote, Obama clarified, "what I'm saying is ... that he [McCain] hasn't suggested that I'm a Muslim".

=== Polls and surveys ===
Public opinion surveys carried out, beginning in 2008, have shown that a number of Americans believe that Obama is a Muslim. In March 2008, a survey conducted by Pew Research Center found that 10% of respondents believed that rumor. Those who were more likely to believe he is a Muslim included political conservatives (both Republicans and Democrats), people who had not attended college, people who lived in the Midwest or the South, and people in rural areas.

A study conducted by the University of Georgia found that the percentage of Americans who believed that Obama is a Muslim remained constant at approximately 20% in September, October, and November 2008, despite frequent attempts by the media as well as the Obama campaign to correct this misconception. However, the study also showed that some people who had initially believed Obama to be a Christian later believed the rumor that he is a Muslim. The survey found that respondents who had shifted to the misconception were generally younger, less politically involved, less educated, more conservative, and more likely to believe in Biblical literalism. According to Professor Barry Hollander, "These are groups of people who are generally distrustful of the mainstream media...So therefore journalists telling them that this is not true could actually have the opposite effect and make them more likely to believe the rumor."

In August 2010, a Pew Research poll showed that 18% of Americans and 30% of Republicans believed that Obama is a Muslim.

In 2012, data from the Pew Center found that the popularity of the misinformation had increased in some groups. Specifically, over one in seven Americans (including one third of conservative Republicans) labeled the President a Muslim. Haris Tarin of the Muslim Public Affairs Council said that the survey "shows there's a lot of fear-mongering and politicking in America".

A 2016 Public Policy Polling survey indicated that 65% of Trump supporters believed that Obama was Muslim, and only 13% believed he was Christian.

== Obama's response ==
I'm a Christian by choice. My family didn't—frankly, they weren't folks who went to church every week. And my mother was one of the most spiritual people I knew, but she didn't raise me in the church. So I came to my Christian faith later in life, and it was because the precepts of Jesus Christ spoke to me in terms of the kind of life that I would want to lead—being my brothers' and sisters' keeper, treating others as they would treat me. And I think also understanding that Jesus Christ dying for my sins spoke to the humility we all have to have as human beings, that we're sinful and we're flawed and we make mistakes, and that we achieve salvation through the grace of God. But what we can do, as flawed as we are, is still see God in other people and do our best to help them find their own grace. That's what I strive to do. That's what I pray to do every day. I think my public service is part of that effort to express my Christian faith.

— Barack Obama, September 27, 2010.

=== In person ===
Obama has publicly responded to questions regarding his religion on more than one occasion. During a debate of Democratic presidential candidates on January 15, 2008, in Las Vegas, Nevada, the moderator, Brian Williams, asked Obama about the rumor that he was "trying to hide the fact that he is a Muslim". Obama responded that "the facts are: I am a Christian. I have been sworn in [to the US Senate] with a Bible." He then said "in the Internet age, there are going to be lies that are spread all over the place. I have been victimized by these lies."

On June 4, 2009, Obama delivered a speech at Cairo University titled "A New Beginning". The entire speech was recorded by C-SPAN. During his speech to the largely Muslim audience, Obama declared, "I'm a Christian."

In an interview with NBC journalist Brian Williams on August 29, 2010, Williams asked Obama about a poll that said that 20% of the American public do not believe that he is a Christian or American born. Obama gave a similar answer to the one he gave in the January 2008 debate. During the 2011 National Prayer Breakfast, the President stated, "My Christian faith then has been a sustaining force for me over these last few years, all the more so when Michelle and I hear our faith questioned from time to time".

=== Institutional ===
In addition to Obama's personal responses, the 2008 Obama presidential campaign responded to the false claims made against him by people opposed to his candidacy by launching a website called "FightTheSmears.com". One of the false claims countered by the website is that he is a Muslim and not a Christian.

In October 2010 the White House announced that it was cancelling a stop at the Golden Temple during Obama's trip to India. The decision to cancel was received with disappointment by the Sikh community, and it was speculated that the decision was in response to a photo that was circulated during the 2008 campaign of Obama wearing Kenyan traditional wardrobe during a 2006 trip to Kenya. The 2006 photo was used to raise doubts about Obama's religion.

== Claim that Obama is the Antichrist ==
During the 2008 presidential campaign, one chain e-mail accused Obama of secretly being the biblical Antichrist, saying:

According to The Book of Revelations the anti-christ is: The anti-christ will be a man, in his 40s, of MUSLIM descent, who will deceive the nations with persuasive language, and have a MASSIVE Christ-like appeal....the prophecy says that people will flock to him and he will promise false hope and world peace, and when he is in power, he will destroy everything is it OBAMA?

PolitiFact.com has analyzed the elements in this false claim and debunked each one: The word Antichrist does not appear in the Book of Revelation (though it does appear in 1 John and 2 John); the Book of Revelation instead refers to The Beast. The Book of Revelation never mentions the Beast's age, nor does it include any references to "Muslim descent", as the religion of Islam was not founded until hundreds of years after the book was written.

Margie Phelps, daughter of Westboro Baptist Church founder Fred Phelps, said in a 2011 interview with Fox News that Barack Obama would "absolutely" be going to Hell and that he was "most likely the Beast spoken of in the Revelation." She also said Obama's presidency was a sign of the Apocalypse. On January 20, 2013, Westboro Baptist Church picketers protested Obama's second inauguration. The protesters had a legal permit and used signs with homophobic messages as well as referring to Obama as the Antichrist.

== Others ==
During the 2008 United States presidential election, psychologist Alan J. Lipman wrote a fictitious parody account of a "Dr. Negative" grouping things such as drug use, adultery, Cubism, miscegenation, and pandeism as things candidate John McCain could accuse political opponent Barack Obama of. The following year, conservative blogger Mark Finkelstein in fact labeled Obama, along with Al Gore, and New York Times columnist Gail Collins as Pandeists, in a piece titled "Happy Pan-Deism Day From Gail Collins". Collins having noted the coincidence of Easter and Passover falling in the same week, wrote that "Americans with less religious inclinations can look forward to the upcoming Earth Day celebrations, when the president is planning to do something as yet unannounced, but undoubtedly special, and Arbor Day, when rumor has it that he will not just plant a tree, but personally reforest a large swath of the nation of Mali". Finkelstein retorted that:

Environmentalism has essentially become a religion, and Earth Day effectively a religious holiday. Yesterday's pan-deists, who worshiped trees and brooks, have become members of various environmental groups doing much the same thing. People like Al Gore others, and perhaps the reforesting Obama, have become their latter day shamans.

== See also ==
- Crypto-Islam
- Insight on the News
- Islamophobia
- Xenophobia
- Christian fundamentalism and conspiracy theories
