= Insight on the News =

American conservative news magazine and website (1985–2008)

- Type: News magazine
- Format: Magazine/journal; Website
- Owner: News World Communications
- Publisher: News World Communications
- Founded: 1985
- Ceased publication: 2004 (print); 2008 (online)
- Political alignment: Conservative
- Headquarters: 3600 New York Avenue NE, Washington, D.C., U.S.
- ISSN: 1051-4880
- OCLC number: 42845787

Insight on the News, also called Insight, was an American conservative print and online news magazine. It was owned by News World Communications, an international media conglomerate founded by Unification movement founder Sun Myung Moon, which at the time owned The Washington Times, United Press International, and several newspapers in Africa, Japan, and South America. Insight's reporting sometimes resulted in journalistic controversy.

== History ==
Insight was founded in 1985, three years after the founding of The Washington Times. The Washington Times assistant managing editor Kirk Oberfeld became the editor of Insight. Both publications were headquartered at 3600 New York Avenue NE, in Washington, D.C. Insight was subsidized annually with $40 million from News World, which by 2002 had shrunk to about $4 million.

In 1991, Insight was one of the first publications to use the word "Islamophobia". In 1997 Insight reported that the administration of President Bill Clinton gave political donors rights to be buried in Arlington National Cemetery. This charge was widely repeated on talk radio and other conservative outlets; but was later denied by the United States Army, which has charge over the cemetery. Media and political pressure led to the body of M. Larry Lawrence, a former United States Ambassador to Switzerland, to be exhumed at Arlington and reinterred at another location.

Conservative journalists who worked at Insight include Richard Starr, John Podhoretz and David Brock. Contributors included Arnold Beichman, Arnaud de Borchgrave, Frank Gaffney, and Lew Rockwell.

In 1998, CNN reported that Insight "created a stir" when Paula Jones, who had filed a sexual harassment lawsuit against President Clinton, was the magazine's guest at the annual White House Correspondents Association dinner where Clinton spoke.

In 1999, Insight criticized Project Megiddo, an FBI report on possible right-wing terrorism predicted for the year 2000.

In 2001, Insight printed an article by Dan Smith which said that immigration and an ethnically diverse population helped to protect the United States against terrorism. This article was reprinted as a chapter in the 2004 book Terrorism: Opposing Viewpoints.

In 2002, Insight printed a story The Washington Times reporter Steve Miller writing that African Americans were doing well economically. This story was reprinted in the 2005 book Race Relations: Opposing Viewpoints.

In 2003, Insight misquoted President Abraham Lincoln as saying during the American Civil War: "Congressmen who willfully take action during wartime that damage morale and undermine the military are saboteurs, and should be arrested, exiled or hanged." By 2008, this statement was being widely repeated, although Lincoln never said or wrote it.

In 2004, Insight printed an article by Abdulwahah Alkebsi defending the role of Islam in bringing democracy to the Middle East. The story was reprinted as a chapter in the 2004 book: Islam: Opposing Viewpoints.

In 2004, News World Communications discontinued publication of the print magazine and hired Jeffrey T. Kuhner to run Insight as a stand-alone website. Under Kuhner, Insight did not identify its reporters, in what Kuhner described as an effort to encourage contributions from sources who "do not want to reveal their names". Kuhner said about this: “Reporters in Washington know a whole lot of what is going on and feel themselves shackled and prevented from reporting what they know is going on. Insight is almost like an outlet, an escape valve where they can come out with this information.”

In 2007, Insight reported on an undercover investigation of the Dar Al-Hijrah Islamic Center, located in Falls Church, Virginia, a suburb of Washington, D.C., by the group Society of Americans for National Existence (SANE). Insight's story was denounced by the Council on American-Islamic Relations (CAIR).

In May 2008, Insight ended publication and wrote to its readers: "The kind of cutting edge behind-the-scenes political intelligence you have come to rely upon from Insight will now be available from its sister publication, The Washington Times."

== Barack Obama and Hillary Clinton 2008 presidential campaign ==
On January 17, 2007, Insight published a story which claimed that someone on the campaign staff of American presidential candidate Senator Hillary Clinton had leaked a report to one of Insight's reporters which said that Senator Barack Obama had "spent at least four years in a so-called madrassa, or Muslim seminary, in Indonesia" Kuhner, who wrote the story, claimed that the source said that the Clinton campaign was "preparing an accusation that her rival Senator Barack Obama had covered up a brief period he had spent in an Islamic religious school in Indonesia when he was six." Insight story was reported on first by conservative talk radio and Fox News, and then by The New York Times and other media. When interviewed by The New York Times, Kuhner refused to name the person said to be the reporter's source. Clinton denied the accusation.

CNN reporter John Vause visited State Elementary School Menteng 01, a secular public school which Obama had attended for one year after attending a Roman Catholic school for three, and found that each student received two hours of religious instruction per week in his or her own faith. He was told by Hardi Priyono, deputy headmaster of the school, "This is a public school. We don't focus on religion. In our daily lives, we try to respect religion, but we don't give preferential treatment." Students at Besuki wore Western clothing, and the Chicago Tribune described the school as "so progressive that teachers wore miniskirts and all students were encouraged to celebrate Christmas".

Interviews by Nedra Pickler of the Associated Press found that students of all faiths have been welcome there since before Obama's attendance. Akmad Solichin, the vice principal of the school, told Pickler: “The allegations are completely baseless. Yes, most of our students are Muslim, but there are Christians as well. Everyone's welcome here ... it's a public school.”

== See also ==
- Barack Obama religion conspiracy theories
- News World Communications
- The Washington Times
- Unification Church political activities
- Unification Church of the United States
