= Dennis Lynch =

Dennis Lynch may refer to:

- Dennis Lynch, mayor of Pawtucket, Rhode Island, defendant in Lynch v. Donnelly
- Dennis Michael Lynch, American businessman, documentary filmmaker, podcast host and news personality

== See also ==
- Denis Lynch, Irish show jumper
