= Steven B. Dodge =

Media entrepreneur (1945–2019)

- Born: Steven Bruce Dodge; July 12, 1945; New Haven, Connecticut
- Died: January 19, 2019 (aged 73); Bonita Springs, Florida
- Education: Yale University
- Spouse: Anne Nordblom Dodge

Steven Bruce Dodge (July 12, 1945 – January 17, 2019) was an American telecommunications and media entrepreneur, environmentalist, and philanthropist. He co-founded and was the founder, chairman and CEO of five companies including American Tower, American Radio Systems, American Cablesystems, Windover Development, and Beverly Crossing. Dodge was inducted into the Academy of Distinguished Entrepreneurs at Babson College in 2002 and the Mobile Infrastructure Hall of Fame in November 2018. Throughout his career he served on numerous boards, including Sotheby’s, The Cabot (Beverly, Massachusetts), the Dana Farber Cancer Institute, Endicott College, and Montserrat College of Art.

Dodge died in Bonita Springs, Florida, after being struck by a vehicle while crossing a road with his bicycle. At the time of his death, Deborah Parenti, publisher of the trade journal Radio Ink, described Dodge as extraordinary and noted his ability to make others proud of their work. The Boston Globe described him as a serial entrepreneur who became one of Greater Boston’s most successful businessmen.

== Early life ==
Dodge was born in New Haven, Connecticut, to Nelson Dodge, a sales executive, and Betsy (Adams) Dodge, an artist. The senior Mr. Dodge died when Steve was 9. His mother married Donald Bradley (The Hotchkiss School, 1925), a banker, and the family moved to Cheshire, Connecticut. Dodge graduated from Hotchkiss (1963) and from Yale University (1967) with a degree in English. He attended Navy Officer Candidate School in Newport, Rhode Island, and served in the Navy for four years, most of his time aboard a destroyer, rising in rank to lieutenant and chief engineer. In a 2018 interview, Dodge credited his time in the Navy for helping him learn to work hard and focus on tangible results.

== Career ==
=== Bank of Boston ===
Back in civilian life, Dodge joined the Bank of Boston in the commercial loan officer training program. Selected from the program by bank executive William L. Brown, Dodge was asked to research and later lend to a new industry, cable-TV. He liked it right away. He became the senior lender for the bank on the Continental Cablevision account, among others. He enjoyed commercial lending but want to work for himself. His exposure to players in the cable TV industry helped him realize that he could do it. Dodge decided to leave the bank to launch his own cable company.

=== American Cablesystems Corporation ===
In 1978 Dodge founded American Cablesystems Corporation (ACS), initially headquartered in Boston, Massachusetts, moving to Beverly, Massachusetts, in 1983. ACS built and operated cable franchises in Massachusetts, New York, Florida, California, Illinois, West Virginia, Virginia, and Tennessee. Dodge was Chairman and CEO from the company’s founding until its sale in 1988. He found it challenging to deal with the day-to-day minutiae of running a business. The company’s initial public offering was in May 1986 and priced at $14.50 share price (AMEX:ACN). In October 1987, ACS signed a definitive merger agreement with Continental Cablevision for a per subscriber price of $2,100 and a per share price of $46.50. The transaction, valued at $723 million ($473 million equity plus the assumption of debt), closed in February 1988.

=== American Radio Systems Corporation ===
In February 1988, Dodge founded Atlantic Ventures (later Atlantic Radio L.P.) with a small team from American Cablesystems, led by executives Eric Schultz, Joseph Winn, and Michael Milsom. Atlantic purchased radio stations in Boston, Rochester, and Syracuse, New York, and Burlington, Vermont. By 1993 Atlantic had sold all of its stations except Boston, where the company owned Mix 98.5, Eagle 93.7, WEEI, and WRKO. On November 1, 1993, Atlantic merged with Multi Market Communications, Inc. and Stoner Broadcasting System Holding, Inc., forming American Radio Systems Corporation (American Radio) with Dodge as Chairman, President and CEO, Winn as CFO and Director, and David Pearlman and John Gehron, and later Don Bouloukis, as co-chief operating officers until its merger with CBS Corporation in 1998. In June 1995, American Radio completed an initial public offering at $16.50 per share, with proceeds of $70.4 million. By the end of 1995 the Company owned 24 radio stations in eight markets. In April 1997, the Company merged with EZ Communications, adding 24 radio stations in eight markets, for an aggregate purchase price (including assumed debt) of $830 million. By the end of 1997, the Company owned 100 radio stations in 21 markets, and had also acquired 760 wireless communications sites. ARS became the country’s fourth-largest radio group. Dodge was on Radio Ink‘s “40 Most Powerful People in Radio” list in 1996 (at #7) and 1997 (#6).

In June 1998, American Radio became a wholly owned subsidiary of CBS Corporation pursuant to a merger agreement. American Radio shareholders received $44.00 per share plus one share of American Tower (NYSE:AMT) common stock in a transaction valued at a then-record enterprise price of over $2.6 billion.

=== American Tower Corporation ===
While operating American Radio in 1995, Dodge recognized the opportunity in the wireless-communications site industry. ARS owned towers and wireless companies began approaching it for space. Dodge felt it was obvious that wireless was coming, so the firm started building new towers to see what kind of business they might attract. In July 1995, American Radio organized American Tower Systems Inc. as a wholly owned subsidiary. Dodge noted that he knew they were onto something when the early towers filled quickly and became profitable. On June 4, 1998, American Tower Corporation became a standalone public company (NYSE:AMT). Dodge was Chairman, President, and CEO of American Tower Corporation from its founding until 2004. In 1998, American Tower Systems Inc. merged with its competitor, American Tower Corporation, and acquired Gearon & Co., Inc. At the end of 1998 American Tower operated 3,200 towers in 44 states. Dodge retired as Chairman at the 2004 Annual Meeting of shareholders. At the time, the Company operated approximately 15,000 communications sites in the United States, Mexico, and Brazil.

=== Windover Development, LLC ===
In 2005, Dodge founded Windover, a custom builder of luxury homes on Boston’s North Shore, later expanding to Bonita Beach, Florida, and adding Windover Construction, a full-service construction management firm focused on residential, commercial and institutional projects. In 2017, Windover Construction was purchased by its employees, led by CEO Lee Dellicker.

=== Beverly Crossing LLC ===
In 2016, Dodge founded Beverly Crossing, a real estate development group that creates, owns, and operates residential communities in Massachusetts, and in Florida, where it serves the Gulf Coast from Naples to Ft. Myers as Windover Development of Florida. Dodge described Beverly as the focus replacing the City’s industrial core with apartments and restaurants built around Beverly Depot.

== Personal life ==
In 1974, Dodge married Anne Nordblom, whom he had met at the Bank of Boston. The couple had three children, Thomas, Kristen, and Benjamin. Dodge and his wife were benefactors of Brookwood School, Brown University, Middlesex School, Milton Academy, the Boston Renaissance Charter Public School, and the University of Vermont. Dodge’s obituary noted his humility, generosity, and sense of humor as well as his ability to mentor and instill confidence in others.

Dodge’s launch of Windover in 2005 was a result of his personal interest in architecture and construction and an opportunity to create special places. He artfully enhanced landscapes in Massachusetts and Vermont featuring weathered fieldstone fences, newly planted trees, and classic New England structures.

Dodge was a Red Sox fan and a reader. His favorite getaways included fishing the mountain streams in Chile and motorcycling in Sardinia, enjoying the latter particularly because they had no speed limits.
