= The First TV =

American conservative network

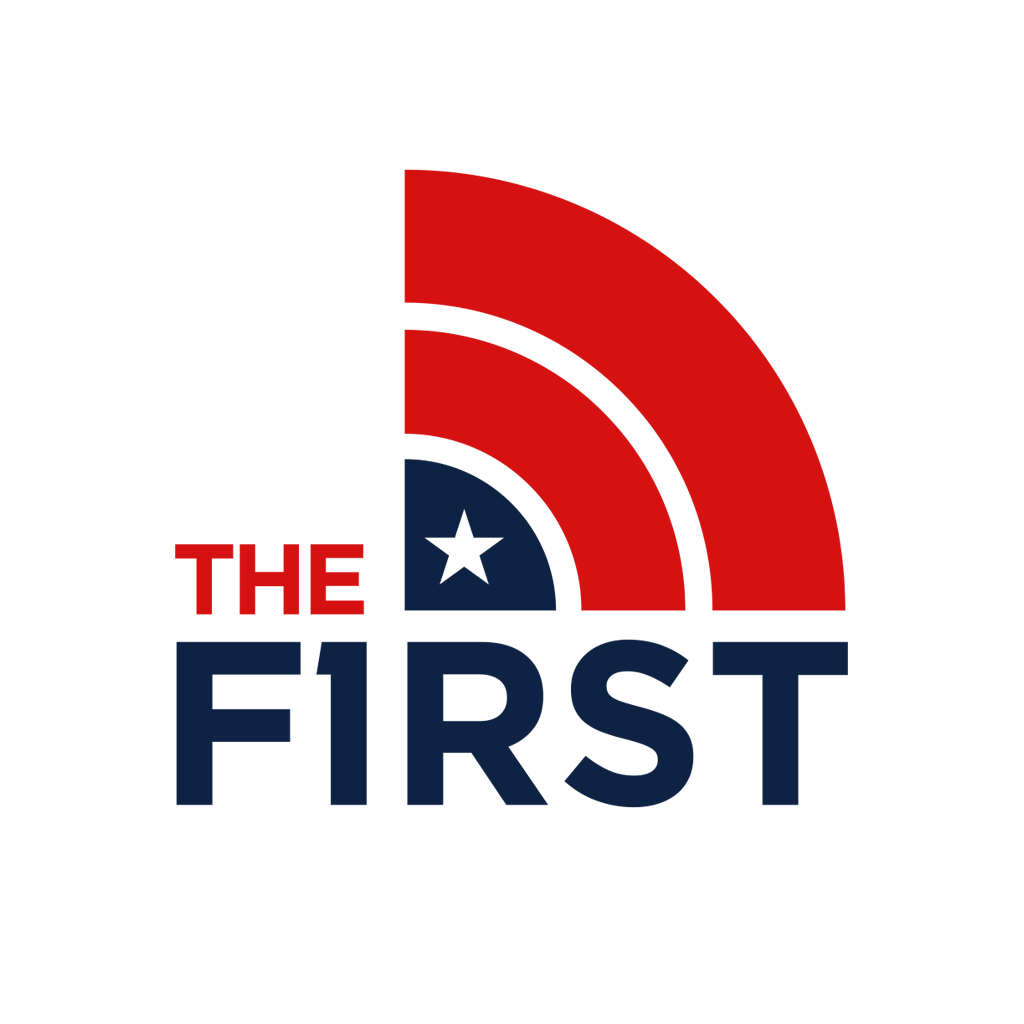
- Type: Conservative opinion and commentary network
- Country: United States

Programming
- Language: English

Ownership
- Owner: The First Digital, Inc.

History
- Launched: October 2019

Links
- Website: www.thefirsttv.com

The First, also called The First TV and stylized as The F1rst, is a conservative opinion and commentary network in the United States that started in October 2019. It has five hosts, including Bill O'Reilly.

== History ==
The First was launched in October 2019 on Pluto TV, a streaming platform owned by Paramount Global. It was started in partnership with Red Seat Ventures. It offers about 45 hours of original programming a week. In January 2023, The First was added to DirecTV, after it concurrently dropped Newsmax TV due to demands for carriage fees.

== Hosts ==
The First launched with two hosts in October 2019, combat veteran Jesse Kelly and former CIA analyst Buck Sexton. In January 2020, the network added California-based talk radio host Mike Slater and Dana Loesch. On June 1, 2020, the network announced that Bill O'Reilly was joining the network with his show No Spin News. He began the online show in 2017 after being fired from Fox News Channel, in the wake of The New York Times publishing details of six sexual misconduct lawsuits O'Reilly had settled. Former OANN host, CPAC speaker, and conservative podcaster Liz Wheeler was added to the network in January 2023. Josh Hammer hosts America on Trial with Josh Hammer, a legal podcast primarily focused on the 2024 United States presidential election. Mike Baker hosts a podcast called The President's Daily Brief.

== Reception ==
Tyler Hersko of IndieWire criticized ViacomCBS for their involvement in O'Reilly's show, commenting that its Pluto TV debut coincided with the date that its entertainment and youth channels were made unavailable for eight minutes 46 seconds in solidarity with Black Lives Matter. Hersko found this hypocritical in light of comments made by O'Reilly about African-Americans. A petition by ViacomCBS employees urged the company to remove The First for similar reasons.
