= WRKO =

Talk radio station in Boston, Massachusetts

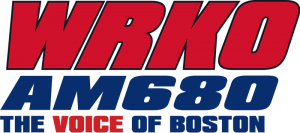
- Boston, Massachusetts; United States
- Broadcast area: New England
- Frequency: 680 kHz
- Branding: WRKO AM 680

Programming
- Format: News/talk
- Affiliations: 24/7 News; Fox News Radio; Compass Media Networks; Premiere Networks; Total Traffic and Weather Network

Ownership
- Owner: iHeartMedia; (iHM Licenses, LLC)
- Sister stations: WBWL; WBZ; WJMN; WXKS; WXKS-FM; WZLX; WZRM

History
- First air date: December 19, 1937
- Former call signs: WLAW (1937–1953); WNAC (1953–1967)
- Call sign meaning: former owner RKO General

Technical information
- Licensing authority: FCC
- Facility ID: 1902
- Class: B
- Power: 50,000 watts
- Transmitter coordinates: 42.490373°N 71.217556°W
- Repeater: 100.7 WZLX-HD2 (Boston)

Links
- Public license information: Public file; LMS
- Webcast: Listen live (via iHeartRadio)
- Website: wrko.iheart.com

WRKO (680 AM) is a commercial news/talk radio station licensed to Boston, Massachusetts, serving Greater Boston and much of surrounding New England. Owned by iHeartMedia, WRKO is a Class B AM station that provides secondary coverage to portions of Massachusetts, Connecticut, Rhode Island, New Hampshire and Maine during the day, but is highly directional at night to protect a number of clear-channel stations on adjacent frequencies. WRKO serves as the Boston affiliate for 24/7 News, Coast to Coast AM and This Morning, America's First News with Gordon Deal; syndicated personalities Joe Pags, John Batchelor and Bill Cunningham; the flagship station of The Howie Carr Show, and the home of radio personality Jeff Kuhner. The WRKO studios are located in the Boston suburb of Medford, while the station transmitter resides in nearby Burlington. Besides its main analog transmission, WRKO simulcasts over the HD2 subchannel of sister station WZLX, and streams online via iHeartRadio.

WRKO is one of three AM stations owned by iHeartMedia in the Boston market that features a spoken word format; WBZ is all news during the day and overnight, with local talk in the evening, while WXKS carries a nationally syndicated conservative talk line up.

The 680 kHz facility went on the air from Lawrence in 1937 as WLAW, the radio station of the Lawrence Daily Eagle and Evening Tribune. The station moved its transmitter from Andover to Burlington in 1947, and began turning its focus to Boston. WLAW was acquired by General Teleradio in 1953 to serve as an upgraded facility for WNAC, replacing 1260 AM; it formally moved from Lawrence to Boston in 1957. The station became WRKO in 1967, in connection to a format change to top 40; after an evolution to adult contemporary music, it would move to a talk format in 1981. Following regulatory issues involving parent company Gencorp, in 1988 RKO General sold WRKO to Steve Dodge's Atlantic Ventures, which became American Radio Systems (ARS) in 1993. After ARS was purchased by the parent company of CBS Radio in 1998, WRKO was spun off to Entercom; when Entercom acquired CBS Radio in 2017, the station was sold to iHeartMedia.

== History ==
=== WLAW (1937–1953) ===
The station first went on the air as WLAW on December 19, 1937, at 680 on the AM dial. The station was licensed to Lawrence, Massachusetts, some 25 miles (40 km) north of Boston; its transmitter was in nearby Andover. It was owned and operated by Hildreth and Rogers, publishers of the Lawrence Daily Eagle and Evening Tribune. Initially a 1,000-watt daytime-only station, WLAW would boost its power to 5,000 watts in 1940; the Federal Communications Commission (FCC) also granted the station authority to operate at night, using a directional antenna to protect the signals of KPO in San Francisco, which had been the dominant station on the clear channel of 680 kHz, and WPTF in Raleigh, North Carolina, which had also been granted nighttime service on the channel.

In 1945, WLAW applied to boost its power to 50,000 watts, and relocate its transmitter to Burlington; the station would make this upgrade in 1947. In conjunction with the move, WLAW opened a Boston studio on Tremont Street in the Theater District; it also maintained a third studio in Lowell. The owners also acquired an FM station: WLAW-FM 93.7 was officially dedicated on November 10, 1947. In mid-1951, WLAW and WLAW-FM moved to new studios at the Hotel Bradford in Boston.

=== WNAC (1953–1967) ===
In May 1953, General Teleradio, General Tire's broadcasting division and owner of WNAC (1260 AM), bought WLAW and WLAW-FM from Hildreth and Rogers for $475,000; and concurrently sold WNAC to Vic Diehm and Associates for $125,000. WLAW's availability was seen as a way to "upgrade" the signal for WNAC; in 1947, the FCC denied a request to allow WNAC (1260 AM) to move to 1200 kHz and boost its power, using a directional 50,000-watt transmitter. On June 17, 1953, General Teleradio changed WLAW's call letters to WNAC, moved the old 1260 AM format to 680 AM, and reassigned on- and off-air personnel. In effect, this new WNAC (680 AM) licensed to Lawrence became the successor to WNAC (1260 AM) licensed to Boston. For this reason, this transaction is seen as WNAC "moving" from 1260 AM to 680 AM.

Vic Diehm and Associates subsequently changed 1260 AM's calls to WVDA and launched a new format on that station using WLAW's former studios. WLAW-FM had its license surrendered, as WNAC-FM 98.5 was retained by General Teleradio; a separate station on 93.7 FM also licensed to Lawrence signed on in 1960 as WGHJ; now known as WEEI-FM. While the new WNAC was, for all intents and purposes, a Boston station, its city of license remained in Lawrence until July 25, 1957; at least until 1962, the legal station identification was "WNAC Boston-Lawrence".

For a brief time in 1956 and 1957, WNAC was affiliated with both the Mutual Broadcasting System and the NBC Radio Network after WBZ dropped NBC programming. WNAC remained a Mutual affiliate until the network, of which General Tire (by then doing business as RKO Teleradio Pictures) was a part-owner, was sold in July 1957. WNAC also lost the NBC Radio affiliation to WEZE (1260 AM) (the former WVDA) in 1957. By December 1959, RKO Teleradio adopted the RKO General banner.

WNAC-FM changed call letters to WRKO-FM on May 10, 1957, but retained its simulcast of WNAC's programming until 1963, when separate programming was inaugurated for half of the broadcast day.

WNAC, along with WRKO-FM and WNAC-TV (channel 7), were nearly sold by RKO General to NBC as part of a multi-city transaction and station trade between the two companies announced in March 1960. This arrangement wound up under review at both the FCC and the U.S. Department of Justice due to issues involving NBC's previous exchange of assets with Westinghouse Broadcasting in Cleveland and Philadelphia. Ultimately, the RKO-NBC transaction never materialized.

=== Top 40 era ===
On October 12, 1966, WRKO-FM dropped its simulcast of WNAC outside of overnights and morning drive, and introduced an automated top 40 format. Owing to WRKO-FM's relative success with that format, RKO General changed WNAC's call sign to WRKO on March 3, 1967, and the format also switched to Top 40; both stations would still simulcast each other for 11 hours a day. With this move, the Yankee Network, of which WNAC and predecessor WNAC (1260 AM) had been the flagship station of since 1929, ceased operations.

The move to a Top 40 format in March 1967 was an enormous success. For the next decade, WRKO was one of Boston's top-rated radio stations, and absolutely dominant among its target audience of listeners in the 18-34 demographic. Known to its listeners as "The Big 68", WRKO was home to such well-known personalities as longtime morning man Dale Dorman, Chuck Knapp, Joel Cash, Johnny Dark, J. J. Wright, J. J. Jeffrey, Harry Nelson (afternoon drive and later PD of WRKO in 1978), Shadoe Stevens, Frank Kingston Smith (who was known as "Bobby Mitchell"), Steve Anthony and many others. Mel Phillips, who replaced Bob Henabery as program director, served in that position from 1967 to 1972 before being replaced by Scotty Brink.

WRKO in 1967 even took a dig at market leader WBZ, a Westinghouse Broadcasting station that played popular music. In advance of WRKO's format change to Top 40, WBZ tried to get in front of WRKO by adopting the slogan "Boss Radio" (used on famous RKO General top 40 station KHJ in Los Angeles). WRKO, in response, was rumored to have had their DJs reading a liner that said "WRKO, putting the Boss in the Restinghouse." WRKO did ultimately drive WBZ out of the top 40 format.

WRKO's other main competitor was WMEX, which was Boston's original Top 40 station, starting the format in 1957. Even though WMEX's city ratings were good, it had a highly directional signal and did not effectively reach many of the suburbs, especially at night. WRKO (and the growing popularity of FM rock stations) eventually drove WMEX to a format change in 1975, with WRKO remaining Boston's sole AM Top 40 station. In May 1975, WRKO's airborne traffic reporter, "The Red Baron" (Rick Blumberg), joined the morning team with Dale Dorman and Bill Rossi. The Red Baron was both the pilot and traffic reporter, flying at 1000 feet over Boston, in a fixed wing aircraft. 1975 and 1976 were the only years that WRKO had an aircraft in the sky.

WRKO was propelled in its success by the introduction of the so-called Drake format originated by radio programmer Bill Drake. In contrast to other Top 40 formats at the time, it featured a limited playlist of only the top hits, with strict minimal talk and a more music approach presented in a straightforward manner. This format was adopted by other stations across the country, including RKO General stations KHJ in Los Angeles, WHBQ in Memphis and WOR-FM in New York. Virtually any station using the Drake sound rose to the top of its market.

By the end of the 1970s, however, rock and Top 40 radio had begun to migrate from AM to FM. In a three-year period from 1978 to 1981, WRKO lost a chunk of its audience. The station tried to compete with the surge in FM listening, first with a short-lived focus on album cuts and later by switching to more of an adult contemporary music format, featuring a morning program with market legend Norm Nathan. A switch to a country music format was also reportedly briefly considered. In 1980, WRKO began running talk programming during evening hours. On September 27, 1981, the station switched to an all-talk format; at 6:00 p.m. on that date, Justin Clark played the last song, "American Pie" by Don McLean.

=== Talk era ===
former logo

After switching to the talk radio format, Norm Nathan was retained as morning host; the initial lineup also included Dick Syatt in late mornings, Dr. Harry Sobel in middays, Jerry Williams in afternoon drive, and Guy Mainella and David Brudnoy in evenings. As it moved to more issue-oriented talk, some of the most prominent talk radio hosts in the country broadcast on WRKO, such as Gene Burns, the aforementioned Williams, Ted O'Brien, and Paul Parent.

But throughout the 1980s, WRKO's parent company, General Tire and Rubber, later renamed Gencorp, was under multiple federal investigations and ultimately under an FCC investigation due to its "lack of candor" for failing to disclose unlawful operations by General Tire. In the midst of the investigation into its parent company's problems, RKO General found itself under investigation for reciprocal trade practices involving several of its properties, and later for double billing by a radio network it organized, the RKO Radio Network. The FCC license hearings culminated in the loss of the company's license to operate WNAC-TV; RKO General sold the station assets to New England Television Corporation, who was awarded a license for a replacement station. WNAC-TV signed off permanently on May 21, 1982, with WNEV-TV (now WHDH-TV) taking its place the next morning.

After a long and protracted battle, FCC administrative law judge Edward Kuhlmann ruled on August 11, 1987, that all of RKO General's broadcast licenses, including WRKO's license, be denied renewal; this excluded WOR-TV, which had its city of license changed from New York to Secaucus, New Jersey, in an attempt to avoid the loss of its license, then was divested to MCA Inc. nine months prior to the ruling. Gencorp initially appealed the ruling, but was advised by the FCC that any appeal would be denied, and that their stations should be divested instead so as to avoid the indignity of additional license stripping without compensation. As part of the settlements worked out in Boston, New York, Memphis, Chicago, Fort Lauderdale, Los Angeles and San Francisco, WRKO and its FM sister station, WROR (the former WNAC-FM and WRKO-FM; now WBZ-FM), were sold to Atlantic Ventures Corp., operated by cable television executive Steve Dodge, for $28 million in November 1988; Gencorp only received $17.5 million, with the rest being awarded to past applicants that had competed for the licenses.

On December 1, 1992, Atlantic Ventures acquired WHDH (850 AM) from New England Television Corporation, which had put the station up for sale to help pay down debt; the sale put the two talk stations under the same ownership. Atlantic Ventures merged with two other radio groups, Stoner Broadcasting Systems and Multi Market Communications, on June 5, 1993, to form American Radio Systems; the combined company would then purchase the intellectual property of WEEI (590 AM) from Back Bay Broadcasters on August 15, 1994. As part of the deal, WHDH would change its call letters to WEEI, and change format to sports radio; The Rush Limbaugh Show, Howie Carr and the "Skyway Patrol" traffic report branding were all moved from WHDH to WRKO in the transaction, which was consummated on August 29.

Westinghouse Electric Corporation, then-parent company of CBS Radio, announced its acquisition of American Radio Systems in September 1997; the merger was completed in 1998. As the combined company would have controlled 59 percent of advertising revenues in the Boston market, as well as three of the top five radio stations, in April 1998 the Department of Justice ordered CBS to divest WRKO, WEEI, WAAF (now WKVB), and WEGQ (now WEEI-FM), as well as KSD and KLOU in St. Louis and WOCT in Baltimore, as a condition of its approval of the merger. In August 1998, Entercom announced plans to acquire the four Boston-area stations, along with WWTM (now WVEI), from CBS for $140 million.

WRKO was, from 1986 to 1994, the flagship station for the Boston Red Sox. In 2006, Entercom inked a 10-year deal to make WRKO the co-flagship station for the Red Sox Radio Network along with WEEI; WEEI once again became the sole flagship station on August 26, 2009. WRKO also carried Boston Celtics basketball broadcasts from 2005 to 2007, when WEEI assumed the flagship station role.

Howie Carr took over for Jerry Williams in the afternoon drive time slot in 1994; Williams would move first to late mornings, then to weekend afternoons in January 1997, before leaving WRKO altogether in October 1998. The Howie Carr Show eventually was picked up by other talk stations around New England and briefly syndicated by ABC Radio Networks before syndication was taken over by Entercom, and ultimately, by Carr himself. After a lengthy labor dispute between Carr and Entercom in 2007, WRKO dropped the program in November 2014, with Carr signing WMEX as a replacement affiliate for the Boston market. WRKO and Howie Carr reached an agreement to carry the show again on March 16, 2015, but with the station as an affiliate instead of acting as his employer.

On November 16, 2006, all on-air news anchors and traffic reporters were fired. WGBH-TV's Beat the Press reported that the news and traffic reporters were informed individually and received severance pay. WRKO contracted with Metro Networks (now the Total Traffic and Weather Network) to provide hourly news updates, including traffic and weather, during the day. In announcing the decision, WRKO said that the station's local news and issues would be driven by the talk show hosts, instead of the news anchors.

The station itself made news in early November 2006, when late morning host John DePetro was fired following his on-air description of gubernatorial candidate Grace Ross as a "fat lesbian". Former Massachusetts House Speaker Tom Finneran was then hired as WRKO's morning-drive host in January 2007, replacing Scott Allen Miller; WRKO host Todd Feinburg was added as a co-host in January 2009. Finneran was dropped from the lineup at the end of May 2012; his replacement, Michele McPhee, was paired with Fineburg until October 31, when Jeff Kuhner was moved into the time slot.

Massachusetts state trooper Grant Moulison was WRKO's lead traffic reporter from 1985 until retiring from the force in April 2006, with 32 years of service behind him.

WRKO has notably dropped The Rush Limbaugh Show from its schedule two different times: the first time came in March 2010 when Clear Channel Communications (now iHeartMedia, current owners of WRKO) launched a talk station of its own on WXKS (1200 AM), and picked up the affiliation rights to it and other programs syndicated by Premiere Networks; this also included Coast to Coast AM, which WRKO aired in overnights. After WXKS changed formats from talk radio to all-comedy in August 2012, both Rush Limbaugh and Coast to Coast AM returned to WRKO's lineup. WRKO dropped Rush Limbaugh again in May 2015, citing the expenses for running Limbaugh had risen too steeply; Kuhner was moved to the midday time slot; the replacement morning show, co-hosted by Kim Carrigan and Doug "VB" Goudie, featured material from Boston.com as part of a content partnership with The Boston Globe.

=== iHeart era ===
On February 2, 2017, CBS Radio announced it would merge with Entercom; that October 10, CBS and Entercom placed WRKO, along with WKAF, WBZ, WBZ-FM, and WZLX, up for divestiture as part of the process of obtaining regulatory approval of the merger. iHeartMedia acquired WRKO, WBZ, WZLX and WKAF as part of a multi-market station and asset swap between it and Entercom; to meet ownership limits set by the FCC, WKOX was designated to be divested. The merger was approved on November 9, 2017, and consummated on November 17. Until WKOX's spinoff into the Ocean Stations Trust was completed, WRKO was operated by the Entercom Divestiture Trust, while the sister stations began being operated by iHeart once the merger closed. iHeart began operating WRKO on December 19, 2017; on that date, it completed its acquisition of WRKO, WZLX, WKAF, and WBZ. With the ownership change, WRKO added a simulcast on the HD-2 signal of WZLX.

WRKO's studios moved to iHeartMedia's facilities in Medford in July 2018; the main talk studio is shared with WBZ.

In late November 2018, WRKO moved Jeff Kuhner back to morning drive and Doug Goudie to middays, with Kim Carrigan exiting the station. Two years later, iHeart laid off Goudie, and announced a new show to be hosted by Grace Curley and produced by the Howie Carr Radio Network, which was launched on January 4, 2021.

== Programming ==
WRKO has local conservative talk shows on its weekday schedule, including Jeff Kuhner, who hosts the morning drive time program, and The Howie Carr Show, hosted by Howie Carr, airs in late afternoons; Carr's show is regionally syndicated to a number of other talk stations in New England, and an hour of Carr's show is simulcast on the cable network Newsmax TV. Conservative talk shows hosted by Jesse Kelly (syndicated via Premiere Networks); and Joe Pags (syndicated via Compass Media Networks) air during the evening hours. Paranormal/conspiracy theory oriented program Coast to Coast AM with George Noory airs through the overnight hours, via Premiere Networks. This Morning, America's First News with Gordon Deal, also syndicated via Compass Media Networks, airs in the early morning hours.

WRKO airs several weekend talk programs, including: Gun Talk, The Money Pit Home Improvement Radio Show and The Lutheran Hour; syndicated shows hosted by Gil Gross and Bill Cunningham; and assorted brokered programming.
