= Hitman: The Untold Story of Johnny Martorano =

Hitman: The Untold Story of Johnny Martorano: Whitey Bulger's Enforcer and the Most Feared Gangster in the Underworld
- First edition
- Author: Howie Carr
- Publisher: Forge Books
- Publication date: 2011
- ISBN: 978-0765326393

Hitman: The Untold Story of Johnny Martorano is a book about Johnny Martorano, a former hitman for the Winter Hill Gang in Boston, Massachusetts who murdered 20 people for the gang. The book is co-authored by Boston Herald reporter Howie Carr and Martorano
