= John Vause =

Australian journalist

John Vause (born 22 August 1968) is an Australian journalist and Atlanta-based presenter who recently worked for CNN International until August 2025. Before that, he was a Beijing correspondent responsible for coverage of China and the region. Before CNN, he was the Los Angeles bureau chief for the Seven Network in Australia. He is one of a few reporters who covered 9/11 from New York, then travelled to Pakistan, and then to Afghanistan for the fall of the Taliban.

Vause has covered some of the biggest international stories in the 2000s; when he was based in Beijing, he reported around the region, including stories such as the assassination of Benazir Bhutto in Pakistan. Before Beijing, he was the network's senior reporter in Jerusalem – he was part of the team which won an Edward R Murrow award for CNN's coverage of the Israel-Hezbollah war in the summer of 2006. Before that he covered the rise of Hamas, the death of Yasser Arafat, the Israeli withdrawal from Gaza and the siege at the Church of the Nativity in Bethlehem. He was also present for the sustained suicide bombing campaign by Palestinian militants during 2002. Vause's interview with a suicide bomber in 2004 won him a New York Festival award.

In 2003, he presented CNN International's coverage of the Iraq War from Kuwait, before crossing into Iraq as a reporter, moving from Basra in the south all the way to Baghdad, staying in the country for three months, then driving to Jerusalem to cover the Aqaba Summit, which outlined the US vision for a Palestinian State and Road Map to peace. In 2007, he visited State Elementary School Menteng 01 in Indonesia which the then-presidential candidate Barack Obama had attended for one year and found that each student received two hours of religious instruction per week in their own faith, contrary to some false rumours that were then circulating by Insight on the News.

In November 2015 he came under criticism for an interview of Yasser Louati, spokesperson for an anti-Islamophobia group, Collective Against Islamophobia in France, in which he suggested that the Muslim community should take responsibility for terrorist attacks committed by Muslims.

He graduated with a Bachelor of Arts from the University of Queensland in 1988.

He is married to actress Tushka Bergen and the couple have one child, Katie Vause.
