= Mel Phillips (radio programmer) =

American radio programmer (born 1940)

Radio Programmer Mel Phillips

Melvyn Phillips (born March 15, 1940, in Brooklyn, New York) is an American writer who writes the post MelPhillipsradioviews.com. He is a regular contributor to "Vox Jox". In the 1970s, he programmed radio stations WOR-FM, WXLO and WNBC, New York, WRKO AM&FM, Boston and KQV, Pittsburgh. He was general manager of Hooper Radio and had worked in various disc jockey positions in Tampa, Nashville, Norfolk and Atlantic City in the 1960s.

He worked for such syndicated radio companies as ABC, MJI and United Stations Radio Networks. While working at WCBS-FM, New York in the 1990s and through 2004, he wrote and produced music specials. His music business work in national and international promotion at CBS Records, helped to introduce The Clash, Gloria Estefan, Loverboy, Judas Priest, George Michael and Julio Iglesias to America.

Phillips began writing and posting websites in 2005. In 2011, Phillips started a new post called Mel Phillips Radio Views. In recent years, he has written the document "WRKO...The Launch" and published six books through Amazon titled Mel Phillips Radio Views - The Book, From the Mailroom to the Majors, Timeline Memories, The Birthday Hall of Fame, Radio Views & Trends and A Lifetime of Music Memories.
