= Howie Carr =

American journalist and political commentator (born 1952)

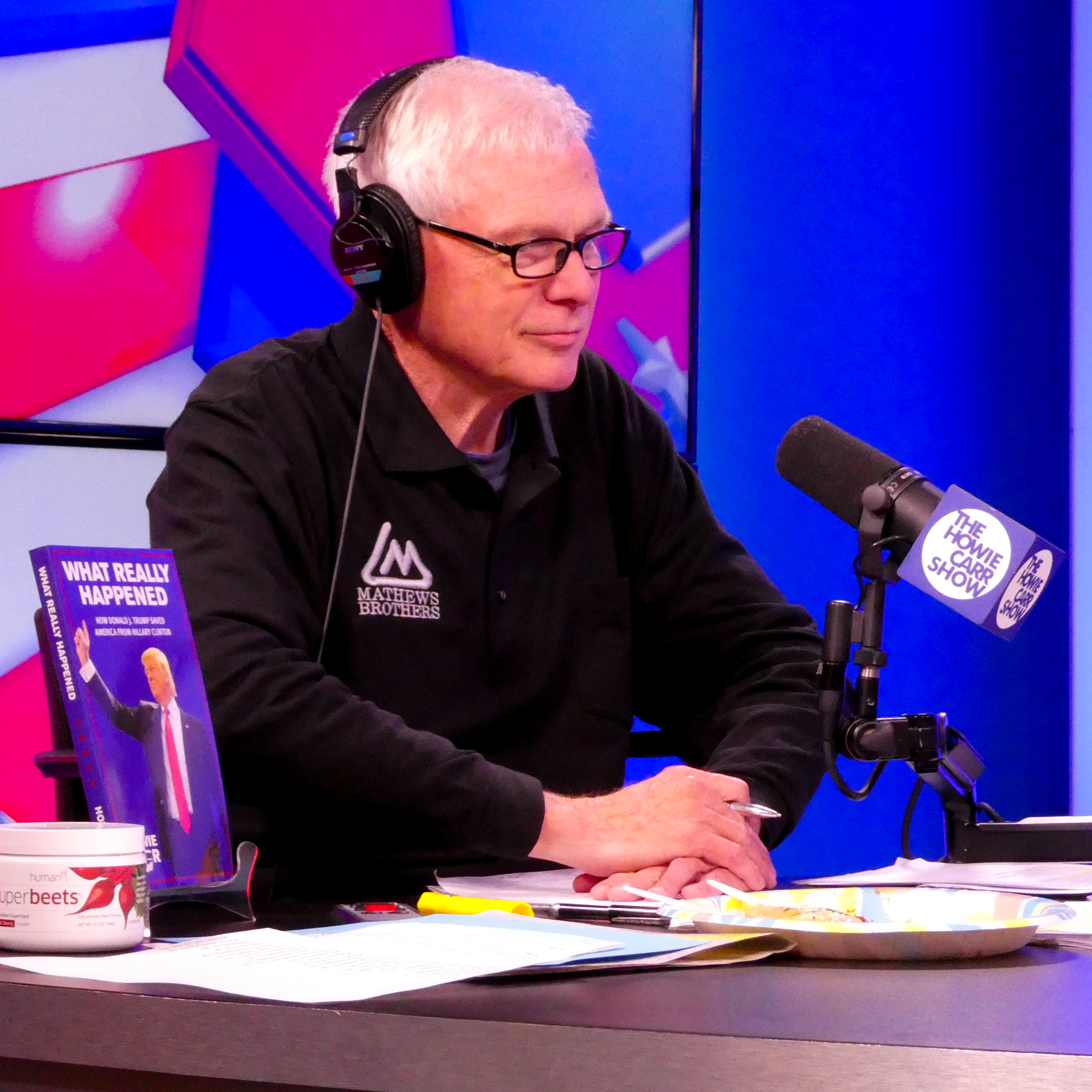
- Carr in 2020
- Born: Howard Louis Carr Jr. January 17, 1952 (age 74); Portland, Maine, U.S.
- Education: University of North Carolina at Chapel Hill
- Spouse(s): married; wife's name Kathy; children: (first marriage) two daughters; (second marriage) Carolyn, Charlotte, Christina
- Children: 5
- Presenting career
- Style: Current events
- Country: United States
- Website: howiecarrshow.com

Howard Louis Carr Jr. (born January 17, 1952) is an American conservative radio talk-show host, political author, news reporter and award-winning writer.

He hosts The Howie Carr Show originating from his studios in Wellesley, Massachusetts, and broadcast on weekdays on WRKO in Boston as well as to an audience based in New England, in addition to writing three columns a week for the Boston Herald.

== Early life ==
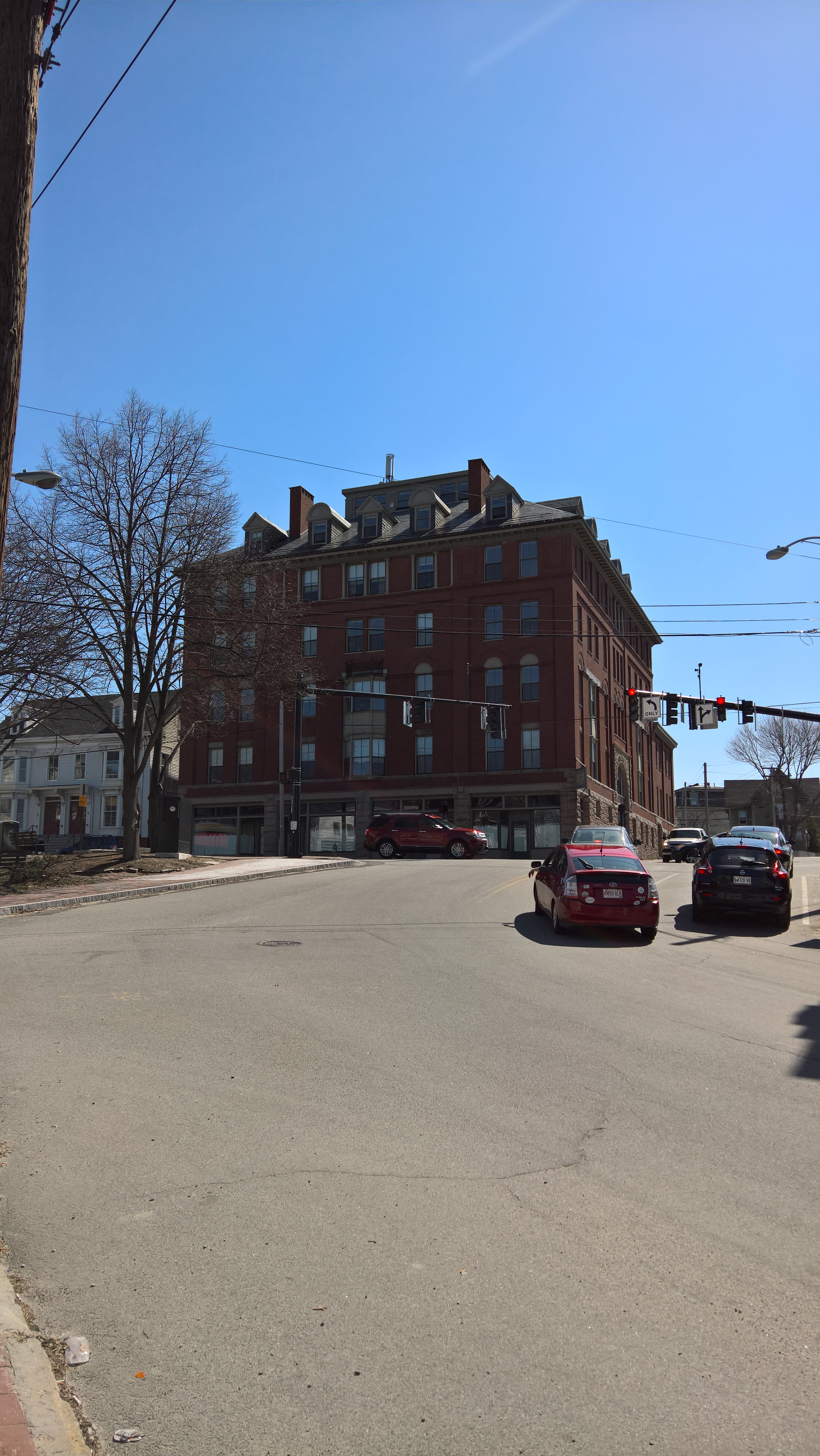
Carr was born at Holt Hall in Portland, Maine when it was the Maine Eye and Ear Infirmary.

Carr was born in Portland, Maine, to Frances Stokes Sutton and Howard Louis Carr Sr. (1905–2008). His early childhood was split between Palm Beach, Florida, where his father worked at The Breakers Palm Beach and Greensboro, North Carolina, where his mother worked as a secretary to a local CEO.

After Carr's mother took a job as the assistant to the headmaster at Deerfield Academy, a boarding school in Deerfield, Massachusetts, Carr received a scholarship to the school. After four years at the school, Carr was accepted into Brown University, but could not attend due to a lack of funds, so he attended the University of North Carolina at Chapel Hill (UNC). At UNC, Carr was a member of Phi Beta Kappa and wrote at student newspaper The Daily Tar Heel and graduated in 1973.

== Career ==
=== Journalism ===
Carr began his career as a reporter for the Winston-Salem Journal before returning to New England in 1979 as assistant city editor for the Boston Herald American (now the Boston Herald). From 1980 to 1981, he was the Boston City Hall bureau chief of the Herald American, and he later worked as the paper's State House bureau chief. As a political reporter for WNEV (now WHDH) in 1982, his coverage of then-mayor Kevin White was so relentless that after the mayor announced he was not running again, he told The Boston Globe that one of the things he enjoyed most about his impending retirement was not having Carr chase him around the city.

Carr has criticized former Globe and Herald guest columnist Mike Barnicle for years. In 1998, Barnicle resigned from the Globe over allegations of plagiarism and fabrication of stories. A Globe column by Steve Bailey stated that Carr gave out Barnicle's home phone number, an allegation Carr denies. Barnicle called Carr "a pathetic figure", and asked "Can you imagine being as consumed with envy and jealousy toward me for as long as it has consumed him?"

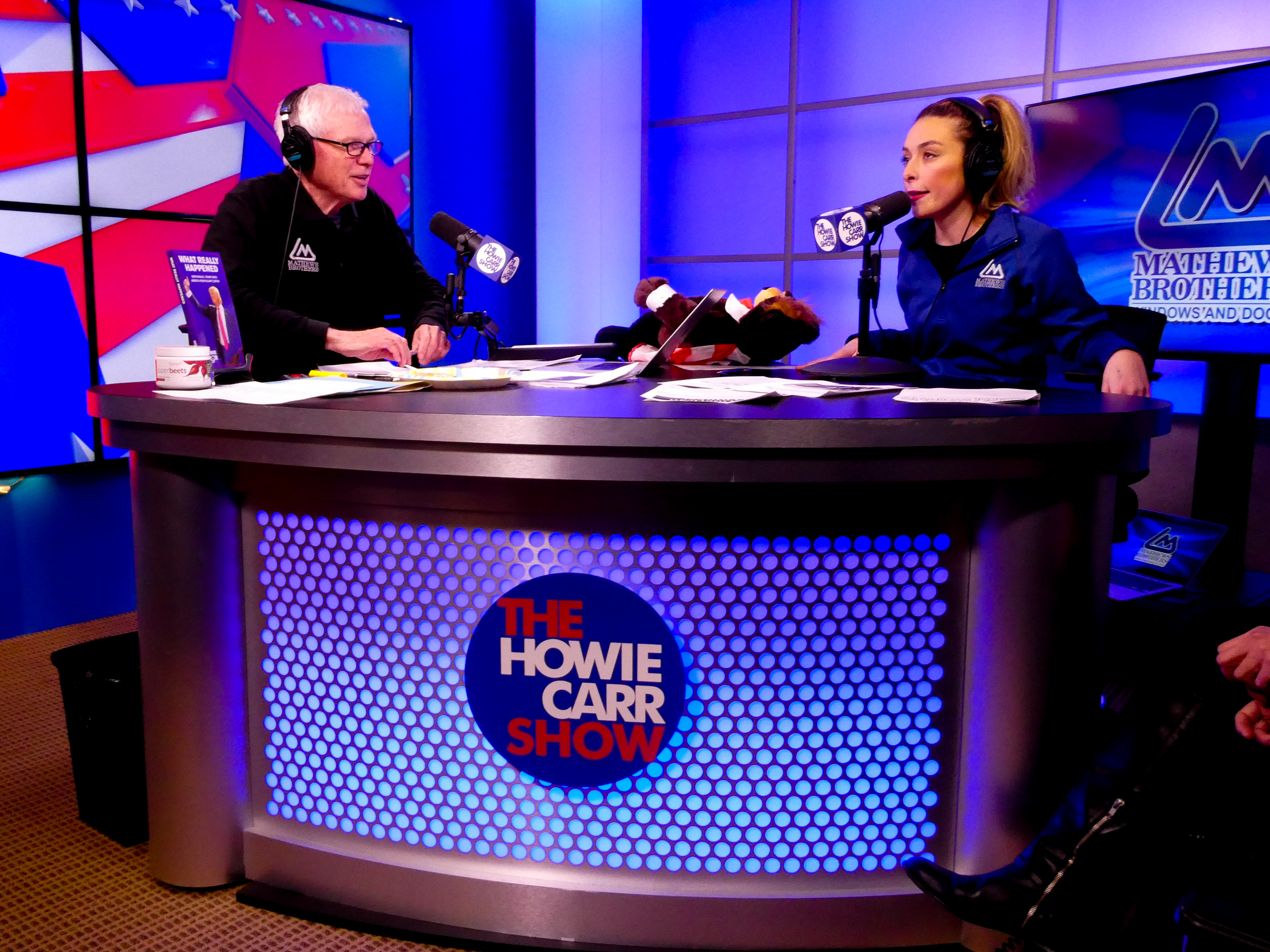
Howie Carr and co-executive producer Grace Curley

In 1998, Don Imus claimed Carr's wife was having an affair with boxer Riddick Bowe. Mrs. Carr retained Alan Dershowitz as her lawyer. The parties reached an undisclosed settlement. In a 2007 column, Carr alleged that Barnicle incited Imus' statements. According to Carr, Barnicle told Imus that Carr had said Imus "would die before his kid got out of high school".

In 2002, the Herald and Carr were the subjects of a lawsuit by Superior Court Judge Ernest Murphy. The newspaper reported that Murphy had said of a fourteen-year-old rape victim: "She can't go through life as a victim. She's 14. She got raped. Tell her to get over it." He was also alleged to have said of a 79-year-old robbery victim: "I don't care if she's 109." Carr, in a front-page column on February 20, 2002, criticized Murphy for setting low cash bails in rape cases and included references to his daughters, wondering what Murphy would do if it were one of his offspring that had been the victim. Murphy denied all of the allegations and claimed the newspaper libeled him, ruining his physical and emotional health and damaging his career and reputation as a good man. Ultimately, Murphy won the suit and was awarded a $2.09 million payment. During the trial, when asked what his reaction was to the Carr column, Murphy had said he "wanted to kill him".

=== Broadcasting ===
Carr has hosted local Boston weekday radio talk-shows since the 1980s on WRKO (AM 680). The Howie Carr Show has since become syndicated on more than twenty-five radio stations throughout northern and central New England, and can be heard elsewhere via live streaming on HowieCarrShow.com. In November 2014, Carr left syndicator Entercom Communications and formed his own Howie Carr Radio Network.

Video sample of a live broadcast from Howie Carr's Needham, MA studio.

WRKO had announced it would not carry the show but on March 9, 2015, it became an affiliate on March 16, 2015.

In September 2016, the pay television channel Newsmax TV began simulcasting The Howie Carr Show.

Carr has filled in for several nationally syndicated talk show hosts, including Mark Levin and Dennis Miller.

He has also worked as a reporter and commentator for Boston television stations WGBH-TV and WLVI.

=== Literature ===
Carr has written non-fiction books about Boston gangsters, the Kennedy family, and two novels.

==== Non-fiction ====
Winter Hill Gang series

In early 2006, Carr became a book author with the publication of The New York Times-rated best-seller The Brothers Bulger, about brothers Billy and Whitey Bulger. Whitey was the third boss of the Winter Hill Gang. Carr's second book, Hitman, was released in April 2011, two months before Whitey Bulger (then under the name Charlie Gasko) was arrested after sixteen years on the run. A book about Johnny Martorano, Hitman was also rated a best-seller by The New York Times. In 2013, Rifleman: The Untold Story of Stevie Flemmi was published. It was followed a year later by Ratman: The Trial and Conviction of Whitey Bulger.

Billy Bulger's power as President of the Massachusetts Senate intrigued Carr. He began to research both the politician and his gangster brother. Indeed, Carr's arrival on Madison Street in Somerville, Massachusetts, in the late 1970s meant he was perfectly placed to do just that, for Somerville's Marshall Motors garage (at 12 Marshall Street; now a church) was an early base of the Winter Hill Gang. In 1978, the second leader of the Winter Hill Gang, Howie Winter, who lived one street away from Carr, on Montrose Street, was jailed on federal "horse race fixing" charges. After he fled Boston due to a pending federal indictment, Bulger succeeded him and remained the boss until 1995. Whitey was on the FBI's Ten Most Wanted list from 1999 until his arrest in Santa Monica, California, on June 22, 2011. He had a $2 million bounty on his head. Kevin Weeks replaced Bulger but was arrested and imprisoned in 2000. He was released in 2005 after having served as a cooperating witness for the FBI.

While Carr believes Whitey Bulger wanted him dead ("his greatest regret is not killing me"), due to his finger-pointing at Billy Bulger, he disputes Kevin Weeks' claim that they were close to killing him by either blowing him up with explosives placed inside a basketball, or by shooting him from a cemetery across the street from Carr's former home at 91 Concord Road in Acton, Massachusetts. Whitey and Weeks had knowledge of Carr's residence because Carr was a neighbor of one of Weeks' brothers.

My problems started when I wrote a magazine story quoting the then-mayor of Boston, Kevin White. During cutaways after a TV interview, a reporter asked White about the source of Billy Bulger's almost absolute power at the State House. "If my brother threatened to kill you", the four-term mayor replied in footage that never aired, "you'd be nothing but nice to me". When I printed the exchange, the Bulgers were enraged. But I had it on videotape. It was undeniable.

Whitey knew what Carr looked like, from Carr's job on television. "Plus, I was in his neighborhood every day. But I never ventured into Whitey's package store." The store in question was South Boston Liquor Mart (also known as Stippo's; now Rotary Liquors), at 295 Old Colony Avenue, which Whitey had extorted from its legitimate owner.

The anchor at my TV station was the son of a former mayor of Boston. He lived in Southie, and patronized the Liquor Mart. One night the clerk struck up a conversation with him. "How come Howie never comes in here?" he asked. My friend shrugged. "You tell him," the clerk said, "that if he comes in, we got a fresh dumpster waitin' for him out back."

Carr began taking whatever precautions he could to keep Whitey and Weeks off his tail. "The key to staying alive, I quickly figured out, was to avoid becoming a creature of habit. Wiseguys (or anyone else) who don't mix up their routines are the ones who inevitably get caught 'flat-footed,' to use the old expression. I drove home a different way every evening. If possible, when I parked, I backed into the space so that, if I had to, I could flee more quickly. I stopped meeting face-to-face with anyone I didn't know. I stayed out of bars, especially in Southie. Occasionally I'd sleep somewhere other than my house. The local cops kept an eye on my house in the pre-dawn hours. Slowly the noose began to tighten around Whitey's neck and I relaxed somewhat. Whitey vanished in late 1994, but Weeks was still lurking about. At a tanning salon, he bragged to a Herald photographer that he knew that I had lived next to a graveyard. He mentioned nothing about any C-4 or high-powered rifles, but when he was arrested in 1999 his indirect threats against me were included in a DEA detention warrant." "I was always looking over my shoulder," Carr explained four years after Whitey's arrest. "The day he went missing, I was driving down the street, and on the radio, they said he had disappeared. For the first time in ten years, I didn't have to look over my shoulder."

Kennedy family

Carr's book Kennedy Babylon: A Century of Scandal and Depravity, Volume I, was released in 2015 and Volume II was released in 2018.

==== Fiction ====
In 2012, Carr moved into fictional writing with his third book, Hard Knocks, which was followed three years later by Killers, his sixth and most recent release.

=== Relationship with Donald Trump ===
During Donald Trump's 2016 presidential campaign, Carr hosted rallies, and he had lunch with the candidate on his private jet. On June 29, 2016, Carr, as an opening speaker at a rally for Trump in Bangor, Maine, made a Native American "war whoop" when referring to Democratic Senator Elizabeth Warren of Massachusetts. Carr had candidate Trump on his radio show more than a dozen times, including election night.

In 2017, Carr and his wife Kathy became members of The Mar-a-Lago Club, a Trump-owned resort and hotel for dues-paying members.

== Personal life ==
Previously living in Somerville and Acton, Carr has lived in Wellesley, Massachusetts, since 1993 with his second wife, Kathy Stimpson (whom he refers to as his "mailroom manager"), a Wellesley realtor, and their three daughters. Carr also has two daughters from a previous marriage. Though he criticized others for doing the same, Carr had a rent-controlled apartment in Cambridge in 1993 next to Harvard's Sackler Museum.

In March 2007, Carr had a melanoma removed from his forehead.

In 2009, Carr crashed his car into a telephone pole on Wellesley Avenue in Wellesley. He was not injured but was cited for a marked-lanes violation.

In November 2014, Carr was injured in another car crash, this time on the Massachusetts Turnpike. He was taken to the hospital after the accident, which occurred around 1:00 pm, but was released that evening.

On November 25, 2018, Carr tweeted "Fell off my bike early this morning." Later in the day he tweeted, "Broke my elbow and fractured my wrist. I'll be OK."

During his show on May 8, 2023, Carr passed out on the air while interviewing a sponsor. An hour later, fellow host Grace Curley announced that Carr caught a virus from his grandson and had been checked into the hospital. Carr took the next day off and slowly eased back into the show over the rest of the week with guest hosts filling in.

== Awards and recognition ==
- Carr has frequently been listed on the Talkers Magazine list known as the "Heavy Hundred". The list ranks talk-show hosts from around the U.S. whom the trade journal considers the most popular, influential, or entertaining. First listed in 2007, Carr was most recently ranked 17th, in 2024.
- Carr was inducted into the National Radio Hall of Fame in 2008.
- In 1985, Carr won the National Magazine Award for Essays and Criticism.
- In television, he has been nominated for an Emmy Award.

== Bibliography ==
Non-fiction

- The Brothers Bulger: How They Terrorized and Corrupted Boston for a Quarter Century, New York: Warner Books, 2006, ISBN 0-446-57651-4
- Hitman: The Untold Story of Johnny Martorano: Whitey Bulger's Enforcer and the Most Feared Gangster in the Underworld, New York: Forge Books, 2011, ISBN 0-765-32639-6
- Rifleman: The Untold Story of Stevie Flemmi, Frandel, 2013, ISBN 0986037206
- Ratman: The Trial And Conviction of Whitey Bulger, Frandel, 2014, ISBN 978-1461956655
- Kennedy Babylon: A Century of Scandal and Depravity, Volume 1, Frandel, 2017, ISBN 978-0986193309
- What Really Happened: How Donald J. Trump Saved America From Hillary Clinton, Frandel, 2018, ISBN 0986193313

Fiction

- Hard Knocks, New York: Forge Books, 2012, ISBN 076532640X
- Killers, New York: Forge Books, 2015, ISBN 978-0765333742

== Filmography ==
- A Civil Action (1998): The film is based on the real-life case of Anderson v. Cryovac, Inc. that took place in Woburn, Massachusetts, during the 1980s. Carr played a radio talk show host.
