= CoreSite =

American data center provider

- A CoreSite data center in Denver, Colorado
- Type: Subsidiary
- Industry: Real estate investment trust
- Founded: 2001; 25 years ago (as CRG West)
- Headquarters: Denver, Colorado, U.S.
- Products: Data centers
- Revenue: ▲US$572 million (2019)
- Net income: ▼US$99 million (2019)
- Total assets: ▲US$2.10 billion (2019)
- Total equity: ▼US$213 million (2019)
- Number of employees: 464 (2019)
- Parent: American Tower
- Website: coresite.com

CoreSite, a subsidiary of American Tower, owns carrier-neutral data centers and provides colocation and peering services.

As of June 24, 2022 the company owned 27 operating data center facilities in 10 markets comprising over 4.6 million net rentable square feet. The properties are in Boston, Chicago, Denver, Los Angeles, Miami, New York City, Northern Virginia, San Francisco/San Jose, California, Santa Clara, California, Atlanta, Georgia, Orlando, Florida, and the Washington, D.C. areas. The company has over 1,350 customers including enterprises, network operators, cloud providers, and supporting service providers.

== History ==
The company was founded in 2001 as CRG West at two of the West coast's original carrier hotels: Market Post Tower and One Wilshire.

In August 2005, the company opened a facility in Washington, D.C.

In June 2009, the company changed its name to CoreSite.

In September 2010, the company became a public company via an initial public offering.

In August 2012, Coresite became the first AMS-IX enabled data center operator in North America.

In July 2016, Tom Ray, the chief executive officer of the company, retired and was replaced by Paul Szurek, lead independent director.

In December 2021, the company was acquired by American Tower.

== Acquisitions ==
In May 2007, the company acquired properties in Boston and Chicago. It also purchased a tract of land in Santa Clara, with the intent of developing a 50-megawatt data center Coronado campus there.

In April 2012, the company acquired Comfluent and entered the Denver market.

In August 2016, the company announced the $60 million acquisition of the 22-acre Sunrise Technology Park from Brookfield Office Properties.

== Controversies ==
In February 2026, CoreSite refused to attend a Denver City Hall meeting as a last ditch effort to avoid community discussion for a proposed data center development plan in the Globeville neighborhood, which sparked further outrage from nearby residents.

== See also ==
- List of Internet exchange points
