= Jeff Kuhner =

Canadian-American political pundit (1969-)

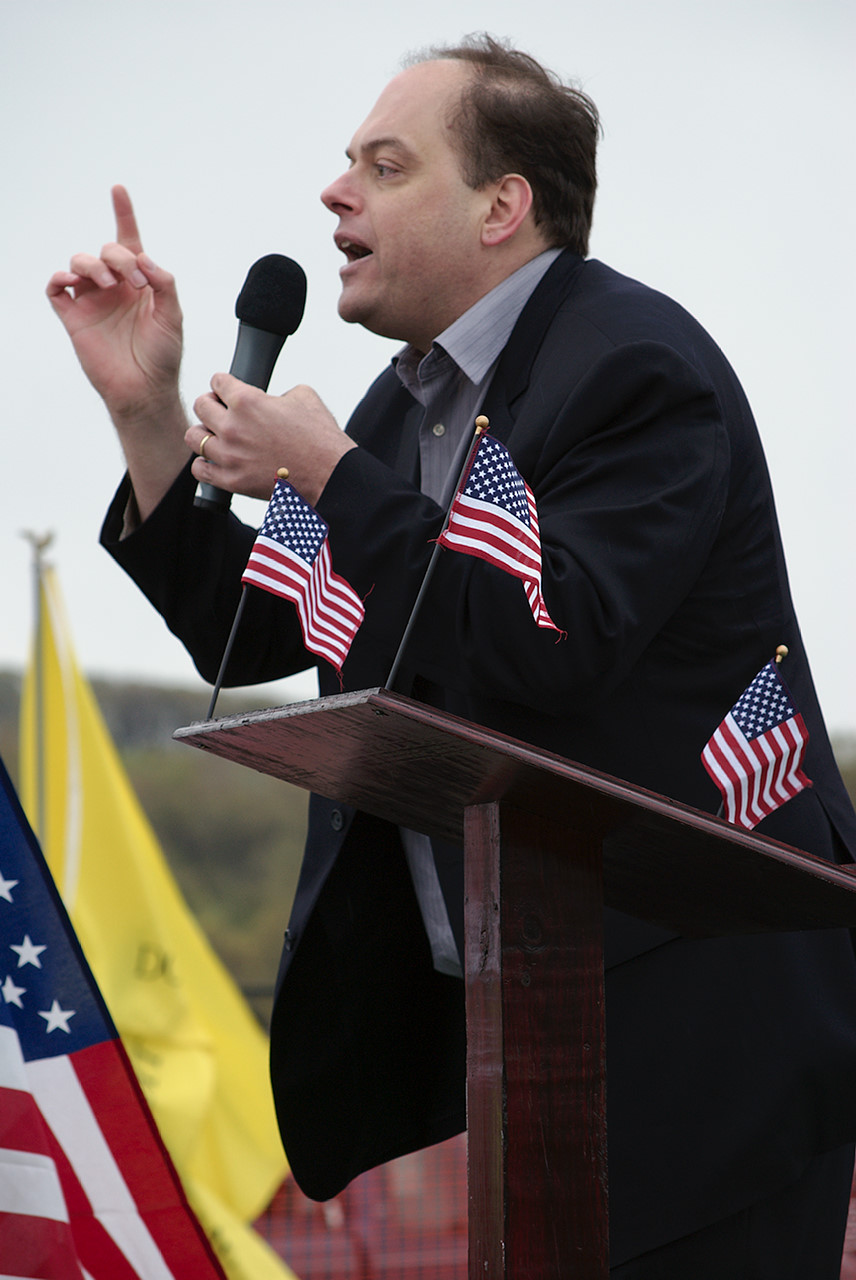
- Kuhner speaking in 2010
- Born: Jeffrey Thomas Kuhner; 1 September 1969 (age 56); Montreal, Quebec, Canada
- Citizenship: Canada; USA (2016)
- Education: Concordia University (B.A); Queens University (M.A.); Ohio University (doctoral studies)
- Occupations: Radio talk show host Commentator; Journalist; Professor and educator
- Employer: WRKO
- Known for: radio personality and commentator
- Height: 6 ft 3 in (191 cm)
- Spouse: Grazia ("Grace") Vuoto
- Children: 2
- Parent: Jack Wendelin Kuhner

Jeffrey Thomas Kuhner (born 1 September 1969) is an American talk radio host and political commentator, heard on weekdays from 6 am to 10 am on WRKO AM 680 in Boston, Massachusetts. He was the editor of Insight on the News and a regular contributor to the commentary pages of The Washington Times, and his articles have appeared in Human Events, National Review Online, and Investor's Business Daily.

== Early life and education ==
Kuhner was born in Montreal, Quebec, Canada, to Croatian immigrant parents and graduated from Laval Catholic High School.

He received his undergraduate degree from Concordia University in Montreal and his master's degree from Queens University in Kingston, Ontario, Canada. Kuhner did PhD coursework at Ohio University in the United States but did not complete a dissertation.

== Career ==
Kuhner was an academic lecturer who taught Modern United States History at McGill University in Montreal, Canada from 1998 to 2000.

In 2000, being disappointed by being offered only a one year extension to his appointment by the university and citing "the political correctness ... prevalent in academia" on his website, he left the university to become an assistant national editor at The Washington Times. In 2003, he left the newspaper to work for the Republican policy group the Ripon Society as communications director of the Ripon Forum.

Kuhner was the editor of the US news magazine website Insight on the News from October 2005 until its closing in May 2008. Simultaneously, Kuhner worked at the Thomas B. Fordham Institute, an education-policy organization, as its communications director. He was president of the Edmund Burke Institute for American Renewal, a now-dormant Washington D.C. think tank devoted to integrating minorities into the conservative movement. Until January 2012, the Burke Institute produced an online monthly magazine, Reflections, to which he regularly contributed.

In 2007, Insight on the News claimed that the presidential campaign of Hillary Clinton planned to accuse rival Barack Obama of attending a madrasa. Insight's story praised Obama's character in contrast to Hillary Clinton. Kuhner described Obama as "genteel, articulate, poised and charming. He is a Harvard-educated lawyer, yet he remains accessible to the common man." Five years later, however, Kuhner wrote in the Washington Times: "President Obama's re-election was more than a victory for liberalism. It represented America's collective suicide—a national push into a fiscal, cultural and moral abyss. We are sliding toward Greece."

In October 2008, Kuhner wrote: "Moscow's main aim is to wrest the Crimean Peninsula from Kiev's control. A majority of the Crimea’s inhabitants are ethnic Russians. ... But Ukraine is not Georgia; it is a large, militarily powerful country with long memories of Russian domination. Any attempt at partition by Moscow would be met by fierce resistance. It would spark a bloody Russo-Ukrainian war. This would inevitably drag in Poland and the Baltic States – all of which are members of NATO. Mr. Putin’s bellicose nationalism threatens to ignite a European conflagration."

In May 2012, Kuhner wrote: "The center of world fascism is no longer Berlin, but Tehran. Iran's theocratic regime not only denies the Holocaust, it seeks to complete Hitler's Final Solution: the annihilation of the Jewish people and the Jewish state, Israel. This is why it is desperate to attain the bomb."

Kuhner began his weekly column at The Washington Times in June 2008. In 2010, a Kuhner op-ed described Julian Assange as a terrorist threat and called for his assassination. In September 2013, Kuhner criticized Barack Obama's support for Syrian rebels fighting government troops: "Mr. Obama’s decision ... to arm the rebels has created a dangerous security threat to America — and the Middle East. The reason is simple: U.S. weapons will inevitably fall into the hands of jihadist groups."

== Radio career ==
In November 2009, Kuhner became the host of The Kuhner Show, on 570 WTNT in Washington, D.C. The show was canceled after WTNT became a sports station in September 2010. Kuhner began a regular feature on WRKO in Boston, called The Kuhner Report, in which he called into the WRKO Morning Show with reports on national politics. In 2012, he began hosting his own show on WRKO, still called The Kuhner Report. Initially, he had two disconnected morning hours; in October 2012, the show moved to the 6 to 10 am time slot, in July 2015, the show moved to the midday slot (noon to 3 pm) as WRKO stopped carrying Rush Limbaugh, and on 26 November 2018, the show moved back to morning drive time.

In September 2017, Kuhner confronted Massachusetts Senator Elizabeth Warren in the hallway of WRKO and said it was hypocritical to criticize the wealthiest "One Percent" of Americans in view of her own net worth. Sen. Warren rebutted the charge.

Kuhner writes an occasional column on partisan politics called "Kuhner's Corner", carried on the WRKO website and on local niche media such as the Boston Broadside.

In addition to his own shows, Kuhner has guest-hosted The Howie Carr Show on WRKO, and syndicated programs The Mark Levin Show and The Savage Nation.

== Personal life ==
Kuhner is married to Dr. Grazia ("Grace") Vuoto, a former editorial writer for The Washington Times. and a former assistant professor of Modern British and European History at Howard University in Washington D.C. (2002-2006), Virginia Commonwealth University (2001-2002), and McGill University in Montreal, Canada (1996-2000). She has hosted conservative talk shows on WBIX and WMEX, and has also been a content producer. She completed her Ph.D. thesis in 1999 under the supervision of Elizabeth Elbourne at McGill University on the topic of Lord Salisbury, "revising the existing historiography by demonstrating that Salisbury's Christian faith was a central feature of his approach to diplomatic and imperial affairs". Dr. Vuoto now works as a real estate salesperson, is a writer and columnist, and also raises their two children.

Grace often calls into The Kuhner Report radio show, identified as "Doctor Grace / Putting Liberals in their place" though Kuhner typically drops hints after the call that the caller is his wife and that he "definitely married up".

The couple have two children, Ashton and Ava, who figure as examples in many of Kuhner's presentations.

Kuhner was naturalized as a U.S. citizen in the summer of 2016.

Jeff Kuhner's father, Jack Wendelin Kuhner, passed away in Montreal, Canada on 30 December 2024 and his funeral Mass was held at St. Nicholas Church in Montreal. Jack Kuhner worked for Velan Inc. which was a manufacturer of high grade industrial valves. He was one of their first field sales technicians, traveling all over the world.

== See also ==
- WRKO
- The Washington Times
- Insight on the News
