= Newsmax TV =

American cable news channel

- Logo as of 2021
- Country: United States
- Broadcast area: Nationwide

Programming
- Language: English
- Picture format: 1080i HDTV (downscaled to widescreen 480i for SDTVs)

Ownership
- Owner: Newsmax
- Key people: Christopher Ruddy; (CEO and Founder)
- Sister channels: Newsmax2; Newsmax en Español

History
- Launched: June 16, 2014; 12 years ago

Links
- Website: www.newsmaxtv.com (live stream available to U.S. pay-TV and Newsmax+ subscribers)

Availability

Streaming media
- Service(s): DirecTV Stream, FuboTV, Hulu + Live TV, Sling TV, Vidgo, YouTube TV

Newsmax TV (or simply Newsmax) is an American television channel owned by Newsmax described as conservative, pro-Trump, right-wing, and far-right. The network primarily focuses on political opinion-based talk shows. It carries a news/talk format throughout the day and night, with documentaries and films on weekends.

The channel was created by American journalist and Newsmax CEO Christopher Ruddy. It launched on June 16, 2014, to 35 million satellite subscribers through DirecTV and Dish Network. As of May 2019, the network reaches about 75 million cable homes and has wide streaming and digital media player/mobile device availability. The channel primarily broadcasts from Newsmax's studio on Manhattan's East Side in New York City, with headquarters in Boca Raton, Florida and Washington, D.C.

CEO Christopher Ruddy has compared the network to Fox News. In August 2020, The Washington Post described Newsmax as "a landing spot for cable news personalities in need of a new home", citing the network's hiring of Mark Halperin and Bill O'Reilly following their resignations from other networks due to allegations of sexual harassment. Similarly, Newsmax has hired many former Fox News program hosts, including Greg Kelly, Rob Schmitt, Bob Sellers, and Heather Childers.

== History ==
=== Network launch ===
In May 2014, U.S. news organization Newsmax announced that it had signed a distribution deal with DirecTV and would launch a national television news channel to compete directly with CNN, Fox News, and other American news networks. It was launched to provide independent news; its founder, Chris Ruddy described it as intended to be a "kinder, gentler Fox News," saying that "Our goal is to be a little more boomer-oriented, more information-based rather than being vituperative and polarizing."

Around the time of the channel launch, Businessweek Bloomberg profiled Ruddy and Newsmax in a feature story entitled "The Next Ailes: Newsmax's Chris Ruddy Preps TV Rival to Fox News. Businessweek Bloomberg reported that Newsmax planned to build off its success as a digital media player to challenge Fox News in the traditional cable arena while developing a stake in the emerging streaming OTT business.

A Fast Company report in December 2020 suggested Newsmax was on a course to "dethrone" Fox with its streaming digital strategy by offering the channel for free to platforms like Roku, YouTube, Pluto TV, Xumo, Samsung TV Plus and others. "You wouldn't know it by looking at cable TV ratings, but Fox News has a problem on its hands," Fast Company wrote, noting that "When you factor in Newsmax's streaming audience, the race between the two right-wing news networks is closer than you might think."

On January 16, 2016, Dennis Michael Lynch: Unfiltered debuted on the channel. The program ended after the first segment of the August 10, 2016, episode after Lynch announced that he would resign from the network and made comments defending Fox News Channel and criticizing his network for its reporting of the Trump campaign and suggesting they were restricting his editorial control; he was escorted out from the network's New York studio during what would have been the first commercial break. It was replaced the next Monday with an hour-long video simulcast of radio's The Howie Carr Show from WRKO in Boston.

Beginning in 2020, the network significantly ramped up programming, adding evening shows with Greg Kelly, a former Fox News and local affiliate host, and Grant Stinchfield, a former NBC local correspondent and ex-NRA TV host. The network launched Spicer & Co. on March 3, 2020, featuring former Trump White House Press Secretary Sean Spicer and co-host Lyndsay Keith, Historically, the network started out with a documentary-heavy lineup, but as of 2022, replays of daily and weekend shows make up the bulk of the network's late night programming, like most news channels.

=== 2020 election ===
During the 2020 United States presidential election, then-President Trump began to promote Newsmax over rival competitor Fox News. Trump's preference for Newsmax over Fox News became clearer after the latter became the first news outlet to call Arizona for Democratic challenger Joe Biden. Newsmax has made their more conservative leanings a selling point to disaffected Fox News viewers, as well as employing Fox News alumni to join their lineup on Newsmax TV, such as Rob Schmitt and Greg Kelly.

After the election was won by Democrat Joe Biden, Newsmax struck a defiant tone, focusing on conspiracy theories and allegations of voter fraud as a way to attract Fox News viewers angered by what they saw as insufficient loyalty to Trump. Emily VanDerWerff of Vox reported that the outlet did not "go full arch-conservative" and "doesn't give airtime to QAnon paranoiacs", but that it "spent lots of time arguing that other media outlets jumped the gun in calling the election for Biden and that Trump still has a path to win this thing." Newsmax was thus positioned further to the right of Fox but less so than One America News Network, another conservative news channel that embraced a far-right editorial stance during and after the Trump administration.

CNN's Brian Stelter, in an on-air interview, asked Newsmax CEO Christopher Ruddy why the network chose to air "election denialism" and "bogus voter fraud stuff," to which Ruddy replied that the network featured all points of view and argued that all of the other major news outlets who had reported Biden's election win were "rushing."

Newsmax agreed to pay $40 million to Smartmatic and $67 million to Dominion Voting Systems to settle defamation lawsuits brought by those companies over claims that voting machines were rigged during the 2020 election.

=== 2021–present ===
Since the election, Newsmax has seen increasing viewership; according to Nielsen, Newsmax averaged 182,000 viewers in the week leading up to the election. In the week that followed, the average increased further with daily averages around 400,000 viewers, with Greg Kelly Reports and Spicer & Co. having attracted numbers in the 700,000–800,000 range. On December 7, 2020, Greg Kelly Reports beat its timeslot competitor on Fox News, The Story with Martha MacCallum, in average key demographic viewership for the first time (229,000 to 203,000), while Stelter observed that overall the program "has nearly a million viewers on a good night".

A small number of cable providers, including Breezeline (formerly Atlantic Broadband), dropped the channel in January 2022. The company stated that the decision was not based on the network's content, but because of Newsmax wanting to move to more traditional retransmission consent arrangements where providers pay to carry the network (rather than Newsmax paying providers to carry the channel), while simultaneously being available at no charge via YouTube and free ad-supported streaming television (FAST) platforms. Newsmax planned to discontinue its free online streams by the end of 2023.

As of October 2022, Newsmax was in a distant fourth place among the cable news channels, behind Fox News, CNN and MSNBC but ahead of NewsNation.

On January 25, 2023, Newsmax TV was removed from the satellite and streaming versions of DirecTV and U-verse after their carriage agreement expired; the network sought to convert from paying DirecTV for carriage to a retransmission consent arrangement. DirecTV subsequently replaced Newsmax TV with the competing conservative network The First TV. While DirecTV isn't required by law to carry cable news channels with differing political agendas, this particular carriage dispute invoked strong rebukes from conservative lawmakers like Florida governor Ron DeSantis, who characterised the dispute as "censorship." DirecTV and Newsmax settled their dispute on March 22, 2023.

Newsmax's retransmission consent agreement with DirecTV and others required it to wind down the free streaming simulcast of its cable news channel, which it did on November 1, 2023. In its place on free ad-supported streaming television providers, Newsmax launched "Newsmax2," which includes headline rundowns and shorter 'best-of' clips of Newsmax programming. Newsmax+ was then launched as a paid monthly subscription service, carrying the traditional feed now exclusive to paid television providers.

== On-air personalities ==
=== Program hosts ===
Weekdays

- Bob Brooks: co-host of American Agenda
- Bianca de la Garza: host of Bianca Across the Nation
- Rob Finnerty: host of Finnerty
- Ed Henry: host of The Big Take
- Carl Higbie: host of Carl Higbie Frontline
- E. D. Hill: host of National Report
- Greg Kelly: host of Greg Kelly Reports
- Marc Lotter: co-host of Wake Up America
- Sharla McBride: co-host of Wake Up America
- Chris Plante: host of The Right Squad
- Rob Schmitt: host of Rob Schmitt Tonight
- Katrina Szish: co-host of American Agenda
- Greta Van Susteren: host of The Record

Weekends

- Rob Astorino: host of Saturday Agenda
- Tom Basile: host of America Right Now and fill-in host, former co-host of Wake Up America Weekend
- Kenzie Beach: co-host of Wake Up America Weekend
- Wendy Bell, host of Wendy Bell Common Sense
- Nancy Brinker: host of Conversations with Nancy Brinker
- Rita Cosby: host of Saturday Report
- Lidia Curanaj: host of Sunday Agenda
- Mark Kaye: host of The Mark Kaye Show
- Kyle Lowder: co-host of Wake Up America Weekend
- Dick Morris: host of Dick Morris Democracy
- Michael Savage: host of The Savage Nation

=== Correspondents and substitute anchors ===
- Chuck Holton – foreign correspondent
- Betsy McCaughey – fill-in host
- James Rosen – Chief White House correspondent
- Bob Sellers: also former host of American Agenda

=== Previous hosts ===
- Mike Huckabee: host of Huckabee (shared with TBN) (Appointed ambassador to Israel in the Trump administration)
- Steve Bannon: host of War Room (moved to Real America's Voice)
- Eric Bolling: host of Eric Bolling The Balance
- Herman Cain: was slated to host a show for Newsmax TV but died of COVID-19 before making it to series
- Howie Carr: host of The Howie Carr Show (later radio-only)
- Heather Childers: former co-host of American Agenda
- Callista Gingrich: former host of Let Freedom Ring
- Michael Grimm: co-host of Wake Up America Weekend
- Sebastian Gorka: former host of "The Gorka Reality Check"
- Chris Salcedo: host of The Chris Salcedo Show
- J. D. Hayworth: former host of Newsmax Prime and America's Forum
- Dennis Michael Lynch: former host of Dennis Michael Lynch: Unfiltered
- Michelle Malkin: former host of Michelle Malkin Sovereign Nation
- Steve Malzberg: former host of America Talks Live and The Steve Malzberg Show
- Bill O'Reilly: host of No Spin News with Bill O'Reilly (since moved to The F1rst)
- Joe Pags: host of The Joe Pags Show (later radio-only)
- Joe Pinion: former host of Saturday Agenda and fill-in host
- Wayne Allyn Root: host of The Wayne Allyn Root Show (later radio-only)
- Jesse Lee Peterson: host of The Jesse Lee Peterson Show (later radio-only)
- Emerald Robinson: former chief White House correspondent (later moved to FrankSpeech/LindellTV)
- Todd Schnitt: former host of The Schnitt Show
- Sean Spicer: former co-host of Spicer & Co.
- Grant Stinchfield: former host of Stinchfield (later moved to Real America's Voice)

=== Newsmax2 personalities ===
- John Bachman: host of John Bachman Now
- David Harris Jr.: host of The Pulse
- Ed Henry: host of Ed Henry the Briefing, also chief news anchor and executive editor
- Rick Leventhal: host of The Leventhal Report
- Todd Starnes: host of The Todd Starnes Show

== Former over-the-air affiliations ==
Before the DirecTV dispute and the network added more live news hours outside of overnights, Newsmax TV historically made its feed available to free-to-air terrestrial television affiliates. Currently, only a county-owned translator network in Millard County, Utah, along with Alexandria, Minnesota's Selective TV system continue to carry the main channel over-the-air.

The terms for DirecTV's new carriage deal for Newsmax TV required the network's remaining over-the-air affiliations and free online availability (outside some exceptions) to be withdrawn as of November 1, 2023, when that access ended and was replaced by a monthly subscription platform, Newsmax+, or TV Everywhere authentication with a paid television provider. Online providers and over-the-air stations began to carry a secondary channel, Newsmax2, featuring taped 'best-of' content with some simulcasting of the main channel's live schedule.
