= American Radio Systems =

Former US radio company

American Radio Systems Corporation
- Industry: Radio broadcasting
- Founded: 1993; 33 years ago
- Founder: Steven B. Dodge
- Defunct: 2005; 21 years ago
- Fate: Sold to Westinghouse
- Successor: CBS Radio; Entercom
- Headquarters: Boston, Massachusetts, USA
- Area served: United States
- Key people: Steven B. Dodge
- Parent: CBS Corporation (1997–2000); Viacom (2000–2005)

American Radio Systems Corporation was a radio company that existed from 1993 until 1998. Its predecessor, Atlantic Ventures, was founded by Steven B. Dodge, Eric Schultz, Joseph Winn, and Michael Milsom. American Radio Systems was formed from the merger of Atlantic Ventures, which owned four Boston radio stations, including WRKO and WEEI with Multi Market Communications, Inc. and Stoner Broadcasting System Holding, Inc., on November 1, 1993.

On August 14, 1995, American Radio Systems announced plans to acquire Hartford radio stations WTIC-AM and WTIC-FM for $42 million.

In June 1998, American Radio Systems became a wholly owned subsidiary of Westinghouse pursuant to a merger agreement. American Radio shareholders received $44.00 per share plus one share of American Tower common stock in a transaction valued at a then-record enterprise price of over $2.6 billion.
