= Dennis Michael Lynch =

American film producer

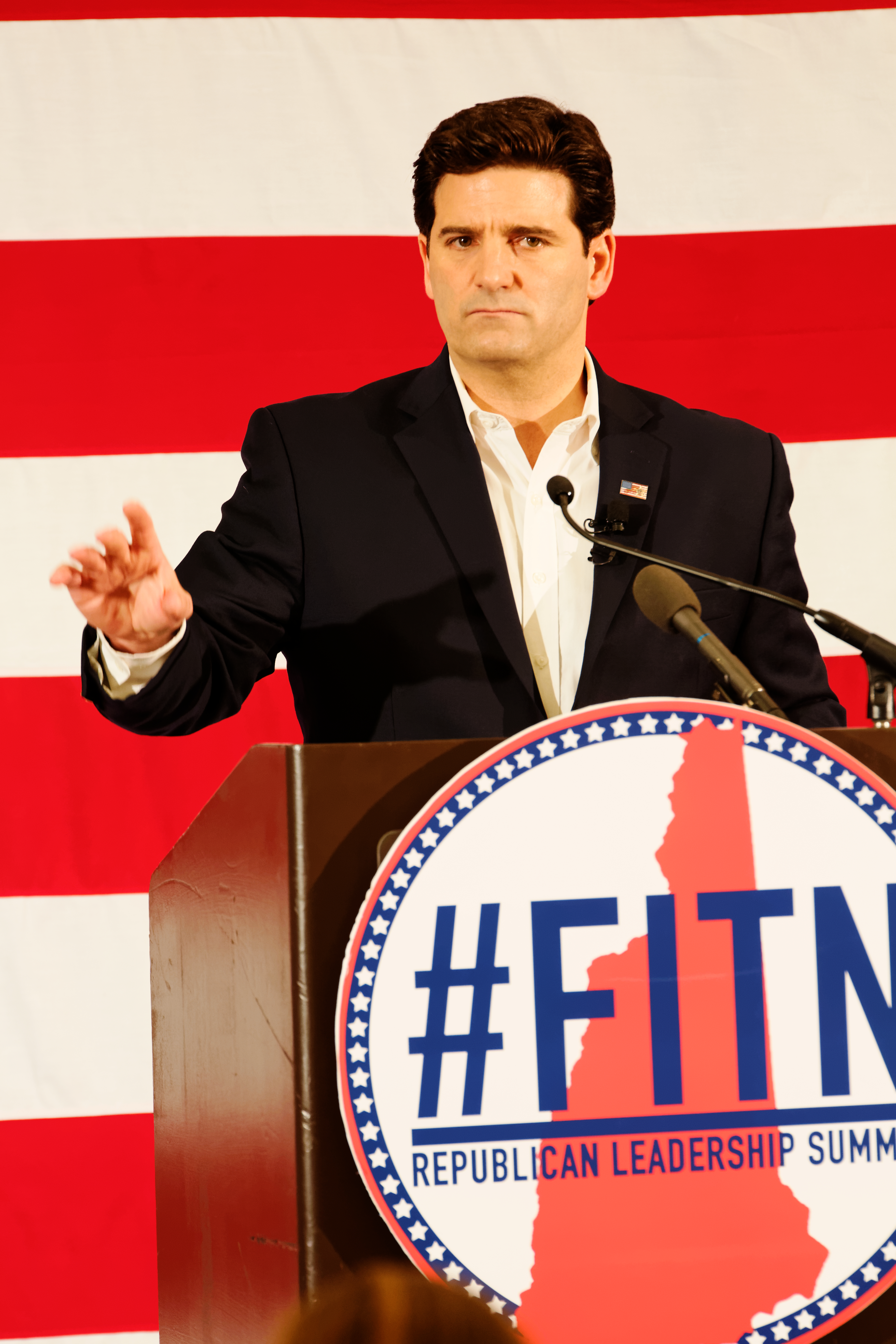
- Lynch in 2015
- Born: Dennis Michael Lynch; Hicksville, New York, U.S.
- Occupations: Founder and CEO of TeamDML Inc
- Known for: The Dennis Michael Lynch Podcas, creator of documentary films They Come to America, They Come to America II, They Come to America III, 'They Come to America IV, and 'United States of Tents
- Website: Official website

Dennis Michael Lynch also known as "DML", is an American businessman, documentary film maker, podcast host and news personality. Currently, he is retired. He was the founder and CEO of TeamDML Inc, a company specializing in the distribution of news programming, podcasts and digital films. He continues to operate TeamDML.com, an online membership-based service for people who wish to watch his daily podcast about politics and news. His Facebook audience is large, with 1.6 million followers. His new reel series called "reTIRED" is set to launch August 1, 2026.

== Early life ==
Lynch was raised in the blue collar suburb of Hicksville, New York. After graduating high school, he went on to attend the John Jay College of Criminal Justice at the City University of New York for a single semester.

== Career ==
=== Business ===
After dropping out of college, Lynch launched a computer recycling company called Lynx Technologies. In August 1999 Lynch secured $13 million from venture capitalists and John Sculley, the former CEO of Apple and Pepsi. In less than a year, Lynch expanded the company to 300 employees and five locations across the country, and renamed it TechSmart. As a result, in 2000 he was selected as the winner of Long Island's Ernst & Young Entrepreneur of the Year Award.

=== Films ===
In 2010, Lynch produced his first full-length documentary, King of the Hamptons. The film is about the serious impacts of a midlife crisis. The film features Billy Joel, Christie Brinkley, Alec Baldwin, and Ed Burns. It premiered at the Hamptons International Film Festival 2010.

In 2012, Lynch released a film about illegal immigration in the United States, They Come to America, written and directed by Lynch.

In 2012, Lynch begin filming They Come to America II. On July 4, 2013, Lynch appeared on a special episode of Hannity titled "The Cost of Amnesty" in which he, Sean Hannity, and other guests, discussed Lynch's latest movie They Come to America II: The Cost of Amnesty as well as the recent passage of the Senate immigration bill S744, terrorism, and unemployment.

In 2014, Lynch released his third film, titled We Ride to D.C. The film is about how the public has lost faith in the news media. As with all his films, Lynch released the documentary on DVD stating it was the best means of distribution when measuring the costs of running in theaters.

The following year, Lynch released 'They Come to America III.' The film focuses on the hardships of the Texas Border Patrol, and how they struggle to secure the border when Washington DC uses the topic of immigration as a political football.

Lynch also made a short film called, 'A Day At Bundy's.' The documentary focuses on the events that took place in 2014 when the Nevada-based Bundy family battled the federal government over land rights and grazing fees. Lynch, who was on assignment for Megyn Kelly and Fox News, stepped between federal agents and hundreds of Bundy supporters to help reach a peaceful resolution. Years later, Lynch was a key witness in the Bundy trial launched by the federal government. Lynch testified that he was a neutral observer who saw an opportunity to stop a massive shootout between citizens and the government. Megyn Kelly claimed on her Fox News program 'The Kelly File' that Lynch saved lives with his heroic actions.

In 2018, Lynch announced he was touring the United States in a 40-foot motorhome for one month starting May 14. In his announcement, Lynch said he was taking a break from the news business because he has grown tired of all the negativity. He also announced that his tour will include the making of two films.

The first film, 'America the Beautiful,' focuses on the beauty of the United States, its history and diverse people. However, Lynch announced he would change the project into an episode driven series instead of a film. The series is available exclusively to members of TeamDML.com

The second film focuses on the homeless epidemic in the U.S. The film, which was released on DVD and Amazon Prime in late 2019, is called UNITED STATES OF TENTS. Lynch and crew highlight the importance of finding a solution to the growing problem.

In fall 2019, Lynch launched They Come to America IV. The film focuses on the Trump administration's handling of border security. The film is available on DVD through Lynch's website DennisMichaelLynch.com, and will be available on Amazon Prime in spring 2020.

Lynch has also announced on his Facebook page that he has two more films in the works. The first is about school safety and the mass shooting in Parkland, Florida that took place on February 14, 2018. The second is called 'Fighting For America.' The film is about Lynch's experience of exploring a run for the presidency in 2016, and how he came to support Donald Trump for president despite clashing with the billionaire before the election.

=== Politics ===
On October 24, 2014, after being approached by members of the GOP in Arizona, Texas and Florida, Lynch announced on The Kelly File that he was exploring the possibilities of running for president in 2016. The Kelly File published a poll on Facebook asking if viewers would vote for Lynch. Over 10,000 responded to the poll, with 87% claiming they would vote for him.

On April 17, 2015, Lynch was one of nineteen presidential hopefuls to speak at the Republican Leadership Summit in New Hampshire. A few weeks later, on May 5, 2015, Lynch announced he would not run in 2016 stating multiple reasons, including his children being too young to endure a national campaign that would require his absence from home.

Following the mass shooting at Marjory Stoneman Douglas High School in Parkland, Florida, on February 14, 2018, Andrew Pollack asked Dennis Michael Lynch to help him get a school safety bill passed in Florida. Pollack, whose daughter Meadow was killed in the shooting, lobbied alongside Lynch for two days. Ultimately, they grabbed enough votes from Democrats and Republicans to get the bill passed. The bill was signed into law days later by Gov. Rick Scott.

=== Media ===
After years of guest appearance on Fox News Channel, on January 16, 2016, Lynch started hosting the news and commentary program Dennis Michael Lynch: Unfiltered on Newsmax TV. However, on August 10, 2016, he announced that it was his final show because the Newsmax TV management was demanding editorial control over all the Newsmax programs. Claiming he would not accept "being restricted," Lynch never returned to Newsmax.

Lynch hosts The Dennis Michael Lynch Podcast and created the DMLNewsApp, a news aggregation app fed from his news and commentary site DennisMichaelLynch.com.
