= Alan Lipman =

American psychologist

Alan J. Lipman
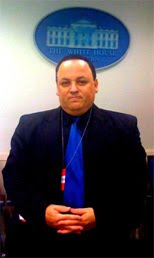
- Born: United States
- Education: Georgetown Law (J.D.); Temple (M.A., Clinical Psychology, Ph.D., Clinical Psychology); UConn (B.A., Psychology)
- Scientific career
- Fields: Psychology, Law, Music
- Workplaces: Georgetown University, Yale Psychiatric Institute, The George Washington University
- Website: dralanjlipman.blogspot.com

Alan J. Lipman is an American clinical psychologist and musician, who is currently a professor of psychiatry and behavioral sciences at the George Washington University Medical Center and the director of the Center for the Study of Violence.

He is based in Washington, D.C., studying causes of violence in adults and youth, mass and school shootings, murder and homicide. Lipman is also a commentator on the areas of violence, mass and school shootings, homicide, terrorism, psychology and psychotherapy, having served as commentator for various national media outlets. Lipman holds the M.A. and Ph.D. degrees in Clinical Psychology from Temple University as well as Juris Doctor from Georgetown University Law Center. As a musician, he performs credited as X-Patriate.

== Career ==
Lipman has served as a professor at Georgetown University, The George Washington University, and Rutgers University, and has also held positions at The Hospital of the University of Pennsylvania and Yale Psychiatric Institute. At Georgetown, he founded the Center for the Study of Violence as well as the Georgetown Youth Violence Summit. Lipman also served as co-chairman of the Academic Advisory Council of the White House Campaign Against Youth Violence, initiated at a White House summit during the Clinton Administration. He has also served as a consultant on the effects of September 11, 2001 to the U.S. Department of Health and Human Services and to the U.S. Department of State and is an Invited Member of the United Kingdom Peer Review College of the Economic and Social Research Council and an Invited Member of the editorial board of the scholarly journal Violence and Gender. He lectures both nationally and internationally on the subjects of violence, crime, terrorism, and their causes, after-effects, and prevention. He also writes on the psychology of Presidents, including Donald Trump.

== In the media ==
=== Commentator ===
Lipman has appeared on MSNBC, CNN, CNN Headline News, NBC Evening News, CBS, ABC News, Court TV, and the BBC.

Lipman also has an additional career as a composer, vocalist/multi-instrumentalist and recording artist.
