= The Howie Carr Show =

American radio talk-show

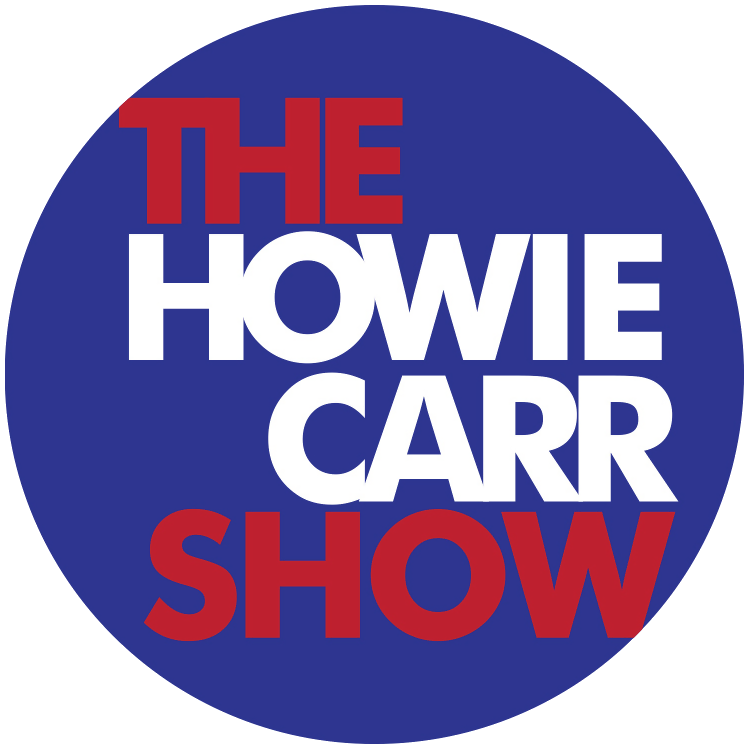
- Genre: Conservative talk
- Running time: 4 hours, weekdays
- Country of origin: USA
- Language: English
- Home station: WRKO
- Hosted by: Howie Carr
- Produced by: Taylor Cormier
- Recording studio: Brighton, Massachusetts
- Original release: 1994 – present
- Website: howiecarrshow.com

The Howie Carr Show is an American radio talk-show presented by journalist and author Howie Carr. Its flagship station is WRKO 680 in Boston, Massachusetts, on which the show airs every weekday between 2:00 p.m. and 6:00 p.m. PM. It is syndicated live in five states, while Rhode Island's WHJJ broadcasts a best-of on Sunday evenings. The show can be accessed worldwide via live streaming, in both audio and video formats, on Carr's own website, HowieCarrShow.com. The video stream, known as the HowieCam, is an embedded Rumble broadcast.

== History ==
Carr has hosted radio talk shows in Boston, Massachusetts, since the 1980s, briefly at WRKO/680 in late mornings, where he also shared an hour with liberal talk host Victoria Jones; then at WHDH/850; then (when WHDH became WEEI in 1994) back at WRKO.

Video of Howie Carr and Grace Curley broadcasting from the Needham, MA studio

He took over the afternoon drive-time slot from Jerry Williams, on whose show Carr often made appearances, originally during a segment called "The Governors," with Williams and anti-tax advocate Barbara Anderson.

National television networks occasionally record or simulcast the radio show following an event likely to provoke comments from callers. For example, on August 18, 1998, following a speech in which President Clinton admitted to some of the facts in the Lewinsky scandal, C-SPAN simulcast all four hours of the radio program.

=== Syndication ===
In September 1996, the show experimented with local syndication, sending the show out via ISDN connections to a group of stations around New England. The local experiment was such a success that, in January 1998, ABC Radio Today started syndicating the show nationally. The show did not sustain a large nationwide following and syndication was handed over to SupeRadio. In 2005, Entercom Communications, the owner of WRKO, took over syndication and the show was only offered to New England stations.

Newsmax TV began broadcasting live, daily simulcasts of the show nationally in September 2016.

=== Relationship with Entercom ===
On July 9, 2007, Carr announced he would leave WRKO when his contract expired that September and would begin hosting a weekday morning drive-time program on FM station WTKK. Greater Media, owner of WTKK, reportedly signed him for a five-year deal, though Entercom denies this happened. On September 19, 2007, the show went on hiatus, as Carr's contract expired and a court barred him from moving to WTKK, whose contract offer WRKO had matched. On November 16, Carr resumed hosting on WRKO, under a contract expiring in 2012. Entercom used its option to extend the contract, announcing that Carr would be a fixture on WRKO for the "foreseeable future."

Carr often disparaged Entercom on the air, sometimes reacting to equipment failures by saying "Entercom happens" (adapting the fatalistic expression "shit happens"). Carr was suspended for the week beginning April 16, 2010 for such remarks, though the penalty was concurrent with a scheduled vacation. Carr also disparaged the sports broadcasts that sometimes preempted the show (e.g. referring to the "very exciting Red Sox pre-game show" followed by a loud yawn sound effect) and WRKO's weak signal to the western suburbs in the evening.

Carr's contract with WRKO expired in September 2014 and he moved to WMEX on November 17, 2014. In March 2015, he returned to WRKO, broadcasting from the Armstrong Advisory Group headquarters on Station Street in Needham, Massachusetts, but with the station being an affiliate instead of his employer. Worcester affiliate WCRN handles the distribution. In the latter part of 2016 the show relocated to his current studio in the New Balance Building in Brighton. Carr took ownership of the program Affiliates other than WRKO retained the show and new affiliates in New Hampshire were added. As of his one-year anniversary as owner of the show, it had 24 affiliates in six states.

In 2016 Carr attempted to start a Saturday talk show with Curt Schilling as host; while it did appear on internet streaming, no affiliates could be found and it soon ended. Towards the end of 2017, Carr's tumultuous relationship with Entercom would end because of the CBS Radio/Entercom merger, with WRKO spun off to iHeartMedia as a part of the deal on December 19, 2017, to address market concentration concerns in Boston.

== Personnel ==
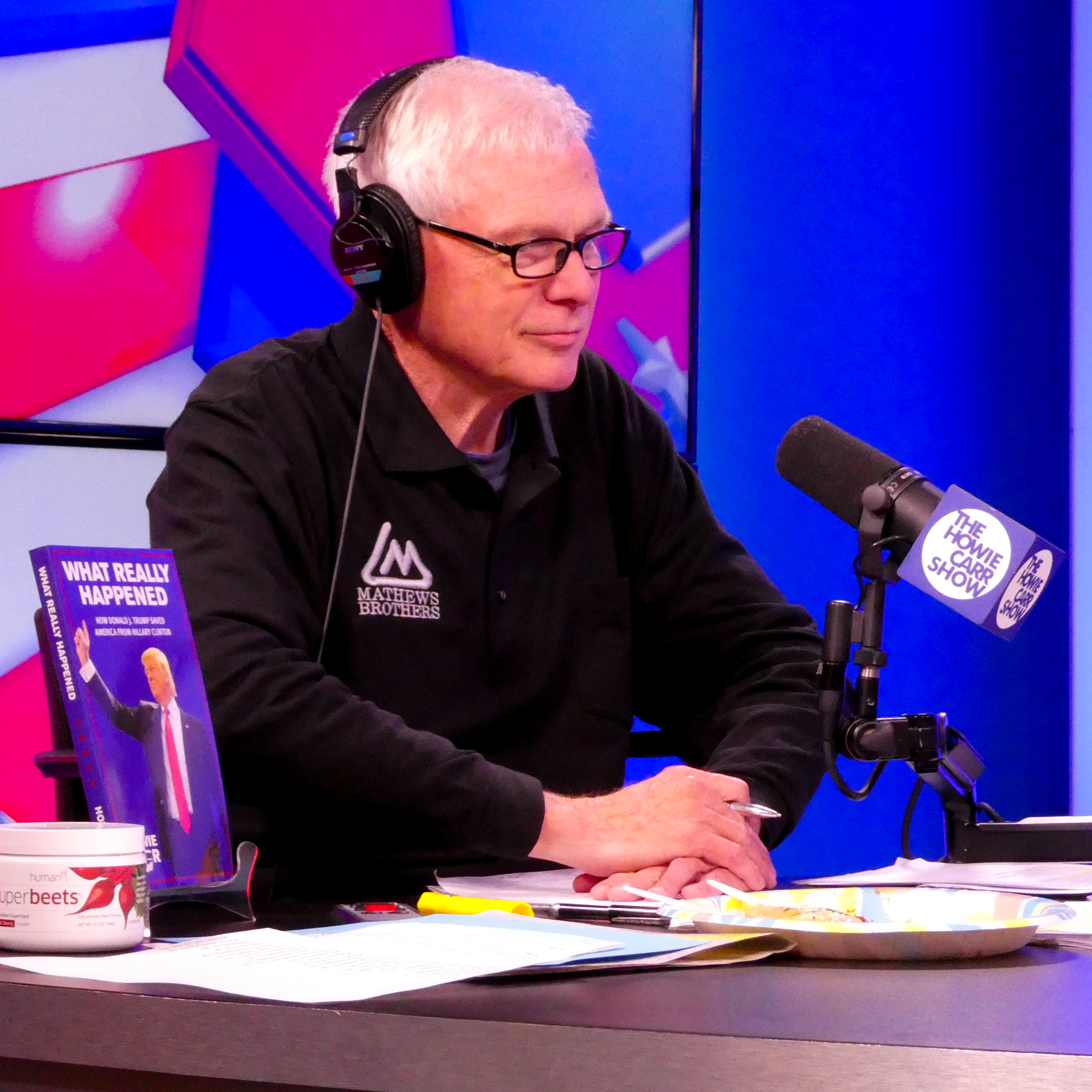
Howie Carr in January 2020

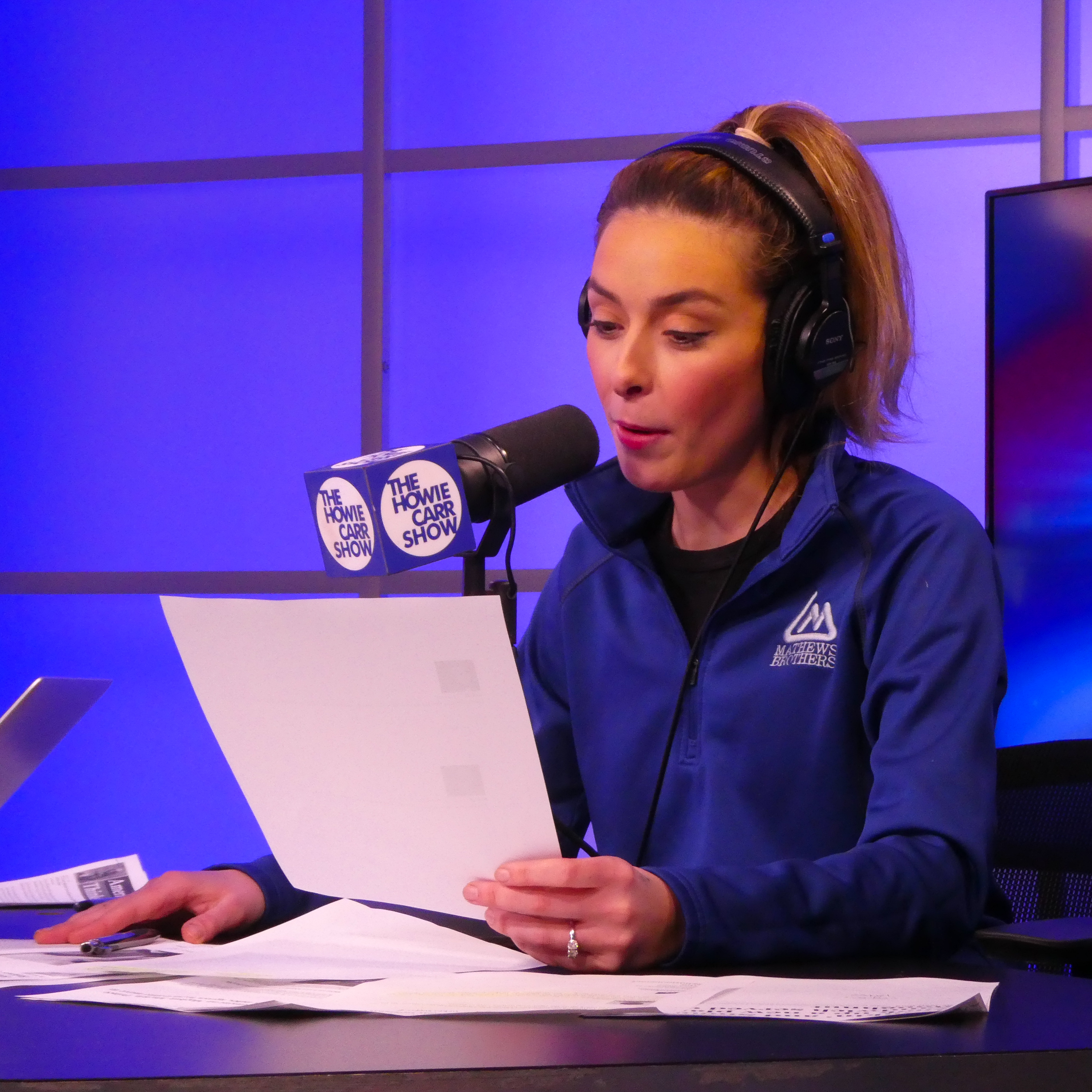
Grace Curley during a live broadcast

Taylor Cormier is the executive producer of the show. On November 17, 2020, it was announced that former co-executive producer Grace Curley would be starting her own show on WRKO in Boston from noon to three on weekdays. Curley, however, continues doing regular features, such as "Hate Mail Mondays," on Carr's show.

The frequently referenced "Mail Room Manager" is Howie's wife, Kathy.

Boston movie host Dana Hersey records the show's voice-overs and promotions.

Formerly, Giles Threadgold was a sports announcer and sidekick.

South shore resident Dave Cullinane was once part of the Howie Carr Show team but was let go due to lack of attending media "avails" as well as claims that he, Cullinane, had made contributions ("did help in some capacity") to the show that proved to be non-existent.

== Show format ==
The show is based on a monologue heavy on sarcasm and irony, with occasional interaction with producers, with which to encourage live caller participation. Invited guests are sometimes featured. Prior to the 2011 capture of Whitey Bulger, Carr's most common theme, as at the Boston Herald, was organized crime and elected officials, which he described in similar terms. After Bulger's incarceration, Carr's focus became more political in nature. He sometimes focuses on notorious local malapropisms, such as that of former city councillor Frederick C. Langone in referring to fresh vegetables not as crudités but "CRUD-ites."

Commercial breaks occur, on average, every fifteen minutes; news reports every thirty minutes in five-minute durations.

=== Features ===
==== Chump Line ====
Listeners can call Carr's voice mail service, the "Chump Line". Selected messages are played shortly after the start of the show's third hour.

The feature ends with a message, as might be heard on an answering machine: "Thank you for calling Howie Carr -- you chump!" The voice is that of a former summer intern named Trish; when originally recorded, Carr explained away the fact that she, not being a member of the AFTRA guild, was not permitted to work on-air.

House Of Pain - "On Point" is the song played in the background.

==== Hate Mail Monday ====
On Mondays, Curley reads a selection of the "hate mail" the show has received in the prior week, with Carr and Cormier offering their ironic and sarcastic comments.

==== Listener contests ====
Carr occasionally dedicates segments or entire hours to contests for listeners to win prizes. The prizes are sometimes gift certificates from sponsors, but may be T-shirts or other materials promoting a book Carr has written, or other promotional gifts that WRKO has acquired. Carr sometimes sarcastically overstates the desirability of the prizes.

==== Police Blotter Fax Fridays ====
Each Friday, Curley reads police reports that listeners have submitted via fax or e-mail, and the show awards prizes for the two funniest entries. A favorite topic is crimes or incidents involving naked men or women, accompanied by a clip from Randy Newman's song "Naked Man".

==== Death Pool ====
Video of Howie Carr introducing the Death Pool segment of his radio show

The celebrity death pool is a discontinued contest where Howie asked listeners to guess the next famous person likely to die. Elderly actors, politicians and musicians were the most popular choices, but nobody was off limits. A celebrity death among the listener choices resulted in the declaration of a winner, who would receive various prizes from Howie and/or his sponsors. Whenever someone won the "death pool", Carr would dedicate an entire hour to a new pool, in which callers could again select a person in the public eye who would be the next to die and a new list would be compiled. The contest was discontinued due to technical limitations of the station's phones and computers.

== Catchphrases ==
Carr often reads clips of current news, usually accompanied by his own sarcastic opinion. For example, news of crime involving rap or hip-hop artists, professional athletes, or politicians is often preceded by, "Try not to let the following news destroy your faith in the integrity of" the respective community. Stories about crime involving a vehicle or an unusual weapon elicit the line, "How many more must die, Mr. Speaker? How many more?"—a satire of legislators who stress the need to act before the next casualty.

"Do you know who I am?" Often deployed with reference to members of the Kennedy family or other politically connected individuals demanding favors or special treatment from law enforcement or other authorities after being caught committing an illegal or immoral act.

Untimely deaths are treated with zeal with clichés or recurring newspaper headlines ("standing heads"): The victim "was turning his life around," or his mother said he was on the verge of becoming a rap artist. If a vehicle was involved, Carr may ask whether "alcohol was a factor," as though composing a police report. That a person "won't be down for breakfast" is a favorite euphemism for death.

Another frequent topic is the phenomenon of illegal aliens, especially when they receive preferential treatment. Carr's general support for the Republican Party allowed an exception for George W. Bush's guest worker proposal. When Bush explained that aliens "do the jobs that Americans won't do," Carr began mocking Bush by appending to stories about crimes committed by illegal aliens a comment that "they are only here to commit the crimes Americans can't be bothered committing." Carr often comments about proposals to regularize illegal aliens, such as with the DREAM Act, by stating, "I don't want any special favors; just treat me like an illegal alien." Carr sarcastically uses common euphemisms for illegal aliens, such as "temporary guest worker" or "undocumented American."

Carr uses recurring slogans to give a cynical view of life in general:

- "No good deed goes unpunished" refers to the apparent futility of doing good works.
- "Never write if you can speak; never speak if you can nod; never nod if you can wink," attributed to Massachusetts political boss Martin Lomasney, is used when a politician damages his own career with notorious disclosures.
- "Nothing is on the level. Everything is a deal. No deal is too small" are Carr's "three rules" regarding lawmaking in Massachusetts. His corresponding theory on the state's judiciary is a quotation of Lenny Bruce: "In the Halls of Justice, the only justice is in the halls."

Carr uses irony, such as the line, "I'm shocked. Shocked!" (from the movie Casablanca) to describe something totally predictable; or that a politically guided personnel appointment was made "after a nationwide search." When persuading someone, as with Honest Howie's Carbon Credits, he often says, "You can trust me: I'm not like the others." When a caller delivers a rhetorical blow, Carr's signature retort is, after Red Buttons, "I didn't come here to be made sport of." When current events induce him to gloat, he always precedes it with, "My heart feels like an alligator," a line from Hunter S. Thompson's book Fear and Loathing in Las Vegas.

=== The voice-changer ===
Callers wishing to report unsavory or embarrassing details about themselves or others can request the "voice changer." Carr introduces "the Witness Protection Program of The Howie Carr Show," adding, "Now no one will know your identity." The "voice changer" is actually a 1950s sci-fi sound effect that actually does nothing to obscure the caller's voice.

== Affiliates ==
=== Connecticut ===
- WPOP 1410 AM/100.9 FM: Hartford

=== Massachusetts ===
- WRKO 680 AM–Boston
- WXTK 95.1 FM–West Yarmouth/Hyannis
- WCRN 830 AM–Worcester
- WHYN 560 AM–Springfield
- WBSM 1420 AM–New Bedford
- WPKZ 1280AM/105.3 FM–Fitchburg

=== Maine ===
- WGAN 560 AM/98.5 FM–Portland
- WVOM-FM 103.9 FM–Bangor
- WVQM 101.3 FM–Augusta

=== New Hampshire ===
- WTPL 107.7 FM: Hillsborough/Concord
- WNTK-FM 99.7 FM: New London
- WUVR 1490 AM/98.9 FM: Lebanon
- WKBK 1290 AM/107.5 FM: Keene
- WFEA 1370 AM/99.9 FM: Manchester
- WTSN 1270 AM/98.1 FM: Dover
- WEMJ 1490AM/107.3 FM: Laconia

=== Vermont ===
- WVMT 620 AM: Burlington
