= Nedra Pickler =

American journalist (born 1975)

Nedra J. Pickler
- Born: October 13, 1975 (age 50); Flint, Michigan, U.S.
- Education: Michigan State University
- Occupations: Managing Director, Glover Park Group
- Spouse: Eric Conner

Nedra J. Pickler (born October 13, 1975) is an American national political journalist formerly employed by the Associated Press. She resigned from the AP in 2015 to work as a managing director at The Glover Park Group, which later merged with two other firms to become Finsbury Glover Hering.

== Background ==
Pickler was born in Flint, Michigan to Donald and Marcy Pickler. She grew up in Rector, Arkansas, and later moved to Burton, Michigan, where she attended Bentley High School. In 1998, she graduated from Michigan State University with a degree in journalism.

== Career ==
Pickler was hired by the Detroit offices of the Associated Press in 1998 shortly after graduating from Michigan State University. In March 2000, she transferred from the Lansing bureau to the Washington, D.C. bureau where she won the annual John L. Dougherty Award for her work covering the Firestone and Ford tire controversy.

AP promoted Pickler to cover national political issues in December 2002. She was the lead reporter covering the Democratic Party candidates in the 2004 United States Presidential Election. Pickler was criticized by liberal bloggers for her critical coverage, which they called "Nit Picklering," although candidate Howard Dean praised her in his book as one of a few "outstanding journalists" in a chapter criticizing media coverage of his candidacy overall.

After that election, Pickler worked as a White House correspondent until September 2006, leaving to cover national politics, including the 2008 United States Presidential Election. President Bush bid her farewell personally, saying: "Nedra, baby, I’m gonna miss you. I’m sad you’re leaving."

In January 2007, she wrote an article investigating Senator Barack Obama's childhood education in Indonesia. Based on interviews with some of Obama's childhood friends and teachers, she reported that, contrary to some rumors reported from Insight on the News then in circulation in Fox News and The New York Times, Obama had been educated in Roman Catholic and public schools.

On March 27, 2007, Pickler wrote that Democratic presidential candidate Obama (who had declared his candidacy February 10) had "delivered no policy speeches and provided few details about how he would lead the country" in his campaign up to that point. In his 2020 autobiography, Obama cited the "painful headline Is Obama All Style and Little Substance?" as the result of his head being "crammed with too many facts and too few answers" at that point in the campaign. University of Texas at Austin head football coach Mack Brown once scolded Pickler when she tried to ask Obama a question during a football stadium tour.

At a press conference after he won the 2008 election, Obama called on Pickler to pose the first question to him as president-elect. She returned to the White House to cover his presidency before resigning from the AP in 2015 to work as a managing director at The Glover Park Group.
