= State Elementary School Menteng 01 =

SDN Menteng 01
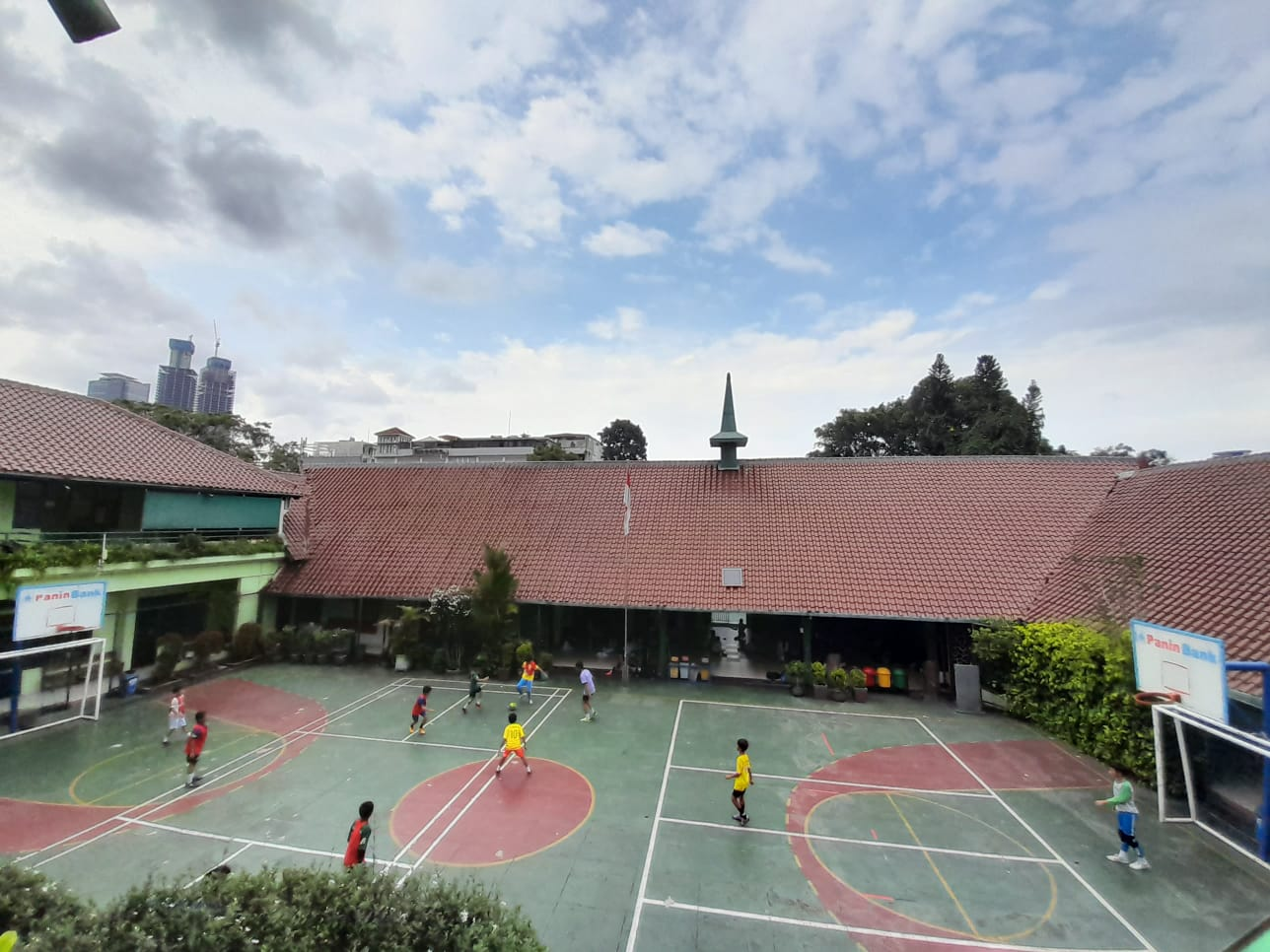

Location
- Menteng, Jakarta; Indonesia; 6°11′55″S 106°49′44″E

Information
- Type: Public
- Established: 1934
- Principal Vice Principal Deputy Headmaster: Irawan, S.Pd, M.M; Nurtiana manuhuruk Noviani Ekawati
- Enrollment: 478
- Website: www.sdnmenteng01.sch.id

State Elementary School Menteng 01 (Indonesian: Sekolah Dasar Negeri Menteng 01), also known as SDN Besuki or the Besuki school, is an Indonesian public school in Menteng, Jakarta. Former United States President Barack Obama attended the school for one and a half years when he was growing up in Indonesia.

== History ==
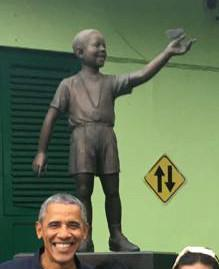
A statue of Barack Obama as a child was installed at the school in 2010

The school was founded in 1934 as Carpentier Alting Stichting Nassau School (CAS) by the Dutch colonial administration and was reserved for Dutch children and children of the Indonesian nobility. The Indonesian government took over administration of the school in 1962, and has since been run by the Raden Saleh Foundation.

Notable former students include the children of Bambang Trihatmodjo, son of former president Suharto, the grandchildren of former vice presidents Hamzah Haz and Try Sutrisno, as well as the Dutch author Tonke Dragt. In 1970–71, US President Barack Obama attended the school for one and a half years. Obama's announcement of his candidacy for United States president in January, 2007 drew worldwide media attention to the school, with many media outlets sending reporters there, including The Chicago Tribune, NBC, and the BBC. Nedra Pickler of the Associated Press reported: "Those tied to the school say they are proud to have had a student like Obama, and hope that, if he is elected president, his ties to Indonesia will broaden his world perspective and his views on religion."

In 2010, a statue of Barack Obama as a child was installed at the school.
