= American Network (United States) =

Proposed United States commercial FM radio network, 1941–1944

The American Network (1941–1944) was a United States commercial radio network. It was envisioned as a nationwide programming source for FM radio stations, and there were also plans to operate its own FM stations in major markets. However, the network was unsuccessful in becoming the licensee of any stations, and, after limited development and with an uncertain future, it was dissolved in 1944. (This network is unrelated to the later American Broadcasting Company (ABC); however, ABC's founder, Edward Noble, acquired the "American" branding from the American Network before launching the ABC radio network).

== History ==
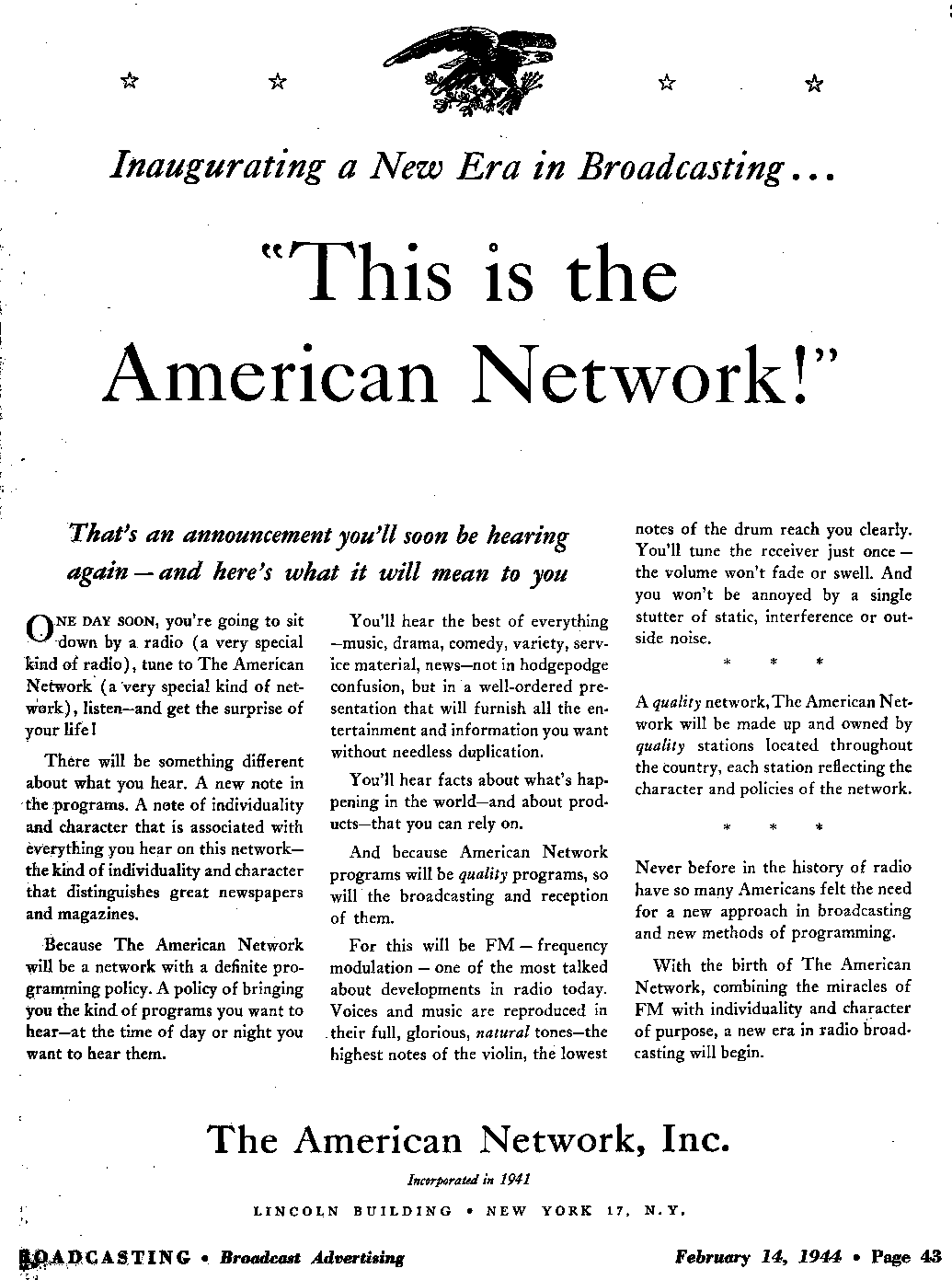
A February 1944 advertisement described the network as "Inaugurating a New Era in Broadcasting". However, it was dissolved before the end of the year.

In May 1940, the Federal Communications Commission (FCC) announced the establishment, effective January 1, 1941, of an FM radio band operating on 40 channels spanning 42–50 MHz. The American Network was incorporated in April 1941, in order to provide programming to the newly established FM stations. Start-up costs were financed by $500 contributions provided by "23 individuals and organizations".

An initial directors meeting was held on April 22 at the Hotel Ambassador in New York City. John Shepard III, president of the Yankee Network, was elected president of the new network. Originally consisting of a small number of stations located in the northeast, it expanded to 6 stations with the addition of W45D in Detroit and W45CM in Columbus, Ohio.

The first company to sign a sponsorship contract was the Socony-Vacuum Oil Company. The network's slow expansion during 1941 included W47NV in Nashville, Tennessee. In mid-1941, an unsuccessful application was made to establish a New York City station, as part of a proposed 40 market national network. As of March 1942, it was announced that the network had signed a contract for world news broadcasts by Frazier Hunt, and the network now consisted of 8 stations. An optimistic review of the post-war future of FM broadcasting showcased W41MM, transmitting from atop a western North Carolina mountain, as "the lofty affiliate of The American Network".

The United States had entered World War II in December 1941, and the following May, it was announced that the network would curtail operations for the duration of the conflict. It was announced that, beginning in December 1942, the network would participate in producing a series of programs, originating at W41NY in New York City, that would be picked up and rebroadcast by a regional collection of low-powered AM college "gaspipe" (carrier current) stations.

In early 1944, the network announced plans to reopen an office in New York City, "proposing to establish an FM network as soon as war restrictions are lifted". Network president Shepard was quoted as saying "We believe that a radio network can have as distinct a personality as a great newspaper or magazine. The American Network will be a Network with a definite programming policy. A policy of bringing listeners the kind of programming they want to hear—at the time when they want to hear them". However, by a unanimous vote of the board of directors, the American Network was dissolved the following August, after concluding that "With the outbreak of the war, resulting in a halt on all manufacture of FM sets and transmitters, and the FM picture changing rapidly since, the stockholders found the original corporate structure inadequate to support the augmented service an independent postwar FM network will require."

The recently reorganized "Blue Network" paid $10,000 in order to gain rights to the use of "American" for its renaming as the American Broadcasting Company (ABC).
