= WGYN =

Radio station in New York City (1941–1950)

- New York City, New York; United States
- Frequency: 97.9 MHz

Ownership
- Owner: WGYN, Inc.

History
- First air date: December 1941
- Last air date: May 1950
- Former call signs: W47NY (1941–1943)
- Former frequencies: 44.7 MHz (1941–1946); 96.1 MHz (1946–1947)

Technical information
- Transmitter coordinates: 40°42′23″N 74°00′27″W

WGYN was a commercial radio station licensed to New York City, New York, United States, that operated from December 1941 to May 1950. One of the earliest FM stations in operation in the United States, it broadcast at 44.7 MHz before a realignment of the FM band by the Federal Communications Commission placed it at 96.1 MHz, then at 97.9 MHz. Built by the Muzak Corporation, WGYN's studios and transmitter were located at the Cities Service Building at 70 Pine Street.

== History ==
The Muzak Corporation built and signed on W47NY, operating at 44.7 MHz, in December 1941. The station aired an entirely musical format with news flashes from United Press. Muzak also obtained a permit to operate experimentally on 117.65 MHz to provide a fee-based service of background music, similar to its wire-delivered offering. As with all of the first FM call signs, the designation represented the location (New York City) and its position on the dial in the FM band of the time, at 44.7 megahertz. It was announced that beginning in December 1942, W47NY would originate programs aired over other FM stations in the northeastern United States, known together as the "American Network", in addition to a collection of low-powered AM "gaspipe" (carrier current) stations affiliated with the Intercollegiate Broadcasting System.

When the FCC changed the alphanumeric call signs of early commercial FM stations to more typical four-letter designations in October 1943, W47NY became WGYN.

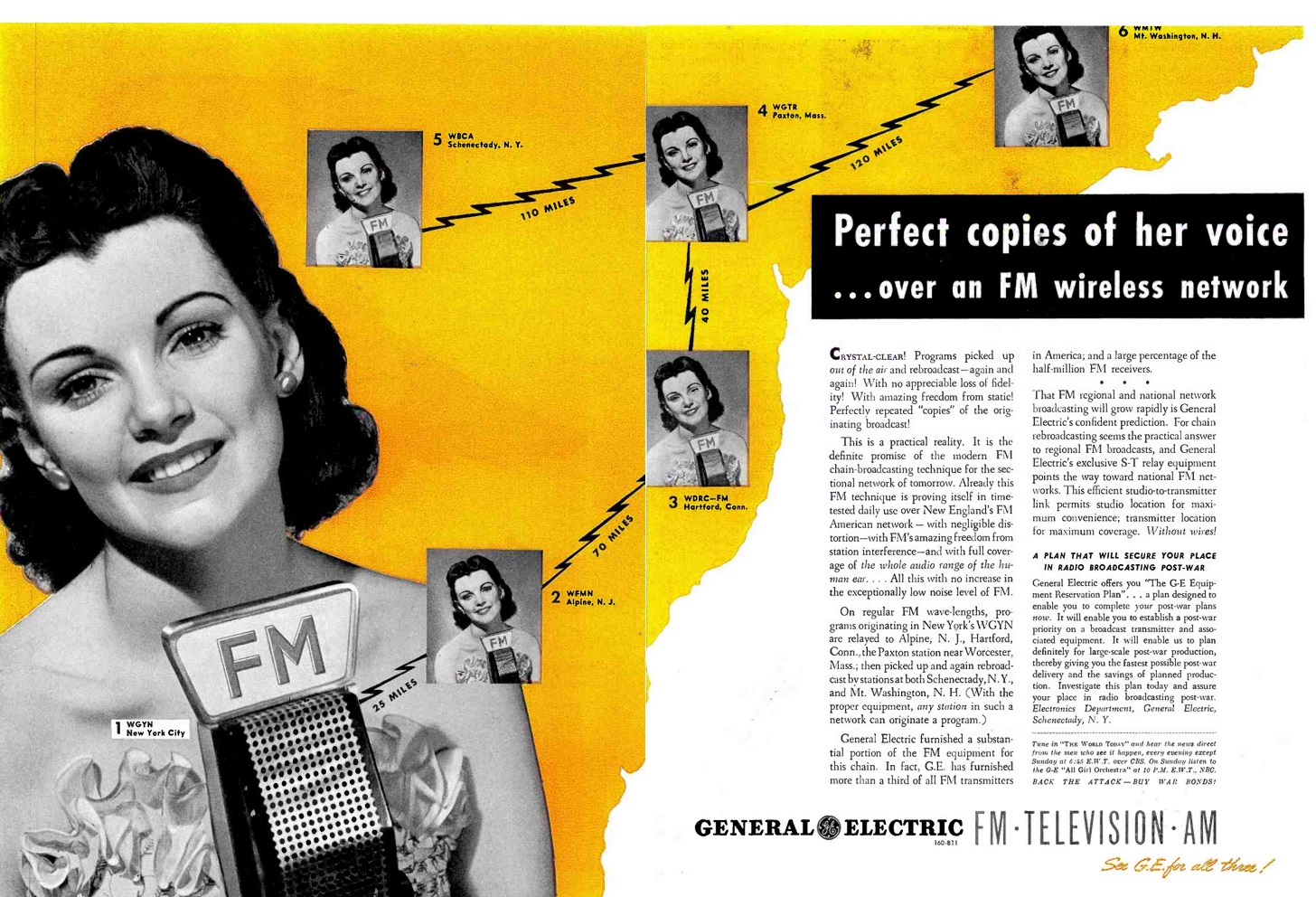
1943 General Electric advertisement, about a WGYN broadcast relayed over-the-air to five additional FM stations. The listed stations are: 1. WGYN (New York City), 2. WFMN (Alpine, New Jersey), 3. WDRC-FM (Hartford, Connecticut), 4. WGTR (Paxton, Massachusetts), 5. WBCA (Schenectady, New York), and 6. WMTW (Mount Washington, New Hampshire). Despite the ad's optimistic tone, all except WDRC-FM were deleted by 1954.

In 1945, WGYN's director, Palmer K. Leberman, was a captain in the Navy, president of Seattle radio station KRSC, and applicant for a New York television station.

WGYN was assigned 96.1 MHz as part of the move of the FM band up to 88–108 MHz. It was the first station in New York to begin test transmissions in the new band. Operating in the early days of FM, WGYN was blamed for—and found to not be the source of—interference to instrument landing system equipment on aircraft at LaGuardia Airport. Another reallocation of FM—adopting 800 kHz channel spacing—saw WGYN move to its final dial position of 97.9 in 1947.

In 1947, Muzak divested itself of WGYN and sold its stake to the other investors in the station, Charles E. Merrill and Leberman's Radio Sales Corporation. WGYN went off the air in May 1950 due to unprofitable operations over its entire existence: Leberman described its financial situation as "pouring good money in the soup". After ceasing operations, the Multiplex Development Corporation used the WGYN facilities in its tests of subcarrier multiplexing over FM stations, using the experimental call sign of KE2XKH.
