= WNAC =

WNAC may refer to:

- WNAC-TV, a television station (channel 12 digital/PSIP 64) licensed to Providence, Rhode Island, United States
- WNAC-TV (Boston), a television station (channel 7) formerly licensed to Boston, Massachusetts, United States, which operated from June 1948 to May 1982
- WRKO, a radio station (680 AM) licensed to Boston, Massachusetts, United States, which formerly used the call sign WNAC
- WBIX, a radio station (1260 AM) licensed to Boston, Massachusetts, United States, which formerly used the call sign WNAC
- WBZ-FM, a radio station (98.5 FM) licensed to Boston, Massachusetts, United States, which formerly used the call sign WNAC-FM
