= John Shepard III =

American radio executive (1886–1950)

John Shepherd III
- 1936 Yankee Network Publicity Photo of John Shepard III
- Born: March 19, 1886; Boston, Massachusetts
- Died: May 11, 1950 (aged 64); Brookline, Massachusetts
- Occupations: Retail store owner, radio station executive
- Known for: Radio pioneer, founder of the Yankee Network
- Parent(s): John Shepard Jr. and Flora Martin Shepard

John Shepard III (March 19, 1886 – May 11, 1950) was an American radio executive and merchant. Among his many achievements, he was one of the original board members of the National Association of Broadcasters, having been elected the group's first vice president in 1923. Shepard co-founded a New England radio network, known as the Yankee Network, along with his brother Robert, in 1929–1930. Shepard was also an early proponent of frequency modulation or FM broadcasting: he established the first FM network, when he linked his station in Massachusetts with one in New Hampshire in early 1941. He also was an early experimenter with home shopping, creating perhaps the first all-female radio station, WASN, in early 1927; the station broadcast some music, but mostly focused on shopping news and information about merchandise that listeners could purchase. Additionally, he created a local news network to serve New England, the Yankee News Service, and was instrumental in getting radio journalists the same credentials as print journalists.

== Early life ==
John Shepard III was born in Boston on March 19, 1886; his father's name was John Jr. and his mother's name was Flora. John III also had a brother Robert, who was born in 1891. A third brother, Edward, was born in 1889, but he died suddenly at age twenty-one, in 1910. Along with his family, John III spent his early years in Providence before returning to greater Boston, where his family owned a home in Brookline. He graduated from Brookline High School. John Shepard and his brother Robert were born into a family of merchants. Their grandfather, John Shepard Senior and business partner Henry Norwell founded Shepard-Norwell, a Boston dry goods and retail store, in 1865. That business later expanded to include a store in Providence, and the two companies became known collectively as the Shepard Stores in 1911. John Shepard III's father, John Shepard Junior, assumed operations that year, when John Sr. retired. By that time, the Shepard Store in Boston had become one of Boston's most popular department stores. The large building, located at 30 Winter Street, occupied most of the city block created by Winter Street and Winter Place.

John Shepard III tried unsuccessfully to enroll at the U.S. Naval Academy, but was rejected due to poor eyesight. Rather than try to attend a different college, he chose to enter the retail trade of his father and grandfather. In 1912, John Shepard III married Mabel E. Fletcher of Providence, with whom he had three daughters. By 1917, John III had worked his way up to a department manager at the Shepard Stores, becoming the third generation to go into management there. Meanwhile, his brother, Robert, became the manager of the Shepard Store in Providence.

== Early radio career ==
In 1920 and 1921, people were still building their own radio sets and only a few commercial stations were on the air. That changed in 1922, as radio developing into the latest craze and new stations proliferated. By this time, John Shepard III was the general manager of the Shepard Stores. Radio was becoming an essential part of daily life, and John Shepard III decided the Shepard Stores needed a radio department. It was installed on the fourth floor of the Boston store; personnel demonstrated radio equipment, sold ready-made sets, and let customers listen to music concerts from other stations. But Shepard wanted to do more than just sell radios; he wanted to have a station of his own. He applied for a license, and on July 31, 1922, the new radio station gave its first broadcast. For its first several months, it was only known as the "Shepard Radio Station"; it was not until mid-September that the call letters "WNAC" came into use. The Shepard station was typical of radio stations of the early 1920s: it featured a combination of music played by dance orchestras, performances by local vocalists, religious services, news headlines, and educational talks. In fact, WNAC was the first greater Boston radio station to broadcast a live church service, from the Cathedral Church of St. Paul. In addition, in 1924, Shepard contracted with Rabbi Harry Levi of Temple Israel in Boston to broadcast synagogue services, perhaps the first time in greater Boston that Jewish services were made available to a wider audience. Five years later, Shepard arranged to have regular Sunday broadcasts by Catholic priest Father Michael J. Ahern, a program that came to be known as the "Catholic Truth Period." WNAC also developed a program especially for housewives, the WNAC Women's Club. It became one of the station's most popular features.

During WNAC's first several years, John Shepard III was not only managing the Shepard Store and selling radio sets; by early 1923, he was taking an occasional turn as one of the announcers, using his initials, JS. Meanwhile, as radio continued to grow in popularity, the Shepard Stores had to expand their radio department, as well as expanding the number of hours the station broadcast. By the mid-1920s John Shepard III and his brother Robert, who managed the Providence Shepard Store and also operated station WEAN, began experimenting with linking their two stations by telephone land lines in order to share and exchange programming. As far back as January 1923, Shepard's WNAC had already done a brief experiment with WEAF in New York, in which the two stations were linked for five minutes, proving that such a linkage could be achieved. Then, on December 24, 1925, both WNAC and WEAN aired a program of Christmas carols, sung by several choirs. The two stations also relayed individual programs, with a Providence broadcast being sent to Boston, or vice versa. These experiments were well received by the audience, and by the late 1920s, they became a regular part of the broadcasting schedule, ultimately leading to the creation of the Yankee Network.

In May 1925, Shepard expanded further, acquiring a second Boston station, WNAB. In late January 1927, that station became WASN (Air Shopping News), an early experiment with home shopping by radio. The experiment was unsuccessful, however. By July 1927, the station had become known as WBIS. Meanwhile, by April 1926, John Shepard III began providing Boston's baseball fans with regular broadcasts of home games: Boston Traveler sportswriter Gus Rooney aired the play-by-play of a Boston Red Sox game, and subsequently announced a Boston Braves home game. Later that year, Rooney was replaced at the microphone by sportswriter Fred Hoey.

== Later radio career ==
John Shepard III and his brother Robert founded the Yankee Network in a period of time from February 1929 to July 1930. Its purpose was to give New England a radio network that could offer local news, sports, and music. Its first affiliates, in addition to station WNAC in Boston and WEAN in Providence, were WNBH in New Bedford, WLBZ in Bangor, Maine, and WORC in Worcester. Also in the chain of stations was WLEX, then in Lexington, Massachusetts. Shepard ultimately purchased WLEX and moved it to Boston in 1931, under the call letters WAAB. Meanwhile, the Yankee Network continued to gain new affiliates, as WDRC in Hartford, Connecticut, soon joined, as did WICC in Bridgeport. Throughout the Yankee Network's thirty-seven year history, WNAC remained the flagship station. At the height of its popularity, the network had affiliates in Massachusetts (Fall River, Lowell–Lawrence, New Bedford, Springfield), Connecticut (Bridgeport, Hartford, Waterbury), Rhode Island (Providence), New Hampshire (Manchester), and Maine (Bangor, Portland).

In mid-1930, as a result of his success with broadcasting, Shepard moved his radio stations out of the Boston Shepard Store, and into larger and more modern studios at the Hotel Buckminster in what is today called Kenmore Square. The new facilities were also needed because of the growth of the Yankee Network; the Buckminster studios were more spacious, and thus more suitable for live broadcasts of radio dramas, or performances from big-band orchestras. In early 1934, Shepard also inaugurated the Yankee News Service, which used the slogan "News While It Is News", a reference to how radio could deliver the news more quickly than newspapers. Shepard hired a former newspaper reporter named Richard Grant as his news director, and then led the effort for radio reporters to be given press credentials the way print reporters were. Broadcasting magazine praised Shepard as an innovator who persuaded advertisers to support radio and successfully gained cooperation from wire services like the Associated Press, which has previously snubbed radio in favor of print.

In 1936, Shepard began a second network, which he called the Colonial Network. Its flagship station was WAAB. By now, Shepard's two networks had affiliated radio stations in every major city in New England. As one Boston Herald columnist observed, John Shepard III, who had gotten involved with radio as a hobby back in 1922, was now a dominant force in regional broadcasting.

Shepard's next accomplishment was his involvement with the then-new technology of frequency modulation (FM) broadcasting, pioneered by inventor Edwin Howard Armstrong. The Yankee Network's chief engineer, Paul DeMars, had heard a demonstration of Armstrong's innovation, and encouraged Shepard to invest in it. Shepard agreed, pledging to spend the money necessary to build an FM broadcasting station that would serve greater Boston. Shepard saw FM as the solution to a common complaint of AM radio listeners: the signal often faded out unexpected, or noise from atmospheric interference made programs unlistenable. Frequency modulation broadcasting promised programs with excellent reception, that would also be static-free. In mid-1939, Paul DeMars arranged a series of local demonstrations in Boston so that the press and the public could hear the benefits of Armstrong's invention. On July 24, 1939, Shepard's new FM station, W1XOJ went on the air. Its transmitter was in Paxton, Massachusetts, not far from Worcester, atop Asnebumskit Hill. According to the Boston Post, it cost John Shepard III a quarter of a million dollars to build the new radio station. Shepard understood that it might take a while for the public to be won over to FM, but by now, he believed in it, and was certain it was just a matter of time before FM became popular. As further proof of his faith in FM, Shepard invested in a second FM station, to be built in New Hampshire, with the transmitter atop Mount Washington. The new station, W1XER, went on the air in December 1940, and by January 1941, it was linked with Shepard's greater Boston FM, creating the first FM network.

== Remainder of his life ==
In late December 1937, Bostonians were surprised to learn the Boston Shepard Store was closing, after being in business for seventy-two years. John Shepard Jr. explained that he was too old to run it, and noted that his son John III was mainly involved with his radio properties. The Providence Shepard store remained open, with Robert continuing to operate it. John III was in fact entirely focused on broadcasting: in addition to running the Yankee and Colonial Networks, he had become involved with a new national network, the Mutual Broadcasting System, and was on its board of directors. Then, in 1942, as a result of a Federal Communications Commission (FCC) ruling about how many stations one owner could have in the same city, Shepard had to relocate WAAB, from Boston to Worcester, Massachusetts. This eventually resulted in the end of the Colonial Network; WNAC remained in Boston as the flagship of the Yankee Network, which continued on; some of the former Colonial affiliates joined the Yankee Network instead.

In March 1942, Shepard opened six new, state-of-the-art studios next door to the Buckminster Hotel; among the features of the new studios were facilities designed to be used exclusively for FM broadcasts. But then, in mid-December 1942, Shepard suddenly announced he had sold the Yankee Network to the General Tire and Rubber Company of Akron, Ohio; the move was surprising to most members of the broadcasting community. Under the agreement he negotiated, Shepard stayed on as president and general manager of the Yankee Network and its twenty-one affiliated stations for five years. Meanwhile, in 1948, John Shepard Jr. died in Palm Beach, Florida after a long illness, at age 91. By this time, John Shepard III was also in poor health. He retired from broadcasting in early 1949, and died in mid-June 1950 from heart disease; he was 64.
