= Yankee Network =

Former regional radio network in New England

- Type: Radio network
- Broadcast area: New England
- Headquarters: Boston, Massachusetts

Ownership
- Parent: Shepard Stores (1925–1942); General Tire (1942–1967)
- Key people: John Shepard III; Robert Shepard

History
- Launch date: Varied dates; test transmissions began in the mid-1920s, network establishment took place between 1929 and 1930
- Closed: February 26, 1967; 59 years ago

Coverage
- Availability: regional
- Stations: 27 (peak)

The Yankee Network was an American radio network, based in Boston, Massachusetts, with affiliate radio stations throughout New England. At the height of its influence, the Yankee Network had as many as 24 affiliated radio stations. The network was co-founded by John Shepard III and his brother Robert, in 1929–1930. The beginnings of what became the Yankee Network occurred in the mid-1920s, when John Shepard's Boston station WNAC linked by telephone land lines with Robert Shepard's station in Providence, Rhode Island, WEAN, so that the two stations could share or exchange programming. Those two stations became the first two Yankee Network stations. In 1930, they were joined by the first affiliated radio stations, including WLBZ in Bangor, Maine; WORC in Worcester, Massachusetts; WNBH in New Bedford, Massachusetts; and WICC in Bridgeport, Connecticut. During the 1930s, the network became known for developing its own local and regional news bureau, the Yankee News Service. The Yankee Network and the Yankee News Service operated until February 1967.

== History ==
=== Early years ===
The main benefit of joining the Yankee Network was that it offered its affiliates as much as 17 hours of daily programming. Yankee affiliates were provided with access to some of the best-known Boston vocalists and orchestras, as well as nationally-known entertainers who were appearing in Boston or Providence. For example, a concert by opera star Mary Garden was broadcast, as was a concert by the Providence Symphony Orchestra. Dance music was often played by bandleader Joe Rines and his orchestra, or by other popular bandleaders like Dok Eisenbourg. The Yankee Network also had its own 22-piece orchestra, led by Charles R. Hector. Among other popular entertainers heard on the Yankee Network in the early 1930s were pianist, songwriter and bandleader Gus Arnheim, and local favorites "Hum and Strum." The Yankee Network broadcast radio plays, featuring its own drama troupe, made up of members of the WNAC staff, led by announcer Ben Hadfield. In addition to religious services and educational talks, there were also cultural programs, including excerpts from "The Green Pastures," a play starring black actor Richard B. Harrison; and talks by the region's mayors, governors, and other political leaders. For sports fans, they could hear Boston Braves and Boston Red Sox baseball games, announced by Fred Hoey. College football, broadcast live from various schools in the region, was also a popular feature. In addition to providing local and regional programming, the Yankee Network was also affiliated with the Columbia Broadcasting System (later known as CBS), which provided national programs to complement Yankee's New England focus.

By 1931, the network was also offering regular news broadcasts, on the half-hour, making use of reporting by some of Boston's newspapers. But by 1933, the relationship between print and radio had become contentious, with newspapers no longer willing to provide news to radio stations. The so-called "Press-Radio Agreement" limited the number of newscasts radio stations could broadcast to only two a day, and listeners were very upset that they could no longer hear regular news on the air. In early March 1934, John Shepard III organized his own news bureau, the Yankee News Service, to provide his affiliates with regular local and regional news reports. It replaced the newscasts previously provided by reporters from the Boston Herald-Traveler, Boston American, and Boston Daily Record. Shepard hired Richard D. Grant, a former print journalist from the Boston Evening Transcript, to be in charge of the news broadcasts. Editor in chief was Leland Bickford, who co-wrote a book in 1935 about the first year of the Yankee News Service. The Yankee News Service used the slogan "News while it IS News," intended as a jab at the newspapers, which disseminated news at a slower pace than radio. That was also the title of the book about the creation of the news service. In addition, on February 20, 1938, the Yankee Network debuted its own radio weather service, to provide up-to-date weather information to affiliates. The first chief meteorologist of the Yankee Network Weather Service was Salvatore Pagliuca, who had formerly worked at the Blue Hills Observatory and the Mount Washington Observatory.

=== Expansion ===
Throughout the early-to-mid 1930s, the Yankee Network continued to expand, picking up affiliates in such cities as Springfield, Massachusetts; Hartford, Connecticut; and Manchester, New Hampshire. The network also received support from advertisers, who saw it as an effective way to reach an audience that extended throughout New England. In 1935, the Yankee Network centralized its executive offices and studios in a new headquarters, 21 Brookline Avenue in Boston. The move followed a $25,000 renovation of the facilities. Also included in the building were studios and offices of WNAC and WAAB, the network's Boston stations.

One area where the expansion was noticeable was in the news department, which was praised by national magazines like Variety for its coverage of state legislatures, as well as coverage of news-makers throughout New England. There was some early controversy over John Shepard's policy of inserting brief "plugs" (sponsor mentions) into the newscasts, but Shepard defended the practice as necessary in order to support the broadcasts. Gradually, as the network hired more staff and was able to cover stories more extensively, the complaints diminished. By 1939, the Yankee Network was said to be the first regional network to send a full-time reporter, Pete Tully, to Washington, D.C. to cover Congress. The Yankee Network also earned praise for its coverage of natural disasters in New England, such as in April 1936, when heavy rainstorms caused flooding in western Massachusetts, or in September 1938, when a hurricane devastated much of Southern New England. Yankee affiliate WMAS in Springfield was instrumental in keeping the public informed, broadcasting weather reports and news coverage around the clock until the storm had ended; and later, WMAS raised funds for on-going disaster relief in the region.

Despite John Shepard's affiliation of his Yankee Network stations with CBS, he still became involved in the founding of a new network, which came to be known as the Mutual Broadcasting System, and he served on its board of directors. Beginning around 1936, the Yankee Network also started to carry some Mutual programs. Meanwhile, there were some changes in Boston radio that affected the Yankee Network. CBS had begun purchasing stations, in addition to providing network programming. In early 1936, CBS purchased Boston's WEEI, making it necessary for Shepard's WNAC to affiliate with a different network, NBC's Red Network. The change officially took place in late September of that year.

In the late 1930s, Shepard had become interested in frequency modulation (later known as FM). In 1937 a plan was developed envisioning that 90% of New England could be provided with FM programs by building mountaintop stations, consisting of a 50 kilowatt transmitter on Mount Asnebumskit at Paxton, Massachusetts, plus 5 kilowatt stations on Mount Washington in New Hampshire and Mount Mansfield in Vermont. (Later plans dropped the proposed Mount Mansfield station). With the help of the inventor of FM, Major Edwin H. Armstrong, the Yankee Network inaugurated the nation's first FM radio network, beginning with an early January 1940 demonstration of an FM inter-city relay, linking Shepard's experimental FM station W1XOJ in Paxton, Massachusetts, to an FM transmitter at station W1XPW in Meriden, Connecticut (now WHCN), to Armstrong's W2XMN in Alpine, New Jersey, to the parent broadcasting system based in the studios of WEAF in New York. Shepard's FM network officially made its debut in December 1940 when W1XOJ in Paxton was permanently linked with W1XER on Mount Washington. Because of their superior audio quality, the FM stations became known for broadcasting live classical music concerts.

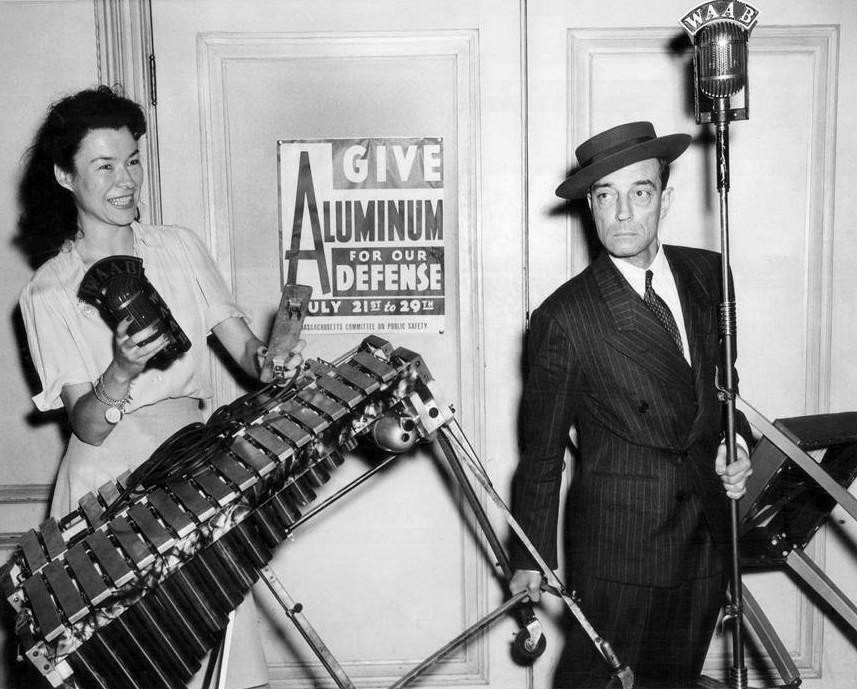
Buster Keaton and WAAB radio host Ruth Moss in an aluminum drive publicity photo for the Yankee Network, 1942.

But while John Shepard III was making plans to further expand the Yankee Network's FM properties, there was a major obstacle. The Yankee Network faced a powerful opponent—the Radio Corporation of America (RCA—the majority owner of NBC), which saw FM as a threat to its established AM radio business. RCA was also concerned that Yankee's technique of "networking" their service around New England via inexpensive, off-air FM relays instead of AT&T phone lines, would open the door to many less well-funded groups establishing competition to RCA's established network, NBC. RCA, under general manager David Sarnoff, successfully pressured the Federal Communications Commission (FCC) to move the FM radio spectrum from 42–50 MHz to 88–108 MHz in 1945. This required massive hardware retooling at all FM broadcasters. Some affiliates dropped out, forcing the Yankee Network to lease phone lines from AT&T to fill in the holes between stations. The added costs to broadcasters and the obsolescence of all FM radios at the time set back FM broadcasting for a decade or more.

Despite the setback with FM, the Yankee Network seemed to be doing well. There were a number of popular programs, including "Ruth Moss Interviews," featuring conversations with local and national celebrities; a variety show called "Yankee House Party," featuring organist Frank Cronin and the Bobby Norris Orchestra, which was also picked up by the Mutual Network; as well as various sports events, including Red Sox and Braves play-by-play, often announced by Jim Britt, who had been hired as a sportscaster by the Yankee Network in 1939. In mid-1941, it was announced that the network would soon change from its affiliation with NBC to a full-time affiliation with Mutual. In March 1942, the network debuted six new studios, including one especially equipped for FM, as well as several with better acoustics and new musical instruments for the Yankee Network's orchestras; one studio featured a custom-designed organ, said to be the largest in use at any radio station.

=== Controversies and problems ===
In 1938, a former Yankee Network employee named Lawrence J. Flynn challenged the license of Shepard's WAAB in Boston, and also lodged a complaint about WNAC. Flynn asserted that these stations were being used to air one-sided political viewpoints and broadcast attacks (including editorials) against local politicians that Shepard opposed. The FCC requested that Shepard provide details about these programs, and to appease the commission, the Yankee Network agreed to drop the editorials. But Flynn created a company called Mayflower Broadcasting and tried to get the FCC to award him WAAB's license; however, the FCC refused. Instead, in 1941, the commission made a ruling that came to be known as the Mayflower Decision which declared that radio stations, due to their public interest obligations, must remain neutral in matters of news and politics, and they were not allowed to give editorial support to any particular political position or candidate. The decision was very unpopular with broadcasters, who saw it as a form of censorship. But despite widespread dissatisfaction, the FCC did not officially reverse the Mayflower Decision until 1949.

In 1941, the FCC ruled that owners could not own more than one station in the same city. Shepard owned two Boston stations: WNAC and its sister station WAAB. To comply with the FCC's ruling, Shepard needed to move WAAB. He decided to relocate it to Worcester, a market that Yankee did not serve at that point. WAAB, which made its debut broadcast from Worcester on December 13, 1942, was now the Mutual and Yankee affiliate in central Massachusetts.

In mid-December 1942, it was suddenly announced that the Yankee Network was being sold; the news caught most people in Boston's broadcasting community by surprise, as it was not generally known that the network was for sale. The purchaser was General Tire and Rubber Company of Akron, Ohio, led by its president William O'Neil. The new owner agreed that John Shepard III would stay on at the head of the Yankee Network for the next five years.

In 1947 the network consisted of 24 AM and two FM affiliates.

In 1947, the Yankee Network's flagship station, WNAC, celebrated its 25th anniversary, but this milestone was commemorated in a very low-key manner. While Shepard continued on as head of the network, he was now in poor health; the day-to-date operation of the network was being handled by Executive Vice President and General Manager Linus Travers, a veteran of the network who had worked for Shepard since being hired in 1927 as an announcer and commercial manager. When Travers was promoted to an executive position at Mutual in September 1948, he was replaced by another long-time employee of the Yankee Network, George Steffy. In December 1948, John Shepard Jr., who had run the Shepard Department Stores and provided early financial support for his son John III's radio venture, died at age 91. John Shepard III died from heart disease in mid-June 1950, at age 64.

Meanwhile, television had come to Boston in early June 1948, when WBZ-TV debuted; the Yankee Network's TV station, WNAC-TV made its debut several weeks later, on June 21. But as the Yankee Network expanded into TV, it experienced some labor problems. In early May 1949, all of the network's eighty engineers, both from radio and television, went out on strike, to protest what were said to be steep wage cuts the ownership was asking them to take. Managers and other executives kept the stations on the air, but some remote broadcasts had to be canceled, including the scheduled telecasts of the Boston Braves home games. Also, some announcers refused to cross the picket lines, requiring management to do some of the announcing during the strike. The pay dispute, which made the national news, took sixteen days to resolve and required the help of an arbitrator. The strike finally ended after the proposed wage cuts were canceled and a new salary agreement was reached, at which time the engineers and announcers returned to work.

=== The Yankee Network's final years ===
In the early-to-mid 1950s, the Yankee Network continued doing what it had become known for: providing local news, daytime programs aimed at housewives, music from local orchestras, and live sports broadcasts. Among the most popular personalities on the Yankee Network during this time were Bill Hahn and Ruth Mugglebee, who hosted a daily homemaking and cooking show (in 1955, Bill Hahn got a different female co-host, Duncan MacDonald; news commentator and (print reporter) Bill Cunningham; and Louise Morgan, who had begun her career on radio at WNAC in 1943 and was now also seen on WNAC-TV hosting a fashion and celebrity interview program. In the summer of 1953, WNAC in Boston was able to switch to a better frequency, after Lawrence, Massachusetts, radio station WLAW (owned by the Lawrence Eagle and Tribune newspaper) decided to cease broadcasting, and its owner, Irving E. Rogers, sold the station. WLAW had been occupying 680 kHz with 50,000 watts, while WNAC had been at 1260 kHz with 5,000 watts. Thanks to the sale of WLAW, the higher-powered 680 frequency became available and WNAC moved there; the 1260 AM frequency was purchased by Victor C. Diehm, a station owner from Hazleton, Pennsylvania, and christened WVDA. After operating station WVDA in Boston, Diehm would later go on to become president of the Mutual network.

As top-40 radio became dominant on AM in the late 1950s, the Yankee Network continued to program for an audience that was now aging. In fact, at many stations, the programming content was undergoing a number of changes: for one thing, few stations had live orchestras any more. With television becoming popular, many programs previously heard only on radio moved over to TV. Even soap operas, long a staple of network programming on radio, ceased in 1960. Also during this time period, many stations stopped relying on syndicated programs from NBC, CBS, ABC, or Mutual and began to do their own programming: in Boston, for example, WBZ ended its long affiliation with NBC to program its own music, using live and local announcers. Just like with WBZ, the emphasis at many radio stations had shifted to playing records. As the top-40 hit format proliferated, in an effort to attract the growing youth audience, WNAC and the Yankee Network stayed with the older music; this earned them praise from a number of newspaper columnists, many of whom were also getting older and found top-40 unpleasant. For them, WNAC's and the Yankee Network's emphasis on "great standards" and songs with "beautiful melodies" was very comforting. The Yankee stations, especially flagship WNAC, played the music that the older audience enjoyed, avoiding songs that were popular with young people and focusing on "easy listening" music. One popular announcer during this time was Gus Saunders, who was also well known as the host of another of the Yankee Network's cooking programs; in addition, Saunders announced some of the network's sports events, such as Boston's BAA Marathon. Another popular announcer was Vin Maloney, who like Saunders, fulfilled a wide range of functions for WNAC and the Yankee Network, including announcing, news-reading, and covering sports. The Yankee News Service remained popular throughout the 1950s, and listeners relied on it for local news and sports; this was especially true in the summer of 1957, when Boston's newspapers went on strike. WNAC, WNAC-TV, and the entire Yankee Network increased the amount of hourly newscasts, added more news bulletins, and sent out members of its Boston staff to post news headlines on billboards around the city.

In August 1959, the Yankee Network de-affiliated itself from Mutual Broadcasting System (MBS), allowing 27 Yankee stations to affiliate directly with MBS.

But despite its reputation for news, easy-listening music, and shows that homemakers enjoyed, the Yankee Network was no longer as influential as it had once been. After experimenting with various formats (including talk radio, big band, and a brief attempt to play some of the softer top 40 hits), Yankee found itself struggling for a niche. Affiliates had dwindled: a majority of stations now preferred to have their own local staff, rather than relying on a regional network. Further, flagship station WNAC was preparing to switch to a top-40 hit music format (under the call letters WRKO). The Yankee Network's parent company, RKO General, announced the network would be disbanded. It officially ceased operation on February 26, 1967.

== List of affiliates ==
City of license/market	State	Station	Band	Frequency	Owner (Management Company)	1932	1939	Notes
Bridgeport-New Haven	Connecticut	WICC	AM	600		Yes	Yes	
Hartford	Connecticut	WTIC	AM	1080	Travelers Insurance Company		Yes	
New London	Connecticut	WNLC	AM	1510	Thames Broadcasting Corporation		Yes	Originally on 1500 AM & then on 1490 AM post-NARBA until the 1960s. Now defunct
Bangor	Maine	WLBZ	AM	620	Maine Broadcasting Company	Yes	Yes	
Augusta	Maine	WRDO	AM	1400	The Rines family	Yes		
Portland	Maine	WCSH	AM	940		Yes		Frequency moved to 970 AM post-NARBA
Lewiston/Auburn	Maine	WCOU	AM	1240		Yes		
Boston	Massachusetts	WLEX/WAAB	AM	1440	Shepard Stores	Yes		City of license transferred to Worcester in 1942
Boston	Massachusetts	WNAC	AM	1260	Shepard Stores	Yes	Yes	Programming/call sign transferred to WNAC 680 in 1953
New Bedford	Massachusetts	WNBH	AM	1310		Yes	Yes	Frequency moved to 1340 AM post-NARBA
Worcester	Massachusetts	WORC	AM	1310		Yes		
Worcester	Massachusetts	WTAG	AM	580	Worcester Telegram & Gazette		Yes	
Fall River	Massachusetts	WSAR	AM	1450	Doughty & Welch Electric Company			Frequency moved to 1480 AM post-NARBA
Greenfield (Pioneer Valley)	Massachusetts	WHAI	AM	1210		Yes		Frequency moved to 1240 AM post-NARBA
Lowell-Lawrence	Massachusetts	WLLH	AM	1370	Alfred Moffat	Yes		Frequency moved to 1400 AM post-NARBA
Pittsfield	Massachusetts	WBRK	AM	1310		Yes		Frequency moved to 1340 AM post-NARBA
Laconia	New Hampshire	WLNH	AM	1310			Yes	Frequency moved to 1340 AM post-NARBA
Manchester	New Hampshire	WFEA	AM	1340	New Hampshire Broadcasting Company	Yes	Yes	Frequency moved to 1370 AM post-NARBA
Providence	Rhode Island	WEAN	AM	780	Shepard Stores	Yes	Yes	Frequency moved to 790 AM post-NARBA
