= Naked Sea =

1954 film directed by Allen H. Miner

- Directed by: Allen H. Miner
- Written by: Gerald Schnitzer
- Produced by: Allen H. Miner
- Cinematography: Allen H. Miner
- Edited by: Allen H. Miner
- Music by: Laurindo Almeida; George Fields
- Production company: Theatre Productions
- Distributed by: RKO Radio Pictures
- Release date: December 15, 1954 (US)
- Running time: 70 minutes
- Country: United States
- Language: English

Naked Sea is a 1954 American documentary film which follows the journey of the tuna-fishing boat the Star-Kist, on a four-month 15,000 mile journey fishing off the coast of South America. The film was produced, directed, shot and edited by Allen H. Miner. It was narrated by William Conrad, and was originally shot on 16mm film, then blown up to 35mm (with no apparent loss of quality) for theatrical distribution. The fishing boat used its normal crew, captained by Joachim Qualin.

== Critical reception ==
Allmovie wrote, "one of the best of the many feature-length documentaries distributed by RKO Radio in the mid-1950s...As the fishermen go about their appointed tasks, the camera soaks in a lot of local color, including a raging South American hurricane and the eruption of a Galápagos Islands volcano."
