= RKO General =

American broadcasting mass media corporation

RKO General Inc.
- Logo used from 1983 to 1991
- Formerly: General Teleradio Inc. (1952–55); RKO Teleradio Pictures Inc. (1955–59)
- Type: Subsidiary
- Industry: Broadcasting
- Founded: 1952; 74 years ago
- Defunct: 1991; 35 years ago (ceased operations; still nominally extant)
- Fate: Radio and television stations sold to other companies
- Successor: Raven Capital Management
- Headquarters: New York City, U.S.
- Area served: Canada; United States
- Parent: General Tire and Rubber Company (1955–84); GenCorp, Inc. (1984–2015); Aerojet Rocketdyne Holdings (2015–present)

RKO General Inc. (previously General Teleradio Inc. and RKO Teleradio Pictures Inc.) was an American broadcasting company that, from 1952 through 1991, served as the main holding company for the noncore businesses of the General Tire and Rubber Company and later on GenCorp, Inc. The concern was based around the consolidation of its parent company's broadcasting interests, which dated to 1943 and were brought together under the General Teleradio umbrella in 1952. The company was renamed RKO Teleradio Pictures following its 1955 purchase of the RKO Pictures film studio, and then RKO General in 1959 after dissolving the motion picture division. Headquartered in New York City, the company operated six television stations and more than a dozen major radio stations around North America between 1959 and 1991.

RKO General still exists, at least nominally, registered as a Delaware corporation and a subsidiary of GenCorp successor Aerojet Rocketdyne Holdings. In addition to broadcasting, its operations included soft-drink bottling and hotel enterprises. The original Frontier Airlines was a subsidiary from 1965 to 1985. In 1978, the company revived RKO Pictures on a small scale, with the first of its few coproductions reaching theaters in 1981; the business was sold off six years later. It is as a broadcaster, though, that RKO General left its mark. It owned some of the most influential radio stations in the world and was a pioneer in subscription television service. However, RKO General also became known for the longest licensing dispute in television history, one that ultimately forced the company out of broadcasting.

== History ==
=== Early days ===
The General Tire and Rubber Company entered broadcasting in 1943, when it bought a controlling interest in the Yankee Network, a regional radio network in New England. The Yankee Network owned and operated four stations: flagship WNAC in Boston, Massachusetts; WAAB in Worcester, Massachusetts; WEAN in Providence, Rhode Island; and WICC in Bridgeport, Connecticut. With the Yankee Network purchase, General Tire also picked up its contracts with seventeen independently owned affiliates and acquired a stake in the Mutual Broadcasting System, a cooperatively owned national radio network.

On June 21, 1948, the Yankee Network launched New England's third television station: Boston's WNAC-TV went on the air just days after WBZ-TV, also in Boston, and WNHC-TV, licensed to New Haven, Connecticut. The television station's transmitter site also served a new FM outlet, the first and only station to be established under General Tire ownership. While the Yankee Network had been operating experimental FM stations since 1939, WNAC-FM was the first that would survive past the early 1950s.

In December 1950, General Tire purchased the Don Lee Network, a long-standing West Coast regional network, for $12.3 million. This brought three more leading stations into the General Tire stable—KHJ (with its simulcasting sister, KHJ-FM) in Los Angeles, KFRC in San Francisco, and KGB in San Diego. The acquisition also expanded the company's holdings in the Mutual Broadcasting System. Under the terms of the deal, the Columbia Broadcasting System (CBS) acquired Don Lee's Los Angeles television station, KTSL. In 1951, General Tire acquired its own station in the city when it bought KFI-TV from Earle C. Anthony, changing the call letters to KHJ-TV.

In 1952, General Tire purchased the Bamberger Broadcasting Service, owner of WOR-AM-FM-TV in New York, from R.H. Macy and Company. Bamberger itself was a division of Macy's subsidiary General Teleradio Inc. In the deal, General Tire acquired the rights to the name General Teleradio, under which the company merged its broadcasting interests as its own new subsidiary. The deal also gave General Tire majority control of the Mutual Broadcasting System. The company moved into Memphis, Tennessee, in 1954 with its purchase of WHBQ radio and WHBQ-TV. Exiting two mid-sized urban markets that same year, General sold off WEAN to the Providence Journal and KGB to the San Diego station's general manager, Marion Harris. On the evening of July 8, 1954, WHBQ disc jockey Dewey Phillips introduced a song called "That's All Right (Mama)", the first ever recording to air on the radio by a singer from Memphis named Elvis Presley.

=== The RKO purchase ===
General Teleradio's chairman, Thomas O'Neil (son of General Tire founder William O'Neil) recognized that his television stations needed access to better programming. In 1953, he tried to buy the film library of RKO Radio Pictures—including many of the most famous movies made by Fred Astaire, Ginger Rogers, Katharine Hepburn, and Cary Grant—but was rebuffed by the studio's then owner, Howard Hughes. However, after Hughes failed in a bid to acquire total control of the RKO Pictures Corp. holding company, he sold the studio to General Teleradio for $25 million in July 1955. General Teleradio was rechristened RKO Teleradio Pictures, with a reorganized RKO Radio Pictures as its motion pictures division, and quickly recouped much of the purchase price by selling the primary rights to RKO's film library to C&C Television Corp, a subsidiary of beverage maker Cantrell & Cochrane, for $15.2 million. Historian William Boddy describes the sale of the RKO library as "the trigger for the flood of feature films to television in the mid-1950s."

On the broadcasting front, RKO Teleradio briefly owned WEAT and WEAT-TV in West Palm Beach, Florida; they were sold off before the company's next reorganization in 1959. In 1956, WOR became the New York market's number one station with the success of its new "Music from Studio X." Hosted by John A. Gambling, the "easy listening" show was broadcast out of an innovative high-fidelity studio where, according to reports, "each clean new record was touched by a needle only one time." Also in 1956, a new General Tire subsidiary, RKO Distributing (which would later become part of RKO General), acquired a controlling interest in the Western Ontario Broadcasting Company, which operated CKLW-AM-FM-TV in Windsor, Ontario. Another Mutual affiliate, the AM station served a large swath of the U.S. Rust Belt, centered on the major market of Detroit.

RKO Teleradio retained the broadcast rights to the RKO film library in the cities where it owned television stations, but it had little interest in the studio itself. After a brief, half-hearted dip into the movie industry, RKO Teleradio shut down both production and distribution early in 1957. That summer, it sold its entire majority stake in the Mutual network to a syndicate led by famed entrepreneur Armand Hammer. By the end of the year, the company had sold off the RKO Pictures studio facilities and backlot (Gower Street in Hollywood and the RKO-Pathé lot (now Culver Studios) in Culver City, with the Forty Acres backlot) to Desilu, boosting Desi Arnaz and Lucille Ball's booming young TV studio. The RKO movie operation hung on through 1958 and early 1959 as a financial backer, co-producing a few independently made pictures. The final such coproduction was released in March 1959. That same year, RKO Teleradio was renamed RKO General.

=== A leading broadcaster ===
Promotional material from 1968 for KHJ (AM) in Los Angeles, where the nationally successful Boss Radio format was launched.

The classic RKO General station lineup featured the WOR stations in New York City, the KHJ stations in Los Angeles, KFRC-AM-FM in San Francisco, WGMS-AM-FM in and near Washington, D.C., the WNAC stations in Boston, the WHBQ stations in Memphis, and the CKLW stations in Windsor/Detroit, which RKO purchased outright in 1963. The company later acquired radio outlets in the major markets of Chicago and Miami–Fort Lauderdale. Between 1960 and 1972, RKO owned a sixth television station, WHCT, a UHF outlet in Hartford, Connecticut. After the Canadian government tightened rules on foreign ownership of radio and television stations, RKO General was forced to sell off the Windsor group in 1970. In the mid-1970s, RKO sought to dispense with the FM outlets it had established in some of its oldest markets, while maintaining its presence on the AM dial: San Francisco's KFRC-FM was sold in 1977; around the same time, WHBQ-FM in Memphis was divested as well. An attempted sale of the company's Boston FM station was aborted.

In 1959, RKO and NBC reached an agreement on what would have been the highest-priced license transfer in broadcasting history to that time. The deal would have seen RKO acquire NBC's WRC-AM-FM-TV in Washington, swap WNAC-AM-TV and WRKO-FM (the former WNAC-FM) in Boston to NBC for that company's WRCV-AM-TV in Philadelphia, and sell the WGMS stations in Washington to Crowell-Collier Broadcasting (as Federal Communications Commission {FCC} regulations at that time would not permit ownership of both the WRC stations and the WGMS stations). The deal was an attempt to resolve a controversy surrounding a 1956 swap of NBC and Westinghouse Broadcasting stations in Philadelphia and Cleveland. In 1965, the FCC declared the 1956 trade null and void, effectively reversing the swap, and denied the proposed license transfers on what would prove to be the ironic ground that NBC would enter the Boston market as the product of its dishonesty in the Philadelphia/Cleveland transaction. Coincidentally, RKO's former Boston television station became an NBC affiliate in 1995 after its longtime affiliate, Westinghouse-owned WBZ-TV, switched to CBS in a precursor to that network's merger with Westinghouse, which includes the aforementioned Philadelphia stations.

RKO's lineup included some of the leading top 40 and urban contemporary radio stations in North America. In May 1965, KHJ introduced the highly successful Boss Radio variation of the top 40 format. Consultants Bill Drake and Gene Chenault, who had devised the restrictive programming style, soon brought it to RKO's AM stations in San Francisco, Boston, and Memphis, also with great success. The format helped Windsor's CKLW to become the dominant station not only in Detroit, but also in more distant cities such as Cleveland and Toledo, Ohio. In turn, CKLW's Paul Drew became an influential tastemaker when he assumed group program director duties of the entire RKO cluster, earning a reputation for breaking new hit records to a national audience. After the Canadian government decreed in 1969 that the country's radio and television stations must be at least 80 percent domestically owned, RKO sold the CKLW group to a joint venture of Baton Broadcasting and the CBC.

Many non-RKO broadcasters around the U.S. were already hiring the Boss Radio consulting team to convert them to the format, or simply imitating it on their own. In October 1972, KHJ-FM debuted Drake-Chenault's new automated rock oldies format, Classic Gold, another major hit. As WOR-FM and its later incarnations, rock-formatted WXLO and urban WRKS-FM, RKO's New York FM station pioneered a number of styles, including a more oldies-heavy version of Boss Radio and, later, so-called rhythmic formats. In 1983, it became one of the first major stations to play rap music on a regular basis. In late 1979, the company launched the RKO Radio Network. In 1981, the network began transmitting what has been claimed as the first national talk show delivered by satellite—the six-hour-long America Overnight broadcast out of Los Angeles and Dallas, Texas.

As a television broadcaster, RKO was known as an operator of independent stations. New York's WOR-TV ran without network affiliation during its entire tenure with RKO, as did Hartford's WHCT. Los Angeles's KHJ-TV was a DuMont affiliate until 1955 and independent for its next thirty-four years under RKO control. Windsor's CKLW-TV was nominally an affiliate of CBC Television, but was programmed largely as an independent (it is now owned by the CBC outright). Two of the company's stations were run as network affiliates: Boston's WNAC-TV, originally a CBS affiliate, also aired DuMont and ABC programming during its early years. It became a full-time ABC affiliate in 1961, returning to CBS exclusively in 1972. Memphis's WHBQ-TV was a dual CBS/ABC station at its 1953 launch; it joined ABC full-time in 1956.

The company's independent television stations (including CKLW) were known for showing classic films under the banner of Million Dollar Movie. The trend-setting movie package was launched by WOR in 1954, nearly a year before General Tire's acquisition of RKO Pictures and its library. Into the 1980s, Million Dollar Movie—introduced by music from 1952's Ivanhoe and, later, Gone with the Wind—aired RKO productions and those of many other studios as well. In summer 1962, RKO General initiated on WHCT what became the first extended venture into subscription television service. Until January 31, 1969, the station aired movies, sports events, concerts, and other live performances at night without commercial interruption through the Phonevision subscription service operated by RKO's partner, Zenith Electronics. The operation generated income from installation and weekly rental fees for descrambling devices—provided by Zenith—as well as individual program charges. During its final decade as a significant business entity, the company would reenter the movie industry that had given it its name, reviving the RKO Pictures brand in 1981 for a series of co-productions and then its own independent projects. This new RKO Pictures was involved in the production of about a dozen feature films, the best known including a 1982 remake of the RKO classic Cat People and the war movie Hamburger Hill (1987).

=== Weirum v. RKO General, Inc. ===
In the summer of 1970, KHJ in Los Angeles held a promotion called the "Super Summer Spectacular". The promotion involved contests in which a disc jockey would drive "a conspicuous red automobile" to a particular area, which an announcer would describe over the air. The first person who found the disc jockey and fulfilled a specified condition, such as answering a question correctly or wearing a certain item of clothing, would receive a cash prize and be interviewed live.

On July 16, 1970, two teenagers, who were following a KHJ disc jockey in separate cars, drove at speeds up to eighty miles per hour so that they could be closest to him when the next contest was announced. One of the teenagers forced 32-year-old Ronald Weirum's car off the road; Weirum was killed when his car overturned. Weirum's wife and children filed a wrongful death action against both teenagers, the manufacturer of Weirum's car, and RKO. One of the teenagers settled with the plaintiffs before trial. A jury found the second teenager and RKO both liable for the accident, awarding the plaintiffs $300,000 in damages. RKO appealed. In 1975, the California Supreme Court affirmed the jury's verdict that RKO was legally liable for the accident, holding that there was sufficient evidence to permit the jury to find that the contest's risk of harm to the public, including Weirum, had been "foreseeable":

We need not belabor the grave danger inherent in the contest broadcast by defendant. The risk of a high speed automobile chase is the risk of death or serious injury. Obviously, neither the entertainment afforded by the contest nor its commercial rewards can justify the creation of such a grave risk. Defendant could have accomplished its objectives of entertaining its listeners and increasing advertising revenues by adopting a contest format which would have avoided danger to the motoring public.

The California Supreme Court's ruling in Weirum v. RKO General, Inc. became a touchstone decision on the subject of the duty of care in tort law.

=== Licensing dispute ===
==== Troubles begin ====
In 1965, RKO applied for renewal of its license for KHJ-TV in Los Angeles. Fidelity Television, a local group, challenged the renewal, charging RKO with second-rate programming. Later, and more seriously, Fidelity claimed that General Tire conditioned its dealings with certain vendors on the basis that they would in turn buy advertising time on RKO stations. Arrangements of this type, known as "reciprocal trade practices," are considered to be anti-competitive. RKO and General Tire executives testified before the FCC, rejecting the accusations. In 1969, the commission issued an initial finding that Fidelity's claims were correct. That same year, RKO faced a license challenge for WNAC-TV in Boston, again charged with reciprocal trade practices. In 1973, the FCC ruled in favor of RKO in the Los Angeles case, pending findings in the still ongoing investigation of the Boston charges. When RKO applied for renewal of its license for WOR-TV in New York in 1974, the FCC conditioned this renewal on the Boston case as well.

On June 21, 1974, an administrative law judge renewed the WNAC-TV license despite finding that General Tire and RKO had engaged in reciprocal trade practices. In December 1975, Community Broadcasting, one of the companies competing for the Boston station, asked the FCC to revisit the case, alleging that General Tire bribed foreign officials, maintained a slush fund for U.S. political campaign contributions, and misappropriated revenue from overseas operations. RKO expressly denied these and other allegations of wrongdoing on General Tire's part during a series of proceedings that followed over the next year and a half. On July 1, 1977, however, in settling an action brought by the Securities and Exchange Commission (SEC), General Tire admitted to an eye-popping litany of corporate misconduct, including the bribery and slush fund charges. Nonetheless, the RKO proceedings dragged on.

==== The loss of WNAC-TV ====
After a half-decade in the most recent round of hearings and investigations, the FCC stripped RKO of WNAC-TV's license on June 6, 1980, finding that RKO "lacked the requisite character" to be the station's licensee. Factors in the decision were the reciprocal trade practices of the 1960s, false financial filings by RKO, and the gross misconduct admitted to by General Tire in non-broadcast fields.

The primary basis for revocation, however, was RKO's dishonesty before the FCC. In the course of the WNAC hearings, RKO had withheld evidence of General Tire's misconduct, including the fact that the SEC had begun an investigation of the company in 1976. RKO also denied that it had improperly reported exchanges of broadcast time for various services, despite indications to the contrary in General Tire's 1976 annual report. The FCC consequently found that RKO had displayed a "persistent lack of candor" regarding its own and General Tire's misdeeds, thus threatening "the integrity of the Commission's processes." The FCC ruling meant that RKO lost the KHJ-TV and WOR-TV licenses as well.

RKO appealed the decision to the United States Court of Appeals for the District of Columbia. The court upheld the revocation solely on the basis of RKO's "egregious lack of candor” during the FCC hearing, writing in its opinion that "[t]he record presented to this court shows irrefutably that the licensee was playing the dodger to serious charges involving it and its parent company." However, the court interpreted the candor issue so narrowly that it only upheld the decision to strip WNAC-TV's license. It ordered rehearings for the WOR-TV and KHJ-TV licenses. RKO again appealed, this time to the United States Supreme Court. On April 19, 1982, the Supreme Court refused to review the license revocation; RKO had lost the case for good. As a result of the decision, RKO sold WNAC-TV's non-license assets (studios, intellectual property, etc.) to New England Television (NETV), a new company resulting from the merger of Community Broadcasting and another competitor for the license, the Dudley Station Corporation. As part of the settlement, the FCC granted a full license to NETV, which relaunched the station as WNEV-TV. The station has since changed its call letters to WHDH-TV (not to be confused with Boston's original Channel 5 that used the same call letters).

==== Endgame ====
In February 1983, the FCC began a concerted effort to force RKO out of broadcasting once and for all, taking competing applications for all of the company's broadcasting licenses. However, RKO got a partial, and temporary, reprieve when Congress passed a law requiring the FCC to automatically renew the license of any commercial VHF television station relocating to a state without one, “notwithstanding any other provision of law.” The only states qualifying at the time were Delaware and New Jersey, where no commercial VHF outlet had been licensed since 1962. On April 20, 1983, RKO officially changed WOR-TV's city of license from New York to Secaucus, New Jersey, where it remains today. The FCC required the station to move its main studio to New Jersey and step up local news coverage of events in the state. Nonetheless, with featured programming such as New York Mets baseball games, WOR-TV maintained its identity as a New York station. Ironically, WOR radio was first licensed to nearby Newark, New Jersey, and didn't move to New York until 1941.

A year after the renewal of the WOR-TV license, General Tire reorganized its farflung corporate interests into a holding company, GenCorp, with General Tire and RKO as its leading subsidiaries. The RKO Radio Networks operation was sold to United Stations. The WOR move did little to relieve the regulatory pressure on RKO General, and GenCorp put WOR-TV on the market in early 1986. A joint venture between MCA and Cox Enterprises (Cox later dropped out over disputes as to which company would run the station) outbid Chris-Craft Industries and Westinghouse for control of the station, receiving FCC approval for the purchase in late November. On April 29, 1987, MCA changed the station's call letters to WWOR.

The timing of the WOR-TV sale was fortunate for RKO. In August 1987, FCC administrative law judge Edward Kuhlmann found RKO unfit to be a broadcast licensee due to its long history of deceptive practices, ordering the company to surrender the licenses for its remaining two television stations and twelve radio stations. Among other things, he found that RKO misled advertisers about its ratings, engaged in fraudulent billing, lied repeatedly to the FCC about a destroyed audit report, and filed numerous false financial statements. Kuhlmann described RKO's conduct as the worst case of dishonesty in FCC history. After declaring that all of the employees responsible for the misconduct had been fired, GenCorp and RKO entered an appeal, claiming that the ruling was deeply flawed. The FCC warned RKO that any appeal would almost certainly be denied outright, and advised them to sell off their remaining stations to avoid the indignity of having their licenses stripped. GenCorp, then battling a hostile takeover bid by an investor group, was hungry for cash as a result of paying a premium on its own shares to stave off the attack. Liquidation of assets on the verge of being lost was the obvious course.

=== Exiting the media business ===
Over the next four years, RKO dismantled its broadcast operations. Both its AM and FM stations in Boston were sold to Atlantic Ventures. In New York, WOR was acquired by Buckley Broadcasting and WRKS-FM (the former WOR-FM) went to Summit Communications. The company's two radio stations in the Washington, D.C., market were sold to Classical Acquisition Partnership. In Los Angeles, the KRTH (formerly KHJ) radio stations were purchased by Beasley Broadcasting, which in turn sold KRTH AM to Liberman Broadcasting. Liberman renamed the station KKHJ, then restored the original KHJ calls in 2000.

In 1988, the decades-long licensing saga of KHJ-TV officially came to an end. Under an FCC-supervised deal, RKO gave up its bid to renew the station's license, which was then granted to Fidelity Television, the company that had raised the original challenge to RKO General twenty-three years earlier. Fidelity then transferred the license to The Walt Disney Company, which then bought KHJ-TV's non-license assets, including its studios and intellectual property, from RKO. For the station and its assets, Disney paid $324 million, with RKO collecting approximately two-thirds and Fidelity the remainder. According to FCC general counsel Diane Killory, the settlement had the effect of finding that RKO was unfit to be a broadcast licensee, and the company now had no choice but to get out of broadcasting. Disney would rename the Los Angeles station KCAL-TV the following year. During this period, the company also divested its radio stations in Chicago and Miami–Fort Lauderdale, as well as the remaining assets of its movie-related operations.

By the turn of the decade, RKO's last significant media holdings were the WHBQ TV and AM radio stations in Memphis and KFRC in San Francisco. In 1990, the Memphis stations were sold to Adams Communications. The following year, KFRC was sold to Bedford Broadcasting. RKO General was out of the broadcasting business.

== Former holdings ==
Stations are arranged in alphabetical order by state and community of license.

Media market	State/Dist./Prov.	Station	Purchased	Sold	Notes
Los Angeles	California	KHJ	1951	1989	(Note: Known as KRTH from 1986 onward.)
Los Angeles	California	KRTH-FM	1951	1989	(Note: Known as KHJ-FM prior to 1972.)
Los Angeles	California	KHJ-TV	1951	1988	
San Diego	California	KGB	1951	1954	
San Francisco	California	KFRC	1951	1991	
San Francisco	California	KFRC-FM	1960	1977	
Bridgeport	Connecticut	WICC	1943	1952	
Hartford–New Haven	Connecticut	WGTH	1946	1956	(Note: Known as WONS prior to 1953.)
Hartford–New Haven	Connecticut	WHCT	1954	1956	(Note: Known as WGTH-TV prior to 1956.)
Hartford–New Haven	Connecticut	WHCT	1958	1972	(Note: Known as WGTH-TV prior to 1956.)
Washington, D.C.	District of Columbia	WGMS	1957	1989	
Washington, D.C.	District of Columbia	WGMS-FM	1957	1989	
Fort Lauderdale–Miami	Florida	WAXY-FM	1973	1990	
West Palm Beach	Florida	WEAT	1955	1957	
West Palm Beach	Florida	WEAT-TV	1955	1957	
Chicago	Illinois	WFYR-FM	1973	1989	
Boston	Massachusetts	WNAC	1943	1953	
Boston	Massachusetts	WRKO	1953	1989	(Note: Known as WNAC prior to 1967.)
Boston	Massachusetts	WROR	1948	1989	(Note: Known as WNAC-FM prior to 1957 and WRKO-FM from 1957 to 1968.)
Boston	Massachusetts	WNAC-TV	1948	1982	(Note: License for this station was cancelled.)
Worcester	Massachusetts	WAAB	1943	1950	
Worcester	Massachusetts	WGTR	1943	1953	(Note: Known as W43B prior to 1943.)
New York	New York	WOR	1952	1989	
New York	New York	WRKS-FM	1952	1989	(Note: Known as WOR-FM prior to 1972 and WXLO from 1972 to 1981.)
New York	New York	WOR-TV	1952	1987	
Windsor	Ontario	CKLW	1956	1970	
Windsor	Ontario	CKLW-FM	1956	1970	
Windsor	Ontario	CKLW-TV	1956	1970	
Providence	Rhode Island	WEAN	1943	1954	
Memphis	Tennessee	WHBQ	1954	1990	
Memphis	Tennessee	WHBQ-FM	1954	1972	
Memphis	Tennessee	WHBQ-TV	1954	1990	
