= Paul Benzaquin =

Paul Benzaquin

Paul Benzaquin (died February 13, 2013) was a 20th-century American broadcaster in the city of Boston, a pioneer of talk radio. He was inducted into the Massachusetts Broadcasters Hall of Fame in 2007.

Benzaquin was born and raised in Quincy, Massachusetts. His father was a grain merchant, his civic-minded mother a founder of the local chapter of the League of Women Voters. After high school, he attended a seminary in Bangor, Maine, for a year. He served with the 37th Infantry Division during World War II on Bougainville and in the Philippines, and was awarded the Bronze Star.

Benzaquin then embarked on a journalism career in 1948 at the Boston Globe. He wrote the 1959 nonfiction bestseller Holocaust! about the Cocoanut Grove fire which uncovered malfeasance on the part of the nightclub's employees. Shortly after that he moved to radio broadcasting, starting in September 1960 at WEEI, where he soon afterward announced Logan Airport's first air disaster, the October 1960 crash of a Lockheed Electra. He later worked at most of Boston's big news stations: WHDH, WBZ and WRKO, also writing a column for the Boston Herald Traveler from 1964 to 1969. He was one of the first radio broadcasters to be suspended, in 1968, for uttering a profanity on the air. He spent a year at Chicago station WLS-TV, but returned to Boston in 1971.

He had a kind of imperial presence that inspired respect, even awe, and yet he could be warm and genial. And what a voice.

— Steve Elman, Burning Up The Air

In the 1970s, as an outspoken feminist, Mr. Benzaquin became interested in early childhood development and produced a long-running series for WEEI called "Being a Baby". The broadcasts featured his reporting on a group of babies from Marshfield, Massachusetts, and also featured experts such as Harvard psychologist Burton White. He later hosted a late-night television talk show on WBZ-TV. He announced his retirement in 1989, but then returned to work at WRKO from 1992 to 1996.

In 1983, he was sued by a Massachusetts State Trooper for defamation following a traffic stop, which Benzaquin then described on the air. He won the suit when the judge ruled that Benzaquin's characterization of the officer, using various derogatory terms such as "absolute barbarian", "reprehensible" and "merciless", constituted mere vulgar abuse and hyperbole, and therefore First Amendment protected speech.

Benzaquin, a longtime resident of Marshfield, was married to Barbara J. Benzaquin for more than 25 years. This ended in divorce, and he later married the former Grace Abrams. He had two sons and a daughter.

== Works ==
- Benzaquin, Paul (1959). Holocaust!. Holt. ISBN 978-0828311601. (Later editions were titled Fire in Boston's Coconut Grove or Fire in Boston's Coconut Grove – Holocaust! and were published by Pan (1962) and Branden Press (1967))
