= Stephen Capen =

American DJ (1946–2005)

- Born: Stephen Harold Capen; February 28, 1946; Cambridge, Massachusetts, US
- Died: September 12, 2005 (aged 59); Plymouth, Massachusetts, US
- Spouse: Susan Wu
- Children: 6
- Presenting career
- Stations: WAAB; KFRC; KMEL; KSAN (AM); KSAN (FM); KSFX (FM); KYLD; KSOL; WBZ (AM); WFFG (FM); KVON; KVYN; KFOG
- Style: DJ; Comedian
- Previous show: Futurist Radio Hour

Stephen Harold Capen (February 28, 1946 – September 12, 2005) was an American announcer and disc jockey whose humor found favor with audiences in several major cities but particularly in the San Francisco Bay Area. In the mid-1960s, he began his radio career in Caribou, Maine.

== Biography ==
=== Early life and education ===
Capen, the second of four children, was born in Cambridge, Massachusetts to Hobart Ashley Capen and Mary Capen (née Morgan).

=== Career ===
==== 1960s and 1970s ====
WCSB in Boston, MA (1964).
WFST in Caribou, ME (1965–1966).
WBZA in Glens Falls, NY (1966–1967).
WAAB in Worcester, MA (1967–1968).
WDRC-FM in Hartford, Connecticut (1969).
WCCC in Hartford, Connecticut (1969–1970).
WGLD in Chicago, IL (Afternoons, 1970–1971)
CJOM in Windsor, Ontario (Detroit market) (1970–1972).
WNCR in Cleveland, Ohio (1972–1976).
WCOZ in Boston, Massachusetts (1976–1979).

==== 1980s ====
KSAN-FM in San Francisco, CA in (1980–1981) - (Last year of its pioneering 12-year run as a progressive rock station before it switched to a country format) with long time friend and producer, Hank Rosenfeld.
KSFX (FM) in San Francisco, CA (1981–1982) - "Rock N Stereo" (with Rosie Allen).
KMEL in San Francisco, CA (1984–1985).
WXRK (K-Rock) in New York City, New York (1988–1989) - Hosted the afternoon drive-time slot that had been vacated by Howard Stern when Stern moved to mornings and began national syndication of his show. Meg Griffin (DJ) was also at K-Rock until her move to Sirius Satellite Radio.

==== 1990s ====
Capen resisted the media-merger consolidation of radio stations and developed alternative interests in psychology, photography and travel, writing for publications including San Francisco magazine, The Village Voice, the Pacific Sun, Shambhala Sun, Writer's Digest, and LensWork Quarterly, lecturing at the University of San Francisco and California State University, Hayward, and making pilgrimages to Cuba, China, Greece, and the mountains of Peru. He filed occasional broadcast reports for CBS News Radio and its affiliated network of stations, reported news for KVON/KVYN-FM in Napa, California, and, in his final radio work in July 2004, commentaries from Boston's 2004 Democratic National Convention for CBS all-news affiliate KNX (AM) in Los Angeles, California.

- KFOG in San Francisco, CA (1992 –1993).
- KDBK in San Francisco, CA (1993 –1994).
- KUSF in San Francisco, CA (1993 –1997) - "The Futurist Radio Hour" - Interviews with Alan Arkin, Paulo Coelho, Amanda Plummer, James Hillman, Paul Theroux, China Galland, Isabel Fonseca, Christopher Hitchens and "Jive Radio" with Ben Fong-Torres from 91-95.
- KVON/KVYN-FM in Napa, California (1998-2000).

=== Death ===
Capen died on September 12, 2005, near Plymouth, Massachusetts, of lung cancer, aged 59.
