= Music from Studio X =

American radio program

Music from Studio X was an American network radio program of recorded music on the Mutual Broadcasting System originating from WOR in New York City. The program premiered on July 9, 1956 with host John A. Gambling; it was heard Monday through Saturday between 9:05 pm and 1 am EST, and on Sundays between 1:30 pm and 5 pm, with a 15-minute news break at 11 pm by newscaster Lyle Van. The theme music was written and conducted by Joe Leahy. Columnist J.P. Shanley's New York Times' review of July 10, 1956 praised the program, calling it "a welcome step in the direction of civilized radio entertainment", designed to appeal to "listeners who are interested neither in the classics nor in rock and roll". Lush instrumentals and vocal recordings were aired, many of them original to the program. On the program's premiere broadcast, music from the then-contemporary "My Fair Lady" was featured. WOR actually did construct a special studio – Studio X – for the new program at the station. Gambling remained host of "Music from Studio X" until it ended in 1960.

General Teleradio (later known as RKO-General) at that time controlled RKO Radio Pictures' record subsidiary RKO/Unique Records as well as the Mutual network, and used the Studio X program to promote recordings by RKO/Unique artists; including performers like Rudy Vallee, Ted Lewis, and The Harmonicats, whose most successful years were past them by this time. RKO/Unique also released an LP of Joe Leahy's theme music from the program. WPAT-FM in Paterson, New Jersey had been presenting a similar program entitled "Gaslight".
