= Hum and Strum =

Vaudevillian musical duo

Hum and Strum were a popular vaudevillian musical duo from the Boston, Massachusetts area. Their singing career began in the early 1920s and lasted through the late 1950s, on the stage, on radio, and then on television.

== Early career ==
Max Zides (Hum) and Tom Currier (Strum) met at Boston's High School of Commerce; they were both Class of 1921. At Commerce, they were on the track team together, and they became friends. But it was not until a few years later that they became a vocal duo. Before that happened, Zides, who played the ukulele, was performing as a solo artist over WBZ radio. His day job was working in the advertising department of the Boston Globe, but he hoped to become a full-time radio performer. One day, at the offices of a music publisher, Zides ran into Currier, who would later play piano for Hum and Strum. At the time, Currier was driving a truck, but he too hoped to get a break and work in the entertainment business. They decided to form a vocal duo, which became known as Hum and Strum. Zides and Currier first began performing together over greater Boston's pioneering radio station WGI at Medford Hillside in April 1924. They quickly became regulars on Boston radio, mostly performing on WBZ, but sometimes being heard on WEEI. They were hard-working musicians: in addition to singing on radio, they regularly performed in area clubs; their first series of performances was at the Loew's State Theater in Boston, where they were paid $100 a week. They were soon playing other key venues, like Boston's Keith-Albee Theatre, and The Palace in New York. In one of their early vaudeville performances, they shared the bill with George Burns and Gracie Allen. Hum and Strum built a loyal following by developing a formula that served them well throughout their career: audiences liked their close vocal harmonies, and appreciated their humorous banter; critics noted that the two men were unpretentious, and genuinely enthusiastic about entertaining their listeners. In the late 1920s, Hum and Strum were being heard on stations outside of Boston, including performances on the NBC Blue Network. Beginning in early July 1929, they performed in Cleveland on station WHK as the Oxiton Joy Boys, sponsored by a company that made mouthwash. One 1929 listeners' poll ranked them in the top 3 nationally among all radio performers.

== Later career ==
During 1933-34, Hum and Strum returned to Cleveland, where they had become very popular when they performed on the air in 1929. This time, they mostly sang over station WTAM. They then returned to Boston, resuming their regular performances over WBZ, and doing live performances throughout New England. The duo were always well-received, wherever they played: a typical advertisement for one of their live shows referred to them as "radio's leading harmony team." In addition to continuing their regular performances on WBZ, and occasionally on WNAC, they played various night clubs, including a long engagement at the Cocoanut Grove in 1938. By the early 1940s, the joined the USO; they had already been entertaining the troops at New England military bases, but in 1944, they went overseas with other performers as part of a USO tour. The tour took them to military bases in Italy and North Africa. Over the years, the duo also became known for their philanthropy, performing numerous benefit concerts for worthy causes. One of their favorite causes was promoting religious tolerance: Hum, who was Jewish, and Currier, a Catholic, received a number of awards, including an Achievement Award for promoting brotherhood, given by the Winthrop (Massachusetts) Council of Christians and Jews; and a citation of merit award from the Dorchester/Blue Hills chapter of B'Nai B'rith, during Brotherhood Week.

In 1947, Hum and Strum began to make some records, cutting eighteen songs for the Stellar Recording Company. Most were standards or popular songs of that era, and several became local hits in New England, thanks to radio and jukebox airplay. They also recorded an Irish novelty song that they had performed live (Tom Currier was of Irish ancestry); the song was issued on a Boston label, Copley Records, around the same time period at the Stellar sides. Meanwhile, Hum and Strum discovered they had two unexpected fans: radio comedy duo Bob and Ray. Bob Elliott and Ray Goulding enjoyed listening to them on Boston radio, and even did a parody of Hum and Strum during a "Matinee with Bob and Ray" program. (The parody, including a satirical version of the Hum and Strum theme song, aired on the Bob and Ray show of December 1, 1950.)

In the late 1940s, when television began to overtake radio, Hum and Strum were able to easily make the transition, getting their own program on WBZ-TV in 1949. By 1953, the popular duo had been entertaining audiences for 29 years, and were on the air at WJAR-TV in Providence. In 1955, more than three decades since their broadcasting career began, their program moved to WMUR-TV, Manchester New Hampshire. When they announced in late 1958 that they would be retiring from show business after thirty-five years together, a reception and testimonial was held in their honor; 800 people attended, including John B. Hynes, the mayor of Boston; Big Brother Bob Emery, popular children's show host; and many other local dignitaries, including members of the clergy. Although Zides and Currier ceased performing as a duo the following year, they did come out of retirement once in a while to perform at a special occasion, such as in 1963, when they sang for the Boston Herald-Traveler Quarter Century Club. After their retirement, Zides became the public relations director for eight Boston-area bowling alleys, while Currier moved to Ft. Lauderdale, where he occasionally performed as a solo act. Max Zides died in 1975. Thomas Currier died in 1986.
