= Frazier Hunt =

American war correspondent (1885–1967)

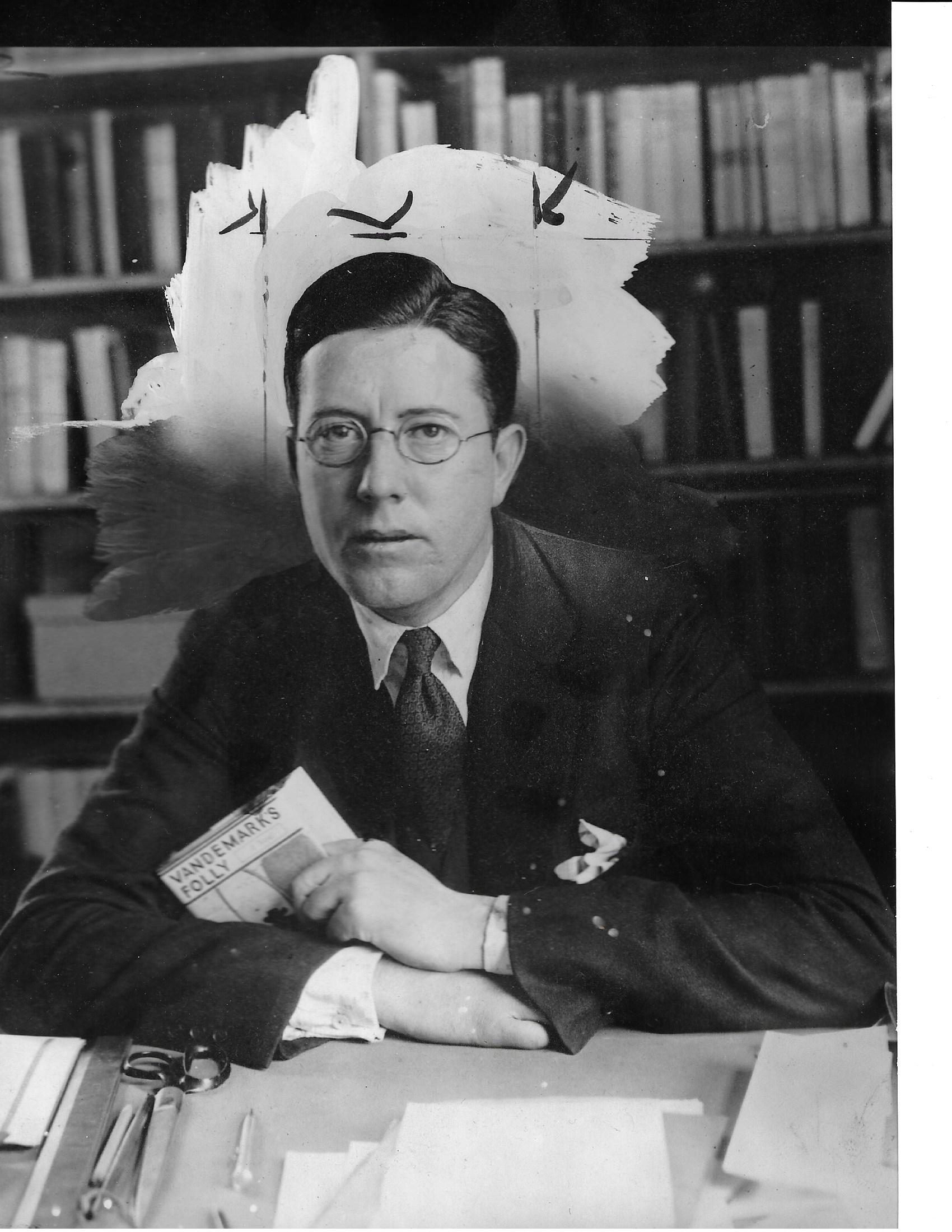
Frazier Hunt (c. 1922)

Frazier Hunt (December 1, 1885 – December 24, 1967) was an American radio announcer, writer and war correspondent during World War I and World War II. He wrote several books about his experience during both World Wars as well as historical biographies on famous Americans such as General George Armstrong Custer, Billy the Kid, and Douglas MacArthur.

== Biography ==
Hunt on the cover of Editor & Publisher (October 30, 1919)

Hunt was born in Rock Island, Illinois. He spent his boyhood in Indiana, Chicago and Mexico. In 1908, Hunt graduated from the University of Illinois with an A.B. degree. After writing for newspapers and magazines in Chicago until 1910, he found work as a sugar cane planter in southern Mexico. In 1913, Hunt returned to the small mid-western town of Alexis, Illinois to edit the local paper. It was with this background that he came to New York City in 1916 and joined the staff of The Sun. From New York he went to France and from there to Russia where for months he had the Revolution all to himself. In 1919, he smuggled a copy of the Treaty of Versailles, scooping the story. He served as the European editor for Cosmoplitan Magazine, interviewing Vladimir Lenin, Joseph Stalin, and Adolf Hitler. He also traveled to the Far East, covering the Sino-Japanese War.

One of his better-selling books was about his World War I experiences entitled Blown in By the Draft, published by Doubleday in 1918. During the 1930s, he purchased the ranch "Eden Valley" in southern Alberta, where he met Edward, the Prince of Wales (future Edward VIII), teaching him how to play poker. MacArthur and the War Against Japan was based upon his war correspondence duties as he followed Douglas MacArthur through the Pacific, as was Untold Story of General MacArthur, an expanded biography published in 1954.

As a broadcaster, Hunt presented Frazier Hunt and the News on the CBS Radio Network in the early 1940s.

Hunt has a star on the Hollywood Walk of Fame; he was inducted on February 8, 1960. He died at Abington Hospital in 1967 after suffering a stroke at his home in Newtown, Bucks County, Pennsylvania.

== Published books ==
- Blown in by the Draft (1918)
- The Rising Temper of the East (1922)
- Sycamore Bend
- Custer: The Last of the Cavaliers
- Bachelor Prince (1935)
- One American (1938)
- Little Doc
- The Long Trail from Texas (1940)
- MacArthur and the War Against Japan (1944)
- Cap Mossman: Last of the Great Cowmen (1951)
- The Untold Story of Douglas Macarthur (1954)
- "The Tragic Days of Billy the Kid" (1956)

== In collaboration with son Robert Hunt ==
- I Fought with Custer (1947)
- Horses & Heroes

== Other sources ==
- World War I, Adriane Ruggiero, 2003
- Blow in the Draft: Camp Yarns Collected at One of the Great National Army Cantonments by an Amateur War Correspondent, Frazier Hunt, 1918, Doubleday, Page, and Co., pp 372
- The Untold Story of Douglas MacArthur, Frazier Hunt, Devin-Adair Co., 1954
- One American, Frazier Hunt, Simon & Schuster, 1938, "About the author"
- The Batchelor Prince, Frazier Hunt, Harper & Brothers, 1935
