= WVEI (AM) =

WEEI sports radio station in Worcester, Massachusetts, United States

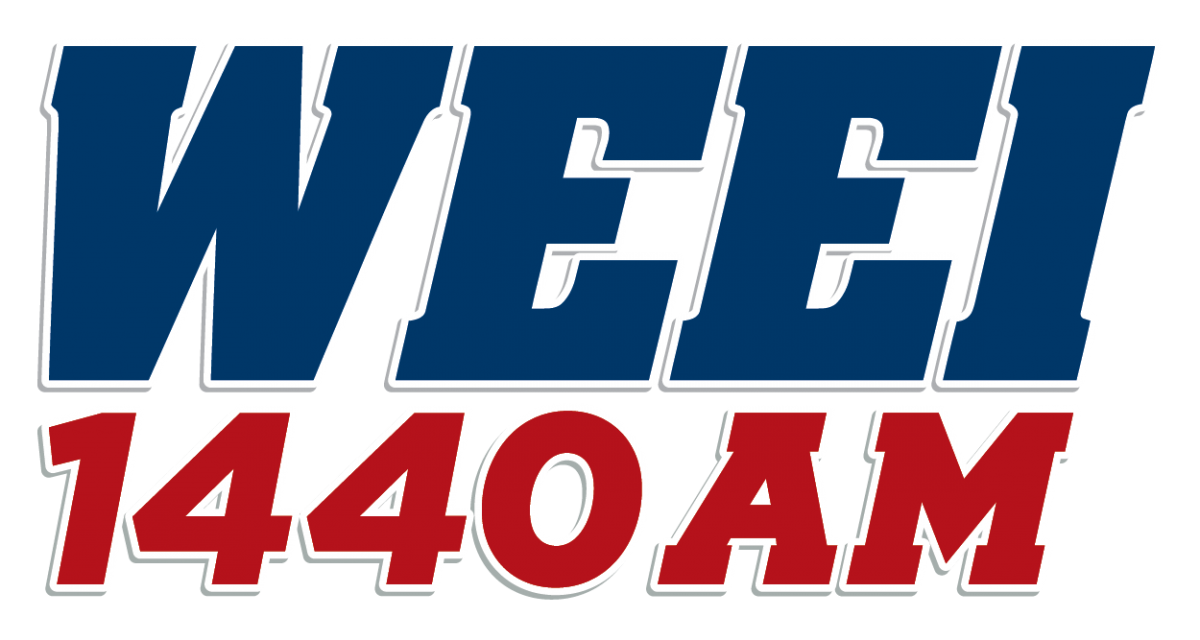
- Worcester, Massachusetts (Note: Originally licensed to Boston; moved to Worcester in 1942.); United States
- Broadcast area: Central Massachusetts
- Frequency: 1440 kHz
- Branding: 1440 WEEI

Programming
- Language: English
- Format: Sports radio
- Affiliations: WEEI Sports Radio Network; Westwood One Sports; Boston Red Sox Radio Network; Boston Bruins Radio Network; Boston Celtics Radio Network; Westwood One

Ownership
- Owner: Audacy, Inc.; (Audacy License, LLC)
- Sister stations: WBGB; WEEI; WEEI-FM; WMJX; WBMX

History
- First air date: February 27, 1927
- Former call signs: WBET (1927–29); WLEX (1929–31); WAAB (1931–76); WNCR (1976–77); WFTQ (1977–91); WVEI (1991–92); WBHT (1992); WVEI (1992–94); WWTM (1994–2000)
- Call sign meaning: phonetically similar to WEEI

Technical information
- Licensing authority: FCC
- Facility ID: 74466
- Class: B
- Power: 5,000 watts
- Transmitter coordinates: 42°17′23.33″N 71°50′46.26″W (NAD83)

Links
- Public license information: Public file; LMS
- Webcast: Listen live (via Audacy)
- Website: www.audacy.com/weei/network/weei-1440-am-worcester-ma

WVEI (1440 kHz) is an AM sports radio station in Worcester, Massachusetts, operating with 5,000 watts. The station is owned by Audacy, Inc. Most programming is provided by Boston sister station WEEI-FM.

The station originated in Boston as the Boston Evening Transcript's WBET, which was licensed in 1926 and signed on in 1927. After the newspaper sold the station, it moved to Lexington as WLEX in 1929; two years later, John Shepard III bought the station and moved it back to Boston as WAAB, a sister station to the Yankee Network's WNAC. Anti-duopoly rules led Shepard to move WAAB to Worcester in 1942, shortly before his sale of the Yankee Network and its stations to General Tire & Rubber. After a series of ownership changes in the 1950s, WAAB became a top 40 station, shifting to news/talk in the 1970s before relaunching in 1976 as WNCR, a news and beautiful music station.

From 1977 until 1991, the station was WFTQ, a full-service station playing adult contemporary music. After simulcasting its FM sister station WAAF for most of 1991, WFTQ became WVEI, a simulcast of the sports radio programming of WEEI (590 AM). A separate sports format was launched in 1994 as WWTM, but the 1996 sale of the station to American Radio Systems (ARS) led to the addition of programming from WEEI (850 AM). Entercom, the predecessor of Audacy, acquired WWTM from CBS in 1998 as part of CBS's purchase of ARS; it changed the call sign back to WVEI in 2000.

== History ==
=== Origins in Boston ===
==== WBET and the second WLEX ====
The station that now operates as WVEI originated in Boston as WBET, the radio station of the Boston Evening Transcript, which was granted a license on December 18, 1926. The station was originally authorized with 100 watts on 780 kHz; however, when the station signed on February 27, 1927, it was operating with 500 watts on 1130 kHz. The inaugural broadcast was plagued by severe technical problems, leading to a front-page apology on the next day's paper, and the station went off-the-air until April 20, when WBET moved to 760 kHz and began operating from studios originally used by WGI.

After moving to 1240 kHz and then back to 1130 kHz in June 1927, the station moved to 1040 kHz on August 15, sharing time with religious station WSSH; on November 11, 1928, the station moved to 1360 kHz, where it shared time with South Dartmouth station WMAF as well as WSSH. The city of license was changed to Medford in February 1928. However, WBET was plagued by continued technical issues and increasing expenses, leading the Transcript to sell the station; on February 15, 1929, it was purchased by the Lexington Air Stations, owner of Lexington radio station WLEX (now WLLH in Lawrence) and experimental television station W1XAY. The new owners moved the station to Lexington and transferred the WLEX call letters from its new sister station (which became WLEY). On March 20, 1930, the station moved to 1410 kHz and was still time-share.

==== The Yankee and Colonial Network ====
WLEX became an affiliate of the Yankee Network on January 20, 1931, and soon thereafter the station moved back to Boston, changing its call letters to WAAB and sharing studios with WNAC (now WBIX) at the Hotel Buckminster at Kenmore Square; by April 20, John Shepard III of Shepard Stores, owner of WNAC and the Yankee Network, had acquired WAAB outright. Shepard had shown interest in the WLEX license as early as the fall of 1929, when he attempted to lease the station and relocate it to Worcester; this plan was rejected by the Federal Radio Commission (FRC) following objections from WTAG. By 1938, WAAB's studios were located at 21 Brookline Avenue.

On January 26, 1937, the ownership of WAAB and WNAC was consolidated under the Yankee Network, Inc. As a result of the NARBA frequency shift, WAAB moved to 1440 kHz on March 29, 1941.

=== Move to Worcester ===
In late 1942, Shepard moved WAAB to Worcester to avoid anti-duopoly rules. Though this gave Shepard his long-desired Worcester station, the move was soon followed by the sale of the Yankee Network to General Tire & Rubber. As early as 1948, the station was broadcasting with 5,000 watts.

The Yankee Network leased WAAB, along with WMTW in Portland, Maine, to Radio Enterprises, Inc. in 1949. A year later, Bruff W. Olin, Jr., who previously owned WQUA in Moline, Illinois, bought WAAB for $100,000, with $85,000 being paid to the Yankee Network and Radio Enterprises receiving $15,000. Olin then sold the station to George F. and Kathleen Wilson for $160,000 in 1952, marking Wilson Enterprises' return to station ownership after having sold WCNT in Centralia, Illinois, earlier in the year. Waterman Broadcasting, controlled by Bernard and Edith Waterman, acquired WAAB for $163,000 in 1956. On June 15, 1961, WAAB started an FM sister station, WAAB-FM, which later became WAAF and is now WKVB.

In the 1950s and 1960s, "14-40 WAAB" was a top-40 radio station. In 1965, the "Fun-in-the-Sun Guys" were Bill Garcia, Chuck Spencer, Don Stevens and Bob Carrigan Morning man Steven Capen recalls the station then and how Atlantic Records purchased it and changed things around in 1967:

I was doing the morning show at WAAB in Worcester, my very first stint in rock & roll radio and in a metropolitan market. My first air name, in fact, Stephen Kane. A lot of firsts. Best of all I was given plenty of latitude. At this point I was so engrossed in my new work I was completely oblivious to the upheaval going on across the country and indeed in radio. A progressive music show—Cream, The Doors, The Mothers of Invention—premiered at night hosted by Jeff Starr while we continued our Ron Landryesque comedy in the A.M. It seems that just like almost all of my gigs the good times weren't to last. Atlantic Records bought the station, and you'd think that would be a good thing, but in came the consultants from New York and Washington, the air sound was tightened beyond belief, catchy new jingles added, and it wasn't long before their newly-installed PD, Sebastian Tripp, gave me my walking papers.

In the early 1970s, under the ownership of George Gray, WAAB began to shift to a talk format. A local sports talk show, Sportsbeat, was added in the evening with former Boston Bruins TV voice, Don Earle. Bob Merman, who later had a laryngectomy from throat cancer and did many anti-smoking ads, was the political talk show host following Sportsbeat. In the fall of 1971, WAAB replaced the Don Earle show with an ambitious nightly news block to 7:00 pm, anchored by Ron Parshley and Mike Cabral. A news correspondent for this program was Paul Del Colle, a senior at Holy Cross, who assumed news anchor duties for the Bob Merman's talk show, which ended at 11:00 pm. Bob Merman was later replaced by the "Wizard of WAAB", the above-named Parshley, a Pagan who did many of his shows on the occult; he died in 2001. Paul Del Colle eventually became a professor of communications and earned his Ph.D. at New York University. Mike Cabral left WAAB to become the news director at WGNG (now WSJW) in Pawtucket, Rhode Island, and continued in various news capacities with radio stations in southeastern Massachusetts for many year after.

About 1972 or 1973, WAAB switched to a full-time news/talk format with the All News Morning Journal and the All-News Afternoon Journal during drive times. Talk show hosts included WSB's Bob Coxe, Kurt Oden (who was an aide to Buddy Cianci), Paul Stanford (now running a gift shop in Naples), Bob Morgan on Sports, Ron Parshley, Alan Michael Rowey, Skip Quillia with Tests and Trivia, Dick Steven's Feminine Forum, Jeff Katz, John Gallager (formerly of Westwood Family Dental and East/West Mortgage), Steve Booth (daytime talk show producer), Mike Marcy, Dave Houle (evening talk show producer and later WFTQ p/t announcer), and Mike Moore (sales guru at WAAF). In the newsroom were Forest Sawyer (later to work for CBS, ABC, and CNBC), Bob Parlante (later to work for WHDH and WSB), Aviva Diamond (later to work for ABC), John Sterns, Dave Brown, and Geoff Metcalfe. In September 1975, WAAB hired Sarah Magaw, its first female talk show host, for the afternoon shift.

On September 11, 1976, WAAB became WNCR (Worcester's News Center). The station's emphasis shifted to news programming, with the entirety of the station's staff being news staff (automated beautiful music was aired during non-drive times). The staff included Bob McMahon (later at WBZ and now at WBUR-FM), News Director Tom Hughes (later at several Atlanta stations), Larry Cohen (afternoon news co-anchor), Sarah (Blanchard) Magaw (afternoon news co-anchor and evening talk show host for "Livewire;" Sarah later went into corporate marketing and is now a novelist and poet), Bob Machson (talk show producer and reporter), Steve D'Agostino (who returned to WFTQ as news director and morning news anchor and later worked for Worcester Magazine, Business Worcester, and Worcester Business Journal), Pam Coulter and Marcia Salter (both subsequently with ABC News Radio), Norm McDonald (formerly of WBZ-TV) on weather, and Greg Gilmartin (later at WTIC) on sports.

The station owner and company president was Robert Williams. Steven Marx was vice president and general manager; Bart Coblentz served as station manager, Barbara Norton was the operations manager; and Jim Muir was account executive.

=== 14Q era ===
By December 1977, WNCR changed call letters to WFTQ and was known as "Fourteen Q" (14Q). The station had a full-service adult contemporary format playing a mix of music from the 1960s, 1970s and 1980s, and weather reports every 20 minutes.

In March 1981, the Katz Agency purchased WFTQ and WAAF from Park City Communications. In 1986 the Katz Agency sold all its radio stations to NewCity Communications. This new company was organized at the time by members of Katz management to purchase all of Katz's radio holdings, under its subsidiary Katz Broadcasting.

During the 1980s, WFTQ was known as "Worcester's Weather Station". As early as 1985, WFTQ was broadcasting in AM stereo using the Kahn system.

During the summer of 1989, NewCity Communications, Inc. sold WFTQ and WAAF to Zapis Communications in exchange for Atlanta station WEKS. WFTQ then underwent restructuring. By 1990, WFTQ called itself "The Sports Channel" and was known for broadcasting live Boston Celtics games.

WFTQ had massive lay-offs, however, and began simulcasting WAAF on January 15, 1991. Over the summer of 1991, general manager John Sutherland cited 18 months of "substantial losses" due to poor advertising sales.

=== Switch to sports ===
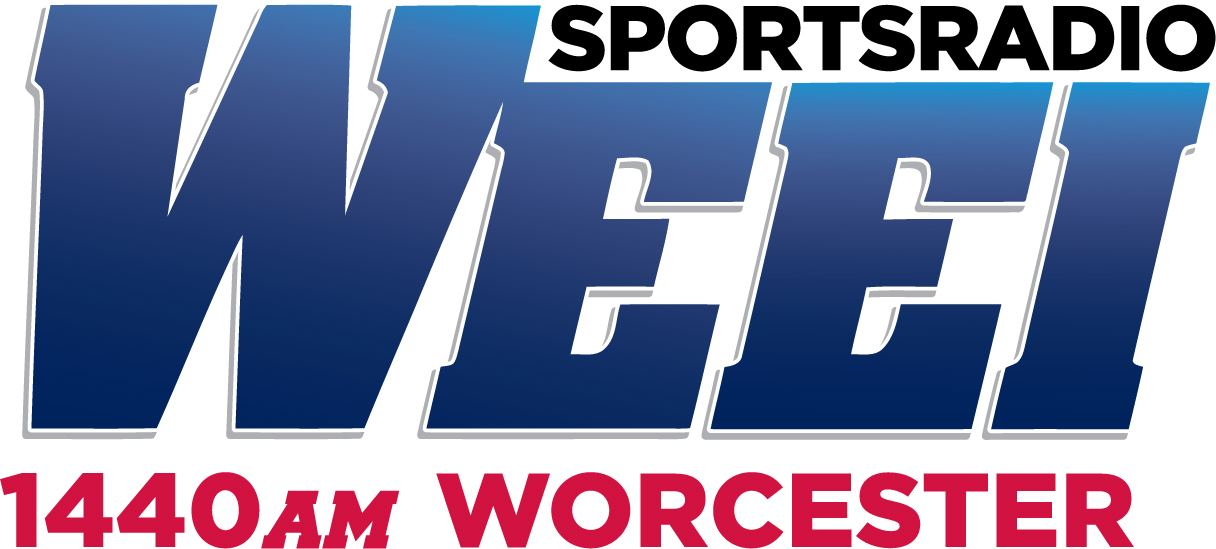
Former logo of the radio station

On September 3, 1991, WFTQ changed its call letters to WVEI and began simulcasting WEEI (590 AM), a sports-talk station in Boston. Although WEEI supplied the majority of the station's programming, WVEI would break away from the WEEI simulcast for local weekend morning public affairs programming and broadcasts of Holy Cross football and basketball.

On October 10, 1994, WVEI changed calls to WWTM and was known as "Worcester's Team". It briefly had a locally based sports format. At the time, station chief engineer Eric Fitch wrote, "We have just recently changed our call sign from WVEI to WWTM, effective October 1, 1994. Prior to that we simulcast WEEI from Boston. With their move to the old WHDH frequency of 850 kHz, we found we would be better off programming the station ourselves with IMUS in the Morning, The Fabulous Sports Babe Mid days, Kiley and the Coach 2P to 6P, Dan Miller 6P to 10P and Ron Barr with sports By-Line USA overnight. We also feature Holy Cross Football and Basketball, Giants Football, Bruins Hockey (when they actually play a game), and selected games from the Mutual network."

On July 31, 1996, Zapis Communications announced it was selling both WWTM and WAAF to American Radio Systems (ARS) for $24.8 million. At that time, ARS also owned WEEI (850 AM), and within a year some WEEI programming was restored to WWTM. On August 13, 1998, David Field's Entercom purchased most of ARS's Boston-market stations, as well as WWTM, for $65 million from CBS as part of an anti-trust settlement from CBS's purchase of ARS.

WWTM discontinued most of its remaining independent programming in favor of WEEI's in late 2000 and the station was reverted to the WVEI call letters on August 8, 2000.

== Notes ==
Preceded by 1230 WNAC; 1926–1938	Radio Home of the Boston Red Sox; 1939–1942 (as WAAB; split with 1260 WNAC, 1942)	Succeeded by 1260 WNAC; 1942–1946
