= WEZE =

Religious radio station in Boston

- Boston, Massachusetts; United States
- Broadcast area: Greater Boston
- Frequency: 590 kHz
- Branding: 590 AM The Word

Programming
- Language: English
- Format: Christian radio
- Affiliations: Salem Radio Network

Ownership
- Owner: Salem Media Group; (Salem Communications Holding Corporation)
- Sister stations: WROL

History
- First air date: September 29, 1924
- Former call signs: WEEI (1924–94); WBNW (1994–97)
- Former frequencies: 990 kHz (1924–25); 630 kHz (1925–26); 800 kHz (1926–27); 860 kHz (1927); 670 kHz (1927); 820 kHz (1927)
- Call sign meaning: Taken from the former WEZE (1260 AM), now WBIX

Technical information
- Licensing authority: FCC
- Facility ID: 3594
- Class: B
- Power: 5,000 watts (unlimited)
- Transmitter coordinates: 42°24′24.35″N 71°5′12.19″W

Links
- Public license information: Public file; LMS
- Webcast: Listen live; Listen live (via Audacy)
- Website: wezeradio.com

WEZE (590 AM) – branded 590 AM The Word – is a commercial Christian radio station licensed to Boston, Massachusetts, serving Greater Boston and much of surrounding New England. Owned by Salem Communications, WEZE is the Boston affiliate for the Salem Radio Network. The WEZE studios are located in the Boston suburb of North Quincy, and the station transmitter resides in neighboring Medford. Besides a standard analog transmission, WEZE is available online.

== History ==
=== WEEI (1924–1994) ===
==== Early years ====
It is the aim of the officials of WEEI to make the station individual and original. Although WEAF of New York has been borne in mind while the plans were being made, the Edison Light Station will not be copied from WEAF. It is intended to make the station outstanding in the broadcasting field.

— Lloyd C. Greene, profiling WEEI's forthcoming launch

The Edison Electric Illuminating Company of Boston built and signed on this station as the first incarnation of WEEI, from which the call sign was derived. The electric company established WEEI as a public relations vehicle and extensively promoted the new venture weeks before launching, highlighting the usage of the latest and most advanced radio equipment. A Boston Globe profile specifically cited AT&T's success with WEAF as Edison Light's inspiration for WEEI; while the company stressed that WEEI would not be a direct copy of WEAF, WEEI agreed to simulcast programming from the New York station via a direct phone line. WEEI's debut on September 29, 1924, included a four-hour commencement program including a dedicatory address from Edison Light president Charles L. Edgar, in addition to live classical music selections, operating at 303 meters (990 kHz) with 500 watts of power. WEEI's alliance with WEAF included airing the New York station's coverage of the 1924 World Series, headlined by Graham McNamee. WJAR in Providence, Rhode Island, was added to the simulcast, while WNAC suspended operations during the games to avoid any potential interference.

The station broadcast on various frequencies over the next several years, settling on 590 kHz in 1927. In 1926, WEEI became a charter member of the NBC Red Network and remained an NBC Red affiliate until 1936, when the station was leased by CBS and became an affiliate of that network. CBS bought WEEI outright from Boston Edison on August 31, 1942. An FM sister station, WEEI-FM (103.3 FM, now WBGB), went on the air in 1948.

Until 1960, WEEI, through CBS Radio, was the last Boston radio station to devote a large amount of its program schedule to "traditional" network radio programming of daytime soap operas, comedy shows, variety shows, and similar fare.

For the remainder of the 1960s, WEEI was New England's first talk radio station (though the station also played middle-of-the-road music) and home of such hosts as Howard Nelson, Jim Westover and of Paul Benzaquin, one of the most popular radio talk show hosts in Boston history. In the 1960s, the daily WEEIdea feature presented cleaning and cooking tips from housewives.

==== Talk and all-news years ====
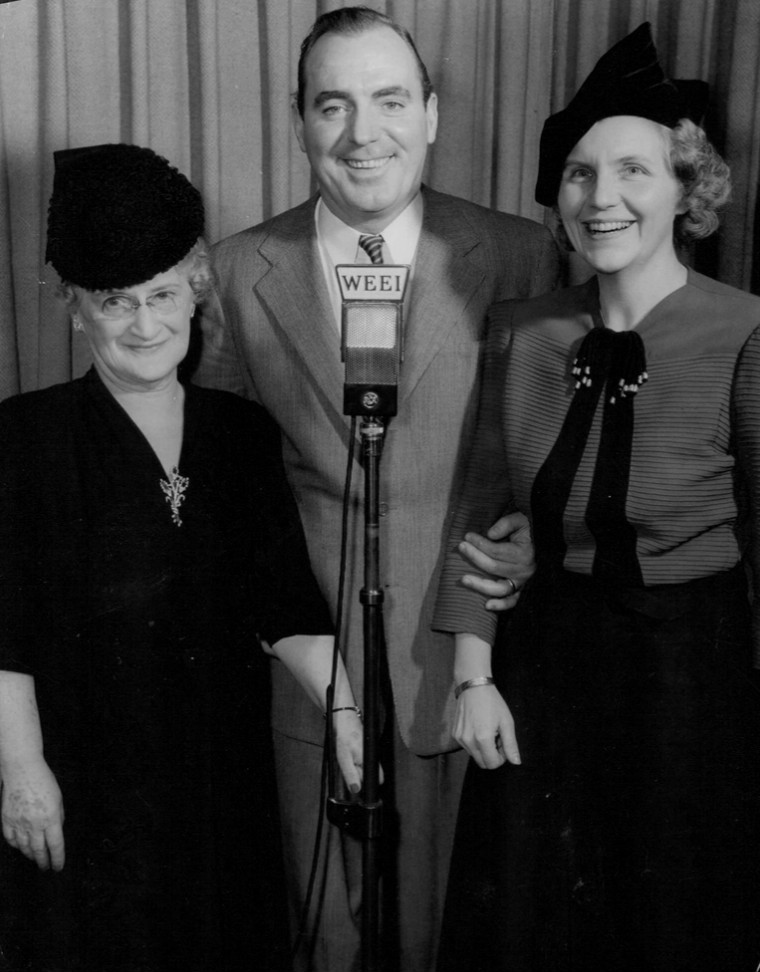
Actor Pat O'Brien was a guest on the WEEI program "Hollywood Snapshots" in 1942.

By May 1972, WEEI had six full days of call-in talk programming. On weekdays, morning drive time from 6 am to 10 am was hosted by newsman Len Lawrence (Leonard Libman), followed by Ellen Kimball from 10 am to 2 pm. Kimball was hired from WIOD in Miami, where she had replaced broadcaster Larry King after he was arrested on December 20, 1971. Ellen is believed to be one of the first women to host a daily, four-hour, call-in talk show, six days a week. Originally called Boston Forum with Ellen Kimball, the name was eventually changed to The Ellen Kimball Show. Later, newsman Ben Farnsworth took over the Saturday call-in segment from 10 am to 2 pm. Paul Benzaquin handled 2 pm to 6 pm weekdays.

Although its talk radio format was popular, the station went all-news in 1974, following the lead of several other CBS-owned stations. At first, WEEI was not 24/7 all-news; the station's late-night schedule featured the CBS Radio Mystery Theater, an attempt to revive radio drama, as well as a local overnight talk show with Bruce Lee (no relation to the martial-arts actor), a holdover from the previous format. But by the end of the 1970s, WEEI was all-news around the clock.

On December 27, 1977, while engaged in traffic reporting, a Hughes 269B helicopter operated by WEEI lost power and crashed into an apartment building in Quincy while attempting an emergency landing, killing pilot Richard Banks and reporter Chip Whitmore. A fire developed in the building following the crash.

WEEI was put up for sale in April 1983, after CBS reached a deal to acquire KRLD in Dallas–Fort Worth from Metromedia; that September, a deal was reached to sell the station to Helen Broadcasting; the company was owned by the Valerio family, who also owned Papa Gino's. Although Metromedia canceled the sale of KRLD after it was granted permission to own both the radio station and KNBN-TV in Dallas–Fort Worth, the sale of WEEI still went forward. Helen Broadcasting continued the all-news format. CBS retained WEEI's FM sister station until the 2017 sale of its radio division to Entercom.

==== Switch to sports ====
The station was acquired by Boston Celtics Communications (a group that shared ownership with the Boston Celtics basketball team) on May 10, 1990; the Celtics also simultaneously purchased WFXT (channel 25) from Fox Television Stations. The Celtics initially pledged to continue the all-news format, hiring a new morning anchor that August and shifting the station to a 30-minute clock (it previously followed a one-hour clock). However, the CBS Radio Network's decision to end its 54-year link with WEEI and shift its Boston affiliation to WRKO effective September 3, 1990, for reasons that included WRKO having a stronger news commitment, led to speculation that the station was shifting to an all-sports format, even as WEEI replaced CBS with the ABC Direction Network.

Though the format change speculation was played down by station officials, WEEI, which had already carried Celtics broadcasts since 1987, expanded its sports programming after the sale; WEEI became the flagship station of the Boston Bruins (replacing WPLM-FM) in 1990 (however, Celtics broadcasts were given priority, resulting in some Bruins broadcasts moving to WVBF or WMEX), and a nightly sports talk show with Craig Mustard was launched on August 20, 1990. WEEI also carried Sports Byline USA and CBS Radio Sports broadcasts not cleared by WRKO. The all-news format continued in other dayparts until September 3, 1991, when WEEI became an all-sports station. Following the format change, the station began simulcasting its programming on WVEI in Worcester to reach central Massachusetts.

Upon the change to all-sports, WEEI featured the Andy Moes show and Glenn (Ordway) and Janet (Prensky), a short-lived experiment in bringing a "Bickersons"-type format to sports radio. Also part of the roster was Boston sports talk pioneer Eddie Andelman. WEEI also began to carry Boston College Eagles football in 1992, replacing WBZ. However, the change was followed by a dramatic drop in its ratings; additionally, the station struggled financially, at one point losing $80,000 a week, leading to rumors of a sale of WEEI. Still, WEEI improved its morning ratings after it became one of the earliest affiliates of Imus in the Morning from WFAN in New York City on July 12, 1993.

On March 16, 1994, the Boston Celtics reached a deal to sell WEEI to Back Bay Broadcasters; shortly afterward, the rights to Celtics broadcasts passed to American Radio Systems (ARS), owner of WRKO and WHDH, effective with the 1994–95 season, while the Bruins signed a deal with WBZ to carry its broadcasts starting in 1995. Sister station WFXT was sold back to Fox Television Stations soon afterward.

=== WBNW (1994–1996) ===
ARS then announced on August 15, 1994, that it would purchase the programming and call letters of WEEI from Back Bay Broadcasters, effective August 29. As part of this transfer, WHDH's call letters were changed to WEEI and its format was changed from talk radio to sports radio, with on- and off-air personnel also being reassigned; 590 AM's call letters were concurrently changed to WBNW. WBNW simulcast the "new" WEEI for a week before Back Bay Broadcasters launched a business news format. The ownership transfer also saw WVEI break from its simulcast of WEEI to become a separate sports radio station for Worcester, WWTM; WWTM was acquired by ARS in 1996 and gradually returned to a simulcast of WEEI, returning to the WVEI call sign in 2000.

As a business news station, WBNW's programming was mostly supplied by Bloomberg; the station was the first affiliate of Bloomberg Radio, which had previously only aired on its New York City flagship station, WBBR. Local news segments were outsourced to Metro Networks. WBNW's lineup also included a local talk show, The Money Experts, and Bruce Williams' syndicated talk show; both programs previously aired on WHDH.

WBNW also carried Boston Bruins games during the 1994–95 season; the games did not move with WEEI to 850 AM due to conflicts with Boston College basketball. In 1995, Peter Ottmar, who ran Back Bay Broadcasters, consolidated his broadcast holdings, which also included WARA in Attleboro, WWKX in Woonsocket, Rhode Island, and WICE in Pawtucket, Rhode Island, under the Back Bay name; that July, WICE was relaunched as WPNW, which largely simulcast WBNW but featured its own Metro Networks-produced local inserts for the Providence market.

=== WEZE (1996–present) ===
American Radio Systems, which had held an option to buy WBNW since its launch, traded this option to Salem Communications in 1996 in exchange for KDBX in Banks, Oregon. While WBNW initially announced that "there will be no change of owner" and that "as far as Peter Ottmar is concerned, no one has an option on the station", Salem exercised this option to purchase the station in December 1996. As part of this transaction, that December 15, Salem changed WBNW's call letters to WEZE and changed the station's format to Christian radio; in effect, this new WEZE licensed to Boston became the successor to the previous WEZE (1260 AM) licensed to Boston. Concurrently, the previous WEZE changed its call letters to WPZE, and, after both simulcasting WEZE and airing a separate Christian format, was later divested (and became WMKI).

WADN (1120 AM) in Concord started adding financial programming in 1997, eventually changing its format to business news/talk entirely; WADN's call letters were changed to WBNW in December 1998 – a move to reinforce that station format's link to the former WBNW. Incidentally, a format similar to WBNW's was installed onto 1260 AM, renamed WBIX, in September 2015 after Salem reacquired the frequency.

==== WEZE-FM ====
For a short period, Salem Communications operated WEZE-FM in Pittsburgh, Pennsylvania, billed as "Easy 104.7". Though unusual, FCC rules allow co-owned stations in different cities to share call letters between themselves. Salem purchased the Pittsburgh station as part of a strategic move to compete against a Christian-formatted AM/FM competitor, but would have to run another format until the contracts with the client ministries could be obtained. Salem chose to run an easy-listening format until the contracts were obtained in October 1991, when WEZE-FM evolved into WORD-FM.
