= WGTR (Massachusetts) =

Radio station in Massachusetts, United States (1939–1953)

- Worcester, Massachusetts; United States

Ownership
- Owner: Shepard Stores; General Tire-Teleradio; (General Teleradio, Inc.)

History
- First air date: July 24, 1939
- Last air date: July 24, 1953
- Former call signs: W1XOJ (1939–1941); W43B (1941–1943); WGTR (1943–1953)
- Call sign meaning: General Tire and Rubber

WGTR was a pioneer commercial FM radio station, which was the first of two mountain-top stations established by the Yankee Network. It began regular programming, as experimental station W1XOJ, in 1939. In 1941 it was licensed for commercial operation from studios in Boston, initially with the call sign W43B, which was changed to WGTR in 1943. In 1947, its designated community of license was changed to Worcester, Massachusetts.

During the station's entire existence, its transmitter site was located atop Asnebumskit Hill near Paxton, Massachusetts. WGTR was deleted in July 1953.

== History ==
=== Experimental broadcasts ===
In 1947 WGTR, then licensed to Boston, and WMNE, atop Mount Washington in New Hampshire, were the two "Yankee FM Stations", but both were gone by 1953.

In the 1930s, investigations were begun into establishing radio stations transmitting on very high frequency (VHF) assignments above 30 MHz, well above those used by the standard AM broadcast band. These stations were informally known as "Apex" stations, because their coverage tended to be limited to line-of-sight distances, so there was a premium in locating transmitter towers at high altitudes. The Yankee Network, a regional network of AM radio stations located in the northeastern United States, began its own investigation of the potential for operation on the new frequencies. In late 1935, it was issued a license for an experimental station, W1XER, originally located in Boston. In early 1936 three Yankee Network engineers attended a demonstration by Edwin Howard Armstrong of his recent invention of "wide-band frequency modulation" (FM) transmissions. In 1937 a plan was developed envisioning that 90% of New England could be provided with FM programs by building a 50-kilowatt station on a mountaintop at Paxton (Mount Asnebumskit), plus 5-kilowatt stations on Mount Washington in New Hampshire and on Mount Mansfield in Vermont. (Later plans dropped the proposed Mount Mansfield station.)

A construction permit for W1XOJ was granted on August 18, 1937, although construction did not start until August 1938. The station began broadcasting with a regular daily schedule of 8 a.m. to midnight on July 24, 1939, transmitting on 43.0 MHz with 2,000 watts. Programming was relayed from the studios of the Yankee Network's AM station in Boston, WNAC, to the transmitter site 42 miles (68 km) away by an FM relay station, W1XOK, transmitting on 133.03 MHz with 250 watts. In August 1939, W1XOJ was reported to be one of only four FM facilities "in actual operation". It was also described as "the first commercial station to be built outside of Major Armstrong's own transmitter, W2XMN at Alpine, New Jersey". In early 1940, it was reported that a 50-kilowatt transmitter had been installed but was currently operating at only 30 kilowatts, as a January 15, 1940 wind storm had destroyed the station's 400-foot (120 m) antenna.

The Yankee Network inaugurated the first FM radio network in the United States, beginning with a January 4, 1940 demonstration of an FM over-the-air inter-city relay, which originated in Yonkers, New York, and was received and relayed in turn by Armstrong's W2XMN in Alpine, New Jersey; W1XPW in Hartford, Connecticut; and then to W1XOJ. Yankee's FM network officially made its debut in December 1940 when W1XOJ was permanently linked with the Yankee station in New Hampshire, W1XER. Because of their superior audio quality, the FM stations became known for broadcasting live classical music concerts.

=== Commercial operation ===
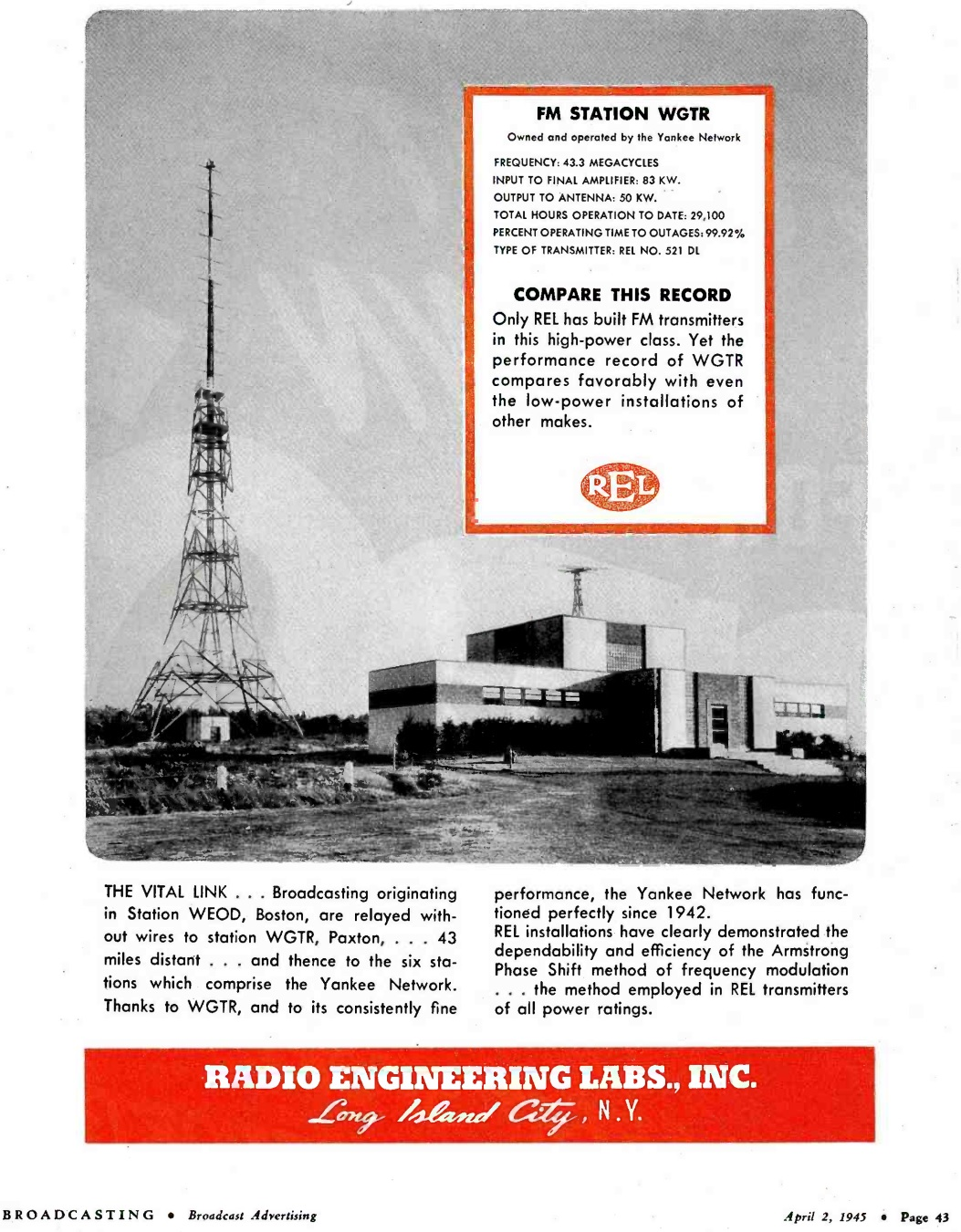
1945 photograph of station studio and tower.

In May 1940, the Federal Communications Commission (FCC) authorized an FM band effective January 1, 1941, operating on 40 channels spanning 42–50 MHz. Yankee was issued a construction permit for a station on 44.3 MHz with studios in Boston that was assigned the call sign W43B, in reference to its location east of the Mississippi River, the last two digits of its frequency (44.3), and B, the one- or two-character city identifier for Boston. Commercial operations commenced on April 29, 1941. Effective November 1, 1943, the FCC modified its policy for FM call letters, and the call sign was changed to WGTR, for "General Tire and Rubber", as the General Tire & Rubber Company had purchased the Yankee Network in late 1942.

The Yankee Network's two mountain FMs also found national defense utility during World War II. WGTR and WMTW atop Mount Washington, New Hampshire, remained on the air for nearly all of the war in their air raid warning capacity, covering New England.

On June 27, 1945, the FCC announced the reassignment of the FM band to 80 channels from 88–106 MHz, which was later expanded to 88-108 MHz. WGTR's initial assignment on the new "high" FM band was 103.1 MHz, which was later changed to 99.1 MHz. Stations were given permission to operate simultaneously on both their original "low-band" and new "high-band" assignments until the end of 1948. In 1947, WGTR's community of license was changed from Boston to Worcester, Massachusetts, although it continued to broadcast from atop Mount Asnebumskit. This cleared the way for the Yankee Network to establish a new Boston FM station, WNAC-FM, when the FCC ruled that although there was some coverage overlap between WGTR and WNAC-FM, this did not violate its "duopoly" prohibition, because Boston and Worcester were considered to be "distinct cities".

In December 1951, Frederick W. Muckenhoupt, a station employee, stole $2,100 worth of equipment from the station. He was laid off from WGTR but escaped arrest and was hired at station WSTC in Stamford, Connecticut. However, Muckenhoupt was caught in 1953 tapping his boss's phone using some of the stolen WGTR equipment and apprehended by Connecticut state police.

In October 1948, the Yankee Network had shut down its second pioneer mountaintop FM station, WMNE (the former WMTW). WGTR followed five years later and was deleted on July 24, 1953.
