= WMNE (FM) =

FM radio station (1940–1948)

WMNE was a pioneer commercial FM radio station, which was the second of two mountain-top broadcasting stations established by the Yankee Network. It began regular programming, as experimental station W1XER, in December 1940. In 1941 it was licensed for commercial operation from studios in Boston, initially with the call sign W39B, which was changed to WMTW in 1943. In late 1946 the station's designated community of license was changed to Portland, Maine, and its call letters became WMNE.

WMNE was deleted in October 1948. During the station's entire existence its transmitter site was located at the summit of Mount Washington in Sargent's Purchase, New Hampshire.

== History ==
=== Experimental broadcasts ===
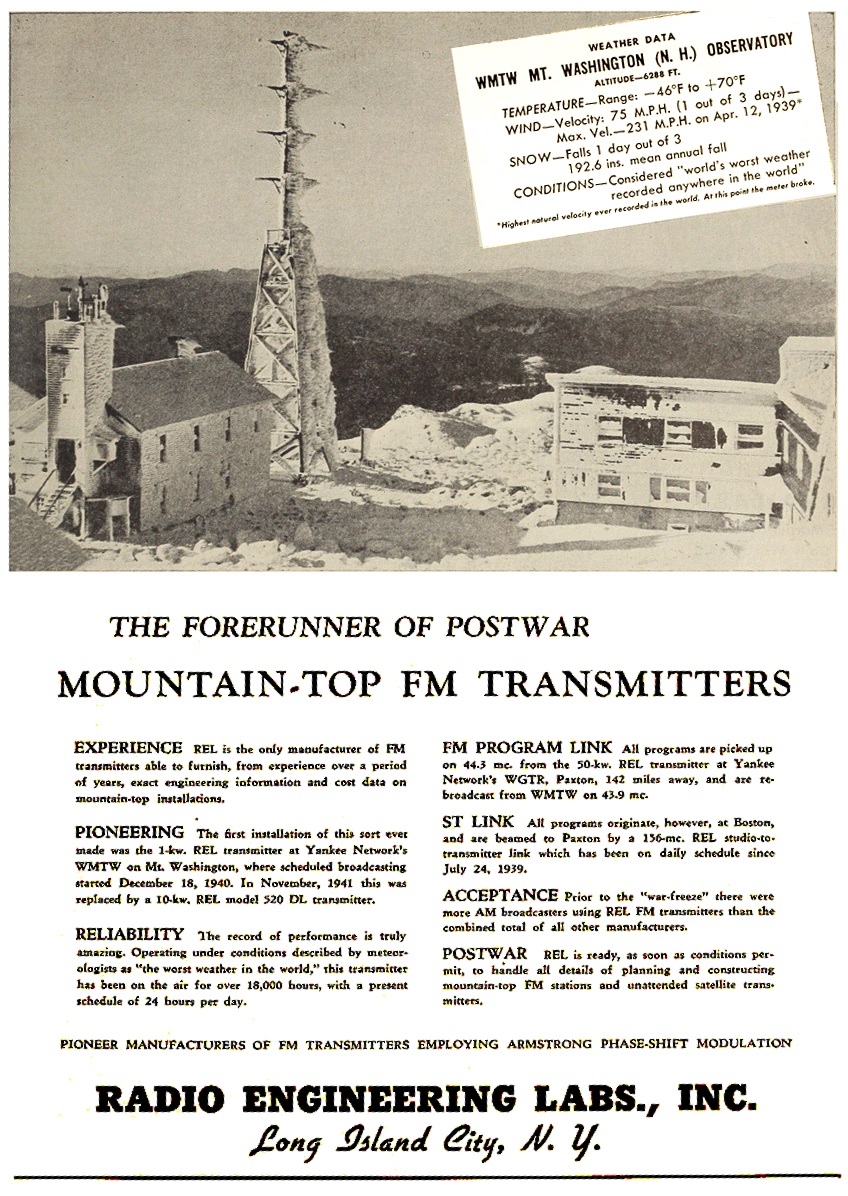
1944 advertisement showcasing the harsh conditions atop Mount Washington.

In 1947 WMNE and WGTR in Boston were the two "Yankee FM Stations", but both were gone by 1953.

In the 1930s investigations were begun into establishing radio stations transmitting on "Very High Frequency" (VHF) assignments above 30 MHz, well above those used by the standard AM broadcast band. These stations were informally known as "Apex" stations, because their coverage tended to be limited to line-of-site distances, so there was a premium in locating transmitter towers at high altitudes.

The Yankee Network, a regional network of AM radio stations located in the northeastern United States, began its own investigation of the potential for operation on the new frequencies. In late 1935 it was issued a license for an experimental station, W1XER, originally located in Boston. In early 1936 three Yankee Network engineers attended a demonstration by Edwin Howard Armstrong of his recent invention of "wide-band frequency modulation" (FM) transmissions. In 1937 a plan was developed envisioning that 90% of New England could be provided with FM programs by building a 50 kilowatt station on a mountain top at Paxton, Massachusetts (Mount Asnebumskit), plus 5 kilowatt stations on Mount Washington in New Hampshire and on Mount Mansfield in Vermont. (Later plans dropped the proposed Mount Mansfield station). This also proposed converting W1XER from AM transmissions to FM.

In order to provide better coverage, in 1937 W1XER was moved from Boston to the top of Mount Washington, where it was used as a link to report meteorological information from a weather observatory located there. The process of converting the station for FM broadcasting turned out to be an arduous undertaking, and W1XER did not start broadcast programming on a regular schedule until December 19, 1940. The Yankee Network inaugurated the first FM radio network in the United States, which officially made its debut in December 1940 when W1XER was permanently linked to over-the-air transmissions from W1XOJ in Massachusetts. Because of their superior audio quality, the FM stations became known for broadcasting live classical music concerts.

=== Commercial operation ===
In May 1940, the Federal Communications Commission (FCC) announced the establishment, effective January 1, 1941, of an FM radio band operating on 40 channels spanning 42–50 MHz. On October 31, 1940, the FCC awarded the first fifteen construction permits for commercial FM stations, including one for 43.9 MHz to the Yankee Network for operation from atop Mount Washington, which was issued the call sign W39B. (Note: The initial policy for commercial FM station call signs included an initial "W" for commercial stations located east of the Mississippi River, followed by the last two digits of a station's frequency assignment, "39" in this case, and closing with a one or two character community identifier, which for stations serving the Boston region was "B".) Commercial operation commenced on April 5, 1941, with an initial station rate card of $25 per hour daytime, and $50 per hour nighttime.

Effective November 1, 1943, the FCC modified its policy for FM call signs, and the call sign was changed to WMTW. In December 1946, the station's frequency was changed 43.9 to 45.1 MHz. On June 27, 1945, the FCC announced the reassignment of the FM band to 80 channels from 88 to 106 MHz, which was later expanded to 88-108 MHz. WMTW's initial assignment on the new "high" FM band was 98.1 MHz, which was later changed to 100.5 MHz. Stations were given permission to operate simultaneously on both their original "low band" and new "high band" assignments until the end of 1948.

In late 1946 the Yankee Network established a new AM station on 1490 kHz in Portland, Maine. This new station was given the WMTW call sign and the Mount Washington FM station's callsign was changed to WMNE. In addition, WMNE's community of license was changed from Boston to Portland.

In October 1948 WMNE's license was unexpectedly turned in for immediate cancellation. Television Digest, while noting that "Yankee gave no reasons" for shutting down the station, opined that "but it is well known that: (1) Yankee has sunk some $2 million into FM, with literally almost no return. (2) WMNE's rugged location made it terribly expensive to build and operate. (3) Yankee feels FCC destroyed WMNE's reasons for being (huge coverage) when it moved FM to high band and cut station's power. (4) FM just didn't develop with speed expected." On July 24, 1953, the Yankee Network's first pioneer mountaintop station, WGTR, transmitting from Mount Asnebumskit and licensed to Worcester, Massachusetts, was also deleted.

The WMTW call letters were revived in 1954 for the launch of an unrelated television station. This station is still on the air, although the transmitter was relocated off Mount Washington in 2002. In 1958 a new and also unrelated radio station, WMTW-FM on 94.9 MHz, began operating with a transmitter from atop the mountain. This station is currently WHOM.
