= WBIX =

Portuguese-language radio station in Boston

- Boston, Massachusetts; United States
- Broadcast area: Greater Boston; Providence metropolitan area
- Frequency: 1260 kHz
- Branding: 1260 Nossa Rádio USA

Programming
- Language: Portuguese
- Format: Christian radio
- Network: Nossa Rádio

Ownership
- Owner: International Church of the Grace of God, Inc.

History
- First air date: September 13, 1922
- Former call signs: WNAC (1922–1928); WNAC-WBIS (1928-1933); WNAC (1933-1953); WVDA (1953–1957); WEZE (1957–1997); WPZE (1997–1999); WMKI (1999–2015)
- Former frequencies: 833 kHz (1922–1923); 1080 kHz (1923–1925); 1070 kHz (1925-1927); 700 kHz (1927); 650 kHz (1928–1929); 1230 kHz (1929–1941)

Technical information
- Licensing authority: FCC
- Facility ID: 48403
- Class: B
- Power: 5,000 watts
- Transmitter coordinates: 42°16′28.35″N 71°2′30.18″W

Links
- Public license information: Public file; LMS
- Webcast: Listen live
- Website: nossaradiousa.com

WBIX (1260 kHz), branded Nossa Rádio USA, is a commercial Brazilian Portuguese AM radio station licensed to Boston, Massachusetts, and serving Greater Boston. Owned by the International Church of the Grace of God, the WBIX studios are located in the Boston suburb of Somerville, while the station transmitter is located in Quincy.

== History ==
=== WNAC ===
The station was first licensed, to the Shepard Stores in Boston, on September 13, 1922, with the sequentially assigned call sign WNAC. It was authorized to broadcast on the "entertainment" wavelength of 360 meters (833 kHz), on a timesharing basis with the other local stations. The station was founded through the efforts of John Shepard III. His father, John Shepard Jr., owned a chain of department stores throughout New England, and considered radio broadcasts as providing himself and his stores sufficient publicity to finance his son's venture. The company had previously established WEAN in Providence, Rhode Island, on June 2, 1922.

Prior to WNAC's debut, the Boston store had made regular broadcasts, with an apparently unlicensed operation identified as the "Shepard Radio Station". This gave its first broadcast on August 6, 1922, of a morning religious service originating from the Cathedral Church of St. Paul, which was next door to the store.

On January 4, 1923, using a 100-foot (30 m) antenna connected by a clothesline to the building's roof, WNAC participated in the first radio network broadcast, using a special telephone line connection to simulcast programming originating from the American Telephone and Telegraph Company station, WEAF, in New York City.

On May 13, 1925, Shepard launched a second Boston station, WNAB, which changed its call sign to WASN (Air Shopping News) on February 1, 1927, followed later that year to WBIS (Boston Information Service). This was an early experiment with home shopping by radio, featuring updates from 15 Greater Boston department stores, that aired in regular intervals in addition to pre-recorded and live orchestra music. This station was notable in that the staff announcers and the program director were all female. This station experiment was short-lived due to technical issues, the majority of the station's staff enjoyed continued employment at WNAC. After becoming WBIS, it maintained some of the shopping programming but mixed this with "helpful information and advice" in addition to pre-recorded music; the station operated with limited hours, from 8-10 a.m. and 2-4 p.m. on weekdays. WBIS operations were merged into WNAC in April 1928, and the station call sign changed to the dual call letters of WNAC-WBIS.

In 1927, WNAC became one of the sixteen charter members of the CBS Radio Network, it remained a CBS network affiliate for the next decade. (Note: The other stations were WOR in Newark; WADC in Akron; WAIU in Columbus; WCAO in Baltimore; WCAU in Philadelphia; WEAN in Providence; WFBL in Syracuse; WGHP in Detroit; WJAS in Pittsburgh; WKRC in Cincinnati; WMAK in Buffalo-Lockport; WMAQ in Chicago; WOWO in Fort Wayne; KMOX in St. Louis; and KOIL in Council Bluffs.) The station changed frequencies multiple times, and as of November 11, 1928 implementation of the Federal Radio Commission's (FRC) General Order 40, was assigned to 1230 kHz. In 1929, WNAC moved to new studios inside the Hotel Buckminster, with the entrance on the Brookline Avenue side (21 Brookline Avenue), that location served as the station's home for the next four decades.

Between February 1929 and July 1930, Shepard launched The Yankee Network, with WNAC as its flagship; this was a regional network serving stations throughout New England and was a pioneer in radio news coverage. For many years, the Yankee Network was considered one of the best local/regional radio news operations in the country. The WNAC call letters were transferred in 1953 to a station on 680 AM, which served as the flagship until the network was shut down in 1967.

In 1931, Shepard purchased a second Boston station, WAAB, which became an affiliate of the Mutual Broadcasting System (MBS) in 1935, a year after MBS was formed. He also launched a second regional network, "The Colonial Network", with WAAB as its flagship station. Outside of Boston, Yankee and Colonial programming were usually heard on the same station. Additionally, Colonial carried Mutual programming to its affiliates. Between them, Yankee and Colonial carried home games of the Boston Red Sox and Boston Braves baseball teams as well as the Boston Bruins hockey team.

On May 15, 1933, after the FRC requested that stations using only one of their assigned call letters drop those that were no longer in regular use, the use of WBIS in the dual call sign was eliminated, and the station reverted to just WNAC.

Fred B. Cole, a young announcer who would spend more than 50 years on the air, most of them in Boston at various stations, was hired in 1935. Cole left WNAC for network radio, and returned to Boston at WHDH (850 AM) in 1946. In 1937, WNAC became an NBC Red Network affiliate after losing CBS to WEEI (590 AM). Four years later, the North American Regional Broadcasting Agreement changed WNAC's frequency to 1260 kHz. In 1942, to comply with anti-duopoly regulations established by the Federal Communications Commission (FCC), WAAB was moved to Worcester, about 40 miles (64 km) west of Boston. At the same time, WNAC lost NBC Red Network affiliation to WBZ. With WAAB having been moved out of Boston, WNAC took over the Mutual affiliation. The Colonial Network was also shut down, with Yankee picking up many of its programs; in other parts of New England, however, the only change for some former Colonial programming was in the time periods of these shows.

1947 advertisement for the Yankee Network, with WNAC as the originating station.

In December 1942, the Winter Street Corp., the holding company for Shepard family interests—including WNAC and the Yankee Network—announced it would be sold to The General Tire & Rubber Company for $1.24 million. Winter Street was controlled by trusts set up for two of the children of founder John Shepard Jr.: John Shepard III (general manager of WNAC and Yankee); and Robert Shepard, who managed the family's remaining department store in Providence; the transactions, and the closing of the Shepard Stores location in Boston in 1937, were viewed as a strategy to convert the elder Shepard's assets to cash. John Shepard III remained with the station as general manager under a five-year contract. The son of General Tire president William F. O'Neil, William M. O'Neil, Jr., had already owned and operated WJW (850 AM) in Akron/Cleveland since 1940, but did so independently of his father and the manufacturer.

Later that same month, the FCC approved the transaction after securing an affidavit from General Tire's president that "no better deal" would be offered the tire company to buy "time, facilities and services" on Yankee Network stations, and that General Tire would "never" use its ownership to gain an unfair advertising advantage over competitors. Some 40 years later, the company was forced to exit broadcasting for reasons including illegal reciprocal trade agreements. In addition to WNAC and the two networks, the sale included WEAN, WAAB, WICC in Bridgeport, Connecticut; and experimental FM stations in Paxton, Massachusetts, and Mount Washington, New Hampshire.

In 1947, the FCC denied a request to allow WNAC to move to 1200 kHz and boost its power, using a directional 50,000-watt transmitter.

=== WVDA ===
In May 1953, General Teleradio – then the name for General Tire's broadcasting division – sold WNAC to Vic Diehm and Associates, Inc., for $125,000. At the same time, it bought WLAW (AM 680) and WLAW-FM 93.7, both licensed to Lawrence, Massachusetts, from Hildreth and Rogers for $475,000. General Teleradio then surrendered the 93.7 license, as it retained its existing FM property, WNAC-FM 98.5. On June 17, 1953, General Teleradio changed WLAW's call sign to WNAC and moved 1260 AM's old format there. On- and off-air personnel were reassigned at the same time. In effect, the new WNAC (680 AM) licensed to Lawrence became the successor to the old WNAC (1260 AM) licensed to Boston. For this reason, this transaction is often reckoned as a "move" of WNAC from 1260 to 680. Vic Diehm and Associates subsequently changed 1260 AM's calls to WVDA and launched a new format on the station, using WLAW's former studios in the Hotel Bradford in Boston.

Most of WVDA's programming was from the ABC Radio Network, with some local programming. Among them were a few DJ shows, and for a brief time in the mid-1950s, a three-hour morning news block.

=== WEZE ===
The station was sold in 1957, to Great Trails Broadcasting Corp., owned by former Truman administration Commerce Secretary Charles Sawyer, for $252,000. It became WEZE, an NBC Radio Network affiliate. The station carried most NBC Radio programs, and some local DJ shows featuring softer music.

On October 19, 1959, WEZE began a beautiful music format, branded as "The Wonderful World Of Music", that targeted older listeners. The station programmed music in uninterrupted quarter-hour blocks during the daytime hours (half-hour blocks at night), and continued to serve as Boston's NBC Radio affiliate until 1966. It carried hourly newscasts, some feature programs, special news events, but very little of the network's Monitor weekend service. During the "Wonderful World Of Music" days, live announcers spoke only every fifteen minutes, to run down what had been played during the previous quarter-hour, read commercials, and give weather updates.

In his autobiography, comedian George Carlin describes his experiences as a disc jockey at the station. He was fired after he took the station's news station wagon to New York to buy marijuana, leaving the station unable to cover a prison riot. Carlin wrote that another future comedian, Jack Burns, also worked there as an announcer and newscaster at the station during this time. Although only 5,000 watts, WEZE was one of Boston's top-rated radio stations for most of the 1960s. Then, the beautiful music format made a big splash on FM, diverting listeners from WEZE's AM signal.

For many years, WEZE's studios were located on the ground floor of the Statler Office Building near Boston's Park Square, with a picture window on the corner of St. James and Columbus Avenues, allowing passers-by to see the announcer at work in the studio.

In the fall of 1972, WEZE changed formats to a rock 'n roll oldies sound with live personality DJs. This was tweaked by mid-1973 by program director Steve Hunter and consultant Kent Burkhardt to include current pop/rock hits as well. Known as "Z 1260", WEZE was then in direct competition with established Top 40 AM stations WRKO (the former WNAC), WMEX (1510 AM), and WVBF (105.7 FM). Perhaps the best-known announcer during this period was Alan Colmes, who replaced Chuck Kelly in the morning drive slot and who later co-hosted a talk show with Sean Hannity on cable TV's Fox News Channel. In March 1974, WEZE's format was modified again to a more MOR/personality approach.

From August 1975 until early 1977, WEZE tried "The Wonderful World Of Music" again (which was often branded "The Easiest Sound In Town" in newspaper ads, billboards, and television commercials). Since FM radios still were not widespread in automobiles, station management hoped that people who would listen to easy-listening FM stations like WJIB (96.9 FM) at home or work would listen to WEZE on their AM-only car radios while driving. The revival met with very little success, as the audience for "beautiful music" had largely moved to FM.

In early 1977, WEZE became one of the first stations to program what might now be called adult album alternative. This format, promoted as "AlbuM 1260" (stylized to denote its frequency as "AM 1260"), continued until the 1978 sale of the station to New England Continental Media.

New England Continental Media, which eventually became the Salem Media Group, instituted a religious format. Initially, WEZE's religious programming consisted of contemporary Christian music, Christian features, teaching, and preaching; half of the station's schedule was devoted to music. While a religious station, the station continued to operate commercially. By the mid 1980s, local Christian talk shows replaced some of the hours of weekday music programming. In later years, more teaching programs were added to replace the remaining weekday music hours; after 1984, WEZE only played inspirational music on weekends for a few hours.

=== Later years ===
Salem exercised an option to acquire WBNW (590 AM) in the fall of 1996, and that December, began a simulcast that resulted in WEZE's call sign and programming moving to 590 kHz. Following a simulcast on both frequencies, 1260 become WPZE "Praise 1260" on March 3, 1997. The Praise 1260 format included programs that Salem lacked the time to air on WEZE, along with about six hours a day of rhythmic Christian music. This consisted of upbeat praise and worship church music, gospel, and soft AC Christian cuts.

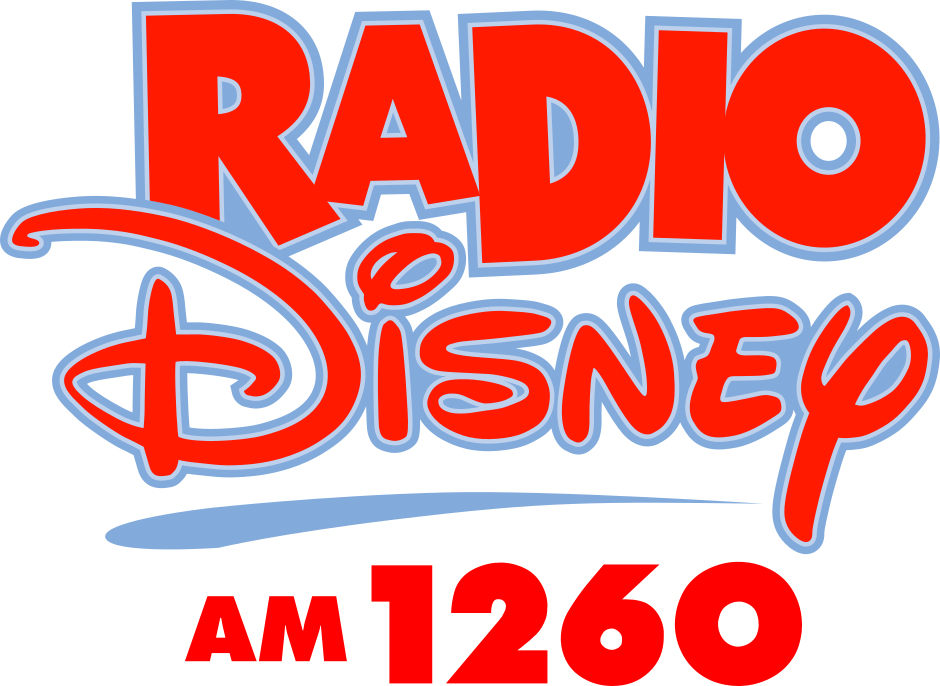
WMKI logo used from 2002 until 2007.

However, in July, Salem sold the station to Hibernia Broadcasting, which switched it to Radio Disney on November 21. (The Praise 1260 format was dropped earlier in that fall in preparation for the sale, and in the interim, WPZE returned to simulcasting WEZE). The station changed its call sign to WMKI on December 10, 1999, and was sold in a group deal to ABC Radio, the owner of Radio Disney, in 2000.

On August 13, 2014, Disney put WMKI and 22 other Radio Disney stations up for sale, to focus on digital distribution of the Radio Disney network. On June 5, 2015, Disney filed to sell WMKI back to Salem Media Group for $500,000. Upon retaking control, Salem changed WMKI to WBIX, call letters that had previously been used on 1060 AM from 2001 to 2010. The FCC approved the sale on August 4. As a result, the station discontinued its affiliation with Radio Disney. It went silent from August 12 to 15. The sale was completed on September 10, 2015 and the station went silent again in anticipation at midnight on September 4 until September 14. WBIX then changed to a conservative talk radio format, a format Salem had programmed in the market on WTTT (1150 AM) from 2003 to 2008.

WBIX was branded as "The Buzz", although many of Salem's other conservative talk stations are branded as "The Answer". It carried syndicated talk shows from the Salem Radio Network, including Hugh Hewitt, Mike Gallagher, Michael Medved, Larry Elder, Eric Metaxas, and Dennis Prager, and business programs, including Ray Lucia from the Business Talk Radio Network. Weekends included repeats of weekday shows, as well as "Money Talk" with Bob Brinker and a travel show with Rudy Maxa. News at the beginning of each hour came from Townhall and Salem Radio News (SRN).

On January 3, 2018, Salem agreed to sell WBIX to the International Church of the Grace of God for $685,000; the new owners began programming the station under a local marketing agreement on January 8. At that time, the station changed to a Portuguese language format, branded "Nossa Rádio USA". Nossa Rádio's programming had been heard on WMVX (1570 AM) prior to 2017. The sale was completed on June 20, 2018.
