= Greater Boston =

Metropolitan Statistical Area in the US

Greater Boston Boston-Cambridge-Newton, MA-NH Metropolitan Statistical Area
- Metropolitan statistical area
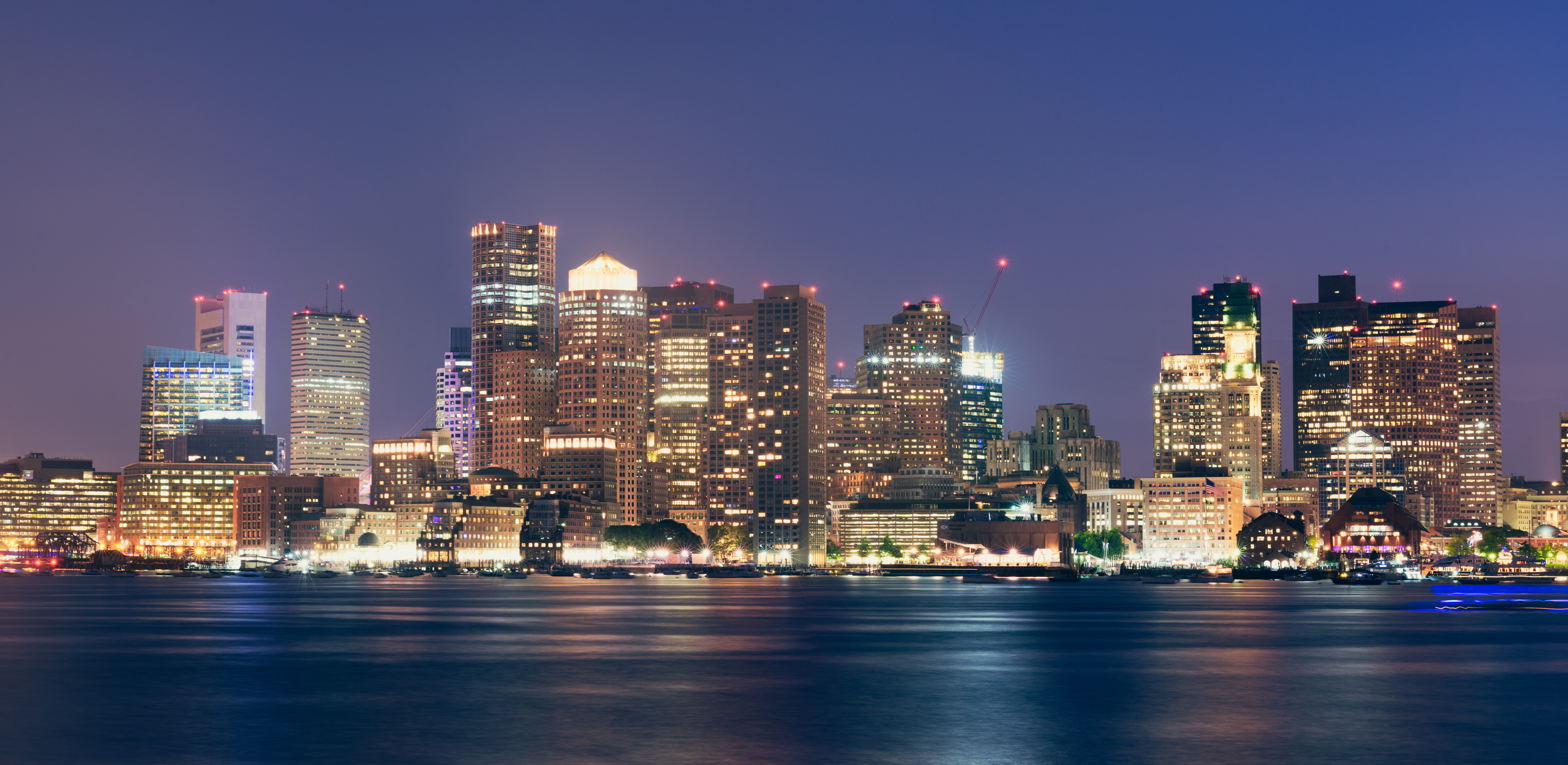
- Boston in July 2015
Interactive Map of Boston–Worcester–Providence, MA–RI–NH CSA
City of Boston
Boston–Cambridge–Newton, MA–NH MSA
Boston, MA Metropolitan Division
Cambridge–Newton–Framingham, MA
Rockingham County–Strafford County, NH
Other Statistical Areas in Boston CSA
Providence–Warwick, RI–MA MSA
Worcester, MA MSA
Manchester–Nashua, NH MSA
Barnstable Town, MA MSA
Concord, NH MSA
Laconia, NH MSA
- Country: United States
- State: Massachusetts; New Hampshire; Rhode Island
- Principal cities: Boston; Worcester; Providence; Cambridge; Manchester; Lowell; Brockton; Quincy; Lynn; New Bedford

Population (2024)
  - Total: 8,493,824 (CSA); 4,941,632 (MSA)
  - Rank: Ranked 7th in the US for Combined Statistical Areas; Ranked 11th in the US for Metropolitan Statistical Areas

GDP
  - Total: $610.486 billion (2023)
- Time zone: UTC−5 (EST)
  - Summer (DST): UTC−4 (EDT)
- Area codes: 617, 781, 857, 339, 978, 508, 351, 774, 603, 401

Greater Boston is the metropolitan region of New England encompassing the municipality of Boston, the capital of the U.S. state of Massachusetts and the most populous city in New England, and its surrounding areas, home to 4,941,632. The most stringent definition of the region, used by the Metropolitan Area Planning Council, consists of most of the eastern third of mainland Massachusetts, excluding the Merrimack Valley and most of Southeastern Massachusetts, though most definitions (including the U.S. Census definition) include much of these areas and portions of southern New Hampshire.

While the city of Boston covers 48.4 square miles (125 km^{2}) and has 675,647 residents as of the 2020 census, the urbanization has extended well into surrounding areas and the Combined Statistical Area (CSA in the rest of the document), which includes the Providence, Rhode Island, Manchester, New Hampshire, Cape Cod and Worcester areas, has a population of more than 8.4 million people, making it one of the most populous such regions in the U.S.

Some of Greater Boston's most well-known contributions involve the region's higher education and medical institutions. Greater Boston has been influential upon American history and industry. The region and the state of Massachusetts are global leaders in biotechnology, health care, engineering, higher education, finance, and maritime trade.

Greater Boston is ranked tenth in population among US metropolitan statistical areas, home to 4,941,632 people as of the 2020 United States census, and seventh among combined statistical areas, with a population of 8,493,824. The area has hosted many people and sites significant to American culture and history, particularly American literature, politics, and the American Revolution.

Plymouth was the site of the first colony in New England, founded in 1620 by the Pilgrims, passengers of the Mayflower. In 1692, the town of Salem and surrounding areas experienced one of America's most infamous cases of mass hysteria, the Salem witch trials. In the late 18th century, Boston became known as the "Cradle of Liberty" for the agitation there that led to the American Revolution.

The Greater Boston region has played a powerful scientific, commercial, and cultural role in the history of the United States. Before the American Civil War, the region was a center for the abolitionist, temperance, and transcendentalist movements. In 2004, Massachusetts became the first U.S. state to legally recognize same-sex marriage as a result of the decision of the Massachusetts Supreme Judicial Court in Boston. Many prominent American political dynasties have hailed from the Boston region, including the Adams and Kennedy families.

Harvard University in Cambridge is the oldest institution of higher learning in the United States, founded in 1636, with the largest financial endowment of any university, and whose Law School has spawned a contemporaneous majority of United States Supreme Court justices. Kendall Square in Cambridge has been called "the most innovative square mile on the planet", in reference to the high concentration of entrepreneurial start-ups and quality of innovation which have emerged in the vicinity of the square since 2010. Both Harvard University and the Massachusetts Institute of Technology, also in Cambridge, have been ranked among the most highly regarded academic institutions in the world.

== Geography ==
=== Boundary definitions ===
==== Metropolitan Area ====
The most restrictive definition of the Greater Boston area is the region administered by the Metropolitan Area Planning Council. The MAPC is a regional planning organization created by the Massachusetts legislature to oversee transportation infrastructure and economic development concerns in the Boston area. The MAPC includes 101 cities and towns that are grouped into eight subregions. These include most of the area within the region's outer circumferential highway, I-495. In 2013, the population of the MAPC district was 3.2 million, which was 48% of the total population of Massachusetts, in an area of 1,422 square miles (3,680 km^{2}), of which 39% is forested and an additional 11% is water, wetland, or other open space.

The cities and towns included in this definition are:

- Acton
- Arlington
- Ashland
- Bedford
- Bellingham
- Belmont
- Beverly
- Bolton
- Boston
- Boxborough
- Braintree
- Brookline
- Burlington
- Cambridge
- Canton
- Carlisle
- Chelsea
- Cohasset
- Concord
- Danvers
- Dedham
- Dover
- Duxbury
- Essex
- Everett
- Foxborough
- Framingham
- Franklin
- Gloucester
- Hamilton
- Hanover
- Hingham
- Holbrook
- Holliston
- Hopkinton
- Hudson
- Hull
- Ipswich
- Lexington
- Lincoln
- Littleton
- Lynn
- Lynnfield
- Malden
- Manchester-by-the-Sea
- Marblehead
- Marlborough
- Marshfield
- Maynard
- Medfield
- Medford
- Medway
- Melrose
- Middleton
- Milford
- Millis
- Milton
- Nahant
- Natick
- Needham
- Newton
- Norfolk
- North Reading
- Norwell
- Norwood
- Peabody
- Pembroke
- Quincy
- Randolph
- Reading
- Revere
- Rockland
- Rockport
- Salem
- Saugus
- Scituate
- Sharon
- Sherborn
- Somerville
- Southborough
- Stoneham
- Stoughton
- Stow
- Sudbury
- Swampscott
- Topsfield
- Wakefield
- Walpole
- Waltham
- Watertown
- Wayland
- Wellesley
- Wenham
- Weston
- Westwood
- Weymouth
- Wilmington
- Winchester
- Winthrop
- Woburn
- Wrentham

==== New England City and Town Area ====
Two definitions are used by the United States Census to define the Boston–Cambridge–Newton, MA–NH Metro Area or Boston–Cambridge–Newton, MA–NH Metropolitan NECTA, which is defined as a New England City and Town Area. The metro area definition is based on counties, while the NECTA definition is based on city and town boundaries. Counties included in the county-based definition include:

- Essex County, Massachusetts
- Middlesex County, Massachusetts
- Norfolk County, Massachusetts
- Plymouth County, Massachusetts
- Suffolk County, Massachusetts
- Rockingham County, New Hampshire
- Strafford County, New Hampshire

The NECTA definition includes all of the communities from the MAPC definition, as well as the Merrimack Valley communities, parts of southern New Hampshire (northward to Milford and Hampton, and the Taunton area.

Historical population
Census	Pop.	Note	%±
1850	650,357		—
1860	830,998		27.8%
1870	978,346		17.7%
1880	1,205,439		23.2%
1890	1,515,684		25.7%
1900	1,890,122		24.7%
1910	2,260,762		19.6%
1920	2,563,123		13.4%
1930	2,866,567		11.8%
1940	2,926,650		2.1%
1950	3,186,970		8.9%
1960	3,516,435		10.3%
1970	3,918,092		11.4%
1980	3,938,585		0.5%
1990	4,133,895		5.0%
2000	4,391,344		6.2%
2010	4,552,402		3.7%
2020	4,941,632		8.5%
2024 (est.)	5,025,517		1.7%
US Census

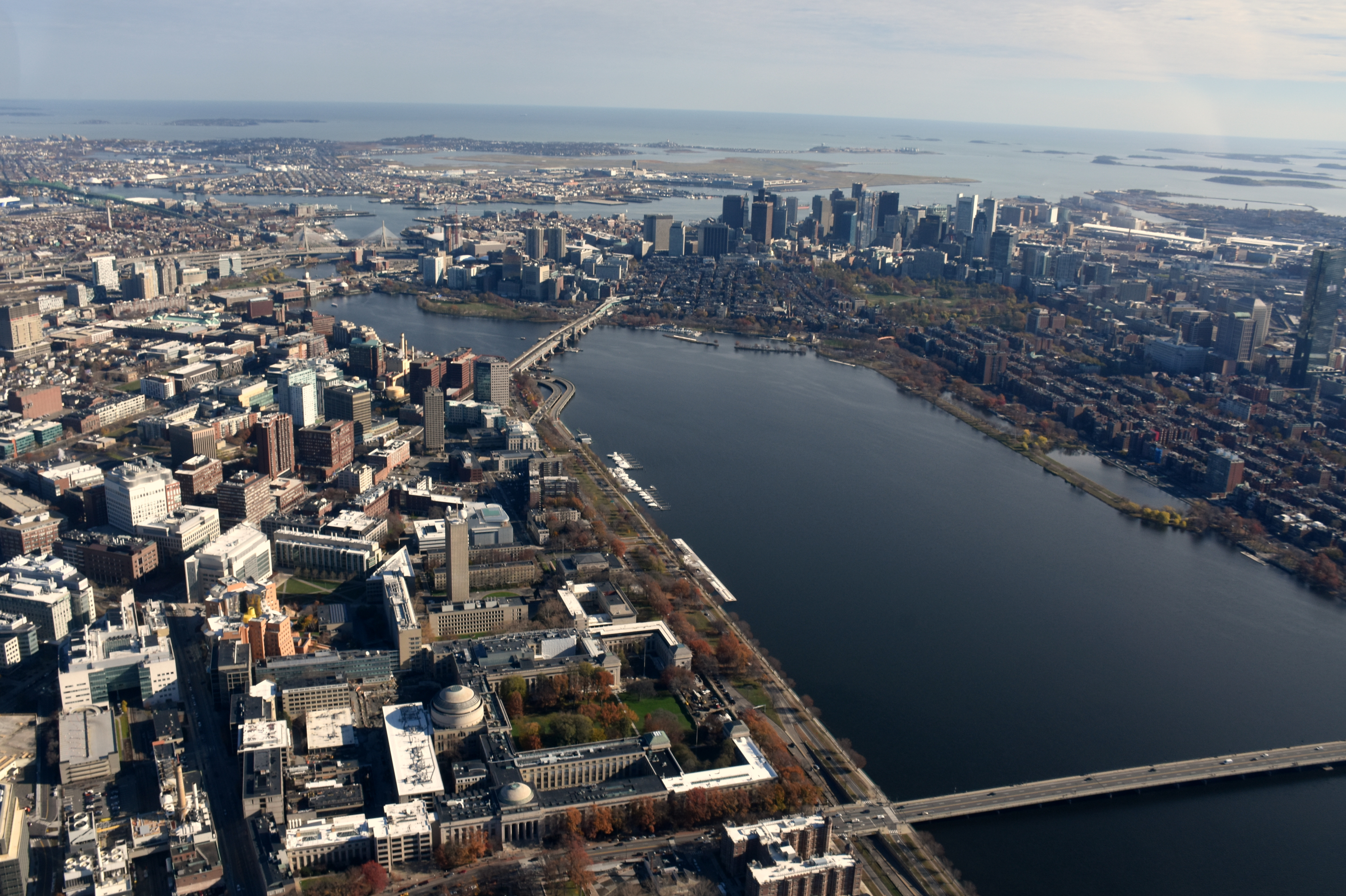
Cambridge and Boston with MIT and Kendall Square in the foreground and Boston's Financial District in the background

==== Combined Statistical Area ====
The widest definition of the metropolitan area based on commuting patterns, is defined by the U.S. Census as the Boston–Worcester–Providence combined statistical area. This area consists of the following counties in Massachusetts, Rhode Island, and New Hampshire:

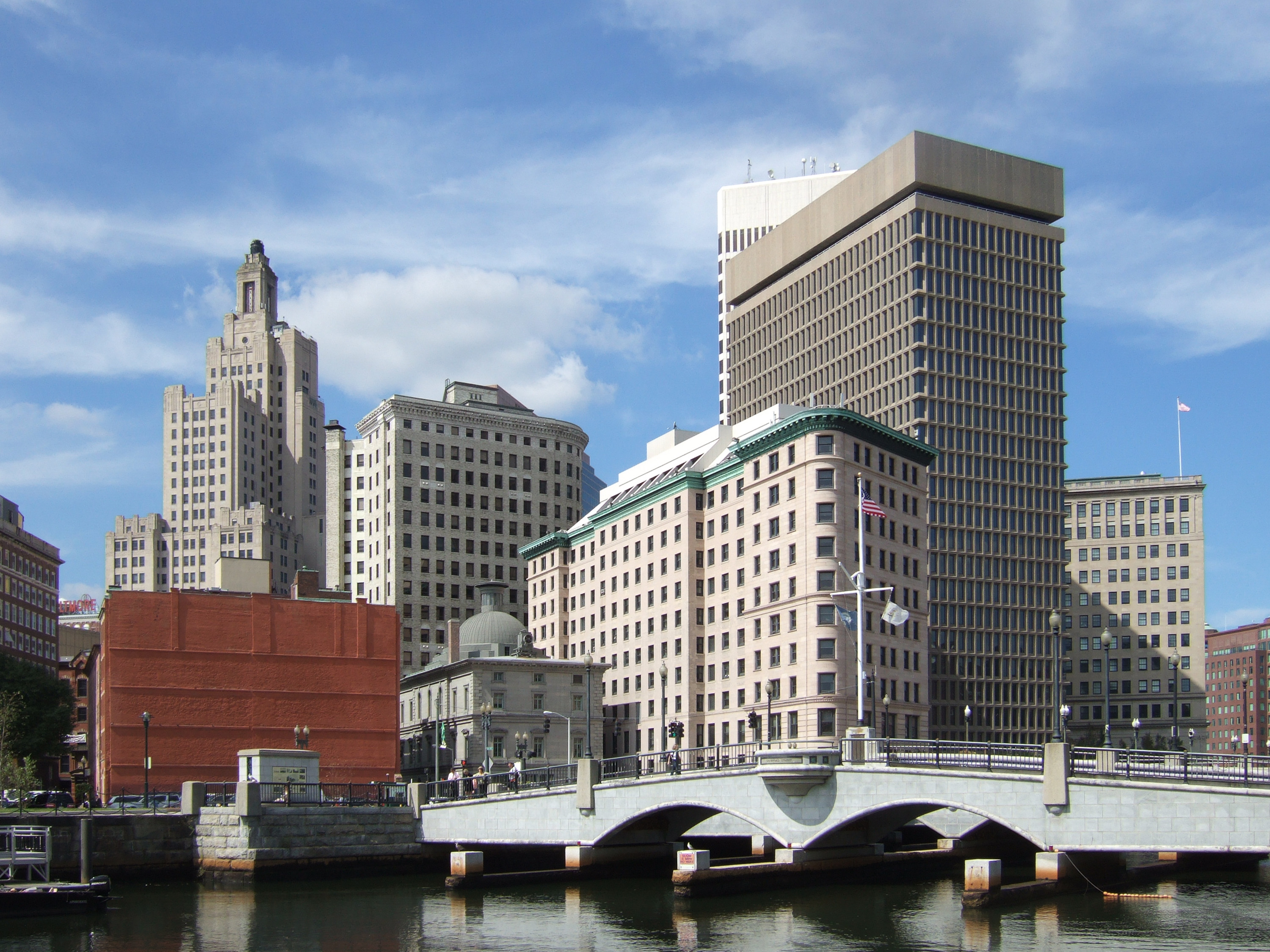
Downtown Providence, Rhode Island in 2008

- Massachusetts
  - Barnstable County, Massachusetts
  - Bristol County, Massachusetts
  - Essex County, Massachusetts
  - Middlesex County, Massachusetts
  - Norfolk County, Massachusetts
  - Plymouth County, Massachusetts
  - Suffolk County, Massachusetts
  - Worcester County, Massachusetts
- New Hampshire
  - Belknap County, New Hampshire
  - Hillsborough County, New Hampshire
  - Merrimack County, New Hampshire
  - Rockingham County, New Hampshire
  - Strafford County, New Hampshire
- Rhode Island
  - Bristol County, Rhode Island
  - Kent County, Rhode Island
  - Newport County, Rhode Island
  - Providence County, Rhode Island
  - Washington County, Rhode Island

The total population for the extended region was estimated at 7,493,824 at the 2020 census.

=== Subregions ===
- Massachusetts
  - Central Massachusetts
    - Montachusett-North County
    - South County
    - Blackstone River Valley
    - North Shore
    - Cape Ann
  - Merrimack Valley
  - MetroWest
  - Southeastern Massachusetts
    - Cape Cod
  - South Coast
  - South Shore
- New Hampshire
  - Lakes Region
  - Seacoast
- Rhode Island
  - Blackstone Valley
  - East Bay

=== Climate ===
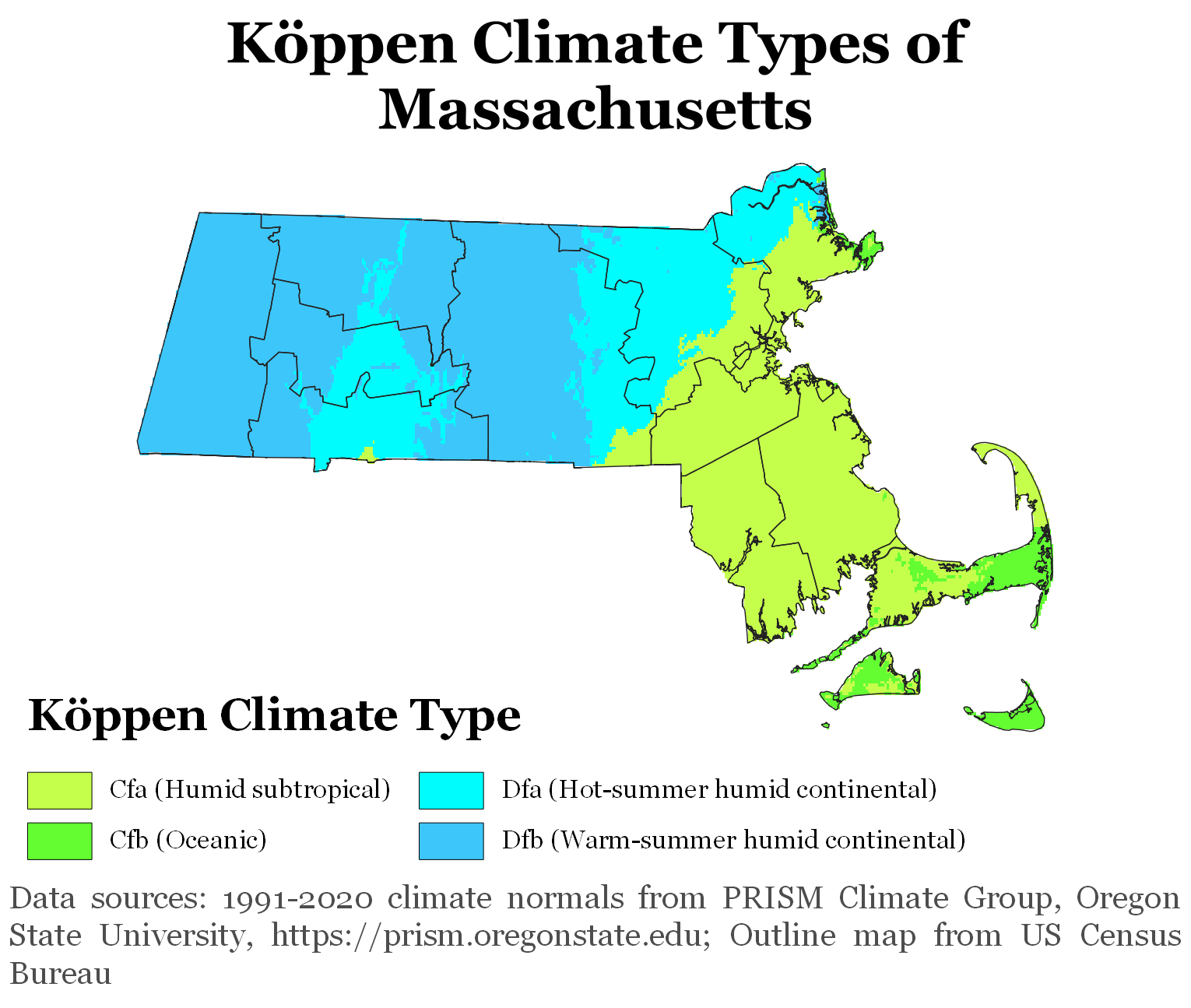
Most of Greater Boston have humid subtropical Cfa conditions, with humid continental Dfa and Dfb limited to the far northwest edges of the metropolitian region

Most of the Boston area has humid subtropical climates (Cfa under the Köppen climate classification system), with high humidity and precipitation year-round. The northwestern regions near New Hampshire and Worcester have humid continental Dfa and Dfb conditions due to January means being below −3 °C (27 °F) and July means below 22 °C (72 °F).

Climate data for Concord Municipal Airport, New Hampshire (1991−2020 normals, (Note: Mean monthly maxima and minima (i.e. the expected highest and lowest temperature readings at any point during the year or given month) calculated based on data at said location from 1991 to 2020.) extremes 1868–present) (Note: Official records for Concord were kept at downtown from September 1868 to April 1941 and at Concord Municipal Airport since May 1941; snow records date from December 1942. For more information, see ThreadEx)
Month	Jan	Feb	Mar	Apr	May	Jun	Jul	Aug	Sep	Oct	Nov	Dec	Year
Record high °F (°C)	72 (22)	74 (23)	89 (32)	95 (35)	98 (37)	101 (38)	102 (39)	101 (38)	98 (37)	92 (33)	80 (27)	73 (23)	102 (39)
Mean maximum °F (°C)	52.4 (11.3)	54.3 (12.4)	65.6 (18.7)	81.6 (27.6)	89.6 (32.0)	92.8 (33.8)	93.8 (34.3)	92.4 (33.6)	89.0 (31.7)	79.0 (26.1)	68.6 (20.3)	56.9 (13.8)	96.1 (35.6)
Mean daily maximum °F (°C)	31.6 (−0.2)	34.8 (1.6)	43.6 (6.4)	57.5 (14.2)	69.3 (20.7)	77.8 (25.4)	83.0 (28.3)	81.7 (27.6)	73.7 (23.2)	60.9 (16.1)	48.4 (9.1)	37.1 (2.8)	58.3 (14.6)
Daily mean °F (°C)	22.3 (−5.4)	24.7 (−4.1)	33.4 (0.8)	45.4 (7.4)	56.7 (13.7)	65.8 (18.8)	71.1 (21.7)	69.5 (20.8)	61.4 (16.3)	49.3 (9.6)	38.6 (3.7)	28.3 (−2.1)	47.2 (8.4)
Mean daily minimum °F (°C)	12.9 (−10.6)	14.7 (−9.6)	23.3 (−4.8)	33.3 (0.7)	44.1 (6.7)	53.7 (12.1)	59.2 (15.1)	57.2 (14.0)	49.0 (9.4)	37.8 (3.2)	28.7 (−1.8)	19.5 (−6.9)	36.1 (2.3)
Mean minimum °F (°C)	−9.2 (−22.9)	−7.2 (−21.8)	1.6 (−16.9)	19.2 (−7.1)	29.2 (−1.6)	39.0 (3.9)	47.1 (8.4)	44.1 (6.7)	32.1 (0.1)	22.1 (−5.5)	11.8 (−11.2)	−0.9 (−18.3)	−12.4 (−24.7)
Record low °F (°C)	−35 (−37)	−37 (−38)	−20 (−29)	4 (−16)	21 (−6)	26 (−3)	33 (1)	29 (−2)	20 (−7)	10 (−12)	−17 (−27)	−24 (−31)	−37 (−38)
Average precipitation inches (mm)	2.80 (71)	2.75 (70)	3.28 (83)	3.43 (87)	3.47 (88)	3.77 (96)	3.62 (92)	3.63 (92)	3.63 (92)	4.43 (113)	3.44 (87)	3.70 (94)	41.95 (1,066)
Average snowfall inches (cm)	17.1 (43)	16.9 (43)	13.6 (35)	2.5 (6.4)	0.0 (0.0)	0.0 (0.0)	0.0 (0.0)	0.0 (0.0)	0.0 (0.0)	0.8 (2.0)	2.5 (6.4)	14.3 (36)	67.7 (172)
Average extreme snow depth inches (cm)	11.9 (30)	15.3 (39)	13.9 (35)	4.0 (10)	0.0 (0.0)	0.0 (0.0)	0.0 (0.0)	0.0 (0.0)	0.0 (0.0)	0.6 (1.5)	2.0 (5.1)	9.1 (23)	19.8 (50)
Average precipitation days (≥ 0.01 in)	11.2	10.0	11.5	11.4	12.4	12.8	10.9	9.9	9.3	10.6	10.8	12.0	132.8
Average snowy days (≥ 0.1 in)	8.1	7.6	5.2	1.3	0.0	0.0	0.0	0.0	0.0	0.2	1.6	6.3	30.3
Average relative humidity (%)	67.9	66.0	64.8	62.0	65.0	70.9	71.8	74.5	76.3	72.8	73.3	72.3	69.8
Average dew point °F (°C)	10.2 (−12.1)	12.0 (−11.1)	20.8 (−6.2)	29.8 (−1.2)	42.1 (5.6)	53.8 (12.1)	58.8 (14.9)	57.9 (14.4)	50.5 (10.3)	38.3 (3.5)	28.8 (−1.8)	16.7 (−8.5)	35.0 (1.7)
Mean monthly sunshine hours	162.8	171.8	210.5	223.2	258.4	274.3	295.8	261.9	214.7	183.4	127.8	134.8	2,519.4
Percentage possible sunshine	56	58	57	56	57	60	64	61	57	54	44	48	56
Average ultraviolet index	1	2	4	5	7	8	8	7	6	3	2	1	5
Source 1: NOAA (relative humidity , dew points and sun 1961–1990)
Source 2: Weather Atlas (UV)

Climate data for Boston, Massachusetts (Logan Airport), 1991−2020 normals, (Note: Mean monthly maxima and minima (i.e. the expected highest and lowest temperature readings at any point during the year or given month) calculated based on data at said location from 1991 to 2020.) extremes 1872−present (Note: Official records for Boston were kept at downtown from January 1872 to December 1935, and at Logan Airport (KBOS) since January 1936.)
Month	Jan	Feb	Mar	Apr	May	Jun	Jul	Aug	Sep	Oct	Nov	Dec	Year
Record high °F (°C)	74 (23)	73 (23)	89 (32)	94 (34)	97 (36)	102 (39)	104 (40)	102 (39)	102 (39)	90 (32)	83 (28)	76 (24)	104 (40)
Mean maximum °F (°C)	58.3 (14.6)	57.9 (14.4)	67.0 (19.4)	79.9 (26.6)	88.1 (31.2)	92.2 (33.4)	95.0 (35.0)	93.7 (34.3)	88.9 (31.6)	79.6 (26.4)	70.2 (21.2)	61.2 (16.2)	96.4 (35.8)
Mean daily maximum °F (°C)	36.8 (2.7)	39.0 (3.9)	45.5 (7.5)	56.4 (13.6)	66.5 (19.2)	76.2 (24.6)	82.1 (27.8)	80.4 (26.9)	73.1 (22.8)	62.1 (16.7)	51.6 (10.9)	42.2 (5.7)	59.3 (15.2)
Daily mean °F (°C)	29.9 (−1.2)	31.8 (−0.1)	38.3 (3.5)	48.6 (9.2)	58.4 (14.7)	68.0 (20.0)	74.1 (23.4)	72.7 (22.6)	65.6 (18.7)	54.8 (12.7)	44.7 (7.1)	35.7 (2.1)	51.9 (11.1)
Mean daily minimum °F (°C)	23.1 (−4.9)	24.6 (−4.1)	31.1 (−0.5)	40.8 (4.9)	50.3 (10.2)	59.7 (15.4)	66.0 (18.9)	65.1 (18.4)	58.2 (14.6)	47.5 (8.6)	37.9 (3.3)	29.2 (−1.6)	44.5 (6.9)
Mean minimum °F (°C)	4.8 (−15.1)	8.3 (−13.2)	15.6 (−9.1)	31.0 (−0.6)	41.2 (5.1)	49.7 (9.8)	58.6 (14.8)	57.7 (14.3)	46.7 (8.2)	35.1 (1.7)	24.4 (−4.2)	13.1 (−10.5)	2.6 (−16.3)
Record low °F (°C)	−13 (−25)	−18 (−28)	−8 (−22)	11 (−12)	31 (−1)	41 (5)	50 (10)	46 (8)	34 (1)	25 (−4)	−2 (−19)	−17 (−27)	−18 (−28)
Average precipitation inches (mm)	3.39 (86)	3.21 (82)	4.17 (106)	3.63 (92)	3.25 (83)	3.89 (99)	3.27 (83)	3.23 (82)	3.56 (90)	4.03 (102)	3.66 (93)	4.30 (109)	43.59 (1,107)
Average snowfall inches (cm)	14.3 (36)	14.4 (37)	9.0 (23)	1.6 (4.1)	0.0 (0.0)	0.0 (0.0)	0.0 (0.0)	0.0 (0.0)	0.0 (0.0)	0.2 (0.51)	0.7 (1.8)	9.0 (23)	49.2 (125)
Average precipitation days (≥ 0.01 in)	11.8	10.6	11.6	11.6	11.8	10.9	9.4	9.0	9.0	10.5	10.3	11.9	128.4
Average snowy days (≥ 0.1 in)	6.6	6.2	4.4	0.8	0.0	0.0	0.0	0.0	0.0	0.2	0.6	4.2	23.0
Average relative humidity (%)	62.3	62.0	63.1	63.0	66.7	68.5	68.4	70.8	71.8	68.5	67.5	65.4	66.5
Average dew point °F (°C)	19.8 (−6.8)	20.3 (−6.5)	26.2 (−3.2)	35.1 (1.7)	46.2 (7.9)	56.3 (13.5)	62.1 (16.7)	61.7 (16.5)	55.9 (13.3)	45.0 (7.2)	34.5 (1.4)	25.9 (−3.4)	40.8 (4.9)
Mean monthly sunshine hours	163.4	168.4	213.7	227.2	267.3	286.5	300.9	277.3	237.1	206.3	143.2	142.3	2,633.6
Percentage possible sunshine	56	57	58	57	59	63	65	64	63	60	49	50	59
Average ultraviolet index	1	2	4	5	7	8	8	8	6	4	2	1	5
Source 1: NOAA (relative humidity, and sun 1961−1990)
Source 2: Weather Atlas (UV)

Climate data for Boston, Massachusetts
Month	Jan	Feb	Mar	Apr	May	Jun	Jul	Aug	Sep	Oct	Nov	Dec	Year
Average sea temperature °F (°C)	41.3 (5.2)	38.1 (3.4)	38.4 (3.5)	43.1 (6.2)	49.2 (9.5)	58.4 (14.7)	65.7 (18.7)	67.9 (20.0)	64.8 (18.2)	59.4 (15.3)	52.3 (11.3)	46.6 (8.2)	52.1 (11.2)
Source: Weather Atlas

Climate data for Providence, Rhode Island (T. F. Green Airport), 1991–2020 normals, (Note: Mean monthly maxima and minima (i.e. the expected highest and lowest temperature readings at any point during the year or given month) calculated based on data at said location from 1991 to 2020.) extremes 1904–present (Note: Official records for Providence kept at downtown from November 1904 to May 1932 and at T. F. Green Airport since June 1932.)
Month	Jan	Feb	Mar	Apr	May	Jun	Jul	Aug	Sep	Oct	Nov	Dec	Year
Record high °F (°C)	70 (21)	72 (22)	90 (32)	98 (37)	96 (36)	100 (38)	102 (39)	104 (40)	100 (38)	88 (31)	81 (27)	77 (25)	104 (40)
Mean maximum °F (°C)	58.7 (14.8)	57.9 (14.4)	67.1 (19.5)	79.3 (26.3)	87.2 (30.7)	91.5 (33.1)	94.8 (34.9)	92.7 (33.7)	87.6 (30.9)	78.9 (26.1)	70.1 (21.2)	61.5 (16.4)	96.6 (35.9)
Mean daily maximum °F (°C)	38.3 (3.5)	40.5 (4.7)	47.7 (8.7)	58.9 (14.9)	68.9 (20.5)	77.7 (25.4)	83.6 (28.7)	82.2 (27.9)	74.8 (23.8)	63.8 (17.7)	53.2 (11.8)	43.4 (6.3)	61.1 (16.2)
Daily mean °F (°C)	30.2 (−1.0)	32.0 (0.0)	38.9 (3.8)	49.3 (9.6)	59.1 (15.1)	68.2 (20.1)	74.4 (23.6)	73.0 (22.8)	65.6 (18.7)	54.4 (12.4)	44.5 (6.9)	35.5 (1.9)	52.1 (11.2)
Mean daily minimum °F (°C)	22.1 (−5.5)	23.5 (−4.7)	30.2 (−1.0)	39.6 (4.2)	49.2 (9.6)	58.8 (14.9)	65.2 (18.4)	63.9 (17.7)	56.5 (13.6)	45.1 (7.3)	35.8 (2.1)	27.6 (−2.4)	43.1 (6.2)
Mean minimum °F (°C)	4.1 (−15.5)	7.4 (−13.7)	15.1 (−9.4)	28.5 (−1.9)	38.1 (3.4)	47.2 (8.4)	56.2 (13.4)	54.3 (12.4)	43.1 (6.2)	31.7 (−0.2)	21.8 (−5.7)	12.3 (−10.9)	2.0 (−16.7)
Record low °F (°C)	−13 (−25)	−17 (−27)	1 (−17)	11 (−12)	29 (−2)	39 (4)	48 (9)	40 (4)	32 (0)	20 (−7)	6 (−14)	−12 (−24)	−17 (−27)
Average precipitation inches (mm)	3.96 (101)	3.44 (87)	4.90 (124)	4.29 (109)	3.37 (86)	3.81 (97)	2.91 (74)	3.59 (91)	4.17 (106)	4.18 (106)	4.27 (108)	4.65 (118)	47.54 (1,208)
Average snowfall inches (cm)	10.3 (26)	10.5 (27)	6.4 (16)	0.6 (1.5)	0.0 (0.0)	0.0 (0.0)	0.0 (0.0)	0.0 (0.0)	0.0 (0.0)	0.2 (0.51)	1.0 (2.5)	7.6 (19)	36.6 (93)
Average precipitation days (≥ 0.01 in)	11.2	10.3	11.6	11.7	12.2	10.8	9.3	9.1	9.1	10.2	9.6	11.9	127.0
Average snowy days (≥ 0.1 in)	5.7	5.4	3.7	0.4	0.0	0.0	0.0	0.0	0.0	0.1	0.6	3.4	19.3
Average relative humidity (%)	63.9	63.0	62.9	61.4	66.6	70.1	71.0	72.5	73.0	70.2	68.9	67.0	67.5
Average dew point °F (°C)	16.3 (−8.7)	17.4 (−8.1)	25.0 (−3.9)	33.1 (0.6)	45.0 (7.2)	55.6 (13.1)	61.5 (16.4)	61.0 (16.1)	53.8 (12.1)	42.6 (5.9)	33.3 (0.7)	22.1 (−5.5)	38.9 (3.8)
Mean monthly sunshine hours	171.7	172.6	215.6	225.1	254.9	274.1	290.6	262.8	233.0	208.7	148.0	148.6	2,605.7
Percentage possible sunshine	58	58	58	56	57	60	63	61	62	61	50	52	58
Average ultraviolet index	1	2	4	6	7	8	8	8	6	4	2	1	5
Source 1: NOAA (relative humidity, dew point, and sun 1961–1990)
Source 2: Weather Atlas

Climate data for Providence
Month	Jan	Feb	Mar	Apr	May	Jun	Jul	Aug	Sep	Oct	Nov	Dec	Year
Average sea temperature °F (°C)	41.4 (5.2)	38.1 (3.4)	38.7 (3.8)	44.1 (6.7)	50.9 (10.5)	59.6 (15.3)	67.0 (19.4)	69.3 (20.7)	66.7 (19.3)	61.6 (16.4)	54.2 (12.3)	47.7 (8.8)	53.3 (11.8)
Source: Weather Atlas

== Demographics ==
Population density in the Boston urban area

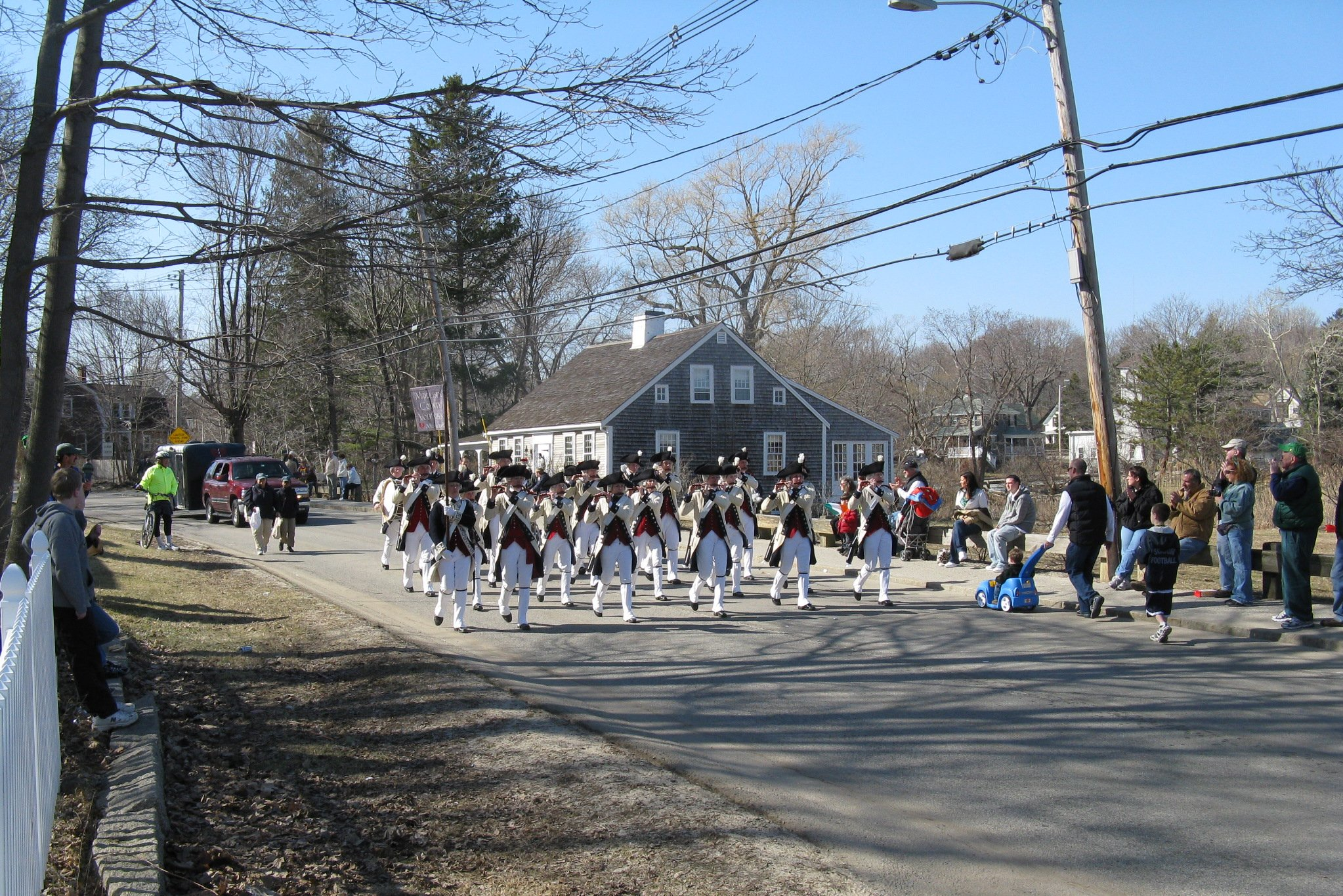
St. Patrick's Day Parade in Scituate, Massachusetts, in Plymouth County, the municipality with the highest percentage identifying Irish ancestry in the United States, at 47.5% in 2010. Irish Americans constitute the largest ethnicity in Greater Boston.

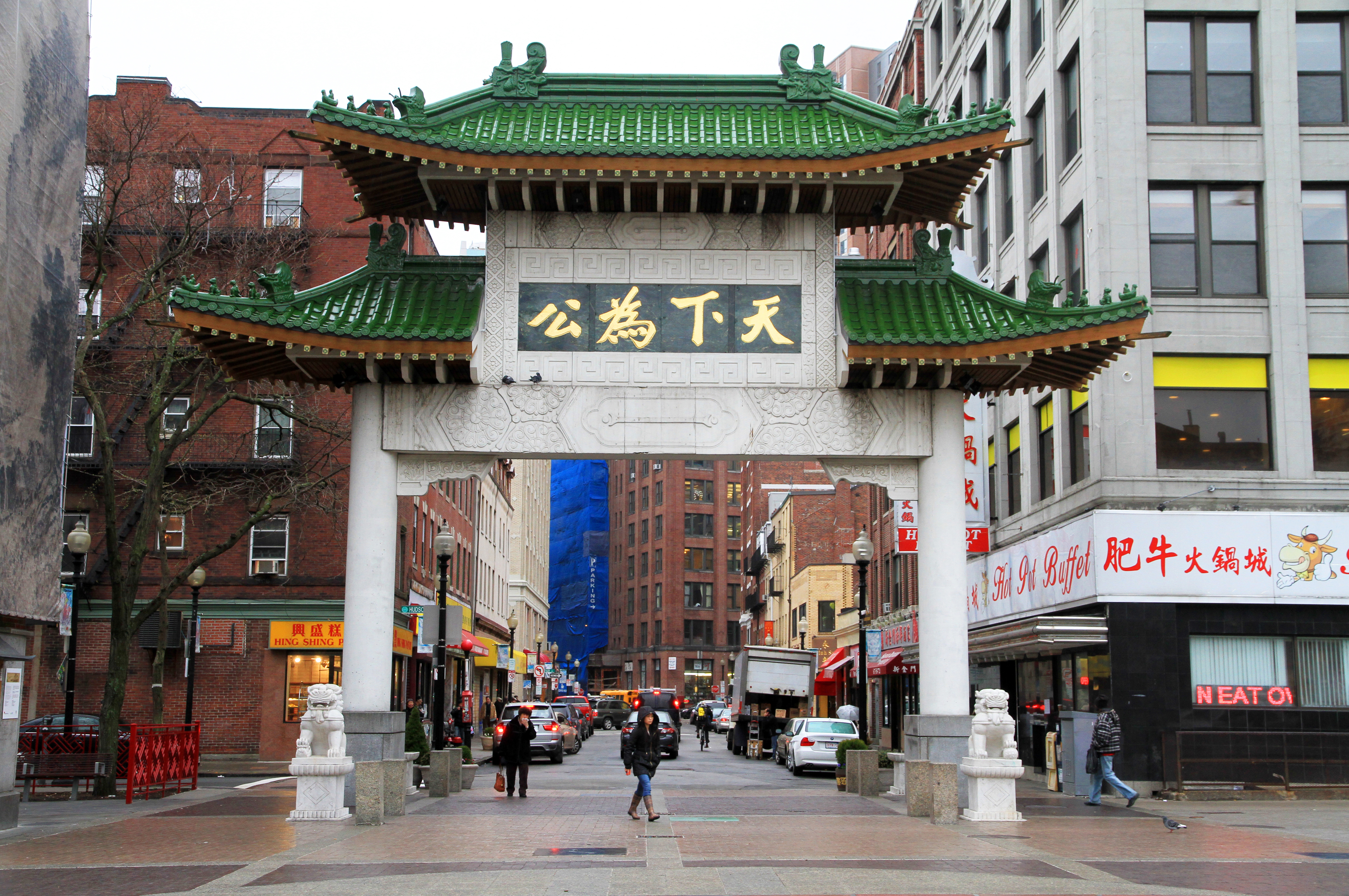
Boston's Chinatown, with its paifang gate, is home to many Chinese and also Vietnamese restaurants.

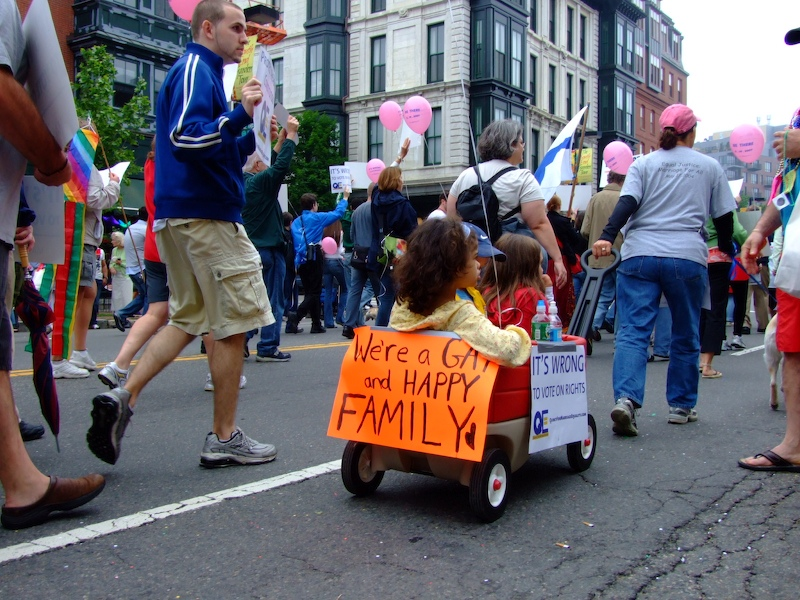
Boston gay pride march, held annually in June

Greater Boston has a sizable Jewish community, estimated at between 210,000 people, and 261,000 or 5–6% of the Greater Boston metro population, compared with about 2% for the nation as a whole. Contrary to national trends, the number of Jews in Greater Boston has been growing, fueled by the fact that 60% of children in Jewish mixed-faith families are raised Jewish, compared with roughly one in three nationally. The 2020 PRRI Atlas found that 35% of the Boston metro area identified as Protestant while 26% identified as Catholic.

The City of Boston also has one of the largest LGBT populations per capita. As of 2006, it ranks fifth of all major cities in the country (behind San Francisco, and slightly behind Seattle, Atlanta, and Minneapolis), with 12.3% of the city identifying as gay, lesbian, or bisexual.

County	2025 Estimate	2020 Census	Change	Area	Density
Middlesex County, Massachusetts	1,669,979	1,632,002	+2.33%	817.82 sq mi (2,118.1 km^{2})	2,042/sq mi (788/km^{2})
Essex County, Massachusetts	826,653	809,829	+2.08%	492.56 sq mi (1,275.7 km^{2})	1,678/sq mi (648/km^{2})
Suffolk County, Massachusetts	791,891	797,936	−0.76%	58.15 sq mi (150.6 km^{2})	13,618/sq mi (5,258/km^{2})
Norfolk County, Massachusetts	739,749	725,981	+1.90%	396.11 sq mi (1,025.9 km^{2})	1,868/sq mi (721/km^{2})
Plymouth County, Massachusetts	546,829	530,819	+3.02%	659.07 sq mi (1,707.0 km^{2})	830/sq mi (320/km^{2})
Rockingham County, New Hampshire	324,077	314,176	+3.15%	694.72 sq mi (1,799.3 km^{2})	466/sq mi (180/km^{2})
Strafford County, New Hampshire	135,043	130,889	+3.17%	368.97 sq mi (955.6 km^{2})	366/sq mi (141/km^{2})
Total	5,034,221	4,941,642	+1.87%	3,487.40 sq mi (9,032.3 km^{2})	1,444/sq mi (557/km^{2})

The 40 most diverse Census tracts in the Boston CSA:

Rank	City or neighborhood	Census tract	Population	% White	% Black	% Hispanic	% Asian	% multiracial or other
1	Dorchester	916	3,138	12	32	15	26	14
2	Pawtucket	161	4,607	28	24	28	1	18
3	Pawtucket	151	4,472	24	24	29	1	23
4	Pawtucket	164	4,938	29	26	21	2	20
5	Dorchester	912	3,234	30	24	22	6	18
6	Dorchester	92101	6,451	30	22	11	31	6
7	Brockton	5115	4,308	21	32	13	2	32
8	Brockton	511	3,040	28	33	15	1	24
9	New Bedford	6519	1,942	26	11	33	1	29
10	Mission Hill	80801	3,885	32	20	35	10	2
11	Pawtucket	154	2,258	35	20	35	0	11
12	Brockton	5114	3,716	24	36	14	2	23
13	Brockton	5109	2,531	24	36	16	1	24
14	Brockton	5103	3,798	23	38	15	2	24
15	Brockton	5104	3,706	19	38	15	2	25
16	Dorchester	90901	3,730	38	18	21	20	4
17	Worcester	733	3,762	38	10	37	12	4
18	Providence	26	3,098	23	22	39	10	6
19	Malden	3415	4,780	39	23	14	19	5
20	Cambridge	3524	2,126	27	39	16	12	5
21	South End	71202	3,131	39	19	24	15	3
22	Brockton	511301	5,334	39	31	11	2	17
23	Providence	15	2,994	28	13	41	14	4
24	South Boston	61	3,098	41	15	29	11	4
25	Lynn	2072	2,939	30	12	42	13	2
26	Cambridge	3549	6,058	35	30	9	20	5
27	South Boston	61101	2,232	20	21	42	14	2
28	Brockton	5116	7,211	42	29	10	2	16
29	Roxbury	801	3,350	15	43	28	1	11
30	Lowell	3114	5,986	44	11	14	26	5
31	Brockton	5108	6,339	18	44	12	2	22
32	Mission Hill	81001	4,890	45	14	19	19	2
33	Malden	3418	6,554	46	20	13	16	5
34	South Boston	607	1,893	19	20	46	10	5
35	Brockton	5107	5,656	46	31	8	4	11
36	Brockton	5112	4,849	47	26	11	1	13
37	Somerville	351404	4,289	47	7	22	13	11
38	Lynn	2071	3,513	18	11	48	19	3
39	Framingham	383101	4,923	23	10	48	1	18
40	Mission Hill	811	4,091	48	21	15	13	2

The 40 census tracts in the Boston CSA with the highest percentage of residents who identify as Hispanic or Latino:

Rank	City or Neighborhood	Census Tract	Population	% Hispanic or Latino
1	Lawrence	2525	3,810	94
2	Lawrence	2509	2,193	93
3	Lawrence	2504	3,858	90
4	Lawrence	2503	2,101	89
5	Lawrence	2513	3,721	89
6	Lawrence	2512	1,356	86
7	Lawrence	2507	4,756	86
8	Lawrence	251	1,782	85
9	Chelsea	1602	4,043	83
10	Lawrence	2506	5,599	83
11	Lawrence	2514	5,053	77
12	Chelsea	160101	7,551	76
13	Lawrence	2501	2,329	75
14	Lawrence	2516	5,977	74
15	Lawrence	2511	2,937	73
16	Lawrence	2502	5,524	72
17	Chelsea	1604	2,716	71
18	Chelsea	160501	5,604	71
19	Providence	16	8,540	70
20	Lawrence	2515	6,149	70
21	Worcester	732001	3,327	67
22	East Boston	506	2,063	67
23	East Boston	502	5,231	66
24	East Boston	507	4,504	65
25	East Boston	50901	4,165	65
26	Providence	2	6,452	64
27	Providence	4	3,761	64
28	Providence	14	6,693	63
29	Providence	5	3,040	63
30	Central Falls	11	5,534	63
31	Lawrence	2508	6,932	63
32	Chelsea	160502	4,460	62
33	Methuen	2524	4,175	62
34	Providence	17	3,744	62
35	Providence	18	7,114	61
36	Central Falls	111	4,176	61
37	East Boston	50101	5,115	61
38	Lawrence	2517	5,145	61
39	Providence	3	7,714	60
40	Central Falls	108	4,763	59

Census tracts in the Boston CSA with the highest percentage of residents who identify as Black American:

Rank	City or Neighborhood	Census Tract	Population	% Black
1	Mattapan	101101	3,115	84
2	Mattapan	101102	4,396	84
3	Mattapan	101001	5,480	83
4	Mattapan	1003	3,303	80
5	Mattapan	1002	2,787	78
6	Mattapan	101002	4,979	77
7	Dorchester	923	2,893	77
8	Roxbury	82	2,815	74
9	Roxbury	817	3,820	71
10	Hyde Park	1404	7,650	71
11	Roxbury	901	4,571	71
12	Dorchester	919	3,860	70
13	Dorchester	1004	4,865	68
14	Roxbury	819	3,115	66
15	Roxbury	924	5,277	66
16	Roxbury	818	2,898	65
17	Mattapan	1001	5,510	64
18	Roxbury	815	2,134	62
19	Roxbury	821	5,025	62
20	Roxbury	803	1,769	60
21	Roxbury	903	3,179	58
22	Dorchester	1009	4,072	58
23	Dorchester	1005	5,909	55
24	Hyde Park	1403	6,382	54
25	Dorchester	92	4,945	54
26	Roxbury	902	2,233	53
27	Dorchester	918	3,452	52
28	Roxbury	904	3,659	52
29	Roxbury	814	3,003	50
30	Roxbury	80401	2,710	50
31	Roslindale	140106	1,901	49
32	Dorchester	917	3,069	47
33	Dorchester	914	2,741	46
34	Brockton	5108	6,339	44
35	Roxbury	805	3,096	44
36	Roxbury	801	3,350	43
37	Randolph	420302	7,703	42
38	Roxbury	813	4,760	42
39	Dorchester	922	3,349	42
40	Randolph	420202	6,303	40

Census tracts in the Boston CSA with the highest percentage of residents who identify as Asian American:

Rank	City or Neighborhood	Census Tract	Population	% Asian
1	South End	70402	1,723	70
2	Chinatown	702	5,218	58
3	Lowell	3112	3,267	55
4	Lowell	3118	3,513	54
5	Lowell	3117	5,098	47
6	Quincy	417502	4,639	45
7	Quincy	4172	8,182	44
8	Malden	3413	5,439	39
9	Lowell	3113	4,057	38
10	Westborough	742402	3,026	38
11	Quincy	417501	5,004	37
12	Cambridge	353102	5,040	36
13	Quincy	417802	3,150	35
14	Lowell	3111	2,410	34
15	Lowell	3115	2,974	33
16	Dorchester	92101	6,451	31
17	Quincy	417601	5,196	30
18	Fenway–Kenmore	10103	4,569	29
19	Quincy	4180002	7,020	28
20	Quincy	417602	5,155	28
21	Chinatown/Leather District/Downtown	70101	5,902	27
22	Cambridge	3539	7,090	27
23	Lowell	3114	5,986	26
24	Lowell	3116	5,295	26
25	Lowell	3107	4,441	26
26	Quincy	4171	4,264	26
27	Dorchester	916	3,138	26
28	Malden	3412	6,857	25
29	Malden	341102	4,564	25
30	Malden	341101	3,675	25
31	Acton	363102	5,909	25
32	Dorchester	911	4,861	25
33	Allston-Brighton	703	2,791	24
34	Lexington	3583	5,526	24
35	Quincy	418004	4,280	23
36	Brookline	4009	3,865	22
37	Cambridge	3532	4,897	22
38	Cambridge	352101	1,654	22
39	Shrewsbury	7391	9,557	22
40	Westborough	7612	5,780	22

Census tracts in the Boston CSA with the highest percentage of residents who identify as Irish American:

City or Neighborhood	Census Tract	Population	% Irish
South Boston	60101	3,106	68
Milton	416400	6,069	63
Charlestown	040401	2,439	63
Dorchester	1007	4,322	63
South Boston	608	3,964	62
South Boston	604	4,904	61
Milton	416101	5,724	58
Marshfield	506204	4,886	57
Weymouth	422100	5,293	57
Quincy	417801	5,443	55
Hull	500101	3,702	55
Scituate	505101	3,860	55
West Roxbury	130402	4,637	54
Quincy	417400	2,566	53
South Boston	60301	3,076	52
Abington	520100	6,458	52
Braintree	419200	5,002	52
Braintree	419600	6,766	52
Abington	520201	3,952	52
Pembroke	508200	6,031	52

Census tracts in the Boston CSA with the highest percentage of residents who identify as Italian American:

City or Neighborhood	Census Tract	Population	% Italian
Johnston	012402	2,486	63
Cranston	014501	5,179	58
Johnston	012500	5,490	57
Johnston	012200	7,187	57
Providence	011902	4,780	55
Cranston	014800	5,591	55
Saugus	208102	3,343	51
Cranston	014300	4,716	49
Cranston	014600	6,991	49
Cranston	014502	4,096	48
Johnston	012300	6,656	48
Johnston	012401	6,950	48
Stoneham	337102	5,042	45
Stoneham	337202	4,849	45
Revere	170200	4,564	45
Revere	170502	2,818	43
Cranston	013900	2,992	43
Revere	170300	9,040	43
North Providence	012103	2,965	43

Census tracts in the Boston CSA with the highest percentage of residents who identify as Portuguese American:

City or Neighborhood	Census Tract	Population	% Portuguese
New Bedford	652800	3,277	72
Fall River	640600	4,450	69
Dartmouth	653203	5,005	65
New Bedford	652400	2,664	64
New Bedford	652000	2,676	62
Fall River	640500	5,165	60
Fall River	641200	2,803	59
New Bedford	650500	3,141	58
Fall River	640901	5,071	58
New Bedford	650400	3,773	57
New Bedford	652500	2,589	56
East Providence	010400	6,661	55
New Bedford	652300	2,870	54
Fall River	641000	2,419	54
Fall River	640300	3,693	53
Westport	646101	7,356	53
Fall River	640700	2,900	53
Fall River	640400	2,682	53
New Bedford	650101	5,753	53
Fall River	640100	5,358	52

Census tracts in the Boston CSA with French or French Canadian listed as first ancestry:

City or Neighborhood	Census Tract	Population	% French
Woonsocket	018500	2,831	66
Woonsocket	017700	3,518	61
Woonsocket	017500	3,128	59
Woonsocket	017800	2,514	58
Burrillville	013001	3,479	56
North Smithfield	012802	2,391	54
North Smithfield	012803	4,776	53
Burrillville	013002	7,539	53
North Smithfield	012801	4,800	52
Manchester	002300	3,758	52
Woonsocket	017900	3,049	51
Burrillville	012900	4,937	50
Manchester	000202	2,297	49
Manchester	002100	4,782	49
Woonsocket	017600	2,560	49
Manchester	002600	5,746	48
Manchester	002200	3,232	47
Woonsocket	018400	6,527	47
Blackstone	747101	5,110	47
Woonsocket	018000	2,680	46

=== Largest cities and towns ===
Cities and towns with a population over 50,000 as of the 2020 census include:

State capital
State largest city

Rank	Name	State	Population (2020)	Population (2010)	Change
1.	Boston	Massachusetts	675,647	617,594	+9.40%
2.	Worcester	Massachusetts	206,518	181,045	+14.07%
3.	Providence	Rhode Island	190,934	178,042	+7.24%
4.	Cambridge	Massachusetts	118,403	105,162	+12.59%
5.	Manchester	New Hampshire	115,644	109,565	+5.55%
6.	Lowell	Massachusetts	115,554	106,519	+8.48%
7.	Brockton	Massachusetts	105,643	93,810	+12.61%
8.	Quincy	Massachusetts	101,636	92,271	+10.15%
9.	Lynn	Massachusetts	101,253	90,329	+12.09%
10.	New Bedford	Massachusetts	101,079	95,072	+6.32%
11.	Fall River	Massachusetts	94,000	88,857	+5.79%
12.	Nashua	New Hampshire	91,322	86,494	+5.58%
13.	Lawrence	Massachusetts	89,143	76,377	+16.71%
14.	Newton	Massachusetts	88,923	85,146	+4.44%
15.	Cranston	Rhode Island	82,934	80,387	+3.17%
16.	Warwick	Rhode Island	82,823	82,672	+0.18%
17.	Somerville	Massachusetts	81,045	75,754	+6.98%
18.	Pawtucket	Rhode Island	75,604	71,148	+6.26%
19.	Framingham	Massachusetts	72,362	68,318	+5.92%
20.	Haverhill	Massachusetts	67,787	60,879	+11.35%
21.	Malden	Massachusetts	66,263	59,450	+11.46%
22.	Waltham	Massachusetts	65,218	60,632	+7.56%
23.	Brookline	Massachusetts	63,191	58,732	+7.59%
24.	Revere	Massachusetts	62,186	51,755	+20.15%
25.	Plymouth	Massachusetts	61,217	56,468	+8.41%
26.	Medford	Massachusetts	59,659	56,173	+6.21%
27.	Taunton	Massachusetts	59,408	55,874	+6.32%
28.	Weymouth	Massachusetts	57,437	53,743	+6.87%
29.	Peabody	Massachusetts	54,481	51,251	+6.30%
30.	Methuen	Massachusetts	53,059	47,255	+12.28%

== Education ==
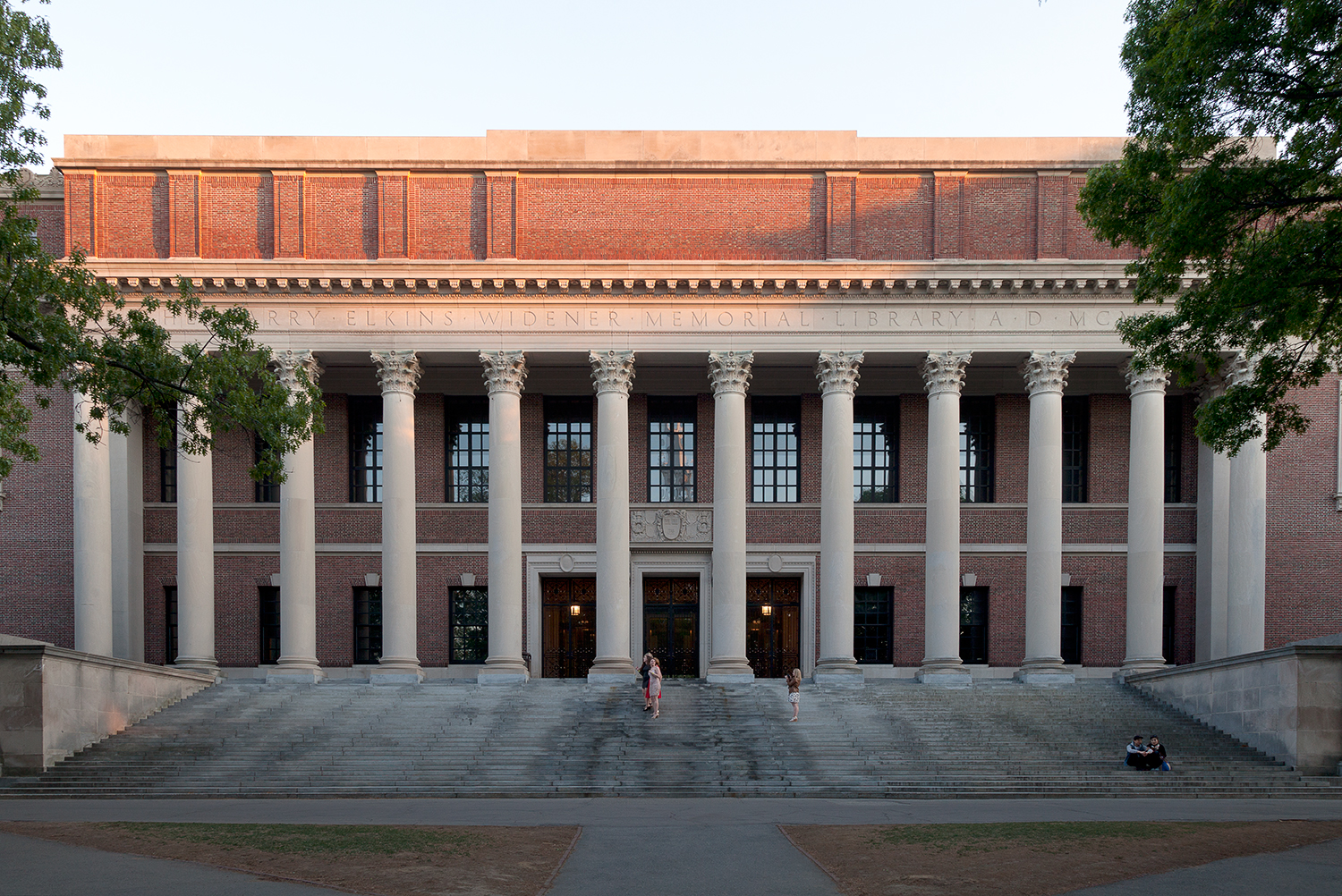
Harvard University, a leading global university, is located in Cambridge, MA in Greater Boston

The area includes many community colleges, two-year schools, and internationally prominent undergraduate and graduate institutions. The graduate schools include schools of law, medicine, business, technology, international relations, public health, education, and religion. Greater Boston contains seven R1 Research Institutions as per the Carnegie Classification of Institutions of Higher Education. This is, by far, the highest number of such institutions in a single Metropolitan Statistical Area in the United States.

== Economy ==
=== Major companies ===
References:

- Abbott Laboratories, in Worcester (pharmaceutical laboratory)
- Advanced Cell Technology, in Worcester (research laboratory)
- Akamai Technologies, in Cambridge (headquarters)
- AMD, in Boxborough
- American Tower (headquarters)
- Analog Devices, in Norwood
- AstraZeneca, in Waltham (R&D)
- Athenahealth, in Watertown, Massachusetts (headquarters)
- Atlantic Broadband, in Quincy
- Atlantic Tele-Network, in Beverly
- Au Bon Pain (headquarters)
- Avid Technology, Inc, in Burlington (headquarters)
- Azimuth Systems, in Acton
- Bain & Company, in Boston (headquarters)
- Bain Capital, in Boston (headquarters)
- BBN Technologies, in Cambridge (headquarters)
- Bertucci's Corporation, in Northborough (headquarters)
- Biocell Center, in Medford (North American headquarters)
- Biogen Idec, in Weston (North American headquarters)
- BJ's Wholesale Club, Inc., in Westborough (headquarters)
- Blue Cross Blue Shield of Massachusetts (headquarters)
- Bose Corporation, in Framingham (headquarters)
- Boston Consulting Group (headquarters)
- Boston Properties, Inc., in Boston (headquarters)
- Boston Scientific Corporation, in Marlborough (headquarters)
- Carl Zeiss SMT, in Peabody (North American headquarters)
- Charles River Laboratories, in Wilmington (headquarters)
- Cisco Systems, in Boxborough
- Constant Contact, in Waltham
- Converse (headquarters)
- David Clark Company, in Worcester (manufacturer of space suits)
- Dell Technologies, in Hopkinton (headquarters)
- Diebold, in Marlborough (regional headquarters)
- Dunkin' Brands, in Canton (headquarters)
- Evergreen Solar, in Marlborough (headquarters)
- Facebook, in Cambridge
- Fidelity Investments (headquarters)
- General Electric Aviation, in Lynn
- General Electric (headquarters)
- The Gillette Company, now owned by Procter & Gamble (headquarters)
- Global Partners, in Waltham (headquarters)
- Google Inc., in Cambridge
- Haemonetics, in Braintree
- Hewlett-Packard, in Marlborough (regional headquarters)
- Houghton Mifflin Harcourt (headquarters)
- HourlyNerd, in Boston
- IBM, in Waltham, Cambridge and Littleton
- Innerscope Research, in Boston (headquarters)
- Intel Corporation, in Hudson
- InterSystems Corporation, in Cambridge (headquarters)
- iRobot Corporation, in Burlington (headquarters)
- John Hancock Financial Services, Inc, now the United States division of Canada's Manulife Financial
- Keurig, in Burlington (headquarters)
- Kronos Incorporated, in Chelmsford, Massachusetts (headquarters)
- Liberty Mutual (headquarters)
- Lionbridge, in Waltham (US headquarters)
- LogMeIn (headquarters)
- LPL Financial (headquarters)
- The MathWorks, in Natick
- Marshalls, Inc, in Framingham (headquarters)
- Meditech, in Westwood (headquarters)
- Microsoft Corporation, in Cambridge
- Millennium Pharmaceuticals, in Cambridge
- MITRE Corporation, in Bedford (headquarters)
- Moderna, in Cambridge (headquarters)
- Motorola Solutions, Inc., in Somerville
- National Amusements, in Norwood (headquarters)
- National Grid, in Waltham (US headquarters)
- NetApp Inc, in Waltham
- New Balance Athletic Shoe, Inc. (headquarters)
- Nokia, in Burlington
- Novartis, in Cambridge (US headquarters)
- Novell, Inc., in Waltham
- Nuance Communications, in Burlington
- Oracle Corporation in Burlington
- Osram Sylvania in Danvers (headquarters)
- OutStart, Inc., in Boston (headquarters)
- Partners HealthCare (moving to Assembly Row, Somerville)
- Philips Healthcare, in Andover (global headquarters) and Framingham
- Philips Lighting in Burlington
- Philips Electronics North America, in Andover (regional headquarters)
- Progress Software in Bedford (headquarters)
- PTC (headquarters)
- Puma (North American headquarters, moving to Assembly Row, Somerville)
- Putnam Investments (headquarters)
- Rapid7
- Raytheon, in Waltham (headquarters)
- Red Hat, in Westford (engineering headquarters)
- Reebok (US headquarters)
- Reed & Barton in Taunton (factory and headquarters)
- Roku
- Saint-Gobain, in Worcester
- Sapient Corporation (headquarters)
- Schneider Electric, in Andover, Massachusetts
- Sepracor, Inc., in Marlborough (headquarters)
- SharkNinja, in Needham (headquarters)
- Sonesta International Hotels Corp. (headquarters)
- Staples, Inc., in Framingham (headquarters)
- State Street Corporation (headquarters)
- Steward Health Care System (headquarters)
- Stop & Shop, in Quincy (headquarters)
- SunSetter Products, LP, in Malden (headquarters)
- Teradyne, in North Reading (headquarters)
- Text, Inc., in Boston
- Thermo Fisher Scientific, in Waltham (headquarters)
- Threat Stack (headquarters)
- TJX Corporation, in Framingham (headquarters)
- Toast, Inc. (headquarters)
- TripAdvisor, LLC, in Needham (headquarters)
- Twitter, in Cambridge
- UniFirst, in Wilmington (headquarters)
- Vertex Pharmaceuticals (headquarters)
- Vistaprint, in Lexington (North American headquarters)
- Wayfair (headquarters)
- W. B. Mason, in Brockton (headquarters)
- Wellington Management Company (headquarters)
- Wolverine World Wide, in Waltham, Massachusetts (headquarters for Keds, Saucony, Sperry Top-Sider, and Stride Rite)
- Wyman-Gordon, in Grafton (complex metal components and products)
- Zipcar (headquarters)

== Transportation ==
=== Interstates ===
- I-84
- I-90
- I-93
- I-95
- I-190
- I-195
- I-290
- I-293
- I-295
- I-395
- I-495

=== U.S. Routes ===
- US 1
- US 3
- US 6
- US 20
- US 44
- US 202

=== State Highways ===
- Route 1A
- Route 2
- Route 2A
- Route 3
- Route 3A
- Route 4
- Route 6A
- Route 9
- Route 12
- Route 13
- Route 14
- Route 15
- Route 16
- Route 18
- Route 19
- Route 22
- Route 24
- Route 25
- Route 27
- Route 28
- Route 30
- Route 31
- Route 32
- Route 32A
- Route 35
- Route 36
- Route 37
- Route 38
- Route 39
- Route 40
- Route 49
- Route 53
- Route 56
- Route 58
- Route 60
- Route 62
- Route 67
- Route 68
- Route 70
- Route 79
- Route 80
- Route 81
- Route 85
- Route 88
- Route 96
- Route 97
- Route 98
- Route 99
- Route 101
- Route 103
- Route 104
- Route 105
- Route 106
- Route 107
- Route 108
- Route 109
- Route 110
- Route 111
- Route 112
- Route 113
- Route 114
- Route 114A
- Route 115
- Route 117
- Route 118
- Route 119
- Route 120
- Route 121
- Route 122
- Route 122A
- Route 123
- Route 124
- Route 125
- Route 126
- Route 127
- Route 127A
- Route 128
- Route 129
- Route 129A
- Route 130
- Route 131
- Route 132
- Route 133
- Route 134
- Route 135
- Route 136
- Route 137
- Route 138
- Route 139
- Route 140
- Route 145
- Route 146
- Route 146A
- Route 148
- Route 149
- Route 150
- Route 151
- Route 152
- Route 169
- Route 177
- Route 193
- Route 197
- Route 198
- Route 203
- Route 213
- Route 225
- Route 228
- Route 240
- Route 286

=== Bridges and tunnels ===
- Boston University Bridge, carrying Route 2
- Callahan Tunnel, carrying Route 1A Northbound
- Charles M. Braga Jr. Memorial Bridge, carrying Interstate 195
- Claiborne Pell Newport Bridge, carrying Route 138
- Fore River Bridge, carrying Massachusetts Route 3A
- Harvard Bridge, carrying Route 2A
- Longfellow Bridge, carrying Massachusetts Route 3, US Route 3, and the MBTA Red Line
- William Felton "Bill" Russell Bridge, carrying Route 99
- Sumner Tunnel, carrying Route 1A Southbound
- Ted Williams Tunnel, carrying I-90
- Thomas P. O'Neill Jr. Tunnel, carrying I-93 and Routes 1 and 3 concurrently
- Tobin Bridge, carrying Route 1
- Zakim Bunker Hill Bridge, carrying Interstate 93, Route 1 and Route 3 concurrently

=== Airports ===
- Logan International Airport in Boston, 3 miles (4.8 km) northeast of downtown Boston, New England's largest transportation center
- Manchester–Boston Regional Airport in Manchester, New Hampshire
- T. F. Green Airport in Warwick, Rhode Island
- Hanscom Field in Bedford
- Norwood Memorial Airport
- Worcester Regional Airport
- Beverly Regional Airport
- Lawrence Municipal Airport

=== Rail and bus ===
The MBTA district, with Commuter Rail lines in purple

The Massachusetts Bay Transportation Authority (MBTA) is the primary operator of transit in Greater Boston. It operates the MBTA subway system and the MBTA bus network in Boston and inner suburbs, as well as the MBTA Commuter Rail system and the MBTA ferry network serving Greater Boston.

Other public transit includes Amtrak intercity rail service, Logan Express service to Logan International Airport, and privately-operated intercity bus and ferry systems. A number of regional transit authorities operate local bus service:

- Brockton Area Transit Authority
- Cape Ann Transportation Authority
- Greater Attleboro Taunton Regional Transit Authority
- Lowell Regional Transit Authority
- Merrimack Valley Regional Transit Authority
- MetroWest Regional Transit Authority
- Montachusett Regional Transit Authority
- Rhode Island Public Transit Authority
- Worcester Regional Transit Authority

=== Ocean transportation ===
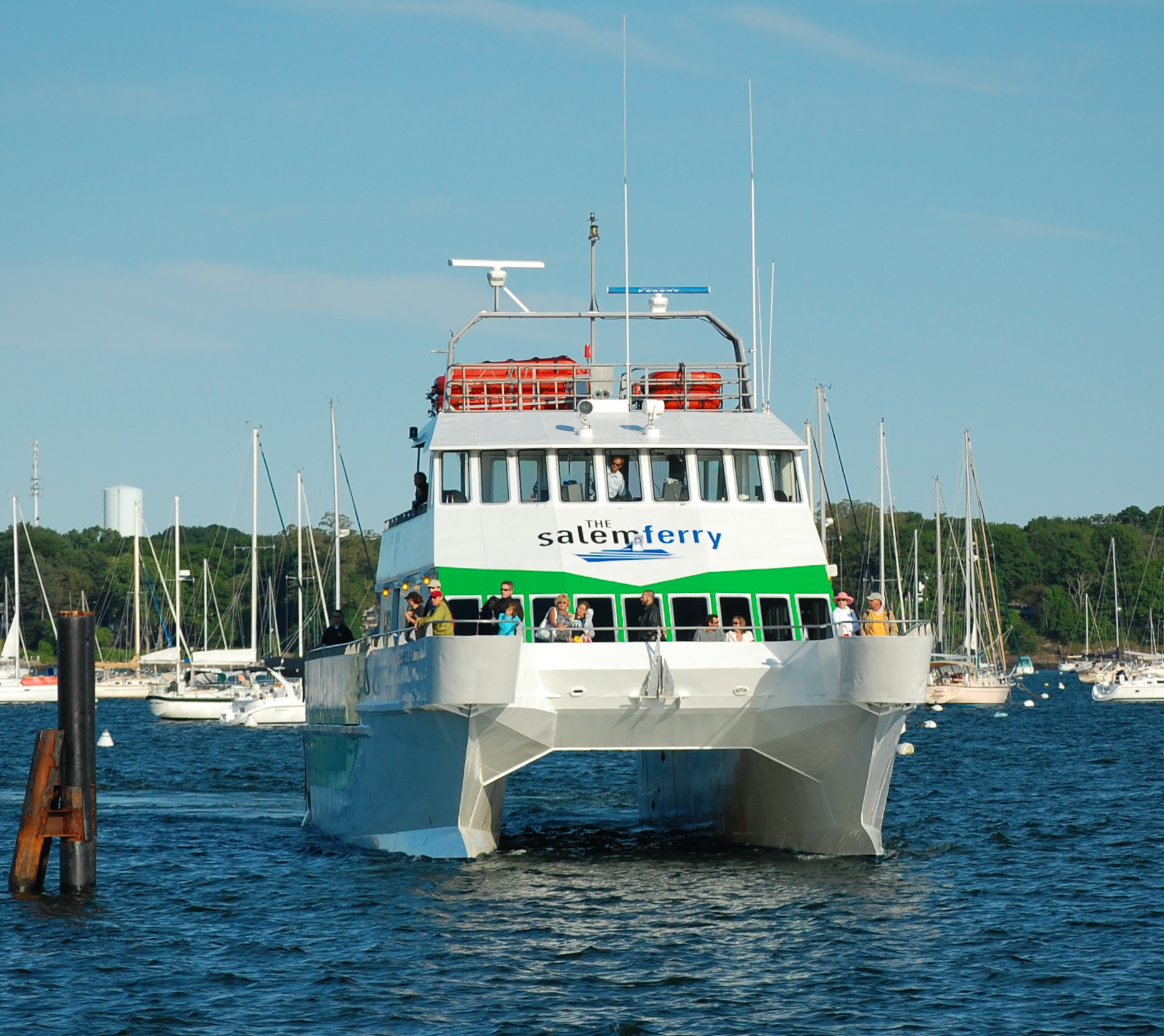
The Salem Ferry, 92 ft. Catamaran is photographed approaching its dock off Blaney Street at the Salem Maritime National Historic Site in Salem, Massachusetts, United States.

- Port of Boston (Massport)
- Cape Cod Canal

== Sports ==
Club	Sport	League	Stadium	Established	League titles
Boston Bruins	Ice hockey	National Hockey League	TD Garden (Boston)	1924	6 Stanley Cups; 7 Eastern Conference Titles
Boston Celtics	Basketball	National Basketball Association	TD Garden (Boston)	1946	18 NBA Championships; 23 Eastern Conference Titles
Boston Red Sox	Baseball	Major League Baseball	Fenway Park (Boston)	1901	9 MLB World Series Championships; 14 American League Pennants
New England Patriots	Football	National Football League	Gillette Stadium (Foxborough)	1960	6 Super Bowl Championships; 11 AFC Championships
New England Revolution	Soccer	Major League Soccer	Gillette Stadium (Foxborough)	1996	1 US Open Cup; 1 Supporters' Shield
New England Free Jacks	Rugby union	Major League Rugby	Veterans Memorial Stadium (Quincy)	2018	2 MLR Championships
Boston Legacy FC	Soccer	National Women's Soccer League	Gillette Stadium (Foxborough)	2023	0 NWSL Challenge Cup
Boston Fleet	Ice hockey	Professional Women's Hockey League	Agganis Arena (Boston)	2023	0 Walter Cups;

Annual sporting events include:

- The Boston Marathon, which follows a course from Hopkinton to Boston
- The Head of the Charles Regatta
- The Lenox Industrial Tools 301, Sylvania 300 and New Hampshire Indy 225 auto races at the New Hampshire Motor Speedway oval track.

The Greater Boston League, a high school athletic conference in Massachusetts.
