= WRRS =

WRRS may refer to:

- WRRS (FM), a radio station (88.5 FM) licensed to serve Bayview, Massachusetts, United States
- WRRS-LP, a low-power radio station (104.3 FM) licensed to serve Pittsfield, Massachusetts
- WPMW, a radio station (88.5 FM) licensed to serve Middleborough Center, Massachusetts, United States, which used the call sign WRRS from October 2010 to August 2023
- WXJC-FM, a radio station (101.1 FM) licensed to serve Cullman, Alabama, United States, which used the call sign WRRS from November 1998 to July 2002
- The ICAO code for Sumbawa Besar Airport in Sumbawa, West Nusa Tenggara, Indonesia
- Western Railroad Supply Company, a former U.S grade crossing signal manufacturer.
