= WESO =

- Southbridge, Massachusetts; United States
- Broadcast area: South County
- Frequency: 970 kHz
- Branding: The Station of the Cross

Programming
- Format: Catholic radio
- Network: The Station of the Cross
- Affiliations: EWTN Radio

Ownership
- Owner: Holy Family Communications
- Sister stations: WNEB

History
- First air date: March 20, 1955
- Call sign meaning: Webster-Southbridge

Technical information
- Licensing authority: FCC
- Facility ID: 18309
- Class: D
- Power: 1,000 watts (day); 21 watts (night)
- Transmitter coordinates: 42°3′59.35″N 71°59′26.27″W
- Translator: (101.1 MHz) W266DK (Southbridge)

Links
- Public license information: Public file; LMS
- Webcast: Listen live
- Website: thestationofthecross.com/stations/southbridge-ma/

WESO (970 AM) is a radio station licensed to Southbridge, Massachusetts, United States. Established in 1955, it broadcasting a Catholic radio format, simulcasting sister station WNEB in Worcester. WESO is owned by Holy Family Communications, and operates as part of The Station of the Cross.

== History ==
WESO broadcast a country music format as "The Spirit 970" until October 2008, when the station began to simulcast the business talk programming of then-sister station WBNW in Concord. On June 13, 2014, Money Matters Radio, Inc. reached a deal to sell WESO to Emmanuel Communications, Inc., the owner of WNEB. The deal closed on August 29, 2014, at a purchase price of $250,000. Following the sale, WESO was converted to noncommercial operation and began to carry WNEB's "Emmanuel Radio" programming, which included programming from EWTN Radio.

Holy Family Communications, owner of WQOM in Natick and stations in New York, Pennsylvania, and Ohio, began operating WESO and WNEB under a local marketing agreement on January 1, 2022. The stations became part of Holy Family's The Station of the Cross network. In early 2024, Holy Family bought the stations outright for $1,000.

Holy Family announced its plans to sell WESO, WNEB and WACE in Chicopee to Journey for Life Media for $150,000 in May 2025; the sale was withdrawn that August. Holy Family subsequently reached a deal to sell WESO to Daniel Becker's TLM Communications; that deal was also withdrawn in January 2026. In June 2026, a deal was reached to sell WESO to Kurt Jackson's Quinebaug Valley Broadcasting, whose existing holdings in the area include WQVD and WQVR, for $65,000.

== Translator ==
Call sign	Frequency	City of license	FID	ERP (W)	Class	Transmitter coordinates	FCC info
W266DK	101.1 FM	Southbridge, Massachusetts	200926	250	D	42°3′59.3″N 71°59′26.3″W	LMS
