= WNEB =

- Worcester, Massachusetts; United States
- Broadcast area: Worcester, Massachusetts
- Frequency: 1230 kHz
- Branding: The Station of the Cross

Programming
- Format: Catholic radio
- Network: The Station of the Cross
- Affiliations: EWTN Radio

Ownership
- Owner: Holy Family Communications
- Sister stations: WESO

History
- First air date: December 16, 1946
- Call sign meaning: Original owner New England Broadcasting

Technical information
- Licensing authority: FCC
- Facility ID: 249
- Class: C
- Power: 1,000 watts (unlimited)
- Transmitter coordinates: 42°16′23.34″N 71°49′21.26″W

Links
- Public license information: Public file; LMS
- Webcast: Listen live
- Website: thestationofthecross.com/stations/worcester-ma/

WNEB (1230 AM) is a Catholic radio station broadcasting religious programming. Licensed to Worcester, Massachusetts, United States, the station serves the Worcester area. The station is owned by Holy Family Communications, and operates as part of The Station of the Cross.

== History ==
WNEB signed on December 16, 1946, under the ownership of the New England Broadcasting Company. It was Worcester's fourth radio station (after WTAG, WORC, and WAAB), and its first independent station. New England Broadcasting, owned by John Hurley, sold the station to George Steffy and Harold Glidden in 1960; around this time, WNEB had a middle of the road (MOR) format. Its independent status ended in 1963, when the station joined the CBS Radio Network.

Glidden took full control of WNEB in 1975, shortly after Steffy's death; soon afterward, the station shifted to a country music format. The CBS affiliation had also ceased by this time, and moved to WAAB. Two years later, WNEB was sold to Segal Broadcasting. Segal reverted the station to MOR and affiliated it with the ABC Entertainment network. WNEB shifted to a big band format in 1981; the next year, it rejoined CBS. AAMAR Communications bought the station in 1986. Financial problems soon forced AAMAR to file for Chapter 11 bankruptcy protection on December 4, 1990; on August 23, 1991, WNEB went dark.

Bob Bittner, owner of WJIB in Cambridge, purchased WNEB in 1994, and brought the station back on the air October 24, 1996, with a simulcast of WJIB's beautiful music format. A year later, Bittner sold the station to Heirwaves, Inc., which relaunched the station with a contemporary Christian music format on November 29, 1997. Heirwaves sold WNEB to Great Commission Broadcasting in 1999, which implemented a simulcast of similarly formatted WJLT from Natick (which Great Commission programmed at that time) soon afterward. Great Commission later changed its name to Grace Broadcasting.

A financial dispute with Windsor Financial Corporation led to Windsor assuming control of WNEB's license in 2003. The station's format and staff then migrated to WYCM (90.1 FM) (its station manager, Stephen Binley, had founded Heirwaves and remained with WNEB after the sale to Great Commission), and Windsor operated WNEB with an automated contemporary Christian music format for several months before switching it to a simulcast of Leicester's WVNE (760 AM), a religious station owned by Blount Communications, that fall; as WVNE is a daytimer, WNEB continued the format on its own during that station's off-air hours. Blount bought WNEB outright soon afterward.

WNEB began moving away from religious programming in June 2007 with the addition of The Sean Hannity Show; in March 2008, it switched to a full-time conservative talk format. This format ended in April 2009, and the station went silent for one week before the launch of a Spanish language talk format, also incorporating some inspirational music, on May 4.

Blount sold WNEB to Emmanuel Communications, with plans to relaunch the station with Catholic radio programming, in October 2010. Upon taking over on January 14, 2011, WNEB temporarily left the air once more while relocating to new studios; it returned to the air with the new format on May 1. As with most Catholic radio stations, WNEB was an EWTN Radio affiliate, though it intended to produce some local programming as well. Emmanuel Communications acquired a second station, WESO in Southbridge, in 2014.

Holy Family Communications, owner of WQOM in Natick and stations in New York, Pennsylvania, and Ohio, began operating WNEB and WESO under a local marketing agreement on January 1, 2022. The stations became part of Holy Family's The Station of the Cross network. In early 2024, Holy Family bought the stations outright for $1,000. Holy Family agreed to sell WNEB, WESO, and WACE in Chicopee to Journey For Life Media for $150,000 in May 2025; the sale was withdrawn that August.
