= North County (disambiguation) =

North County refers to the northern part of San Diego County, California, United States.

North County may also refer to:

== Places ==
=== United States ===
- North County (Massachusetts), another name for Massachusetts' Montachusett Region, located in the northern Worcester County
- North County, Jefferson Territory, an historic county (1859–1861) in the extralegal U.S. territory of Jefferson (present-day Colorado)
- North County, the northwestern corner of Alameda County, California containing the cities of Oakland and Berkeley
- North County, a name for the north part of St. Louis County, Missouri
- North County, the northern part of Prince George's County, Maryland (part of the D.C. metro area)

=== Ireland ===
- North County Dublin, an area north of Dublin:
  - North Dublin (UK Parliament constituency), historic UK Parliament constituency representing the area (1885–1922)
  - Dublin County North, historic Irish Dáil Éireann constituency representing the area (1969–1981)

== Media ==
- North County Times, formerly the primary newspaper of northern San Diego County, sold in 2012
