= WXOX =

WXOX may refer to:

- WXOX-LP, a low-power radio station (97.1 FM) licensed in Louisville, Kentucky
- WJMK (AM), a radio station (1250 AM) licensed to Bridgeport, Michigan, United States, which held the call sign WXOX from 1962 to 1996
- WTCL-LD, a low-power television station (channel 20, virtual 6) licensed to Cleveland, Ohio, United States, which held the call sign WXOX-LP from 2000 to 2012
- WLOF, a radio station (101.7 FM) licensed to Elma, New York, United States, which held the call sign WXOX from 1998 to 1999
