= WBIV =

WBIV may refer to:

- WBIV-LP, a low-powered television station (channel 38) licensed to Saint Thomas, U.S. Virgin Islands which broadcast from 1992 to 2012
- WLKK, a radio station (107.7 FM) licensed to serve Wethersfield, New York, which held the call sign WBIV from 1960 to 1982
- WQOM, a radio station (1060 AM) licensed to Natick, Massachusetts, which held the call sign WBIV from 1987 to 1995
