= The Station of the Cross =

- Type: Catholic radio network
- Country: United States
- First air date: August 15, 1999
- Availability: See § Current stations
- Headquarters: Williamsville, New York
- Broadcast area: New York; Pennsylvania; Ohio; Massachusetts
- Owner: Holy Family Communications
- Official website: thestationofthecross.com

The Station of the Cross is a network of Catholic radio stations owned and operated by Holy Family Communications. It is an affiliate of the EWTN Global Catholic Radio network.

== Current stations ==
Call sign	Frequency	City	State	Start date	Ref(s)
WACE	730 AM	Springfield	Massachusetts	January 23, 2023	
WPMW	88.5 FM	Middleborough Center	Massachusetts	2023	
WQOM	1060 AM	Boston	Massachusetts	November 1, 2010	
WESO	970 AM	Southbridge	Massachusetts	January 1, 2022	
WNEB	1230 AM	Worcester	Massachusetts	January 1, 2022	
WLOF	101.7 FM	Buffalo	New York	August 15, 1999	
WMTQ	88.1 FM	Elmira–Corning	New York	February 7, 2011	
WTMI	88.7 FM	Syracuse	New York	April 2012	
W263CZ	100.5 FM	Olean	New York	c. late 2021	
WHVM	91.9 FM	Owego	New York	—N/a	
WHIC	1460 AM	Rochester	New York	July 1, 2003	
WGGO	1590 AM	Salamanca	New York	c. late 2021	
WMIH	89.5 FM	Geneva	Ohio	—N/a	
W221DI	92.1 FM	Erie	Pennsylvania	—N/a	
WQHE	88.3 FM	Oil City	Pennsylvania	—N/a	

== Former stations ==
Call sign	Frequency	City	State	Start date	End date	Ref(s)
WRRS	88.5 FM	New Bedford	Massachusetts	2023	2024	
W203AW	88.5 FM	Fredonia	New York	—N/a	August 2004	
WLGU	90.7 FM	Lancaster	New York	—N/a	August 2004	
WLOA	1470 AM	Farrell	Pennsylvania	March 4, 2003	July 7, 2005	
WQOR	750 AM	Olyphant	Pennsylvania	June 17, 2003	April 1, 2008	
WITK	1550 AM	Pittston	Pennsylvania	May 29, 2005	September 1, 2007	
