= WHEC-TV =

Television station in Rochester, New York

- Rochester, New York; United States
- Channels: Digital: 10 (VHF); Virtual: 10
- Branding: News 10 NBC

Programming
- Affiliations: 10.1: NBC; for others, see § Subchannels

Ownership
- Owner: Hubbard Broadcasting; (WHEC-TV, LLC)

History
- Founded: March 11, 1953
- First air date: November 1, 1953
- Former call signs: WVET-TV (shared operation, 1953–1961)
- Former channel numbers: Analog: 10 (VHF, 1953–2009); Digital: 58 (UHF, 2002–2009)
- Former affiliations: CBS (1953–1989); ABC (secondary, 1953–1962); United (secondary, 1967)
- Call sign meaning: Hickson Electric Company (founders of WHEC radio)

Technical information
- Licensing authority: FCC
- Facility ID: 70041
- ERP: 18.1 kW
- HAAT: 153 m (502 ft)
- Transmitter coordinates: 43°8′8.3″N 77°35′1.3″W

Links
- Public license information: Public file; LMS
- Website: www.whec.com

WHEC-TV (channel 10) is a television station in Rochester, New York, United States, affiliated with NBC. Owned by Hubbard Broadcasting, the station maintains studios on East Avenue in Downtown Rochester and a transmitter on Pinnacle Hill in Brighton.

== History ==
Logo used by WHEC from 1979 to 1995 in its original form. The lines outside the "10" were removed in 1987; the lines inside the "10" were reduced to five in 1993.

In March 1953, the Federal Communications Commission (FCC) awarded the construction permit of Rochester's second VHF station to two local firms who competed for the open channel. In what was the first arrangement of its kind, the Gannett Company, then the Rochester-based publisher of the Democrat and Chronicle and the Times-Union and owners of CBS Radio Network affiliate WHEC (1460 AM, now WHIC); and the Veterans Broadcasting Company, owners of WVET radio (1280 AM, now WHTK), were granted shared operation of channel 10; the two separately owned stations would use the same broadcast license and transmitter, but broadcast from separate studios.

Both stations–Veterans-owned WVET-TV, based at the Central Trust Building; and Gannett-owned WHEC-TV, with studios at the Rochester Savings Bank building, both in downtown Rochester–commenced operations on November 1, 1953. The combined channel 10 operation carried a primary affiliation with the CBS Television Network, and also carried ABC programs on a secondary basis. The WHEC stations moved from the Bank of Rochester building to WHEC-TV's present location, on East Avenue, in May 1958.

On November 15, 1961, the split-channel, shared-time arrangement ended as Veterans sold its half of channel 10 to Gannett. Veterans subsequently acquired its own, fully owned station, WROC-TV (then on channel 5) from Transcontinent Broadcasting. The completion of the deal made WHEC-TV the sole occupant of the channel 10 frequency in Rochester. The following year WHEC-TV became a full-time CBS affiliate, as the ABC affiliation moved to newly signed-on WOKR (channel 13, now WHAM-TV). In 1966, channel 10 was one of the founding members of the "Love Network" that aired the Jerry Lewis MDA Telethon every Labor Day until 2012, when it moved from first-run syndication to ABC as a short-form telecast and was renamed the MDA Show of Strength, and ended in 2014 when MDA discontinued the event on May 1, 2015. WHEC-TV was the creator of the "cut-ins" that local stations insert into the national telethon, a concept that later since spread across the country.

Gannett split up its radio/TV holdings in 1971 when WHEC radio was sold to Sande Broadcasting, a locally based group (the station is now known as WHIC). Channel 10 was allowed to retain the WHEC-TV call letters and would remain as the Gannett Company's lone broadcast holding until 1979 when Gannett sold the station in the wake of its purchase of Combined Communications. Gannett feared the FCC, who several years earlier decided to eliminate several small-market print/broadcast ownership combinations, would force it to sell either the television station or the newspaper. Gannett netted a handsome return on its purchase of WHEC radio in 1932. It retained both the Democrat and Chronicle and the Times-Union, the latter of which was merged into the former in 1997. Gannett continues to publish the Democrat and Chronicle as of 2020, though the company relocated its headquarters from Rochester to the Northern Virginia suburbs of Washington, D.C. in 1985.

The new owners of channel 10, made U.S. television history: WHEC-TV became the first VHF, network-affiliated station to be purchased and wholly owned by an African-American group, led by investor Ragan Henry. Despite the historical connotation, the Henry-led group's stewardship of WHEC-TV would be short-lived. In 1983, the Henry group traded channel 10 to the original Viacom in exchange for a pair of radio stations, WDIA in Memphis and KDIA in Oakland.

Under Viacom ownership, channel 10 took part in another trade—this one the first (and only) network affiliation switch in Rochester. On April 6, 1989, WHEC-TV announced that it would join the NBC network, replacing WROC-TV (now on channel 8) in the Peacock Network's roster. This move was the result of WROC-TV's poor performance and constant preemptions of NBC network programming (NBC was very intolerant of preemptions at this time). The swap brought channel 10 in-line with sister stations WNYT in Albany and WVIT in New Britain, Connecticut, which had recently renewed their NBC relationships. In addition, NBC's strong prime time programming—NBC was the most-watched network at the time, while CBS was in a distant third near the midpoint of the Laurence Tisch era—was another major factor. WROC-TV began airing Saturday morning programs and some daytime programs from CBS shortly after WHEC-TV announced its intent to affiliate with NBC, but the network switch did not take effect until August 13, 1989, which was the day after WHEC-TV's affiliation contract with CBS expired.

Viacom purchased Paramount Pictures in 1994, placing its five-station group (WHEC-TV, WNYT, WVIT, KMOV in St. Louis, and KSLA-TV in Shreveport, Louisiana) under common ownership with the Paramount Stations Group; the two groups were formally consolidated in December 1995. Shortly thereafter, the merged company decided to divest itself of all of its major network affiliates to focus on stations that carried its then-upstart United Paramount Network (UPN). In June 1996, Viacom/Paramount agreed to trade WHEC-TV and WNYT to Hubbard Broadcasting in return for UPN affiliate WTOG in St. Petersburg, Florida; WVIT wound up being purchased outright by NBC.

== News operation ==
WHEC-DT airs more than 33 hours of locally produced newscasts each week (with 5 1/2 hours each weekday and three hours each on Saturdays and Sundays).

The WHEC news team won the New York Emmy Award for best newscast in April 2018 and the National Edward R. Murrow award for Best Newscast in June 2018.

=== Notable former on-air staff ===
- Rich Funke – reporter/anchor (1974–2012). Served as Republican 55th District New York State Senator (2015–2020).
- Steve Scully – anchor, reporter (1980s). Now with C-SPAN.

== Controversy ==
On November 21, 1982, WHEC-TV was the subject of a controversial decision when then-general manager Steven Kronquest decided to air a pre-recorded high school football championship game on the station instead of the New York Giants–Washington Redskins NFL game that was televised live by CBS. The decision angered many Giants fans in the region and cost the station around $3,600. However, the game would air that day on rival station and ABC affiliate WOKR with permission from CBS and the NFL.

== Technical information ==
=== Subchannels ===
The station's signal is multiplexed:

Subchannels of WHEC-TV
Subchannel	Res.	Short name	Programming
10.1	1080i	NBC HD	NBC
10.2	480i	MeTV	MeTV (4:3)
10.3	480i	StartTV	Start TV (4:3)
10.4	480i	ION	Ion (4:3)
10.5	480i	H & I	Heroes & Icons
10.6	480i	Grit	Grit
10.7	480i	IONPlus	Ion Plus

=== Analog-to-digital conversion ===
WHEC-TV's digital signal on UHF channel 58 signed-on September 27, 2002, under a special temporary authority.

WHEC-TV ended regular programming on its analog signal, over VHF channel 10, on June 12, 2009, the official date on which full-power television in the United States transitioned from analog to digital broadcasts under federal mandate. The station's digital signal relocated from its pre-transition UHF channel 58, which was among the high band UHF channels (52-69) that were removed from broadcasting use as a result of the transition, to its analog-era VHF channel 10.

== Coverage in Canada ==
For many years, WHEC-TV was one of three Rochester area stations offered on cable in the Ottawa–Gatineau and Eastern Ontario regions. The Rochester area stations were replaced with Detroit stations when the microwave relay system that provided these signals was discontinued. WHEC-TV and other Rochester stations were available on cable in several communities along the north shore of Lake Ontario such as Belleville and Cobourg, Ontario. All Rochester affiliates with the exception of Fox affiliate WUHF (channel 31) were replaced with Buffalo stations in January 2009.
