= WACE (AM) =

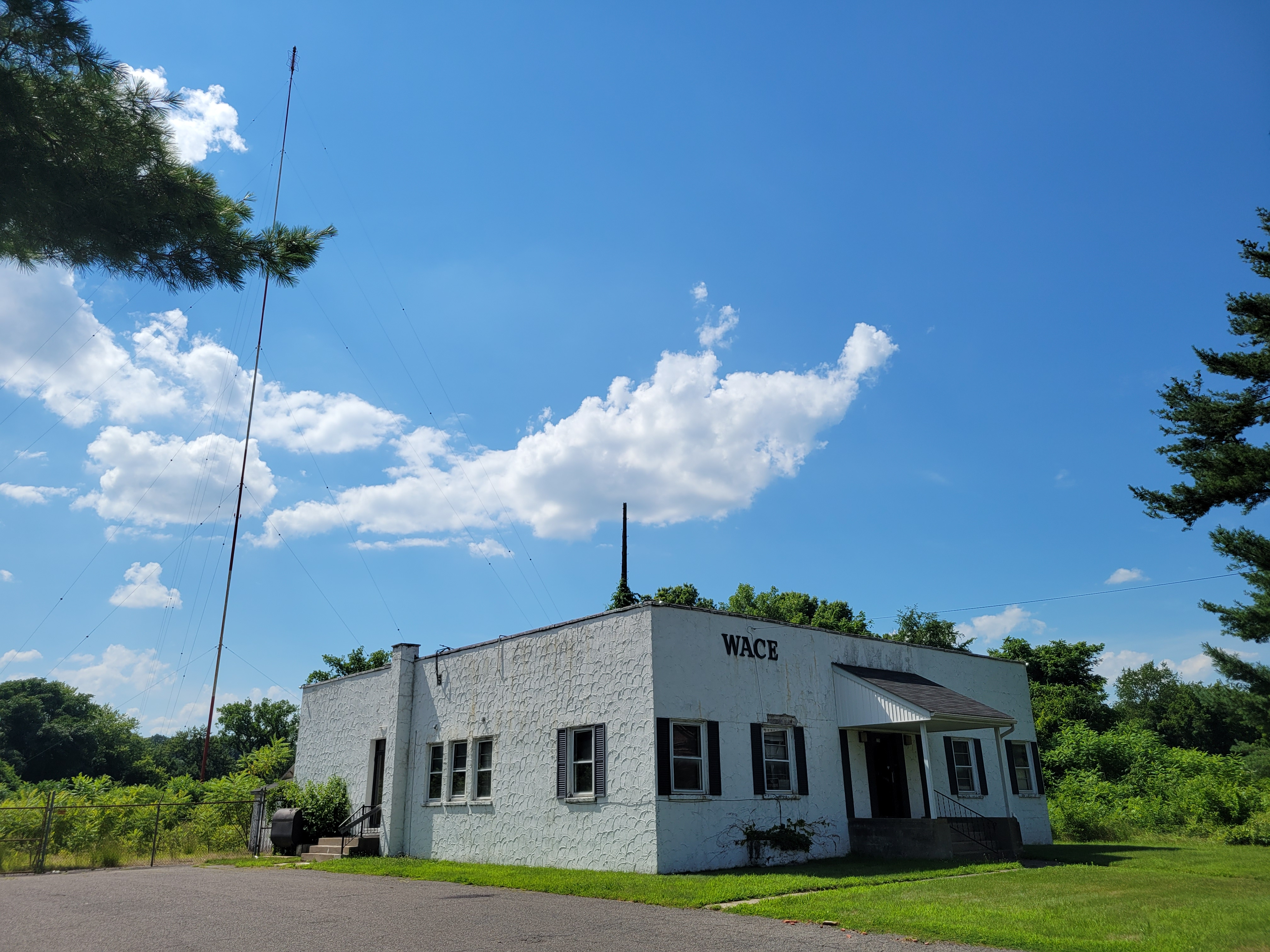
- Former studios and transmitter
- Chicopee, Massachusetts; United States
- Broadcast area: Springfield metropolitan area
- Frequency: 730 kHz
- Branding: The Station of the Cross

Programming
- Format: Catholic radio
- Network: The Station of the Cross
- Affiliations: EWTN Radio

Ownership
- Owner: Holy Family Communications

History
- First air date: December 1, 1946

Technical information
- Licensing authority: FCC
- Facility ID: 9194
- Class: D
- Power: 5,000 watts (day); 7 watts (night)
- Transmitter coordinates: 42°6′33.34″N 72°36′38.32″W

Links
- Public license information: Public file; LMS
- Webcast: Listen live
- Website: thestationofthecross.com/stations/springfield-ma/

WACE (730 kHz) is an AM radio station broadcasting a Catholic radio format. Licensed to Chicopee, Massachusetts, the station serves the Springfield radio market and has been permitted to identify itself as "Chicopee-Springfield" since 1969. The station is owned by Holy Family Communications, and operates as part of its The Station of the Cross network. EWTN Radio programming is also heard.

By day, WACE transmits 5,000 watts, using a non-directional antenna. AM 730 is a clear channel frequency reserved for Canada and Mexico. To avoid interference with other stations, WACE must reduce power at night to 7 watts. The transmitter is off West Street in Springfield, near the North End Bridge and the Connecticut River.

== History ==
=== Early years ===
WACE signed on the air on December 1, 1946. It was owned by the Regional Broadcasting Company with studios on Chicopee Street in Chicopee. The station broadcast at 1,000 watts by day.

Because AM 730 is a clear channel frequency, reserved for CKAC in Montreal and XEX in Mexico City, WACE was a daytimer, signing off at sunset to prevent interference. In the 1960s, the daytime power was increased to 5,000 watts. While it remained a daytime-only station, its pre-sunrise power of 8 watts enabled the station to be heard as far away as Hartford, due to the transmitter's location on the banks of the Connecticut River and the low frequency on the AM band. (In 1986 the station was allowed to operate at 7 watts at night as well.) At full power the signal could be heard as distantly as Rhode Island.

=== Oldies and all-news ===
During the 1970s, the station broadcast a popular oldies format. One of its personalities was Charlie (Ahl) Day, later of WCBS-FM in New York and WOMC in Detroit. Another disc jockey was Mike Adams, for many years a popular sports-talk radio and TV host in Boston. The station also featured a three-hour morning news block anchored by Day and Don Yankee. In 1977, Ace Broadcasting bought the station.

As music listening shifted to FM radio, the new owners ended the oldies sound. The station tried an all-news radio format, as a network affiliate of CBS Radio News.

=== Religious radio ===
The news format did not last very long. By 1980, WACE was airing a brokered religious format, where national preachers bought blocks of time on the station to discuss their faith and seek donations.

On May 1, 2022, WACE went off the air. The station filed with the FCC for special temporary authority (STA) to stay silent for a while. The request was to relocate to a new transmitter site using the tower that WMAS-FM, WHLL and W251CT were using. In August 2022, Holy Family Communications, a Roman Catholic broadcaster behind The Station of the Cross Network, agreed to purchase the station from Carter Broadcasting. Holy Family relaunched WACE as part of its Catholic radio network on January 23, 2023.

In May 2025, Holy Family agreed to sell WACE, WNEB in Worcester, and WESO in Southbridge to Journey For Life Media for $150,000. The sale was withdrawn that August.
