= WMTQ =

Coordinates: 42.106°N 76.871°W

- United States
- Broadcast area: Elmira, New York
- Frequency: 88.1 MHz
- Branding: The Station of the Cross

Programming
- Format: Religious (Catholic)

Ownership
- Owner: Holy Family Communications

History
- First air date: February 7, 2011
- Call sign meaning: "Mary The Queen"

Technical information
- Licensing authority: FCC
- Class: A
- ERP: 90 watts
- HAAT: 372 meters (1,220 ft)

Links
- Public license information: Public file; LMS
- Webcast: Listen live
- Website: thestationofthecross.com/stations/elmira-ny/

WMTQ is a Catholic radio station broadcasting from Elmira, New York. WMTQ is located at 88.1 on the FM dial. Part of The Station of the Cross, WMTQ is owned and operated by Holy Family Communications which also owns and operates several other stations. The call letters represent Mary the Queen, to whom this station is dedicated. The Station of the Cross relies on the EWTN for the bulk of its programming.

== History ==
WHOM had the WMTQ callsign from 1973 until it became WHOM in 1976.

"On October 29, 2010, the Dominican Monastery of Mary the Queen filed an application with the Federal Communications Commission to obtain permission to assign to Holy Family Communications its Permit to Construct a Noncommercial Educational Radio Station, WMTQ, to serve Elmira, NY and surrounding areas. The application proposes a Class A FM station operating at 372 meters height above average terrain with 90 watts effective radiated power from 42-6-21.7 N and 76-52-17.1 W."
