= WRRS (FM) =

- Bayview, Massachusetts; United States
- Broadcast area: South Coast
- Frequency: 88.5 MHz
- Branding: The Station of the Cross

Programming
- Language: English
- Format: Catholic religion
- Network: The Station of the Cross
- Affiliations: EWTN radio

Ownership
- Owner: Holy Family Communications

History
- First air date: March 25, 2011; 15 years ago
- Former call signs: WPMW (2009–2023)

Technical information
- Licensing authority: FCC
- Facility ID: 175689
- Class: A
- ERP: 140 watts
- HAAT: 54.1 meters (177 ft)
- Transmitter coordinates: 41°38′22.6″N 71°58′4.9″W

Links
- Public license information: Public file; LMS
- Webcast: Listen live
- Website: thestationofthecross.com

WRRS (88.5 FM) is a radio station licensed to serve Bayview, Massachusetts. WRRS is owned by Holy Family Communications and airs a Catholic religious format as part of The Station of the Cross. WRRS is an affiliate of EWTN radio.

== History ==
The Academy of the Immaculate applied for a construction permit for a new station in Bayview, Massachusetts, near New Bedford, in a late 2007 window for new noncommercial radio stations. The new station, which took on the call sign WPMW, would be operated by the Franciscan Friars of the Immaculate, and intended to carry programming from EWTN Radio, Relevant Radio, and Ave Maria Radio. Test broadcasts began in December 2010; WPMW, branded "Radio CorMariae", would formally launch on March 25, 2011, primarily airing EWTN Radio but with plans for local programming.

The Academy of the Immaculate purchased a second station on 88.5 in southeastern Massachusetts, WRRS in Middleborough Center, for $85,000 in 2011. The two stations, along with WHVM in Oswego, New York (which had been owned by the affiliated Mt. St. Francis Hermitage), were acquired by Holy Family Communications for $75,000 in 2023. WPMW and WRRS swapped call signs on August 15, 2023.
