= WLOF =

- Elma, New York; United States
- Broadcast area: Buffalo metropolitan area
- Frequency: 101.7 MHz
- Branding: The Station of the Cross

Programming
- Format: Catholic radio
- Affiliations: EWTN Radio

Ownership
- Owner: Holy Family Communications
- Sister stations: WHIC

History
- First air date: November 9, 1977
- Former call signs: WBTF (1977–1998); WXOX (1998–1999)
- Call sign meaning: Our Lady of Fatima

Technical information
- Licensing authority: FCC
- Facility ID: 31812
- Class: A
- ERP: 2,800 watts
- HAAT: 148 meters (486 ft)
- Transmitter coordinates: 42.783°N 78.458°W
- Repeater: 90.7 WLGU (Lancaster)

Links
- Public license information: Public file; LMS
- Webcast: Listen live
- Website: thestationofthecross.com/stations/buffalo-ny/

WLOF (101.7 FM) is a non-commercial radio station licensed to Elma, New York, and serving the Buffalo metropolitan area. It broadcasts a Catholic radio format; referred to as The Station of the Cross, WLOF is owned and operated by Holy Family Communications. The call sign represent Our Lady of Fatima, to whom this station is dedicated.

WLOF has an effective radiated power (ERP) of 2,800 watts. Programming is simulcast on WHIC in Rochester, New York, and WLGU in Lancaster, New York. The stations rely on the EWTN Global Catholic Radio Network for much of their programming.

== History ==
The station signed on the air on November 9, 1977. The original call letters were WBTF and it called itself "BT Country," airing a country music format. It was the sister station to WBTA 1490 AM in Batavia, New York. WBTF was originally licensed to Attica.

Beginning on February 13, 1998, 101.7 FM was acquired by Broben Communications, Inc. and used WXOX as its call sign. WXOX then required nearby station WHUG in Jamestown to change frequencies in an effort to gain coverage area. As WXOX, the station broadcast modern rock as "The Spot", supposedly covering "Attica, Amherst and Buffalo" and acting as a challenger to WEDG. It made a significant advertising blitz in the Buffalo media market and even created its own "Spotfest" music festival, but it never even registered a measurable audience in the ratings. WXOX had a weak signal in Buffalo and Niagara Falls.

On August 15, 1999, Holy Family Communications acquired WXOX and began broadcasting Catholic programming as WLOF. It became the sixth Catholic radio station in the United States.

On August 15, 2009, WLOF celebrated its tenth anniversary by hosting Fr. John Corapi, a member of the Society of Our Lady of the Most Holy Trinity (SOLT), at the HSBC Arena in Buffalo, New York. Over 11,000 people attended this celebration.

By 2024, WLOF had acquired a closer signal to Buffalo on FM 90.7, which it granted the call sign WLGU (for Our Lady of Guadalupe). In August of that year, Holy Family Communications opted to keep WLOF instead and spin WLGU (along with a translator in Fredonia) off to CSN International.
