= WPMW =

- Middleborough Center, Massachusetts; United States
- Frequency: 88.5 MHz
- Branding: The Station of the Cross

Programming
- Language: English
- Format: Catholic radio
- Network: The Station of the Cross
- Affiliations: EWTN Radio

Ownership
- Owner: Holy Family Communications
- Sister stations: WRRS

History
- First air date: April 27, 2012; 13 years ago
- Former call signs: WRRS (2010–2023)

Technical information
- Licensing authority: FCC
- Facility ID: 177016
- Class: A
- ERP: 60 watts
- HAAT: 80 meters (260 ft)
- Transmitter coordinates: 41°54′43.1″N 70°52′13.5″W

Links
- Public license information: Public file; LMS
- Webcast: Listen live
- Website: thestationofthecross.com/stations/middleborough-center-ma/

WPMW is an FM radio station licensed to Middleborough Center, Massachusetts, and is owned by Holy Family Communications. WPMW operates with 400 watts on 88.5 MHz. It broadcasts programming from The Station of the Cross, a Catholic radio network.

== History ==
The station was granted the call sign WRRS on October 29, 2010. It began broadcasting in 2012 with programming from the Talking Information Center, a radio reading service for blind people normally heard on FM subcarriers. WRRS went silent as of December 28, 2016, but returned to the air December 22, 2017.

On October 1, 2021, it was announced that WRRS would be sold by Talking Information Center, Incorporated to the Academy of the Immaculate for $85,000. Academy of the Immaculate owned WPMW, also on 88.5 MHz. The sale was consummated on November 29, 2021.

Effective March 20, 2023, WRRS and WPMW were sold to Holy Family Communications for $150,000. The two stations swapped call signs on August 15, 2023.
