= WYQQ =

Christian contemporary hit radio station in Charlton, Massachusetts

- Charlton, Massachusetts; United States
- Broadcast area: South County
- Frequency: 90.1 MHz
- Branding: The Q 90.1

Programming
- Language: English
- Format: Christian contemporary hit radio

Ownership
- Owner: Epic Light Network, Inc.

History
- First air date: 1976
- Former call signs: WBPV (1976–2003); WYCM (2003–2012)

Technical information
- Licensing authority: FCC
- Facility ID: 4102
- Class: A
- ERP: 250 watts
- HAAT: 178 meters (584 ft)
- Transmitter coordinates: 42°11′29″N 71°58′57.7″W

Links
- Public license information: Public file; LMS
- Webcast: Listen live
- Website: www.theq901.com

WYQQ (90.1 FM; "The Q") is a radio station broadcasting a Christian contemporary hit radio format. Licensed to Charlton, Massachusetts, United States, the station serves Southern Worcester County. The station is owned by Epic Light Network, Inc.

The station signed on in 1976, as WBPV, the high school radio station at Bay Path Regional Vocational Technical High School. It became WYCM when Christian Mix Radio bought the station in 2003, and introduced a contemporary Christian music format. On October 20, 2012, the station changed its call sign to the current WYQQ, when Epic Light purchased the station. WYQQ went on the air as "The Q 90.1 FM" in December.
