= OutStart, Inc. =

American software company

OutStart, lnc.
- Type: Private
- Industry: Software
- Headquarters: Boston, Massachusetts, United States
- Key people: Massood Zarrabian (President and CEO); John Alonso (CTO and co-founder)
- Owner: Kenexa
- Number of employees: 120 (2008)
- Website: outstart.com

OutStart, Inc. is a provider of social business software and learning systems. OutStart’s social business software and learning systems automate the development, maintenance, and delivery of modular and personalized training. According to the company, its social software technologies enable the capture of a historical knowledge base of insights, experiences, ideas and content accessible by anyone, at any time. John Alonso, Michelle Bruce and Scott Edwards founded OutStart in 1999; the company was incorporated in July 1999.

In 2012, Kenexa, a publicly listed business provider, acquired OutStart for an undisclosed amount.

== History ==
Alonso and Edwards met in the mid 1990s while working at Powersoft Corporation, which was acquired by Sybase in 1994. While at Powersoft, and later Sybase’s Education division, Alonso held a number of roles over several years, including as an instructor for the PowerBuilder product; building computer- and video-based training; and, eventually, creating content. Edwards served as both a programmer and consultant alongside Alonso. As a trainer at Sybase, Alonso says he noticed that most customers rarely availed themselves of all the instructor-led training made available by Sybase. Alonso proposed to his managers that they offer training curriculum online, which he called next-generation learning. Company executives liked the idea and gave Alonso the directive to proceed with his plan of developing an internally used Learning content management system (LCMS). According to Alonso, the software was among the first LCMS developed for either “an internal or external audience of learners.” Other LCMS on the market and in use at the time elsewhere included software sold by Generation21 and Peer3, respectively.

In 1998, Sybase hired Michelle Bruce as an instructor for the Southeast U.S. She had a background in education and soon became part of Alonso’s team. Eventually, Alonso left Sybase, followed by Edwards and Bruce.

After leaving Sybase, Alonso, Bruce and Edwards teamed up to found OutStart. Initially, the company’s headquarters was near Orlando, Florida. According to its founders, OutStart’s name sprung from the desire “to help companies outsource their training and in so doing jump-start their programs.”

In February 2012, OutStart was acquired by Kenexa, a human resources and talent management company. Kenexa bought the company for an undisclosed amount to integrate OutStart's SaaS-based social and mobile learning services with its talent management services. Later that year, in April 2012, IBM acquired Kenexa for $1.3 billion.

== Mergers and acquisitions ==
In July 2002, OutStart acquired Concentric Visions Inc., a developer of enterprise-class content management software. In October 2002, OutStart acquired Trainersoft.com Corp, a maker of e-learning tools. In November 2004, OutStart acquired Chicago-based Participate Systems Inc., a maker of social business software. In July 2008, OutStart merged with Eedo Knowledgeware Corporation, a provider of learning and knowledge management software. In June 2009, OutStart merged with Hot Lava Software, a company with applications for reaching mobile cellular subscribers.
