= List of annual events in Boston =

There are a number of events held annually in Boston, Massachusetts, in the USA. They include:

== Events ==
=== January ===
Event	Date	Venue	Neighborhood	Event type	Notes
L Street Brownies swim	New Year's Day	Curley Community Center	South Boston	Open water swimming Polar bear plunge	A quick swim into the icy cold Boston Harbor

=== February ===
Event	Date	Venue	Neighborhood	Event type	Notes
Truck Day	Around February 8	Fenway Park	Kenmore Square	Celebration	Boston Red Sox fans cheer the Red Sox equipment truck as it departs for the Sox spring training grounds in Florida.
Boston Science Fiction Film Festival	Around President's Day	Somerville Theatre	Somerville	Festival	A 10-day film festival showcasing feature and short science fiction films. The festival ends with a 24-hour movie marathon of new and classic films.

=== March ===
Event	Date	Venue	Neighborhood	Event type	Notes
St. Patrick's Day Parade	Sunday closest to Saint Patrick's Day	West/East Broadway, Thomas Park, Telegraph St., Dorchester Street ending before Southampton Street.	South Boston	Festival/Parade	Starting W. Broadway, E. Broadway, Thomas Park, Telegraph St., Dorchester St. ending before Southampton St.

=== April ===
Event	Date	Venue	Neighborhood	Event type	Notes
Boston Marathon	Patriots' Day	Within the city, predominately on Commonwealth Avenue. (Finish at Copley Square.)	Back Bay, Fenway-Kenmore, Allston/Brighton	Marathon	The world's oldest annual marathon, beginning in Hopkinton, Massachusetts, roughly 26 miles west of Boston. The finish line is on Boylston Street, outside the main branch of the Boston Public Library at Copley Square.
Patriot's Day Parade	Patriots' Day	City Hall Plaza, Kings Chapel, Paul Revere Mall, Eliot Square	Downtown Boston	Parade/re-enactment	Flag raising ceremony at City Hall Plaza at 9:00am. The Patriots' Day Parade will march from City Hall Plaza to the Old Granary Burial Grounds. Later ceremonies are re-enactments of the midnight ride of Paul Revere and William Dawes that occurred on April 18, 1775.: Re-enactment of Paul Revere's ride: Old North Church at 10:00AM.; Re-enactment of William Dawes’ ride: Eliot Square, Roxbury at 10:00AM.
Greek Independence Parade	April 26	Boylston St.	Back Bay	Parade	

=== May ===
Event	Date	Venue	Neighborhood	Event type	Notes
Walk for Hunger	First Sunday in May	Boston Common	Downtown Boston	Pledge Walk	It is a 20-mile walk starting and ending at the Boston Common.
Haitian Parade	Third Sunday in May	Mattapan Square, Blue Hill Ave.	Mattapan/Dorchester	Festival/Parade	

=== June ===
Event	Date	Venue	Neighborhood	Event type	Notes
June Day Parade-AHAC Change of Command Ceremonies	First Monday in June	Faneuil Hall/Boston Common	Boston	Parade	
Dorchester Parade	First Sunday in June	Dorchester Ave.	Dorchester	Parade	
Boston Gay Pride Day	Second Saturday in June	Tremont St, to City Hall Plaza	South End/Downtown Boston	Parade	
Bunker Hill Parade	Second Sunday in June	Main St. & Monument	Charlestown	Parade	

=== July ===
Event	Date	Venue	Neighborhood	Event type	Notes
(U.S.) Independence Day Parade	July 4	City Hall Plaza to Old Granary Burial Ground, and Faneuil Hall	Downtown Boston	Parade	
Boston Pops Fireworks Spectacular	July 4	Hatch Shell Esplanade, Charles River Basin	Back Bay/Charles River	Concert/Fireworks show	
Puerto Rican Parade	Last Sunday in July	Egleston Square to Franklin Park	Dorchester	Festival/Parade	
Columbia Threadneedle Investments Boston Triathlon	July 21–22, 2018	DCR's Carson Beach	South Boston	Athletic Competition	

=== August ===
Event	Date	Venue	Neighborhood	Event type	Notes
Boston (Caribbean) Kiddies Carnival	One week prior to the parade (Sunday).	White Stadium	Dorchester	Pageant Competition	
Boston (Caribbean) Carnival	Last Saturday in Aug.	M.L.K. Blvd., Warren St., Blue Hill Ave., Franklin Park	Roxbury/Dorchester	Festival/Parade	
St. Anthony's Feast	Last Weekend in August	Endicott, Thatcher, and North Margin Streets	North End	Festival	

=== September ===
Event	Date	Venue	Neighborhood	Event type	Notes
Boston Freedom Rally (Hempfest)	Third Saturday in Sept.	Boston Common	Downtown Boston	Festival/Public activism	

=== October ===
Event	Date	Venue	Neighborhood	Event type	Notes
Columbus Day Parade	Sunday before Columbus Day	Atlantic Ave, Cross St, & Hanover St, North End (odd years); Bennington St, East Boston (even years)	North End or East Boston	Parade	
Arlington International Film Festival	Mid October.	The Regent Theatre	Arlington	Film Festival	
Head of the Charles Regatta	Third Weekend in October	Charles River	Back Bay, Allston, Brighton	Rowing Race	

=== November ===
Event	Date	Venue	Neighborhood	Event type	Notes
Build Boston	Second and Third week of Nov.	Seaport Hotel and Seaport World Trade Center	South Boston/Waterfront	Trade show for architecture and building.	

=== December ===
Event	Date	Venue	Neighborhood	Event type	Notes
First Night	December 31	Boston Common	Downtown Boston	Festival	

== See also ==
- Culture in Boston
- Massachusetts culture
- Public holidays in the United States
