= WHIC =

Radio station in Rochester, New York

- Rochester, New York; United States
- Frequency: 1460 kHz
- Branding: The Station of the Cross

Programming
- Format: Catholic radio
- Network: The Station of the Cross
- Affiliations: EWTN Radio

Ownership
- Owner: Holy Family Communications

History
- First air date: March 25, 1925
- Former call signs: WHEC (1925–1927); WHEC-WABO (1927-1933); WHEC (1933-1972); WAXC (1972–1978); WWWG (1978–2003)
- Call sign meaning: "Holy and Immaculate Conception"

Technical information
- Licensing authority: FCC
- Class: B
- Power: 3,700 watts day; 5,000 watts night
- Transmitter coordinates: 43°4′59″N 77°38′52″W
- Translators: 92.9 W225AR (Rochester); 99.3 W257ER (Greece)

Links
- Public license information: Public file; LMS
- Webcast: Listen live
- Website: thestationofthecross.com/stations/rochester-ny/

WHIC (1460 AM) is a Catholic radio station broadcasting from Rochester, New York. Referred to as The Station of the Cross, WHIC is owned and operated by Holy Family Communications. The station began broadcasting Catholic programming on July 1, 2003. Broadcasting at 3,700 watts in the daytime and 5,000 watts at night, WHIC's calls represent the Holy and Immaculate Conception, to whom this station is dedicated.

== History ==
WHIC is the second oldest radio station in Rochester, New York. It went on the air in March 25, 1925 as WHEC, owned by the Hickson Electric Company.

In 1927, WHEC was time sharing with the Lake Avenue Baptist Church station, WABO, which had been first licensed on June 9, 1923, and the two stations were consolidated, as WHEC-WABO. It was the city's CBS Radio Network affiliate from the moment the network began operation in 1928, and was acquired by the Gannett Company, publishers of the Democrat and Chronicle, in 1932. On May 15, 1933, after the Federal Radio Commission requested that stations using only one of their assigned call letters drop those that were no longer in regular use, the WABO call sign was eliminated, and the station reverted to just WHEC.

Until 1941 the station used a number of broadcast frequencies, but had settled on 1430 kHz by 1928 operating first with 500, and later with 1,000 watts from a transmitter on Mt. Read Boulevard in the northwest portion of Rochester. Following the North American Regional Broadcasting Agreement (NARBA) in 1941, WHEC was reassigned to 1460 kHz, and after the war boosted power to 5,000 watts from new transmitting facilities south of the city in Brighton, New York. In the 1950s and 1960s WHEC broadcast popular music along with local and CBS news, sharing staff and some news content with sister television station WHEC-TV, which hit the airwaves in 1953. Gannett placed the station up for sale in the summer of 1971, and found a purchaser in Sande Broadcasting Company, a partnership of local investors and broadcast managers.

After the sale was finalized in January 1972, the new owners rebranded the station WAXC ("Waxy"), and changed format to compete with WBBF, then the top station in the market, by playing Top 40 hits. Through much of the decade of the 1970s WAXC was relatively successful both financially and in popularity (as measured by Arbitron ratings). But after seven years of competition, toward the end of which FM stations started to cut into the audiences and revenues of both WAXC and WBBF, the callsign WAXC was retired and the station sold to American General Media, beginning the era of WWWG ("3WG"). At first the station operated with a full-service format featuring adult contemporary music reminiscent of the final years of Gannett ownership, competing directly with clear-channel WHAM. But the station's more limited AM signal proved to be a greater liability at a time when suburbanization was spreading out the market's population geographically beyond the station's reliable nighttime pattern, and FM competition was growing. So the days of secular contemporary-format programming came to an end early in the 1980s.

American General Media repositioned the station as a religious outlet and announced that the callsign WWWG (originally chosen simply as an easily remembered brand name) would stand for "Where We Worship God". While most Rochester commercial stations had broadcast various church and synagogue services and other religious programming at some point in their history, and Pat Robertson's Christian Broadcasting Network had owned a chain of rural FM stations whose signals could be heard in portions of the market, WWWG's policy of religious programming around the clock earned it the distinction of being the city of Rochester's first full-time religious radio station. WWWG offered a mix of evangelical religious programming among other brokered shows.

In the summer of 2003 WWWG was purchased by Buffalo-based Holy Family Communications to become the network's fourth Catholic radio venture. Holy Family created The Station of the Cross as a network name and rebranded 1460 as WHIC. Officially, the calls stand for "Holy and Immaculate Conception". However, it is likely that Holy Family wanted to pay homage to the station's heritage calls, given their similarity. WHIC began carrying Catholic programming 24 hours a day, with much of the content provided by the EWTN Catholic Radio Network.
