= SunSetter Awnings =

American manufacturer of awnings and retractable screens

SunSetter Products L.P.
- Company type: Private
- Industry: Manufacturing
- Founded: 1988
- Headquarters: Middleton, Wisconsin, United States
- Products: Awnings
- Parent: Springs Window Fashions
- Website: www.sunsetter.com

SunSetter Products LP is an American manufacturer of awnings and retractable screens. SunSetter claims to have approximately a third of the United States awning marketshare.

SunSetter mass-produces and tests its products in a facility in McAllen, Texas.

== Products ==
SunSetter's primary product lines are awnings, but the company also manufactures retractable screens, solar shades, flagpoles, and mats. The company currently produces four different types of deck and patio awnings (including motorized and manual awnings); customers choose the color and size. Most of their awnings are designed for attachment directly to a structure; the company also manufactures one type of freestanding awning. SunSetter sells most of its products directly, but also uses various third-party distributors, such as Costco and Wayfair.

== Advertising ==
SunSetter's primary television commercial is well known in the United States, having been in rotation since 2005. Only minor updates have been made to the commercial over the years as it seems to resonate with target audience members.
