= Montachusett-North County =

Region of Massachusetts, United States

Coordinates: 42.55°N 71.89°W

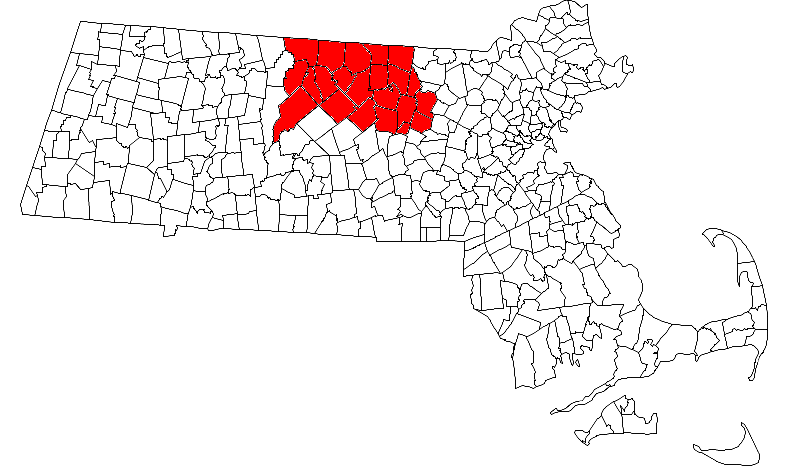
Map of Massachusetts with North County highlighted

The Montachusett Region (also known as North County) is a region comprising several cities and towns in the north-central area of Massachusetts surrounding Fitchburg. As it has no legal standing in state government, definitions of the region vary.

The terms, which are used interchangeably, are usually understood to refer to the area economically tied with the cities of Gardner, Fitchburg and Leominster. The "North County" label—the county referred to is Worcester County—is often used to emphasize the area's distance and separate political identity from the county seat at Worcester.

The region is sometimes defined as including Fitchburg suburbs in the northwestern corner of Middlesex County, Massachusetts. The region's leading daily newspaper, the Sentinel & Enterprise, is published in Fitchburg. Another, the Telegram & Gazette of Worcester, publishes a "North County" daily edition and Montachusett T&G semiweekly insert, both of which cover most of the areas usually considered parts of the North County and Montachusett regions.

Montachusett–North County towns include (towns in Middlesex County marked with *):

- Ashburnham
- Ashby*
- Athol
- Ayer*
- Clinton
- Fitchburg
- Gardner
- Harvard
- Hubbardston
- Lancaster
- Leominster
- Lunenburg
- Petersham
- Phillipston
- Princeton
- Royalston
- Shirley*
- Sterling
- Templeton
- Townsend*
- Westminster
- Winchendon

== See also ==
- South County
- Montachusett Regional Transit Authority
