= South County (Massachusetts) =

Region of Massachusetts

Coordinates: 42.15°N 71.76°W

South County is a region comprising several towns in the south-central area of Massachusetts. As it has no legal standing in state government, definitions of the region vary.

The term "South County" is usually understood to refer to southern Worcester County, Massachusetts, including those towns southwest, south or southeast of the county seat, Worcester.

The region's leading daily newspaper, the Telegram & Gazette of Worcester, defines South County differently, placing the region's eastern border at the Auburn, Oxford and Webster; it places towns in southeastern Worcester County in the Blackstone Valley region. The Telegram West/South edition also includes "South County" news from neighboring towns in Hampden County, Massachusetts and Windham County, Connecticut, however.

South County towns include (towns fitting both definitions in bold):

- **Auburn**
- Blackstone
- **Charlton**
- Douglas
- **Dudley**
- Grafton
- Hopedale
- Milford
- Millbury
- Millville
- Northbridge
- **Oxford**
- **Southbridge**
- **Sturbridge**
- Sutton
- Upton
- Uxbridge
- **Webster**

A broader definition defines "South County" as all parts of the county that are not part of "North County". In this definition, towns that align economically with Fitchburg and Leominster are "North County", while towns closer to Worcester—as well as Worcester itself—are "South County".
