= Middleborough Center, Massachusetts =

- Census-designated place
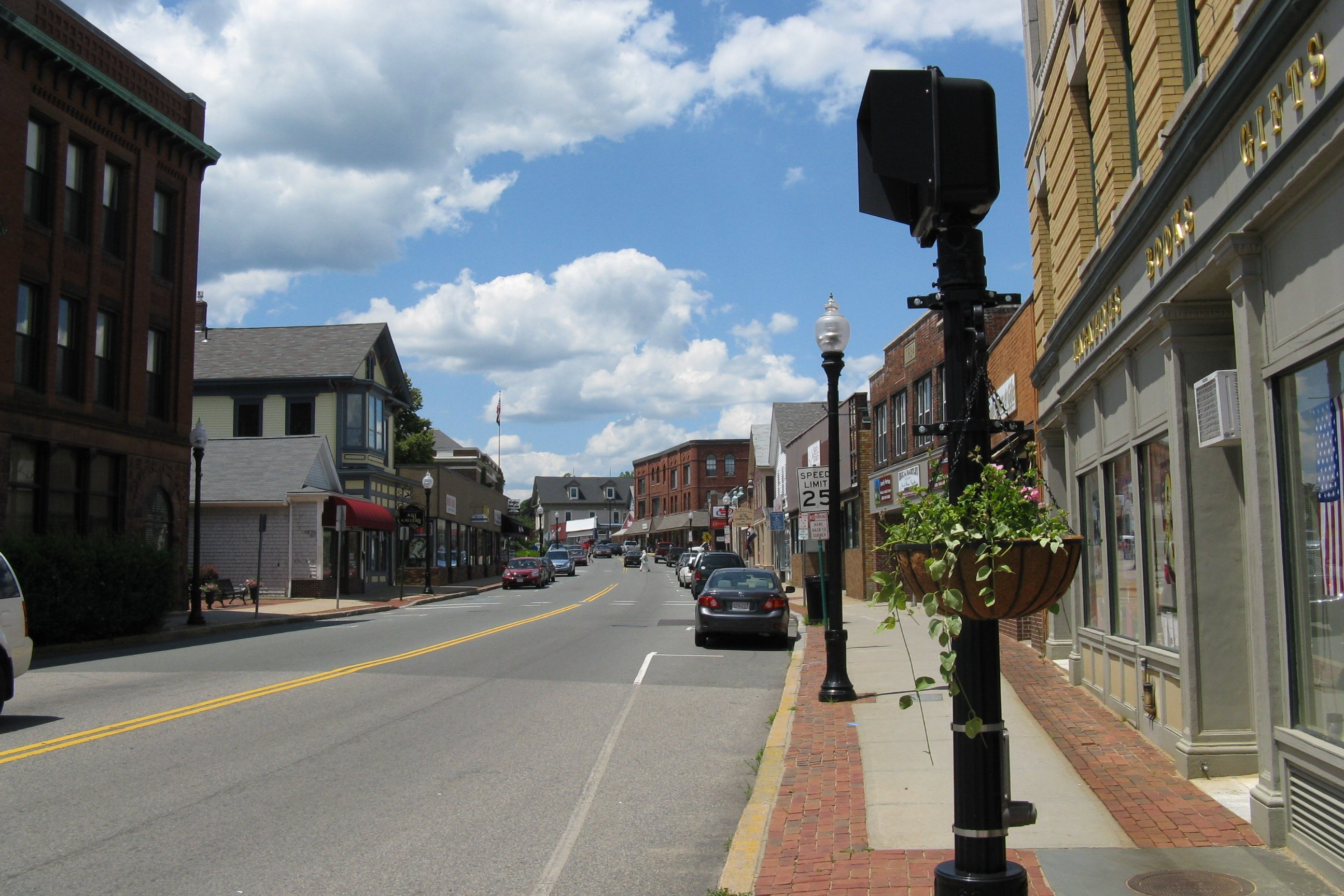
- Centre Street

- Location in Plymouth County in Massachusetts
- Coordinates: 41°53′39″N 70°55′9″W
- Country: United States
- State: Massachusetts
- County: Plymouth

Area
  - Total: 4.03 sq mi (10.43 km^{2})
  - Land: 3.93 sq mi (10.17 km^{2})
  - Water: 0.10 sq mi (0.26 km^{2})

Population (2020)
  - Total: 7,921
  - Density: 2,016.7/sq mi (778.67/km^{2})
- Time zone: UTC-5 (Eastern (EST))
  - Summer (DST): UTC-4 (EDT)
- ZIP Code: 02346 (Middleboro)
- FIPS code: 25-40885

Middleborough Center is a census-designated place (CDP) in the town of Middleborough in Plymouth County, Massachusetts, United States. As of the 2020 census, Middleborough Center had a population of 7,921.

== Geography ==
Middleborough Center is located at 41°53′39″N 70°55′9″W (41.894045, -70.919148).

According to the United States Census Bureau, the CDP has a total area of 10.5 km^{2} (4.1 mi^{2}), all land.

== Demographics ==
Historical population
Census	Pop.	Note	%±
2020	7,921		—
U.S. Decennial Census

=== 2020 census ===
As of the 2020 census, Middleborough Center had a population of 7,921. The median age was 37.0 years. 22.1% of residents were under the age of 18 and 14.7% of residents were 65 years of age or older. For every 100 females there were 93.0 males, and for every 100 females age 18 and over there were 89.7 males age 18 and over.

100.0% of residents lived in urban areas, while 0.0% lived in rural areas.

There were 3,239 households in Middleborough Center, of which 31.2% had children under the age of 18 living in them. Of all households, 34.6% were married-couple households, 20.9% were households with a male householder and no spouse or partner present, and 33.3% were households with a female householder and no spouse or partner present. About 30.6% of all households were made up of individuals and 10.8% had someone living alone who was 65 years of age or older.

There were 3,426 housing units, of which 5.5% were vacant. The homeowner vacancy rate was 1.2% and the rental vacancy rate was 4.2%.

Racial composition as of the 2020 census
Race	Number	Percent
White	6,916	87.3%
Black or African American	225	2.8%
American Indian and Alaska Native	32	0.4%
Asian	116	1.5%
Native Hawaiian and Other Pacific Islander	2	0.0%
Some other race	111	1.4%
Two or more races	519	6.6%
Hispanic or Latino (of any race)	261	3.3%

=== 2000 census ===
At the 2000 census there were 6,913 people in 2,614 households, including 1,649 families, in the CDP. The population density was 657.4/km^{2} (1,700.7/mi^{2}). There were 2,759 housing units at an average density of 262.4/km^{2} (678.8/mi^{2}). The racial makeup of the CDP was 95.01% White, 1.71% African American, 0.30% Native American, 0.64% Asian, 0.03% Pacific Islander, 0.65% from other races, and 1.66% from two or more races. Hispanic or Latino of any race were 1.01%.

Of the 2,614 households 35.5% had children under the age of 18 living with them, 41.9% were married couples living together, 15.8% had a female householder with no husband present, and 36.9% were non-families. 29.3% of households were one person and 11.5% were one person aged 65 or older. The average household size was 2.52 and the average family size was 3.15.

The age distribution was 27.0% under the age of 18, 8.1% from 18 to 24, 33.6% from 25 to 44, 18.0% from 45 to 64, and 13.3% 65 or older. The median age was 34 years. For every 100 females, there were 90.8 males. For every 100 females age 18 and over, there were 87.1 males.

The median household income was $45,906 and the median family income was $52,340. Males had a median income of $38,422 versus $28,194 for females. The per capita income for the CDP was $18,920. About 6.3% of families and 8.6% of the population were below the poverty line, including 11.4% of those under age 18 and 6.8% of those age 65 or over.
