= WQOM =

Catholic radio station in Natick, Massachusetts, United States

- Natick, Massachusetts; United States
- Broadcast area: Boston, Massachusetts
- Frequency: 1060 kHz

Programming
- Format: Catholic religion
- Network: The Station of the Cross
- Affiliations: EWTN Radio

Ownership
- Owner: Holy Family Communications

History
- First air date: November 12, 1972
- Former call signs: WGTR (1972–1982); WSTD (1982–1983); WTTP (1983–1987); WBIV (1987–1995); WBPS (February–April 1995); WBIV (1995–1997); WJLT (1997–1999); WMEX (1999–2001); WBIX (2001–2010)
- Call sign meaning: Queen of Martyrs

Technical information
- Licensing authority: FCC
- Facility ID: 21109
- Class: B
- Power: 50,000 watts (day); 2,500 watts (night)
- Transmitter coordinates: 42°14′50.35″N 71°25′29.22″W

Links
- Public license information: Public file; LMS
- Webcast: Listen live
- Website: www.thestationofthecross.com/stations/boston/

WQOM (1060 AM) is a radio station broadcasting Catholic radio programming in the Boston market. The station is owned by Holy Family Communications and is licensed to Natick, Massachusetts.

== History ==
The station first began operation November 12, 1972, as WGTR, owned by John Garabedian. It was a full service daytime station for Natick and MetroWest, programming top-40 music.

WGTR originally from a small tower in a residential area of Natick. However, Garabedian had long hoped to expand WGTR into Boston itself. In 1980, he won a construction permit to move to a five-tower setup in Ashland, operating at 25,000 watts during the day. This gave it adequate coverage of most of the Boston area. Plans called for WGTR to power down to 2,500 watts at night to protect KYW in Philadelphia and WBZ in Boston; the latter station operated at adjacent 1030 AM. Westinghouse Broadcasting, owner of both KYW and WBZ, complained that the Ashland site would not provide enough protection for those stations. As a result, WGTR was only allowed to operate at 1,700 watts at night.

Meanwhile, as Garabedian turned his focus to FM radio station WGTF on Nantucket and, later, music video station WVJV-TV (channel 66) in nearby Marlborough, WGTR would go through several formats: all-news, adult standards via the Stardust service (as WSTD), and talk (as WTTP).

The station was sold to Satellite Radio Network in 1987, becoming WBIV, a Spanish language religious station. WBIV swapped ownership with the permit for WBMA (890 AM) in Dedham in 1994, eventually moving its programming to the newly-launched WBMA later that year. As WBMA at that time refused to allow WBIV's new owner, Family Radio, to remain at the Ashland site, 1060 would thus leave the air November 3, 1994, following a transitional period in which WBMA operated in the daylight hours and WBIV at night.

Alex Langer bought the WBIV license in 1995, and leased it to Great Commission Broadcasting, who returned it to the air February 6, 1997, as WJLT, a 1,000-watt daytime-only religious station operating from the WKOX towers in Framingham. In 1999, Langer changed the call letters to WMEX, and the station announced a format swap with WRPT (which took on the WJLT call sign), once again adopting a talk format. This took effect on-air January 24, 2000, accompanied by a power boost to 40,000 watts from Framingham.

The station's second logo as WBIX, used from 2003 until 2010.

In 2001, Langer leased the station to asset manager Brad Bleidt, who changed the calls to WBIX and implemented a business talk format. Bleidt bought the station outright in 2003 for $13.8 million and poured most of his efforts into making WBIX a 24-hour operation once again. In 2004, WBIX began nighttime operations from its old site in Ashland, operating at 2,500 watts.

However, soon after a party celebrating the launch of nighttime operations, Bleidt sent a taped confession to the Securities and Exchange Commission admitting that he had turned his asset management firm into a massive Ponzi scheme. He admitted to bilking his clients out of "tens of millions of dollars" since 1984. He also admitted to using part of the stolen money to buy WBIX. The scam would have lasted longer had a Greek Orthodox church not asked for the $1.5 million it had invested with him. Bleidt ultimately pleaded guilty to mail fraud and money laundering and was sentenced to 11 years in prison.

Bleidt had planned to sell the station to real estate investor Chris Egan in 2004. However, after Bleidt's confession and arrest, all of his assets, including WBIX, were placed into receivership. The receiver asked Langer to take over day-to-day operations again. Langer reacquired the station outright in 2006.

Holy Family Communications announced its acquisition of WBIX on July 12, 2010, with plans to implement Catholic radio programming. After the sale's completion on September 15, 2010, WBIX went silent. The call letters were changed to WQOM on September 20; on November 1, it went on air shortly before 8:00 a.m. with inspirational music followed by a Mass conducted by Cardinal Sean O'Malley. He welcomed the new station to the air. (The station briefly tested on September 16, with programming including a recitation of the Rosary and Catholic talk shows.) Holy Family did not acquire the lease of the Framingham transmitter and studios from Alex Langer, who continued to operate WSRO (the former WRPT and WJLT) from that location; as a result, the station began broadcasting full-time from Ashland for the first time in 15 years and increased its daytime power to 50,000 watts.
