= WCCM =

WCCM may refer to:

- Radio stations:
  - WCCM (AM), a radio station (1490 AM) licensed to serve Haverhill, Massachusetts, United States
  - WUBG (AM), a radio station (1570 AM) licensed to serve Methuen, Massachusetts, which held the call sign WCCM from 2017 to 2018
  - WMVX (AM), a radio station (1110 AM) located in Salem, New Hampshire, United States, which held the WCCM call sign from 2007 to 2017
  - WNNW, a radio station (800 AM) located in Lawrence, Massachusetts, which held the WCCM call sign from 1947 to 2002
  - WEEI-FM, a radio station (93.7 FM) located in Lawrence, Massachusetts, which held the WCCM-FM call sign from 1963 to 1974
- Others
  - World Community for Christian Meditation
  - World Congress on Computational Mechanics, a biannual computational mechanics conference
