= WMVX =

WMVX may refer to:

- WMVX (AM), a radio station (1110 AM) located in Salem, New Hampshire, United States
- WUBG (AM), a radio station (1570 AM) located in Methuen, Massachusetts, United States, which held the WMVX call sign from 2012 to 2017
- WHLK, a radio station (106.5 FM) located in Cleveland, Ohio, United States, which held the WMVX call sign from 1997 to 2011
