= WCAP (AM) =

Radio station in Lowell, Massachusetts

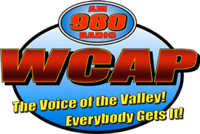
- Lowell, Massachusetts; United States
- Broadcast area: Merrimack Valley
- Frequency: 980 kHz
- Branding: 980 WCAP

Programming
- Format: Full service (talk/oldies)
- Affiliations: WCVB

Ownership
- Owner: Sam Poulten; (Merrimack Valley Radio, LLC)

History
- First air date: June 10, 1951

Technical information
- Licensing authority: FCC
- Facility ID: 49416
- Class: B
- Power: 5,000 watts
- Transmitter coordinates: 42°39′16.33″N 71°21′41.22″W

Links
- Public license information: Public file; LMS
- Webcast: Listen live
- Website: www.980wcap.com

WCAP (980 AM) is a radio station licensed to serve Lowell, Massachusetts, United States. The station is owned by Sam Poulten through the holding company Merrimack Valley Radio, LLC. WCAP's studios are located on Market Street in Lowell.

== History ==
WCAP began commercial broadcasting in 1951 after a five-year licensing odyssey that saw the station's city of license, proposed hours of operation, output power and call sign changed at various points during the proceedings.

Station head Israel "Ike" Cohen established Northeast Radio Inc. in 1946. He sought a license at 1210 kHz in Lawrence and was granted the call sign WABW. However, when the call sign WCAP became available, Cohen took those calls, and later won approval to amend his application to seek 980 kHz, which was ultimately granted a construction permit in the spring of 1949 as part of a regional arrangement under which the Brockton Enterprise won approval to increase the power of its WBET from 250 to 1,000 watts at 990 kHz (the station later moved to 1460 to add nighttime service), and a mutually exclusive application for 980 in Newport, Rhode Island, was denied and dismissed for reasons including lack of candor on the part of that applicant. When the family that owned the Lawrence Daily Eagle and Evening Tribune newspapers appeared poised to win approval for an upgrade of its station, WLAW, to 50 kW on 680 kHz (now occupied by WRKO), Cohen sought and received approval to move the station license from Lawrence to Lowell, which at the time was home to only a 250-watt station, WLLH.

The original investors in WCAP were Cohen and his brothers Theodore and Maurice, each with 20%, Ray Goulding, of Bob and Ray fame, and his brother Philip, an announcer at WMGM in New York City, where Israel Cohen worked as an engineer, each with 5% and engineer Ralph Floyd, 30%. Ray Goulding was station manager and Phillip Goulding served as program director. Ray hosted occasional afternoon programs. Ray Goulding was active in working to get the station on the air, appearing at a meeting of the Lowell Planning Board to advance an argument in favor of a transmitter and studio location that was rejected. The Gouldings were ousted from their positions in a stockholders meeting on September 10, 1951, three months after the station went on the air. Phillip Goulding was quoted by the Lowell Sun newspaper of September 11, 1951, as saying the ousters came as a shock, and the brothers planned to contest it, however they sold their interest in the station to the Cohen brothers. The newspaper reported that the day following the firing of the Gouldings, the daytime-only station signed on two hours late as employees staged a sick-out. Ray, who had been born in Lowell, pulled the first air shift on WCAP, and Ike Cohen kept a signed copy of the program log in his office for the rest of his life. It was Goulding's first on-air appearance on a Lowell station under his real name; he had previously worked at WLLH as Dennis Howard, taking the air name to avoid confusion with Phillip, who was an established news announcer in Boston at the time.

The station was the third to bear the call letters WCAP; the original sign-on for both of the others, in Asbury Park, New Jersey (now WOBM), and in Washington D.C. (now defunct) were voiced by sportscaster Ted Husing. Israel Cohen, at the time a broadcast engineer at WMGM in New York, secured Husing's services for the third WCAP sign-on.

Israel Cohen ran the station until his death in 1994 and was succeeded by his brother Maurice. A deal to sell the station was made in August 2007, approved by the Federal Communications Commission (FCC) on September 25, 2007, and the transaction was consummated on November 21, 2007. The station is now owned by Merrimack Valley Radio, LLC.

In early 2011, the two primary partners in the station, Clark Smidt and Sam Poulten, were involved in a legal dispute over operation of the station, with both claiming that the other partner put WCAP in financial danger. The dispute ended on June 28, when Poulten agreed to purchase Smidt's 55-percent stake in the station, giving him full ownership.

After having operated from studios on Central Street in Lowell since its 1951 sign-on, WCAP moved to a street-level studio on Market Street in 2019.

== Programming ==
During the week, WCAP broadcasts a news/talk radio format including both local talk programs and the nationally syndicated progressive talk show The Thom Hartmann Program. WCAP also airs simulcasts of the morning and evening newscasts from WCVB-TV. Nights and weekends, the station broadcasts an oldies format called "Beatles & Before". WCAP's seasonal programming also includes live broadcasts of high school football matchups, and UMass Lowell River Hawks hockey.

WCAP carried the Lowell Lock Monsters and Lowell Devils hockey teams from the franchise's inception in 1998 until 2009, when the broadcasts moved to Boston-based WWZN. The station added Lowell Spinners baseball to its sports programming in 2003, replacing Lawrence-based WCCM as the team's flagship station. The station nearly lost the rights to the Spinners to WUML in 2005; a dispute between the University of Massachusetts Lowell and WUML's student programmers resulted in WCAP signing a new two-year contract with the team. Spinners broadcasts moved to WLLH in 2007, but returned to WCAP the following season, after the station's sale; it would continue to broadcast games until the team was dropped from Minor League Baseball in 2021.

The station conducts an annual radiothon to benefit the Salvation Army each December.
