= WARV =

WARV may refer to:

- WARV (AM), a radio station (1590 AM) licensed to serve Warwick, Rhode Island, United States
- WARV-FM, a radio station (90.1 FM) licensed to serve Colonial Heights, Virginia, United States
- WKYV, a radio station (100.3 FM) licensed to serve Petersburg, Virginia, which held the call sign WARV-FM from 1999 to 2017
