= WFEX =

WFEX may refer to:

- WDER-FM, a radio station (92.1 FM) in Peterborough, New Hampshire, which held the call sign WFEX from 2000 to 2012
- WBKL (FM), a radio station (92.7 FM) in Clinton, Louisiana, which held the call sign WFEX from 1981 to 1983
