= WILD (AM) =

- Boston, Massachusetts; United States
- Broadcast area: Greater Boston
- Frequency: 1090 kHz
- Branding: Life Changing Radio

Programming
- Format: Christian

Ownership
- Owner: Blount Communications; (Blount Masscom, Inc.)
- Sister stations: WARV; WDER; WVNE

History
- First air date: November 24, 1946
- Former call signs: WBMS (1946–1951); WHEE (1951–1952); WBMS (1952–1957)
- Call sign meaning: "Wild about Boston"

Technical information
- Licensing authority: FCC
- Facility ID: 47413
- Class: D
- Power: 2,600 watts day; 1,750 watts critical hours
- Transmitter coordinates: 42°16′30.36″N 71°2′30.18″W
- Translator: 94.9 W235CS (Dedham)

Links
- Public license information: Public file; LMS
- Webcast: Available on website
- Website: www.lifechangingradio.com/massachusetts-wvne/

WILD (1090 kHz) is an AM radio station licensed to Boston, Massachusetts. The station airs a Christian format, and is owned by Blount Communications, through licensee Blount Masscom, Inc. The station operates during daytime hours only. Its transmitter is located in Medford. WILD also operates translator W235CS (94.9 FM) in Dedham.

== History ==
WILD first went on the air in 1946 as WBMS, with a classical music format. Eventually, the station went to a "popular music" format, briefly adopted the call letters WHEE, then went back to being WBMS. By the end of the 1950s, the call letters were changed to WILD under owner Bartell Broadcasters, who tried a personality DJ and music format.

The station's history is best known for a long-lasting urban contemporary format which began in the late 1950s (after several years in which Italian-language programming and rhythm and blues programs for the black community shared the station's schedule). WILD became the respected voice of Boston's black community for many years.

In 1958, Nelson Noble acquired the license of the station. In September 1966, WILD was sold to Dynamic Broadcasting Corporation owned by Leonard E. Walk. In 1972, the Sheridan Broadcasting Corporation purchased Dynamic Broadcasting. In August 1980, locally based Nash Communications, owned and operated by Kendall Nash, bought WILD. When Nash died in July 1992, his wife, Bernadine, took the helm of the station's operations.

WILD first saw competition when WZOU flipped to a rhythmic contemporary hits format as WJMN ("Jam'n 94.5") in 1993. However, it was not until 1999, when African American-owned Radio One entered the market with WBOT, that WILD saw real competition for Boston's African American population.

=== Local ownership ends ===
In May 2000, Radio One took control of WILD through a local marketing agreement (LMA), which became an outright purchase later that year. After purchasing the station, Radio One slowly evolved WILD from a rather mainstream urban adult contemporary format to a format that focused more on classic soul music. In addition, the syndicated Tom Joyner morning show was added to the lineup, with the former morning host ("Coach" Willie Maye) relegated to giving local updates on the show.

On October 20, 2005, Radio One moved the urban adult contemporary format to the dial position of WBOT. The move replaced "Hot 97.7" for most of the day, but WBOT's mainstream urban playlist remained from 4:00 p.m. until 10:00 p.m. WBOT subsequently picked up the call letters of WILD-FM.

The move cleared the 1090 frequency for a new format, so when WILD signed on at sunrise on October 20, it was reborn as a new urban contemporary gospel formatted station, Praise 1090, based on the success of WPZE in Atlanta and WPPZ-FM in Philadelphia.

The "Praise 1090" format was short-lived. On January 30, 2006, the 1090 frequency changed formats again. WILD became the Boston affiliate for the company's African American-targeted news/talk network, featuring Michael Eric Dyson, Warren Ballentine, Al Sharpton and 2 Live Stews.

=== WILD-FM is sold ===
On August 21, 2006, radio industry website All Access reported that Entercom bought WILD-FM and changed the format (after a "stunt") to rock (a simulcast of WAAF), a move designed to improve WAAF's signal in the Boston and South Shore areas. WILD-FM flipped to the simulcast at 5:30 p.m. on August 22. The sale of WILD-FM meant that the Tom Joyner morning show would return to AM 1090, and WILD would revert to contemporary inspirational and gospel music, ending the news/talk format. The news/talk format subsequently returned that December. In the summer of 2008, the station flipped to a various/brokered format on weekdays and classic soul and gospel on weekends. From December 2008 to May 31, 2011, WILD was the Boston affiliate for Radio One's African American-targeted news/talk network.

=== China Radio International ===
In June 2011, the station became a full-time affiliate of China Radio International. In 2016, Radio One sold WILD to Radio Boston Broadcasting, a company 78-percent owned by Universal Broadcasting Group and 22-percent owned by AIM Broadcasting, for $888,326.16. Radio Boston Broadcasting had been operating the station through an LMA. The station was taken silent on November 4, 2019.

=== Life Changing Radio ===
Effective October 29, 2020, the station was sold to Blount Communications for $80,000, and the station returned to the air, airing a Christian format branded "Life Changing Radio" as part of a simulcast with 760 AM WVNE in Leicester, Massachusetts.

== Translator ==
| Call sign | Frequency | City of license | FID | ERP (W) | Class | Transmitter coordinates | FCC info |
|---|---|---|---|---|---|---|---|
| W235CS | 94.9 FM | Dedham, Massachusetts | 138346 | 40 | D | 42°14′49.4″N 71°2′52.2″W | LMS |

W235CS previously served as the FM translator for WAMG; it was sold to Blount Masscom for $250,000 in 2024 after WAMG acquired another translator.

== See also ==
- 1090 AM
- List of AM radio stations in the United States by call sign (initial letters WG–WM)
