= WUBG =

WUBG may refer to:

- WUBG (AM), a radio station (1570 AM) licensed to serve Methuen, Massachusetts, United States
- WZRL, a radio station (98.3 FM) licensed to serve Plainfield, Indiana, United States, which held the call sign WUBG from 2015 to 2016
