= WVNE =

- Leicester, Massachusetts; United States
- Broadcast area: Worcester, Massachusetts
- Frequency: 760 kHz
- Branding: Life Changing Radio

Programming
- Format: Christian radio
- Affiliations: Salem Radio Network

Ownership
- Owner: Blount Masscom, Inc.
- Sister stations: WARV; WDER; WILD; WSDK

History
- First air date: June 19, 1991

Technical information
- Licensing authority: FCC
- Facility ID: 5890
- Class: D
- Power: 25,000 watts day; 8,600 watts critical hours
- Transmitter coordinates: 42°14′57.33″N 72°4′39.28″W
- Translator: 101.5 W268CQ (Leicester)

Links
- Public license information: Public file; LMS
- Webcast: Listen Live
- Website: lifechangingradio.com/stations/massachusetts-wvne/

WVNE (760 AM) is a radio station broadcasting a Christian radio format. Licensed to Leicester, Massachusetts, United States, the station serves the Worcester area. The station is owned by Blount Masscom, Inc. and features programming from the Salem Radio Network. The station's programming is also heard on translator station W268CQ (101.5 FM).

== History ==
The station was assigned the call letters WVNE on February 2, 1984. The station signed on June 19, 1991.

== Translator ==
Broadcast translator for WVNE
Call sign	Frequency	City of license	FID	ERP (W)	Class	Transmitter coordinates	FCC info
W268CQ	101.5 FM	Leicester, Massachusetts	139775	54	D	42°18′11.3″N 71°53′50.3″W	LMS
