= The Eagle-Tribune =

Daily newspaper in Massachusetts and New Hampshire

- December 18, 2011 cover of the Sunday Eagle-Tribune
- Type: Daily newspaper
- Format: Broadsheet
- Owner(s): Community Newspaper Holdings, Inc.
- Publisher: Jim Falzone
- Editor: Tracey Dee Rauh
- Founded: 1868, as Lawrence Daily Eagle
- Headquarters: 100 Turnpike Street, North Andover, Massachusetts 01845, United States
- Circulation: 35,397 daily 36,904 Sundays (as of 2012)
- ISSN: 1084-4708
- Website: eagletribune.com

The Eagle-Tribune (and Sunday Eagle-Tribune) is a morning daily newspaper covering the Merrimack Valley and Essex County, Massachusetts, and southern New Hampshire. It is the largest-circulation daily newspaper owned by Community Newspaper Holdings Inc., and the lead property in a regional chain of four dailies and several weekly newspapers in Essex County and southern New Hampshire.

Although The Eagle-Tribune is historically tied to Lawrence, Massachusetts, the largest city in its circulation area, it has been based since the 1960s in suburban North Andover, Massachusetts, and has not included "Lawrence" in its nameplate since the late 1980s.

== Awards ==
Despite being a small-town publication, The Eagle-Tribune has run some extremely notable stories publicizing scandals inside and outside politics. During the late 1980s, The Eagle-Tribune ran nearly 200 articles on Michael Dukakis and the Massachusetts prison furlough program, with a special focus on Willie Horton. The series was widely credited for ending furlough for first-degree murderers in Massachusetts, and was awarded a Pulitzer Prize. During the 1990s, The Eagle Tribune ran a series of articles titled Cracking the Ice: Intrigue and Conflict in the World of Big-Time Hockey, interviewing nearly 400 current and former players and officials, uncovering corruption inside the NHL, its players' association, and Hockey Canada, which would lead to the conviction, disbarment, and resignation from the Hockey Hall of Fame of former NHLPA president Alan Eagleson. The newspaper's sports editor, Russ Conway, who led the investigation, was a nominated finalist for the 1992 Pulitzer Prize in Beat Reporting for his work and earned the Elmer Ferguson Memorial Award in 1999. The newspaper’s staff was also a nominated finalist for a Pulitzer Prize for Spot News Reporting in 1996, for coverage of the Malden Mills fire and its impact on the community. The paper won a Pulitzer Prize in 2003 for its coverage of the drowning deaths of four Lawrence boys in the Merrimack River.

In the late 1980s through the 1990s, The Eagle-Tribune was consistently named New England Newspaper of the Year and earned a reputation for quality journalism.

== History ==
Before its 2005 sale to CNHI, The Eagle-Tribune and its predecessors had been owned by the Rogers family for more than 100 years, dating back to the purchase of the Lawrence Daily Eagle (founded as a morning paper in 1868) and Evening Tribune (founded in Lawrence in 1890) by Eagle reporter Alexander H. Rogers in 1898.

Rogers passed the role of publisher to his son, Irving E. Rogers Sr., in 1942; he passed it along to his son, Irving Jr., 40 years later. After his death in 1998, the fourth and last generation of Rogers owners took over, in the person of Irving E. "Chip" Rogers III.

During the first Irving Rogers' tenure, the Lawrence Eagle-Tribune was founded in 1959 by finally merging the company's two newspapers into one afternoon paper. Irving Rogers Sr. was also the publisher who moved the company to new headquarters in North Andover.

During Rogers family ownership, the paper dropped "Lawrence" from its nameplate.

Former Lawrence Mayor John J. Buckley, in 1990, lauded The Eagle-Tribune for helping the city bounce back from the closure of several mills in the 1950s. He said the paper championed economic redevelopment in its editorials and news articles, and persuaded companies such as Avco, Honeywell and Raytheon to open plants in Lawrence.

In 2005, the Rogers family, which had owned The Eagle-Tribune for generations, sold the newspaper and its subsidiaries—including three other Massachusetts dailies and several weeklies—to Community Newspaper Holdings, Inc. of Alabama, for an undisclosed amount of money. Rogers initially stayed on as publisher, but was replaced as publisher later that year.

The paper went through a minor labor dispute in January 2006, after several staff members attempted to start a union. As part of a move to beef up The Eagle-Tribune's presence in New Hampshire, the paper reassigned several staff members to a satellite bureau in Derry, New Hampshire – days after a union vote. Some of the workers said they were being punished for being on a union organizing committee; they said other members of the committee were switched to less desirable night beats. Spokesmen for CNHI said the moves were unrelated to the union vote, which failed.

March 2006 brought the daily paper's conversion from an afternoon to a morning newspaper.

== Subsidiaries ==
As part of The Eagle-Tribune's push into the suburbs—a move which has left some bitterness in the city – the paper has acquired several weekly newspapers within and bordering its coverage area.

Weeklies published within the paper's circulation area by Eagle-Tribune Publishing Company include the Andover Townsman, circulating 6,900 copies per week in Andover; the Haverhill Gazette, 6,400 in Haverhill; and Town Crossings, 14,700 in Boxford and North Andover.

Bordering The Eagle-Tribune's circulation area in southern New Hampshire, the company publishes the Carriage Towne News in Exeter and nine other towns; and the weekly Derry News in Derry and five other towns.

In 2002, the paper made its largest acquisition, scooping up some of its chief daily competitors for US$64 million. The purchase of the Essex County Newspapers chain from Ottaway Community Newspapers, a division of Dow Jones & Company, brought three neighboring afternoon dailies into the fold: the Gloucester Daily Times, The Daily News of Newburyport and The Salem Evening News. Eagle-Tribune executives touted the creation of a regional news organization; they also laid off some 45 staffers at the Essex County papers, including some editors of the Newburyport and Salem papers.

Since then, the four dailies and the weeklies have made several cost-saving consolidations, cutting down to one printing facility and combining advertising staffs. In 2005, the company employed 700 and reached 341,000 readers in 55 communities, according to a spokesman. In September 2008, the company laid off 52 employees in a cost-cutting move.

With its acquisition of the Eagle-Tribune, CNHI also assumed a 49 percent stake in Costa-Eagle Radio Ventures Ltd. and its three radio stations, WCCM, WCEC (formerly WHAV) and WNNW. Continuing its deemphasis of its home town, the company moved WCCM, a long-time Lawrence radio station to a smaller signal in Haverhill and then to its smallest signal in Salem, New Hampshire. The former owners of the Eagle-Tribune created Cambridge Acquisitions, Inc. during the fall of 1994 to hold the minority stake, according to the Secretary of the Commonwealth, Corporations Division. In April 2017, the WCCM call letters were moved to a station in Methuen, with the Salem station becoming WMVX.

== Notable alumni ==
- Russ Conway
