= WWDJ =

Radio station in Boston, Massachusetts

- Boston, Massachusetts; United States
- Broadcast area: Greater Boston
- Frequency: 1150 kHz
- Branding: Relevant Radio

Programming
- Format: Catholic talk
- Network: Relevant Radio

Ownership
- Owner: Relevant Radio, Inc

History
- First air date: August 26, 1935
- Former call signs: WCOP (1935–1977); WACQ (1977–1979); WHUE (1979–1981); WSNY (1981–1982); WHUE (1982–1985); WMEX (1985–1996); WROR (1996); WNFT (1996–1999); WAMG (1999–2003); WBPS (2003); WTTT (2003–2008)
- Former frequencies: 1120 kHz (1935–1941)
- Call sign meaning: Carried over from the former WWDJ (970 AM) in New York City, now WNYM

Technical information
- Licensing authority: FCC
- Facility ID: 25051
- Class: B
- Power: 5,000 watts
- Transmitter coordinates: 42°24′48.34″N 71°12′38.2″W

Links
- Public license information: Public file; LMS
- Webcast: Listen live
- Website: relevantradio.com

WWDJ (1150 AM) is a Catholic radio station licensed to Boston, Massachusetts and serving Greater Boston, owned by Relevant Radio, Inc. WWDJ does not broadcast any local programming, functioning as a repeater for the Relevant Radio network. WWDJ's studios and offices are co-located with the network in Lincolnwood, Illinois, and the station's transmitter is located in Lexington.

== History ==
The station signed on as WCOP on August 26, 1935; owned by the Massachusetts Broadcasting Company, their call letters representing its original studio location at the Copley Plaza Hotel. Originally, WCOP broadcast on 1120 kHz at 500 watts, and was required to go off the air at night. With the enactment of NARBA in 1941, WCOP moved to 1150 kHz and received authorization to broadcast around the clock. In June 1945, it became Boston's affiliate for the ABC Radio Network, which it would keep until the early 1950s. The station adopted a music format in 1956, and became one of the first stations in New England to use disk jockeys. In the late 1950s, one such DJ was Bob Wilson, who later became the radio play-by-play voice of the Boston Bruins.

After stints as top-40 (1956–1962), and middle-of-the-road (1962–1968), WCOP switched to a country music format, and was an affiliate of NBC Radio Network (WCOP became an NBC affiliate in 1966, two years before the switch to country). In 1977, WCOP dropped NBC Radio, and flipped from country to top-40 under the call letters WACQ. The new format lasted only until the station was sold and new owners came in on January 1, 1979. At that time, WACQ and then-sister station WTTK (now WZLX) flipped to a partially simulcast beautiful music station, owing to then-existing Federal Communications Commission (FCC) regulations, as WHUE and WHUE-FM. Stints as an all-news station and a soft adult contemporary format under the call letters of WSNY followed. In 1985, the station became an oldies station under the well-known WMEX callsign, after a sale to Greater Media. Although enjoying some moderate success at first, WODS flipped to an oldies format in late 1987, and WMEX never recovered. In December 1989, the oldies format was replaced by business talk; this gave way in March 1991 to a simulcast of WMJX, and then to leased ethnic programming shortly afterwards.

WMEX briefly held the WROR callsign in a "parking" move until Greater Media could place the calls on the former WKLB-FM 105.7, then became WNFT on October 17, 1996, as the market's KidStar children's radio network affiliate. After the network ceased operations in February 1997, WNFT simulcast WKLB-FM 96.9, then simulcast WAAF after June 2 following a sale to American Radio Systems the month before. During its time simulcasting WAAF, it was noticed one day that WNFT was simulcasting WJMN by accident; a cleaning crew at the transmitter site the night before changed the radio to a more desired station, not realizing they accidentally changed the audio source sent to the station's transmitter.

CBS Radio merged with American Radio Systems in 1998 and was forced to sell WNFT to comply with FCC and Department of Justice regulations; Mega Communications would acquire the station. After a period carrying the syndicated "The Touch" urban adult contemporary service, the station became WAMG with a tropical music format on December 1, 1998, adding a simulcast with WLLH in Lowell and Lawrence the following year. In 2003, the station was sold to Salem Communications, and then swapped call letters with 890 AM (which inherited the "Mega" format and the simulcast on WLLH) and became WBPS, which was retained until the sale went through. Later in the year, the station adopted a conservative talk format and the WTTT call sign. Originally, this primarily consisted of hosts from the Salem Radio Network, but in 2006, Paul Harvey News and Comment and The Sean Hannity Show were added to the schedule.

On January 28, 2008, WTTT discontinued the talk format and began stunting with Spanish contemporary Christian music, switching to a Spanish-language Christian talk and teaching format, branded "Radio Luz", that February 4. WTTT also became the Spanish-language flagship station for the Boston Red Sox Radio Network, replacing sister station WROL. In July 2008, the station swapped call letters with WWDJ (970 AM) in Hackensack-New York City, ahead of that station's relaunch as WNYM.

On November 14, 2019, WWDJ was sold to Immaculate Heart Media, Inc. and the station became an affiliate of Relevant Radio.
