= WKVB (FM) =

Radio station in Westborough, Massachusetts

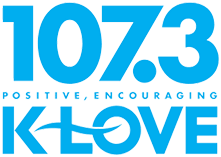
- Westborough, Massachusetts; United States
- Broadcast area: Greater Boston; Worcester, Massachusetts
- Frequency: 107.3 MHz (HD Radio)

Programming
- Format: Contemporary Christian
- Subchannels: HD2: Air1; HD3: K-Love Eras
- Network: K-Love

Ownership
- Owner: Educational Media Foundation
- Sister stations: WCCC; WKMY; WLVO; WNKC

History
- First air date: June 29, 1961
- Former call signs: WAAB-FM (1961–1968); WAAF (1968–2020); WBZU (2020)
- Call sign meaning: "K-Love Boston"

Technical information
- Licensing authority: FCC
- Facility ID: 74467
- Class: B1
- ERP: 2,100 watts
- HAAT: 321 meters (1,053 ft)
- Transmitter coordinates: 42°23′2.7″N 71°29′35.3″W

Links
- Public license information: Public file; LMS
- Webcast: Listen live
- Website: klove.com

WKVB (107.3 MHz) is a non-commercial FM radio station licensed to serve Westborough, Massachusetts, United States, carrying a contemporary Christian format known as "K-Love". Owned by the Educational Media Foundation (EMF), WKVB does not broadcast any local programming but functions as the network affiliate for K-Love in Greater Boston and Worcester. With its transmitter located in Hudson, 20 miles (32 km) west of Boston, its signal is supplemented by WNKC (104.9 FM) in Gloucester, which serves the North Shore and Merrimack Valley, and WLVO (95.5 FM) from Providence, Rhode Island, which covers Southeastern Massachusetts. The station also has boosters in Boston, Lexington, and Waltham. In addition to a standard analog transmission, WKVB broadcasts in HD Radio and is available online.

Historically, this station is perhaps best known as WAAF, which carried a commercial rock music format for nearly 50 years in various forms of the genre, with an active rock orientation between 1989 and 2020. The station also featured personalities including Bob Rivers, Liz Wilde and Greg Hill, and was the first high-profile radio home for Opie and Anthony in the mid-1990s. The station was sold by Entercom to the Educational Media Foundation on February 18, 2020. WAAF's former programming continues on HD Radio subchannels of WBMX and WEEI-FM and on the Audacy platform.

== History ==
=== Early years ===
On October 5, 1960, the Federal Communications Commission (FCC) awarded the Waterman Broadcasting Corporation, owner of WAAB (1440 AM), a construction permit to build a new FM radio station licensed to Worcester on 107.3 MHz, to transmit from Asnebumskit Hill in Paxton. WAAB-FM went on the air on June 29, 1961. In its early years, WAAB-FM simulcast the full service programming of its AM sister station; in 1967, it broke away from the simulcast and launched a stereo beautiful music format.

WAAB-AM-FM was sold to WAAB, Inc., in 1968 for $675,000. WAAB, Inc., was owned by Ahmet Ertegun and his brother Nesuhi Ertegun, as well as record executive Jerry Wexler; all had just recently sold Atlantic Records to Warner Bros.-Seven Arts. The FM station took on a new WAAF call sign on May 28, 1968; the call sign had been dropped the previous year by a station in Chicago. The change from WAAB to WAAF was made to distinguish its identity.

In later years, WAAF ownership would erroneously claim a longer history than that of its own license, stretching back to experimental FM station W1XOJ in the late 1930s. W1XOJ—later given the normal call letters WGTR—was part of the first FM network, put together by the Yankee Network and its principal, John Shepard, who at the time also owned WAAB. While WAAB-FM/WAAF initially utilized the same transmission tower as this previous station, there is no connection. WGTR, in its later years used to provide audio on city buses, shut down on July 14, 1953, and the license for WGTR was deleted at the request of General Teleradio on July 24.

=== Freeform era ===
WAAF ended its automated middle-of-the-road programming on March 16, 1970, and introduced a live progressive rock format, which emphasized folk and folk-rock during the day and harder rock at night. It ran as a freeform station known as "WAAF, The Rock of New England", where the air talent was given total control over what music to play. The station was sold in 1971 to Southern Massachusetts Broadcasters, owned by George Gray, in an $800,000 acquisition.

On November 7, 1971, WAAF was in the middle of an all-Beatles weekend when its transmitting building was damaged by a homemade pipe bomb, knocking it off the air temporarily and causing $4,000 in damage. A group demanding the end of capital punishment and "parole law" in Massachusetts claimed it had orchestrated the bombing. The station was forced to temporarily operate on a limited schedule from the transmitter site, as the blast put its studio-transmitter link out of service. Gray sold his Worcester stations to the Robert L. Williams Broadcasting Company of Massachusetts in 1976 for $1.465 million; he had previously sold his other radio stations in New Bedford and Binghamton, New York, the year before. Robert L. Williams also owned WEZN radio in Bridgeport, Connecticut.

=== Album rocker ===
(Lee) Abrams is sitting down in Atlanta coming up with research that shows new wave isn't the coming thing, it's lost its chance. Not enough airplay, not enough record company support.

— Steve Stockman, then-WAAF program director, November 1980

By the mid-1970s, WAAF had settled in as an album-oriented rock outlet. The station was one of the first clients of the "Superstars" format, developed by consultants Lee Abrams and Kent Burkhart; WAAF would continue to use their services until January 1984. Promotional slogans of the period played off the call letters, including "The WAAF Air Force" and a giraffe mascot known as the "WAAF GirAAF".

WAAF had completed the first of several technical improvements to reach listeners in Boston in 1972 when it increased its effective radiated power to 16,500 watts; it had operated with less than 2,000 ever since signing on. However, it was not until 1978 when the Boston Globe heralded WAAF's entry into the Boston market and its "rock radio battle". In 1977, the station managed to outrate talk outlet WMEX. WAAF's third sale of the decade would come in 1978: the station, its AM counterpart WFTQ, and WEZN were sold to a group of employees, known as Park City Communications, for $3.2 million. Park City sold all of its stations to Katz Broadcasting, a subsidiary of Katz Media Group, for $16 million in November 1981.

WAAF encountered ratings success in the Worcester market to start the 1980s; despite newfound competition from WCOZ (94.5 FM) in Boston, the station attributed its success to extensive marketing, promotion, and contests. WAAF appeared in ratings surveys not only in Worcester and Boston but in Providence and Springfield; WAAF listening was even measured as far away as Peterborough, New Hampshire. Remaining a "Superstars" client, WAAF relied on Abrams' playlist input and received criticism for not taking chances to play other music genres; Abrams notably told WAAF's program director in 1980 that new wave "isn't the coming thing". Music heard on the station tended to lean toward a harder rock focus from artists like Led Zeppelin, Ted Nugent, Van Halen, and Pat Benatar.

As far as we're concerned, it's the biggest promotion ever to hit AOR radio, certainly at least here in New England... we left the competition, WBCN and WCOZ, hemming and hawing.

— Steve Marx, then-WAAF general manager, over the station's 1981 Rolling Stones ticket giveaway

It was during this time, in September 1981, that the Rolling Stones played a warmup show for a group of WAAF listeners at Sir Morgans Cove, a Worcester nightclub. WAAF connected with the band while they rehearsed at Long View Farm in North Brookfield and gave away all 300 tickets for the free show as a reward for locals respecting their privacy; demand exceeded 4,000 in what Radio & Records termed "an unprecedented radio concert promotion coup". All day, station staffers drove around Worcester in unmarked cars handing out tickets to locals who had station stickers or T-shirts. While WAAF refused to announce the name of the location, WBCN obtained the information from a Worcester police officer, causing a large crowd of 4,000 to form outside of the 300-seat venue; 10 people were arrested. WAAF promotion director Steve Stockman blamed WBCN for announcing the venue on-air, declaring his competitor's actions "reckless and irresponsible".

A few months later, Bob and Doug McKenzie (Rick Moranis and Dave Thomas) teamed up with WAAF for a contest to promote their The Great White North comedy album, where the winner received an afternoon trip for two to Tewksbury, while the runner-up won a weekend trip for two to the Lowell suburb. WAAF staffers came up with the contest idea after noticing a sign in Tewksbury that reminded them of toque knit hats referred to in the album. The station had also asked the town's fire chief to give the winner keys to the city; he declined, believing the initial offer to be a prank phone call.

Bob Rivers co-hosted morning drive on WAAF between 1982 and 1987 with Peter "Zip" Zipfel. Titled Bob and Zip, the program became known for parody and novelty songs produced by Rivers; the most memorable one being "Breakin' Up Is Hard on You" ("Breaking Up Is Hard to Do" by Neil Sedaka) regarding the Bell System divestiture, and charted at #70 on the Billboard Hot 100. Rivers also performed "Just a Big Ego" ("Just a Gigolo" by David Lee Roth) which debuted as Roth announced his departure from Van Halen, and was included in The Rhino Brothers Present the World's Worst Records. Rivers and Zipfel attracted attention on the day of the 1984 United States presidential election by instructing their listeners who planned to vote for Ronald Reagan to simultaneously flush their toilets at 7:00 a.m., and listeners voting for Walter Mondale to flush their toilets at 7:30 a.m.; the station then contacted the various regional water authorities and based their exit poll off of the drops in water pressure. Rivers left WAAF to take over as morning-drive host at WIYY in Baltimore; Drew Lane replaced him and was later teamed up with Zipfel.

WAAF attempted another unusual promotion where the station was to have dropped 100,000 one-dollar bills from a helicopter onto downtown Lowell on November 26, 1988, at 1:07 p.m. This event was abruptly canceled at the last minute by Lowell city officials concerned about the safety of people who would have participated, while station management had intended for it to promote Lowell's revitalization.

=== "Untamed Radio" ===
It's important to remember that WAAF has a 20-year heritage as a New England rock station, I don't want any mixed signals from this thing... it's not that dramatic a change.

— John Gorman, on consulting WAAF's 1989 switch to "Rock 40", an antecedent of their future active rock format

On March 10, 1989, NewCity Broadcasting traded WAAF and WFTQ to Zapis Communications in exchange for WEKS-FM in Atlanta in what was a tax-free asset swap; each half of the transaction was valued at $15 million. Zapis Communications was headed by Xenophon Zapis and his son Lee Zapis, who also owned WZAK in Cleveland. NewCity already owned WYAY, and agreed to keep it in the Gainesville, Georgia, market as a condition of the asset swap.

When Zapis took over operations in the summer, John Sutherland took over as general manager, promotions director Ron Valeri was promoted to operations manager, Nance Grimes was promoted to acting program director (Grimes left that October, with Valeri assuming the programming role outright) and John Gorman—a Boston native best known for programming WMMS in Cleveland from 1973 to 1986—was hired as a consultant. As a sign of things to come, Aerosmith was in-studio to play their upcoming album Pump two weeks in advance of the album's release.

Owing in part to Gorman's consultancy, WAAF hired Ruby Cheeks for morning drive that October. Cheeks was formerly a part of WMMS's morning show and had also hosted evenings and afternoons, and had left the station in a contract dispute. WAAF's musical direction was shifted to what was called "Rock 40", featuring harder songs by core artists while increasing the amount of new and current music played. Gorman publicly called it a "fine-tuning" of the playlist instead of a format shift, while the move was also made to improve WAAF's ratings in Boston as opposed to Worcester. With the relaunch, the station was re-branded as "Untamed Radio", a slogan also used on WRQK-FM in Canton, Ohio, another station Gorman oversaw.

Greg Hill, who had joined the station's promotions department in 1986, was promoted to overnights in June, then named as Ruby Cheeks's co-host that November. While John Gorman's consultancy over WAAF eventually ended after he took over as program director for WMJI in Cleveland and subsequently returned to WMMS and WHK (1420 AM) in 1994, Gorman held high praise for Valeri's work as programmer for WAAF, telling Hitmakers magazine, "could you imagine what (Ron) would do with a full Boston Metro signal?"

Starting on January 9, 1991, WAAF's programming was simulcast over WFTQ due to what John Sutherland called "substantial losses" for the AM station's prior format; among the people dismissed was Steve LeVeille. This simulcast ended on September 8 when Zapis Communications entered into an agreement with the Boston Celtics, then the owners of WEEI (590 AM), to simulcast the newly converted sports radio outlet under the WVEI call sign.

=== Alternative and "raunchy" lean ===
I'm into reality and sarcasm, and I call myself a humorist. Some people are shocked, but to me it's rote, I'm just being myself.

— Liz Wilde, WAAF afternoon host

As the station continued to evolve under the "Untamed Radio" brand, Liz Wilde was hired initially for evenings in 1990, then promoted to afternoon drive in early 1992. Following Ruby Cheeks' departure from WAAF to return to Cleveland at WNCX, Greg Hill assumed sole hosting duties for what would be called The Hill-Man Morning Show. Both Wilde and Hill's on-air presentations, in addition to billboards and television commercials suggestively promoting the station, netted attention in the local press for what was deemed as "raunchy" content. General manager Bruce Mittman and program director Ron Valeri defended their content to the Boston Globe as appealing to the 18-34 male demographic, Mittman, in particular, praised Wilde for her creativity. Hill also defended his show by saying, "If something annoys you, turn the knob. Shut it off." Following Wilde's promotion to afternoons, Rebecca Pratt (Note: Until late 2021, Rebecca publicly presented as male and was known as John Osterlind.) took over as evening host.

Much of the station's change to an aggressive presentation came with WAAF's further orientation to the Boston market, having opened a sales office in Newton in 1991. However, WAAF also experienced significant ratings success across New England, ranking number one in Worcester, number four in Springfield, in the top five stations in Manchester and in the top ten in Boston and Providence, all in the 18-34 male demo; management viewed WAAF as speaking to an audience rather than speaking to a geographical location. WAAF also championed local band Extreme upon the release of their album Pornograffitti and single "More Than Words", hosting a softball duel between the band and station staffers at Lampson Field in Billerica.

Every November, starting in 1993, WAAF held a popular annual charity event "Walk and Rock for Change", raising money for food banks in Massachusetts and New Hampshire. During this event, the DJs from the station walked across Massachusetts, asking for change from the people as they stopped in each town and airing interviews along the way. Starting in 2003, during this event, WAAF DJs played requested songs not normally heard on the station for a donation. For the first two weeks of December 1993, Greg Hill engaged in an elaborate stunt dressed up as a "Mystery Santa", handing out $50 bills to random people and even to Boston Mayor Thomas Menino, who declined the money offer. Hill's reveal took place in a news conference after several days of $10,000 giveaways, including several hundred dollars to a homeless shelter, saying he was aiming to capture "the curiosity of the people".

Liz Wilde would leave WAAF for the evening slot on WLUP-FM in Chicago in March 1995. It was her replacements in the afternoon time slot, however, that would garner the station ample amounts of attention and infamy.

=== Opie and Anthony ===
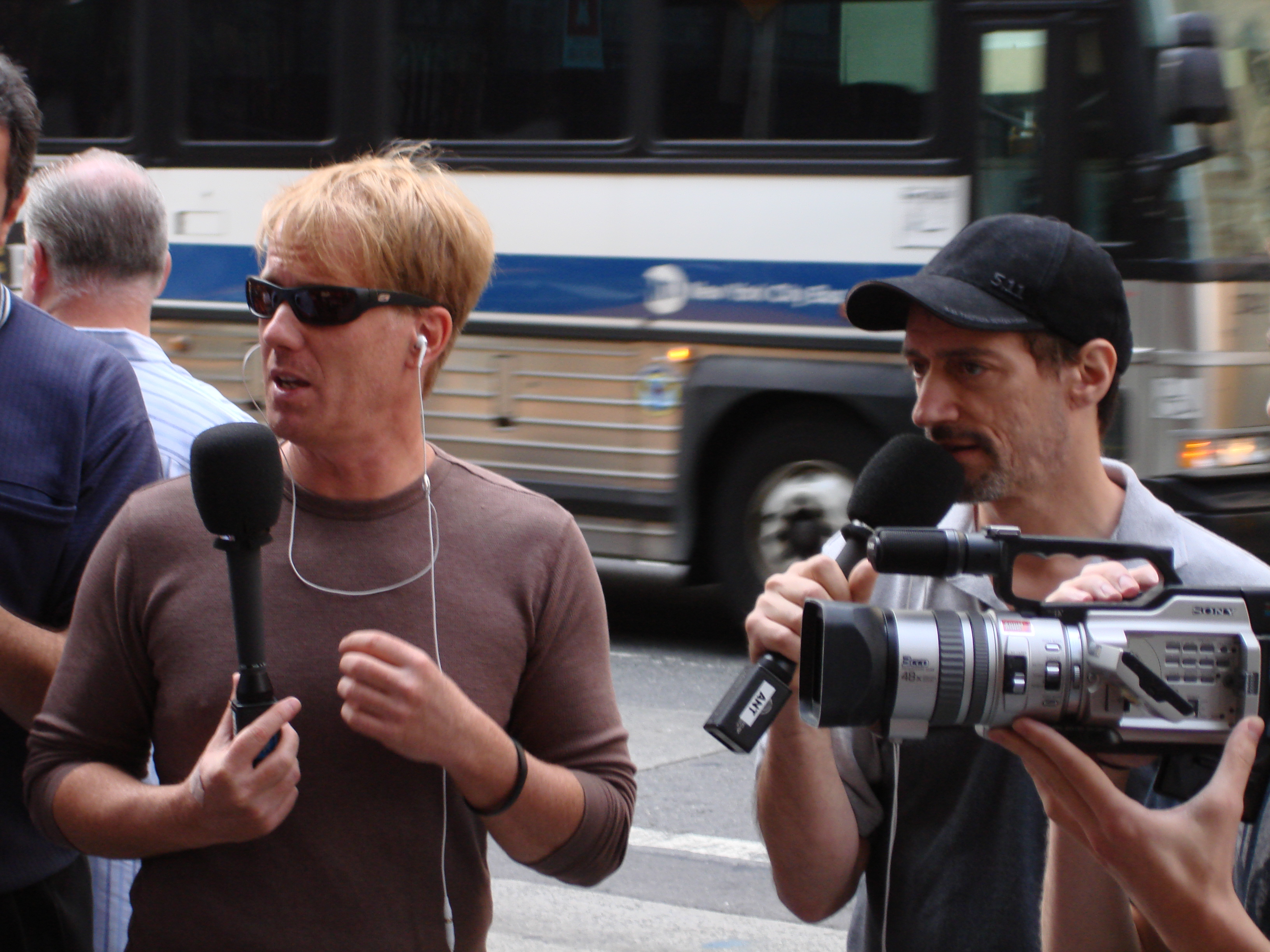
Gregg Hughes and Anthony Cumia hosted afternoon drive on WAAF from March 1995 to April 1998.

In early 1995, Gregg "Opie" Hughes and Anthony Cumia were a newly established duo hosting a late-night program over WBAB in Babylon, New York. WAAF program director Ron Valeri tuned into WBAB while visiting family in Long Island and called Hughes to offer them a job. General manager Bruce Mittman later recounted he "almost drove off the road laughing" from listening to an aircheck assembled by Hughes, and after a competing offer from a Dallas station, Hughes and Cumia were hired by WAAF in afternoon drive in March 1995, officially replacing Liz Wilde. Shortly after the debut of Opie and Anthony, Valeri left the station and was replaced by Dave Douglas; Cumia ignored directives from Douglas and dropped most of the music from their program. Despite this, Douglas cited their show as part of a high-profile airstaff where every daypart could easily be a well-performing morning show on another station.

The duo had several publicity stunts throughout their tenure at WAAF, the most infamous one being "100 Grand" where after weeks of on-air promotions implying otherwise, the winning caller to a contest giveaway won a 100 Grand Bar instead of $100,000. In May 1997, Hughes and Cumia started one of their most notorious promotions: "Whip 'em Out Wednesday", where women engaged in "flashing" to any oncoming drivers that had a "WOW" sticker on their car. The show was suspended for two weeks after a confidential memo from management was read aloud by the duo, while Bruce Mittman canceled the promotion after nine weeks when police contacted station management; Mittman denied the suspension was related. A compilation album of their material from WAAF, Demented World, was released in October 1997.

You can't really feel guilty about it. I don't know, you live by the sword, you die by the sword. I was picked on... because I was 5 foot 2, 91 pounds, in 10th grade, and I never minded it. I always liked the attention, good or bad. I don't care what people think about me. So negative, positive attention, who cares?

— Gregg Hughes, on any possible regrets with his Opie and Anthony routines

Hughes and Cumia further accelerated the rivalry between WAAF and WBCN, especially after Nik Carter replaced Mark Parenteau against their show on WBCN. Carter, who was African-American, was targeted not only by Hughes and Cumia, but by nighttime host "Rocko" for his ethnicity; a rant on Opie and Anthony on November 17, 1997, also contained what were construed as threats of physical violence towards Carter, labeled with the pejorative "Disco Boy" by the duo. Carter responded in kind by calling WAAF "the hate station in Worcester" and "We Are All Fonies", in addition to in-kind pejoratives against Hughes, Cumia and Rocko, both on-air and on the station's website. Hughes responded by telling the Boston Globe, "Eventually it's gonna come down to talent and, not to sound cocky, (Carter's) not in our league... (WBCN is) trying to create talk for their guy, a Howard Stern wannabe with no talent to back what he does."

WAAF would become the subject of unwanted national and international attention in April 1998 after an April Fools' Day prank by Hughes and Cumia claimed that Boston mayor Thomas Menino was killed in a car accident in Florida, accompanied by a Haitian prostitute. This included staged phone-in reports from two people claiming to be a policeman and news reporter, respectively. In reality, Menino was on a flight as the prank unfolded; when notified, he joked about "being back from the dead" but filed a complaint with the FCC over the hoax, saying WAAF "blatantly disregarded the personal and public turmoil they were causing my family and the city" after Hughes and Cumia jokingly offered on-air to allow themselves to be stockaded at Boston City Hall Plaza and pied by Menino. While the FCC took no action, the negative reaction caused American Radio Systems (which had purchased the station, along with its AM counterpart, for $24.8 million on August 1, 1996) to fire the duo and suspend Mittman for one month and Douglas for a week. Mittman later claimed he had no advance knowledge of the prank, having taken the day off to celebrate his 20th wedding anniversary.

Both Hughes and Cumia signed a deal to host afternoons at WNEW-FM in New York City several weeks after the firing. As part of the deal, Hughes and Cumia frequently appeared on Nik Carter's afternoon program through phone-in appearances on co-owned WBCN, which later simulcast their WNEW-FM program beginning in August 2001.

=== The Boston rock radio war ===
Competitors who get locked into one-on-one format battles often wind up resembling each other consciously and subconsciously... it was true in the Cold War, and it's true in the rock wars in Boston.

— Tom Taylor, industry analyst

WAAF's rivalry with WBCN continued to escalate throughout the late 1990s. In February 1997, both stations engaged in a war of words over who had an advance copy of the Aerosmith album Nine Lives first; WAAF offered to play it over the phone to anyone who would call in, while during a listening party for the CD, WBCN announcer Mark Parenteau ripped WAAF as "juvenile" and "trailer park trash bottom feeders". WZLX, co-owned with WBCN, wound up playing the album first over the air and received a cease and desist order. That May, WAAF and WFNX management both accused WBCN and program director Oedipus of directing local bands away from functions hosted by either station. In a Radio & Records op-ed, WAAF program director Dave Douglas saw WBCN's booking of Primus—a band WAAF had played more than any other station in the Boston market—for a festival as insulting, along with a concert performed by Tonic not sponsored by any station but co-opted by WBCN.

During this period, WBCN reported to industry trades as both an active rock and alternative hybrid. WAAF shared as much as 59% of its audience with WBCN in the local ratings, while WBCN shared 32% of its audience with WAAF. The overlap between the two stations became so pronounced that a Boston Globe story in 2000 pointed out directly how much WAAF and WBCN "sounded alike", with nearly identical music playlists and equally provocative air personalities, in what industry analyst Tom Taylor called "the rock wars in Boston". The competitiveness was especially notable as WBCN had several distinct advantages over WAAF: a signal centered in Greater Boston, the local rights to The Howard Stern Show, and the flagship station designation for the New England Patriots Radio Network.

On September 20, 1997, WAAF owner American Radio Systems was purchased by WBCN owner Infinity Broadcasting Corporation's parent company, Westinghouse Electric Corporation, for $1.6 billion. Due to both American Radio and Infinity having multiple station holdings in the Boston market, Entercom purchased WAAF and WWTM, along with WEEI (850 AM), WRKO, and WEGQ, from the combined entity for $140 million on August 14, 1998. After the sale, WAAF moved its studios from Worcester to Boston at a combined facility with the other Entercom acquisitions; the city of license remained Worcester. Prior to the merger and divestiture, WAAF was briefly simulcast on the AM dial again, this time over WNFT (1150 AM) starting in June 1997, replacing a previous simulcast of WKLB (96.9 FM) as a placeholder until ARS could determine a new format for WNFT.

WAAF took credit for being the first radio station to play Godsmack in 1999, giving the band extensive airplay before landing a music deal. In fact, WAAF had booked the band as a warm-up act for a Days of the New concert in December 1997, where they reportedly "stole the show" in a Globe concert review. On June 13, 1999, the station also hosted an impromptu concert headlined by Limp Bizkit on a parking garage rooftop across the street from Fenway Park; the start time was moved up by an hour after WBCN announced the location on-air 15 minutes before WAAF did, and the performance only lasted for 25 minutes before police ordered it to end.

On a WAAF compilation album, an audio track by evening host Mistress Carrie gave out a phone number to someone named "Mike" as an inside joke; the phone number given was the inside studio line to WBCN, forcing the station to change their hotline. Mistress Carrie, who has never publicly disclosed her surname, applied to be a producer for Opie and Anthony right before their dismissal in 1998, but was still hired full-time to the evening shift; her involvement at the station dated back to a college internship seven years earlier. Carrie eventually hosted both afternoon drive and middays.

=== Signal adjustments ===
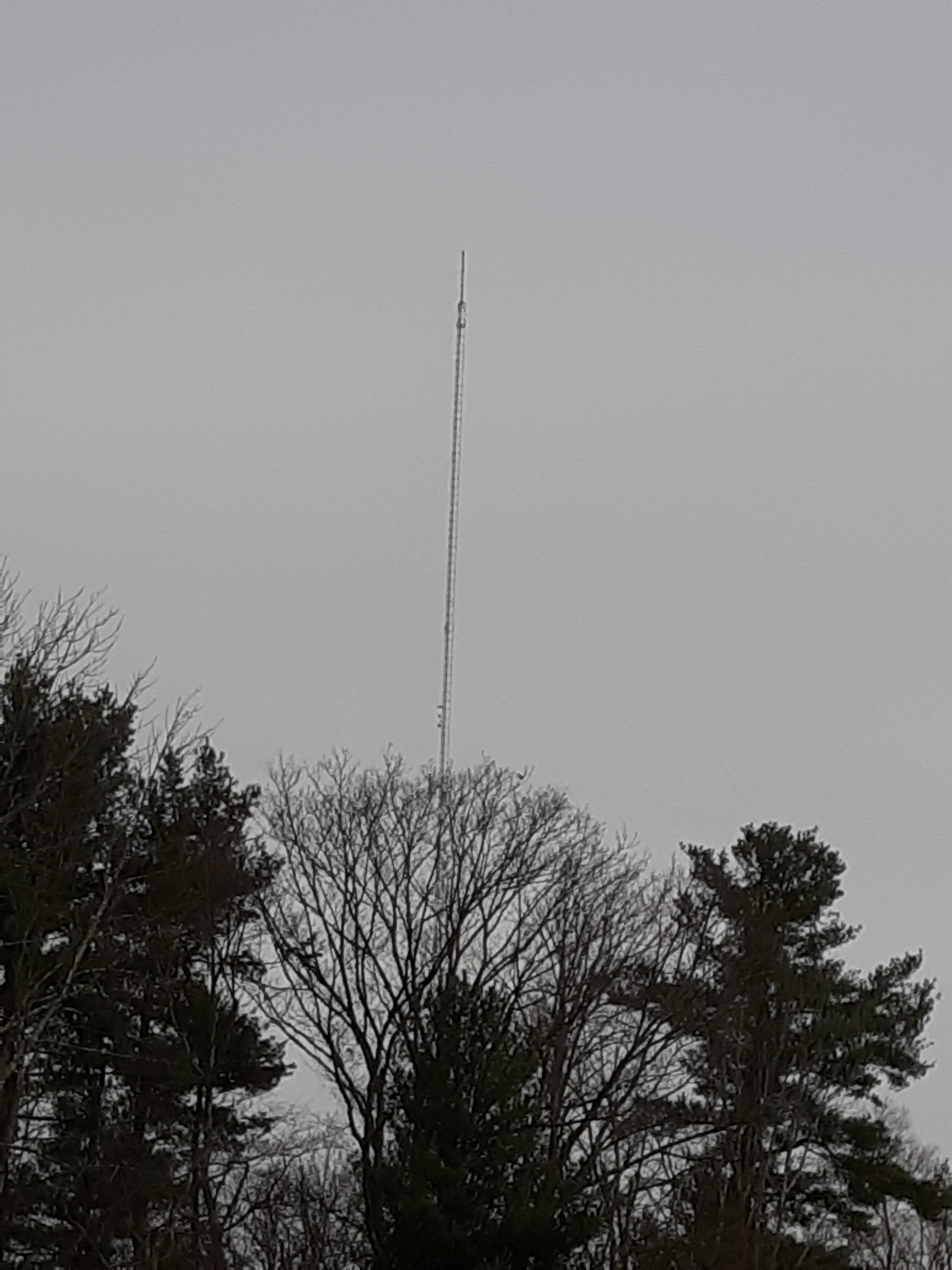
The former WUNI tower in Boylston, home to 107.3 FM's transmitter from 2005 to 2021.

While it had been teased as early as 1999 when their studio was moved to downtown Boston, WAAF was finally able to commence testing at a new transmission site at the WUNI (channel 27) tower on Stiles Hill in Boylston between October 31 and November 22, 2005, on program test authority from the FCC; along with this relocation, WAAF's city of license designation was reassigned from Worcester to Westborough, Massachusetts. While the station's signal strength decreased in most parts of Connecticut and western Massachusetts, the move was an attempt to concentrate the signal into Greater Boston.

WAAF resumed broadcasting at the Paxton site to address alleged multipath issues, which were blamed on a faulty T1 line between the Brighton studios and the transmitter site. These issues were resolved by the spring and summer of 2006, when WAAF resumed operations at the Boylston site. The original program test authority lasted until May 26, 2011, when the FCC officially issued a license for the site.

=== Simulcast with WKAF ===
Radio One announced the sale of Brockton-licensed WILD-FM 97.7 to Entercom for $30 million on August 21, 2006, in what Radio One President Alfred C. Liggins called "a very good start to our asset disposition process". Entercom's purchase came after their purchase of 15 small-market stations from CBS Radio earlier in the day; those stations and WILD-FM totaled $250 million. Entercom entered into a time brokerage agreement several hours after the announcement, and switched WILD-FM to a simulcast of WAAF, enabling full-market coverage of WAAF's programming in Downtown Boston and other parts of the metro area. After stunting with a computerized countdown sequence, the simulcast began at 5:30 p.m. the next day with AC/DC's "For Those About to Rock (We Salute You)". WILD-FM's call sign was changed to WKAF on August 30, 2006. The addition of WKAF was seen by industry analyst Scott Fybush as a way for WAAF to finally achieve signal parity with WBCN; Fybush considered the combination of WAAF's new Boylston signal and WKAF's signal as "the biggest FM coverage of any single Boston facility".

In 2007, the station was nominated for the Radio & Records magazine active rock station of the year in a top 25 market award; other nominees included WIYY in Baltimore, KBPI in Denver, WRIF in Detroit, WMMR in Philadelphia, and KISW in Seattle. WAAF became the longest-running rock radio station in the Boston market on August 12, 2009, after a complicated series of simultaneous format changes by CBS Radio, where WBCN's call sign changed to WBMX and format from rock to hot adult contemporary; WBMX's call sign changed to WBZ-FM and format from hot AC to sports radio as "The Sports Hub"; and WBCN's rock format was moved to the "new" WBZ-FM's second digital subchannel.

WKAF broke away from the WAAF simulcast on January 5, 2017, when Entercom debuted a separate urban adult contemporary format; a press release sent out by Entercom stated that WKAF "delivered little appreciable audience beyond (WAAF's) booming signal". With the switch, WAAF added simulcasts on the second digital subchannel of WKAF and the third digital subchannel of WEEI-FM. One month later, Entercom entered into an agreement to merge with CBS Radio via a Reverse Morris Trust. Entercom, the surviving entity, retained WAAF and divested WKAF (along with several other stations) to iHeartMedia, Inc.

=== Departure of Greg Hill ===
The final Hill-man Morning Show aired on WAAF on July 19, 2019. Greg Hill and co-host Danielle Murr were transferred from WAAF to the morning-drive timeslot on WEEI-FM (and by extension, WVEI, due to it being a full-time affiliate of WEEI-FM's regional network) in the wake of Gerry Callahan's dismissal from WEEI-FM over declining ratings. Callahan's co-host, Mike Mutnansky, was reassigned to weeknights on WEEI-FM, while Hill's other co-host Lyndon Byers and producer Mike Hsu were moved to afternoon drive on WAAF. Byers abruptly quit on air in the middle of a show less than two months later. This left Hsu and Mistress Carrie as the lone remaining on air personalities on the station, along with The Mens Room in evenings, despite a "national search" for Hill's replacement announced by WAAF management when he left.

In November 2019, the station announced a 50th anniversary concert for early April 2020 headlined by Godsmack, a band WAAF had championed 20 years earlier. Intended as part of a year-long celebration, no other events were ever announced or scheduled.

=== Sale to EMF ===
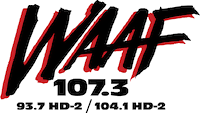
WAAF logo from 2017 to 2020, reflecting its simulcasts on the HD2 channels of WEEI-FM and WWBX

I found out, when Mike (Hsu) found out, after my show on Tuesday. We did our crossover break, and Joe asked us to come into his office. I cracked a smartass joke and said "I didn't do it" and when Joe didn't laugh, I knew something was wrong. Then I turned the corner and saw Mark Hannon—our GM—sitting there, and I got a pit in my stomach. Mark told us straight up what happened.

— Mistress Carrie, on when she learned about the sale of WAAF

On February 18, 2020, Entercom announced that WAAF would be sold to the Educational Media Foundation for $10.75 million. Under a network affiliation agreement signed on February 14, the station would join EMF's K-Love network on February 22. Entercom would still provide two hours of programming for the station on Sunday mornings, so as to satisfy U.S. Federal Communications Commission-mandated public affairs requirements. This agreement ended WAAF's 50-year run as a rock station; Entercom's press release regarding the sale stated that "WAAF"-branded rock programming would continue to air on the second HD Radio channels of WWBX and WEEI-FM (both channels had been simulcasting WAAF), as well as on Entercom's Radio.com platform. Despite the K-Love network affiliation agreement having been officially signed four days earlier, on a Friday, Mistress Carrie and Mike Hsu were not informed of the transaction until two hours before the press release was issued, in between both of their respective airshifts.

The sale effectively marked EMF's entry into the Worcester and Boston markets, which had previously received K-Love programming via a lease of Methuen-licensed WUBG (1570 AM), along with two FM translators in Boston's northern suburbs and reception in the southern end of the market of the network's station in Providence, Rhode Island, WLVO (95.5 FM). EMF vice president of signal development Joe Miller said that Boston was "one of the last major markets we haven't been able to get a major signal into until now".

The final day of WAAF's rock format consisted of a 14-hour farewell program co-hosted by program director Joe Calgaro, Mistress Carrie, and Mike Hsu. Among the in-studio guests was Aerosmith bass player Tom Hamilton, who personally reminisced about the first time he heard Dream On played anywhere on radio while driving in his car, listening to WAAF. Other guests on the program included Bob Rivers, Peter Zipfel, Greg Hill, Gregg "Opie" Hughes, Anthony Cumia, and Rebecca Pratt. Mistress Carrie would later say of the offer by Entercom to do such a long farewell program, "that is a gift that we were given that we will never be able to repay. It's like being awake and attending your own wake and funeral... that you are there to hear all the nice things people would say about you if you were dead, it was overwhelming."

We worked so hard to build the WAAF that everyone told us they wanted us to be. The listeners, we heard you. We got all your criticisms and your suggestions, and trust us when we tell you, we built that station for you, and it's in a computer right now. We were so close.

— Mistress Carrie, on a possible re-launch of WAAF aborted by the sale to EMF

During the final hour, all three hosts stated on-air that internal plans had been in place to "relaunch the station" on March 2. These plans were to have included re-hiring station veteran Mike Brangiforte as the new morning show host, canceling The Mens Room for a local night host, teaming up Hsu with Calgaro, and a revamped music playlist curated by Mistress Carrie. All of these purported plans were immediately aborted once the sale to EMF was announced, with the ensuing "WAAF"-branded rock programming operating without any air personalities. Mistress Carrie and Mike Hsu exhorted listeners to "keep their heads high, shoulders back, and horns up" and declared that "we're goin' out proud, because we were all part of something special" before playing the last song on WAAF prior to joining the K-Love network, "Black Sabbath", from Black Sabbath's self-titled debut album. The selection was intentional, as Mistress Carrie explained, "the album came out weeks before we signed on the air, and Ozzy released a new album (Ordinary Man) the day we signed off, and is the only artist to stay current for all 50 years of our history, and well... SATAN. If EMF was going to take our beloved signal, they were going to have to endure Satan first." Hsu also quipped, "I was hoping they (EMF) had to throw some holy water on the stick when (the clock) turned." Following the switchover, around 150 fans, former employees and staff members celebrated the station's legacy outside of the Brighton studios with an outdoor champagne toast in the parking lot.

Upon the takeover, Entercom "parked" the WAAF call sign on a station in Scranton, Pennsylvania; that station's previous WBZU calls were transferred to WAAF in a temporary move, effective February 26, 2020. (Note: WBZU was only used for the station's top of the hour station identification; despite the similar call sign, there was no connection between WBZU and WBZ, WBZ-FM, or WBZ-TV. Paramount Global, which owns WBZ-TV, holds the trademark for "WBZ" and has licensed the rights to the WBZ call letters under long-term agreements with iHeartMedia and Beasley Broadcast Group following CBS Corporation's divestiture of CBS Radio to Entercom.) The WBZU call letters had themselves been parked in Scranton 15 years earlier when another Entercom-owned station in Madison, Wisconsin, changed formats and call letters. Entercom then changed the station's call sign to WKVB on March 6; EMF had previously used the WKVB call sign on the K-Love station at Port Matilda, Pennsylvania. EMF's purchase of WKVB was completed on April 21, 2020.

Despite the sale, WAAF's planned "Big Gig" concert was still scheduled to be held on April 25, 2020; however, on March 27, Entercom announced that it would be postponed to April 24, 2021, due to the COVID-19 pandemic.

After taking over, EMF applied to move the WKVB transmitter to the WUNI (channel 66) tower in Hudson; (Note: The WUNI call sign had moved from channel 27 to channel 66 in 2017, in a programming and call sign swap with WUTF-TV.) while the move would further reduce the station's coverage of Worcester County, the affected areas could still receive K-Love programming via WCCC (106.9 FM) in Hartford, Connecticut, or WKMY (99.9 FM) in Athol. WKVB also was authorized to construct booster stations in Boston, Lexington, and Waltham—all at locations where two other area stations, WXRV and WXLO, had earlier established boosters. In July 2022, EMF purchased a second Boston-area station, WBOQ (104.9 FM) in Gloucester, to bring K-Love programming to portions of Boston's northeast suburbs not served by WKVB.

== Current programming ==
WKVB does not air local programming; all content is transmitted via satellite by the Educational Media Foundation's K-Love network based out of Rocklin, California. This excludes one hour of public affairs programming produced for the station by EMF on Sunday nights.

== Boosters ==
Call sign	Frequency	City of license	FID	ERP (W)	Class	Transmitter coordinates	FCC info
WKVB-FM1	107.3 FM	Boston, Massachusetts	755567	13	D	42°20′57″N 71°4′29″W	LMS
WKVB-FM2	107.3 FM	Lexington, Massachusetts	755568	630	D	42°24′51.1″N 71°12′37.2″W	LMS
WKVB-FM3	107.3 FM	Waltham, Massachusetts	755569	1,400	D	42°22′42.4″N 71°16′3.1″W	LMS
