= WKMY (FM) =

K-Love radio station in Athol, Massachusetts, United States

- Athol, Massachusetts; United States
- Broadcast area: North County; Pioneer Valley
- Frequency: 99.9 MHz

Programming
- Format: Contemporary Christian
- Affiliations: K-Love

Ownership
- Owner: Educational Media Foundation
- Sister stations: WKVB; WRWX

History
- First air date: December 4, 1989
- Former call signs: WCAT-FM (1989–2002); WAHL (2002–2003); WNYN-FM (2003–2008); WXRG (2008–2013); WFNX (2013–2020)

Technical information
- Licensing authority: FCC
- Facility ID: 51124
- Class: A
- ERP: 1,850 watts
- HAAT: 124 meters (407 ft)
- Transmitter coordinates: 42°35′39.3″N 72°12′0.2″W

Links
- Public license information: Public file; LMS
- Webcast: Listen live
- Website: www.klove.com

WKMY (99.9 FM; "K-Love") is a radio station broadcasting a contemporary Christian music format. Licensed to Athol, Massachusetts, United States, it serves the North County and Pioneer Valley areas. The signal for WKMY can be heard in north central Massachusetts, southern New Hampshire, and southern Vermont. It first began broadcasting in 1989 under the call sign WCAT-FM. The station is owned by the Educational Media Foundation.

== History ==
The station first signed on December 4, 1989, as WCAT-FM, a contemporary hit radio station owned by P&S Broadcasting along with WCAT (700 AM). By 1992, the station had shifted to an adult contemporary format, then to hot adult contemporary a year later.

In 1998, P&S sold WCAT-FM and WCAT to CAT Communications Corporation (a company controlled by Jeff Shapiro), who in turn sold the stations to Citadel Broadcasting in 2000. Citadel operated the WCAT stations as part of its Worcester group of stations, even though Arbitron considered the stations to be within the Boston market. That September, WCAT-FM changed to an oldies format; from 2001 until 2002, this was simulcast on the AM sister station. On April 19, 2002, the call letters were changed to WAHL, after Citadel moved the WCAT-FM call sign to a Cat Country-branded station on 106.7 FM in Hershey, Pennsylvania.

Logo as "99.9 The River", a simulcast of WXRV

Citadel sold WAHL and WCAT to Northeast Broadcasting, controlled by Steve Silberberg, in 2003. That October, the station was renamed WNYN-FM and introduced a classic rock format branded as "99.9 The Eagle". In April 2008, the station became WXRG, a simulcast of adult album alternative sister station WXRV in Andover; in late 2011, the simulcast was extended to the AM station, by then WTUB. The call letters were changed to WFNX on May 6, 2013. The WFNX call letters were previously used by an alternative rock station in Boston owned by the Boston Phoenix, first on 101.7 FM and later as an Internet radio station; after that station shut down along with the Phoenix, Northeast Broadcasting acquired the call sign for 99.9 FM in April 2013.

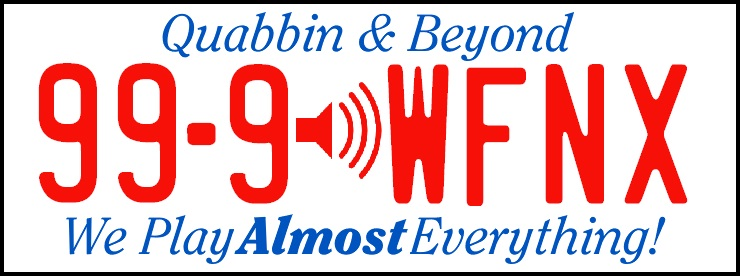
WFNX logo from July 1, 2014, through May 29, 2016.

WFNX and what had become WWBZ dropped the WXRV simulcast in May 2014 and began stunting with a wide range of music while preparing to launch new formats for the stations on June 9, with listeners being asked to vote on which of the songs being played should be included in the new formats. On June 9 at 9 a.m., the station launched its permanent variety hits format, asking listeners to now vote for its nickname; the simulcast on WWBZ ended two hours earlier, when that station introduced a separate oldies format. On July 1, WFNX officially began branding as simply "99-9 WFNX". In May 2016, the station announced that it would end its variety hits format after May 29 and return to simulcasting WXRV, citing a lack of advertiser support; in its announcement, WFNX said it needed ten businesses to advertise on the station on an annual basis to cover its costs.

Northeast Broadcasting agreed to sell WFNX to the Educational Media Foundation (EMF) for $250,000 in January 2020; EMF already owned WKMY (91.1 FM) in nearby Winchendon, which carried its K-Love network. The sale was one of two EMF acquisitions in Worcester County in early 2020; it announced its purchase of WAAF a month later. The WFNX sale was completed on May 4, 2020; on May 19, it took on the WKMY call sign, reflecting the move of K-Love's contemporary Christian programming from 91.1, which became Air1 station WRWX.
