= WORC (AM) =

Tropical music radio station in Worcester, Massachusetts

- Worcester, Massachusetts; United States
- Broadcast area: Central Massachusetts
- Frequency: 1310 kHz
- Branding: La Mega 106.1

Programming
- Language: Spanish
- Format: Tropical music

Ownership
- Owner: Gois Broadcasting LLC
- Sister stations: WNEZ; WAMG; WLLH

History
- First air date: February 14, 1925
- Former call signs: WKBE (1925–1929); WORC (1929–1930); WORC-WEPS (1930–1933)
- Former frequencies: 1310 kHz (1925–1928); 1200 kHz (1928–1933); 1280 kHz (1933–1941)
- Call sign meaning: Worcester

Technical information
- Licensing authority: FCC
- Facility ID: 15858
- Class: B
- Power: 5,000 watts (day); 1,000 watts (night)
- Transmitter coordinates: 42°13′19.34″N 71°49′0.26″W
- Translator: 106.1 W291DB (Worcester)

Links
- Public license information: Public file; LMS
- Webcast: Listen live

WORC (1310 kHz, "La Mega 106.1") is a commercial AM radio station in Worcester, Massachusetts, United States, owned by Gois Broadcasting. The station broadcasts at a transmitter power output of 5,000 watts during the day and 1,000 watts at night, and serves central and eastern Massachusetts. Since January 2005, the station has been broadcasting full-time in Spanish with a tropical music format. The station is the only full-time Spanish-language station serving central Massachusetts, especially Worcester's rapidly increasing Latino population. WORC's programming is also heard on translator station W291DB (106.1 FM).

== History ==
WORC was first licensed, as WKBE on 1300 kHz, to the K & B Electric Company in Webster, Massachusetts, in February 1925. The station's call sign was changed to WORC in 1929.

In 1930, a second station, WEPS, was consolidated with WORC, and the station was now assigned the dual call sign of WORC-WEPS. (Note: WEPS had been initially licensed in 1926 to Ralph G. Matheson at 282 Washington Street in Gloucester, Massachusetts.) On May 15, 1933, after the Federal Radio Commission requested that stations using only one of their assigned call letters drop those that were no longer in regular use, the WEPS call sign was eliminated, and the station reverted to just WORC.

A one-time affiliate of both the CBS and ABC radio networks, WORC from 1955 until 1984, had a Top 40 format. In late 1984, the station began programming country music. When the station was purchased by The Davis Advertising Company of Worcester in 1989, the format became oldies, as management attempted to re-create the excitement of WORC's early rock and roll years. By August 1994, the oldies format was gradually being phased out in favor of a talk radio format. Davis eventually sold WORC to the present owners who instituted the current format.

== Translator ==
Broadcast translator for WORC
| Call sign | Frequency | City of license | FID | ERP (W) | Class | Transmitter coordinates | FCC info |
|---|---|---|---|---|---|---|---|
| W291DB | 106.1 FM | Worcester, Massachusetts | 138941 | 145 | D | 42°13′28″N 71°52′49″W | LMS |
