= WCCM (AM) =

Radio station in Haverhill, Massachusetts

- Haverhill, Massachusetts; United States
- Broadcast area: Merrimack Valley
- Frequency: 1490 kHz
- Branding: Que Onnda 103.7

Programming
- Format: Spanish CHR
- Affiliations: Boston Red Sox Spanish Radio Network

Ownership
- Owner: Jose Villafañe; (Costa Media Boston LLC)
- Sister stations: WUBG

History
- First air date: March 16, 1947
- Former call signs: WHAV (1947–2002); WCCM (2002–2007); WCEC (2007–2018)
- Call sign meaning: originally used on WCCM (800 AM), now WNNW; attempt at a Roman numeral for 800 (subtract CC (200) from M (1000) to get 800)

Technical information
- Licensing authority: FCC
- Facility ID: 49382
- Class: C
- Power: 1,000 watts unlimited
- Transmitter coordinates: 42°46′22.33″N 71°5′59.21″W
- Translator: 103.7 W279DH (Haverhill)

Links
- Public license information: Public file; LMS
- Website: queonnda.com/boston/

WCCM (1490 kHz) is an AM radio station broadcasting a Spanish CHR format. Licensed to Haverhill, Massachusetts, United States, the station is owned by Jose Villafañe's Costa Media Boston LLC. WCCM also operates a translator station, W279DH (103.7 FM) in Haverhill.

The station went on the air in 1947 as WHAV, the radio station of The Haverhill Gazette, which owned it until 1954. WHAV continued to operate as a local station for Haverhill through several ownership changes until Costa Communications, forerunner of Costa-Eagle Radio Ventures, bought it in 1995 and relaunched the station as Spanish-language "Radio Impacto". Rearrangements of the Costa-Eagle stations' programming saw WHAV become talk station WCCM in 2002; it returned to "Impacto" as WCEC in 2007, and retook the WCCM call sign in 2018. Costa Media Boston—a separate company from Costa-Eagle Radio Ventures—began programming WCCM in 2021 as Spanish CHR station "LatinX 103.7", later rebranded "Exitos Boston", and acquired the station in 2024.

== History ==
=== The original WHAV ===
Plans for the station that would become WCCM began during World War II in the offices of The Haverhill Gazette, a daily newspaper serving what was, in the middle of the century, a shoe-manufacturing center 30 miles (48 km) north of Boston. The Gazette, as early as 1944, planned an FM radio station, but had to wait for the end of wartime controls on new construction. John T. Russ announced on April 14, 1945, in the newspaper that "The Gazette long ago recognized the need of a Haverhill radio station and has long been in agreement with your premise that a newspaper is the logical proprietor of a broadcasting service, especially because the dissemination of news is the primary task of both press and radio." He defined WHAV's mission during the inaugural March 16, 1947, broadcast:

WHAV is going to be your station — a station for the people of Haverhill and the people in our surrounding towns. What concerns you directly, your lives and businesses, your community betterment will always get first priority on the WHAV airwaves.

=== Early obstacles ===
In its application to the Federal Communications Commission (FCC), The Gazette sought authority to construct a 300-foot (91 m) tower on Ayer's Hill, the highest point of land in Haverhill. The station would transmit at a frequency of 46.5 MHz (a frequency then assigned to FM) and use a 1,000-watt Western Electric (AT&T) transmitter. At that time, Western Electric operated a manufacturing facility in the city. Russ predicted the station would cost $30,000 to $50,000, operate eight hours per day at the start and employ 11 people. One of the first delays in moving the station forward was a debate over the location of the tower. The Gazette indicated its selection of Ayer's Hill was second to Silver Hill, a more centrally located city-owned parcel. Mayor Glynn and some alderman were willing to sell or lease the Silver Hill site, but others held out for using the site as a war memorial. (Note: The war memorial was not constructed for another 40 years and was placed at another location.) J.R. Poppele, chief engineer of WOR in New York, conducted the original survey of sites. The Gazette ultimately bought the Silver Hill site at auction and the FCC conditionally granted the license December 10, 1945.

A major blow to the FM project came, however, when the FCC moved FM's spectrum assignment from the 42–50 MHz band, allocated just before the war, to the 88–106 (later expanded to 108) MHz band. This had the effect of rendering 500,000 receivers obsolete. The Gazette responded by filing an application for a 250-watt AM station. "Mr. Russ said establishment of an AM station for local coverage does not mean the company has abandoned plans for its FM station. It was decided to apply for an AM station when it became apparent facilities were not going to be developed as fast as first believed possible for FM stations. The company plans to operate the AM station in conjunction with (what would now be a 20,000-watt) FM station when the later station is set up."

=== Construction begins ===
The following month it was announced that impressive art deco studios would be constructed in downtown Haverhill, while a transmitting building would be built on Silver Hill. The first 160 feet (49 m) of the tower would be for AM transmissions at 1490 kHz, while an isolated 80-foot (24 m) mast on the top would be erected for later FM transmission at 96.1 MHz. James B. Dunbar, commercial manager of the station, said The Gazette reached agreement with the City of Haverhill to swap its approved call letters of WHGF with the police department's radio station, WHAV. Al Taylor, recruited from WCAU in Philadelphia, and a former newspaperman who had interviewed Adolf Hitler, would become the first program director, and Herbert W. Brown became chief engineer.

With transmission facilities completed, the inaugural broadcast of the AM station was set to take place March 16, 1947, from temporary studios downtown. Programs that day included a drama, "One Way Ticket", starring Fred Waring and Myrna Loy. The new studios, being designed by local architect Clinton F. Goodwin, would be ready later that year. In an interview during the early 1980s, Goodwin admitted he toured other stations, including WEEI (590 AM) in Boston to determine how best to design the studios. That may explain why the station's facilities convey a 1930s' appearance. The new one-story studio building contained two large studios – one containing the requisite piano – and a small announcer's booth. There was also a large lobby with a double-paned window looking into the largest studio. Offices, just off the lobby, included a newsroom with a built-in bin to capture teletype paper. The basement contained record storage areas, an announcers' lounge and the chief engineer's office and work area.

=== WHAV-FM signs on ===
WHAV-FM finally went on the air April 14, 1948. WHAV-FM, as was the custom of the day, simply simulcasted the AM programs. Despite its earlier frequency announcement, the FM station was licensed on 92.5 MHz. "FM broadcasting opens a new era for radio in Haverhill. It will give WHAV a second voice and will reach out into homes within a 50-mile radius of the city", The Gazette announced.

=== AM & FM simulcast ===
WHAV AM and FM joined the Continental Network, whose key station was WASH-FM in Washington, D.C., in time for President Harry S. Truman's inauguration. The stations were the second in Massachusetts to become associated with Continental and the eighth in New England. Vaughn Monroe made an appearance on the stations during the grand opening of the new studio building to promote what would be a big band format, said Jackie Natalino, former music librarian, during a 1978 interview. On September 29, 1950, WHAV announced it would join "the Liberty Broadcasting System – third largest network in America". Liberty Broadcasting System began in 1948 with 42 affiliates and offered a sports format. It was operated by Gordon McLendon, out of KLIF in Dallas, Texas. McLendon and Ted Husing handled all football broadcasts for the network. McLendon, who pioneered radio's transition into the television age, also hosted a show, "Great Days In Sports", which recreated great sports events from the past. WHAV joined Liberty just as the nationwide network grew to 240 affiliates with 10 hours of programs a day. At its peak, Liberty had 458 affiliates, but folded in 1952. It was a difficult time for radio, and WHAV-FM was not exempt.

=== Trouble begins ===
One major obstacle was The Gazette's mistaken idea that FM-receiving sets would be readily available after the war, according to Mrs. Natalino. To work around the problem, WHAV worked with local bus lines to have FM music piped into buses. However, she said, the FCC banned the action when bus riders complained of being "a captive audience". The FCC also placed restrictions on simulcasting, requiring more of FM programs to be original and adding substantially to programming costs. As debts mounted, former News Director Edwin V. Johnson recalled, most of the staff was released. That left Johnson and an engineer playing all taped programs from the newly introduced Presto-brand commercial reel-to-reel tape recorders. Johnson, who joined the station in June 1951, changed his status to part-time, but remained until his retirement in 1985. WHAV-FM was dark by 1953 and its transmitter ended up 30 or so miles away at WCRB.

The virtually insolvent WHAV was sold in 1954 to Edward I. Cetlin and Henry R. and Morris Silver. The Silver brothers were owners of a successful bottling company in Manchester, New Hampshire, and former owners of two New Hampshire radio stations: WFEA in Manchester and WKXL in Concord. Free for the asking, WHAV's new owners would revive 20,000-watt WHAV-FM on 92.5 MHz in 1959. Stereo did not come until the 1970s for WHAV-FM when it aired an automated "beautiful music" format. A power increase to an effective radiated power output of 50,000 watts was partly financed by WPRO-FM, a Rhode Island station on an adjacent frequency (92.3 MHz) as a condition of its own power increase, as former chief engineer Ted Nahil once remarked.

Tom Bergeron, who would go on to host Hollywood Squares, America's Funniest Home Videos, and Dancing With The Stars, got his start on WHAV in the mid-1970s.

=== Later sales and switch to Spanish ===
In July 1979, the license renewals for WHAV and WHAV-FM were designated for hearing by the FCC as part of an investigation (initiated by copywriter Madolyn Roberts) into equal employment opportunity issues, as well as misrepresentations in prior renewal applications. The following year, under the FCC's distress sale policy, Cetlin and the Silvers sold the WHAV stations to an Asian American-controlled company, Northeast Broadcasting Company, for $1.1 million; the sale was completed in 1981. The FM station went on to become WLYT and later WXRV. (Note: Northeast continues to own WXRV as Beanpot Broadcasting Corp., a Delaware corporation with principal offices in Bedford, New Hampshire.) By August 1993, WHAV shifted its music format from adult contemporary to oldies, while retaining its talk programming.

WHAV was turned over to Eastern Media of Methuen, Massachusetts, in March 1995; this made it a sister station to WNNW (1110 AM) in Salem, New Hampshire. WHAV would air Spanish-language programs and dub itself "Radio Impacto"; the subsequent sale of the station from Northeast Broadcasting to Costa Communications would be challenged by Haverhill city officials, claiming that, as the only WHAV staffer to speak Spanish worked on Sundays, its programming was not being monitored. The Costa Communications stations were transferred to Costa-Eagle Radio Ventures Ltd. when the owners of the Eagle-Tribune bought a 49 percent stake in the company and returned to broadcasting (the newspaper previously owned WLAW and WLAW-FM). The Eagle-Tribune partnered with the stations' principal owner, Pat Costa, with the intention of creating a network of Spanish-language radio stations. Costa-Eagle would go on to purchase WCCM (800 AM) from Curt Gowdy Broadcasting Corp. in 1998; later that year, the owners of the Eagle-Tribune formed ETP Ventures Inc. and purchased the Haverhill Gazette. Ownership of WHAV and the Haverhill Gazette had come full circle.

In September 2002, Costa-Eagle rearranged the programming of its three stations: WHAV's "Impacto" programming moved to 1110 AM as WCEC, the tropical music programming of WNNW (1110 AM) moved to 800 AM, and the talk and sports programing of WCCM (800 AM) replaced WHAV on 1490 AM. WHAV formally changed its call sign to WCCM on September 23, 2002. In 2004, the sports programming was replaced with oldies; in May 2005, while continuing with English-language programming in the daytime, an overnight block of Spanish-language programming was added to WCCM's lineup as a response to the sale of WAMG, Costa-Eagle's primary competitor for Spanish-language programming in Greater Boston, to a sports talk operator.

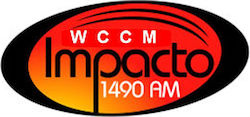
Late 2010s logo as "Impacto 1490"

On July 30, 2007, the station changed its call sign to WCEC, ahead of an August 1 programming swap that saw WCCM's English-language talk programming move to 1110 AM, and the return of WCEC's Spanish-language "Impacto" talk programming to 1490. The WCCM call sign returned to 1490 on April 3, 2018.

The station has aired Spanish-language broadcasts of Major League Baseball's Boston Red Sox from 2014 to 2019 and since 2022, with Uri Berenguer as the play-by-play announcer.

On August 4, 2021, the "Impacto" Spanish news/talk programming moved back to WMVX (1110 AM); WCCM then entered into a local marketing agreement with Jose Villafañe's Costa Media Boston LLC, and relaunched as a Spanish CHR station branded as "LatinX 103.7". (Note: Despite the local marketing agreement and their similar names, Costa Media Boston and Costa-Eagle Radio Ventures are separate and unrelated companies.) Villafañe, a former executive for Entravision, Univision, and Radio Unica, saw WCCM as the first station in a planned network of Spanish-language stations in the Northeastern United States; by 2022, Costa Media Boston had expanded "LatinX" to sister station WUBG (1570 AM), began operating two stations in Washington, D.C., and obtained an option to acquire WCCM and the other Costa-Eagle stations. In January 2024, WCCM and WUBG rebranded to "Exitos Boston", with no change in format. In August 2024, Costa Media Boston agreed to acquire WCCM and translator W279DH outright for $1.25 million.

== Translators ==
Broadcast translator for WCCM
Call sign	Frequency	City of license	FID	ERP (W)	Class	Transmitter coordinates	FCC info
W279DH	103.7 FM	Haverhill, Massachusetts	26359	100	D	42°46′23.3″N 71°5′59.2″W	LMS
