= WHAV-LP =

Radio station in Haverhill, Massachusetts

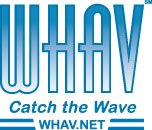
- Haverhill, Massachusetts; United States
- Broadcast area: Merrimack Valley
- Frequency: 97.9 MHz
- Branding: 97.9 WHAV

Programming
- Format: full-service radio; oldies
- Affiliations: Associated Press; Pacifica Radio

Ownership
- Owner: Public Media of New England, Inc.

History
- First air date: September 2016
- Call sign meaning: Haverhill

Technical information
- Licensing authority: FCC
- Facility ID: 193811
- Class: Low-power FM
- ERP: 4 watts
- HAAT: 151.934 meters (498.47 ft)
- Transmitter coordinates: 42°46′23.33″N 71°5′59.2″W

Links
- Public license information: LMS
- Webcast: Listen live
- Website: whav.net

WHAV-LP (97.9 FM) – branded 97.9 WHAV – is a non-commercial low-power radio station licensed to serve Haverhill, Massachusetts, and owned by Public Media of New England, Inc. WHAV-LP services the immediate Merrimack Valley, it considers itself the successor station to the original WHAV (1490 AM now WCCM) also licensed to Haverhill, and transmits from WHAV's original 1947 transmitter site. In addition to its standard analog transmission, WHAV-LP's audio is also carried in part, by a number of public, educational, and government access (PEG) cable television stations.

== History ==
In the fall of 2013, Public Media of New England, Inc. submitted WHAV's application to the Federal Communications Commission (FCC) for an LPFM license at 98.1 MHz. This was later changed to 97.9 MHz, and a construction permit was granted on January 9, 2015, with the callsign WHAV-LP. The station went on the air in September 2016, and was licensed the following month.

== See also ==
- List of community radio stations in the United States
