= Liz Wilde =

American radio personality (born 1971)

- Born: Anne Whittemore; October 27, 1963 (age 62); Dayton, Ohio
- Died: October 2024
- Presenting career
- Show: The Liz Wilde Show
- Station: Various
- Style: Talk Show Host
- Country: United States
- Website: www.lizwilde.com

Liz Wilde (born Anne Whittemore) was an American radio personality best known for her shock jock radio program Liz Wilde. After much success at WSHE as the evening air personality, Liz moved her show to the Northeast, taking over the night shift of rock station WAAF in the Boston, Massachusetts radio market. After having great success in the evening slot for 18 months, The Liz Wilde Show was moved to afternoon drive-time setting record ratings for WAAF and making them competitive with rival rock station WBCN (FM) in that daypart for the first time. With her ratings success in Boston, Wilde moved to WLUP in Chicago, Illinois in March 1995. Her show aired in the morning drive-time slot from 6am-10am on WPLL in Fort Lauderdale, Florida. She moved on to rock-and-roll pioneering station WMMS 100.7 FM in Cleveland, Ohio. Her show also aired on KLLI in the Dallas/Fort Worth, Texas market, and most recently on WRXK in Ft. Myers, Florida from November 2004 until March 2006.

At the pinnacle of the Liz Wilde Show's popularity, the show was nationally syndicated on over 34 radio stations in 2001 by radio company Fisher Entertainment. The company dropped the show after selling its Portland, Oregon stations KOTK and KWJJ to Entercom Communications, and merging the Fisher Entertainment division and other Fisher subsidiaries into the main company Fisher Communications.

== Biography ==
Wilde started her career at WAIL in Key West, Florida as "Anne with a Plan". After moving to Miami, Florida rock station WSHE Anne was suggested to pick a new name by the program director. From that point forward in her career she was known as Liz Wilde. After much success at WSHE as the evening air personality, Liz moved her show to the Northeast, taking over the night shift of rock station WAAF in the Boston, Massachusetts radio market. After having great success in the evening slot for 18 months, The Liz Wilde Show was moved to afternoon drive-time setting record ratings for WAAF and making them competitive with rival rock station WBCN (FM) in that daypart for the first time. With her ratings success in Boston, Wilde moved to WLUP-FM in Chicago, Illinois in March 1995. Her show aired in the morning drive-time slot on WPLL in Fort Lauderdale, Florida. She moved on to rock-and-roll pioneering station WMMS 100.7 FM in Cleveland, Ohio. Her show also aired on KLLI in the Dallas/Fort Worth, Texas market, and most recently on WRXK in Ft. Myers, Florida from November 2004 until March 2006.

The Liz Wilde Show aired on numerous stations, including:

- WLUP 97.9FM The Loop in Chicago, Illinois
- WINZ SuperTalk 940AM, WSHE 103.5FM later rebranded WPLL 103.5 Planet Radio (now WMIB 103.5 the Beat) all serving the Miami/Fort Lauderdale market in Florida
- WMMS 100.7 FM "The Buzzard" in Cleveland, Ohio
- KOTK Hot Talk 1080AM (now KFXX 1080 The Fan) in Portland, Oregon
- KYNG 105.3FM The Talk...That Rocks, later rebranded KLLI Live 105.3 serving the Dallas/Fort Worth, Texas radio market.

Wilde died of cancer in October 2024.
