= WLLH =

Tropical music radio station in Lawrence, Massachusetts

- Lawrence, Massachusetts; United States
- Broadcast area: Merrimack Valley
- Frequency: 1400 kHz
- Branding: La Mega 95.1

Programming
- Language: Spanish
- Format: Latin pop–reggaeton–tropical music

Ownership
- Owner: Gois Broadcasting LLC; (Gois Broadcasting Boston LLC)
- Sister stations: WAMG; WNEZ; WORC

History
- First air date: October 1926 (in Somerville); October 27, 1927 (in Lexington); October 10, 1934 (in Lowell); December 1, 1937 (Lawrence transmitter)
- Former call signs: WAGS (1926–1927); WLEX (1927–1929); WLEY (1929–1934)
- Former frequencies: 1200 kHz (1926–1927); 1390 kHz (1927–1928); 1420 kHz (1928–1930); 1370 kHz (1930–1941)
- Call sign meaning: Lowell, Lawrence, Haverhill

Technical information
- Licensing authority: FCC
- Facility ID: 24971
- Class: C
- Power: 1,000 watts
- Transmitter coordinates: 42°42′27.33″N 71°9′49.21″W
- Translator: 95.1 W236CU (Lowell)

Links
- Public license information: Public file; LMS
- Webcast: Listen live
- Website: www.lamegaenvivo.com/mega95

WLLH (1400 kHz, La Mega 95.1) is a commercial radio station in Lawrence, Massachusetts, United States, serving the Merrimack Valley region. The station is owned by Gois Broadcasting, LLC, and airs a Latin pop, reggaeton and tropical music format. The transmitter site is on Common Street, near the Lawrence Police Department Headquarters.

WLLH is also heard on FM translator W236CU at 95.1 MHz in Lowell, with its 170–watt transmitter located off Holmes Road. The station uses its translator frequency in its moniker, "Mega 95.1 FM".

From 1937 until 2019, WLLH operated with an unusual configuration of synchronized dual transmitters, located in Lowell and Lawrence, which broadcast on a common frequency.

== History ==
=== WAGS and WLEX ===
The station was first authorized as WAGS in October 1926. It was only powered at 5 watts, broadcasting on 1200 kHz, and was licensed to Somerville, Massachusetts, near Boston. Its call letters stood for "Willow Avenue Garage Station". During September–October 1927, the station moved to Lexington, and it returned to the air on October 27, 1927, as WLEX at 1390 kHz with 50 watts. It was located in the home of part-owner Carl Wheeler, who shared station ownership with Jesse Smith Dodge.

The station time-shared with South Dartmouth station WMAF. On November 11, 1928, under the provisions of the Federal Radio Commission's General Order 40, WLEX moved to 1420 kHz with 100 watts, time-sharing with Boston-based religious station WSSH.

=== WLEY ===
WLEX was renamed WLEY, after Carl Wheeler's company, the Lexington Air Stations, purchased WBET from the Boston Evening Transcript, moved it from Medford to Lexington in February 1929, and transferred the WLEX call sign to the relocated station. During this time, the stations also operated an experimental television station, W1XAY.

WLEY remained at 1420 kHz until 1930, when it moved to 1370 (concurrent with WLEX's move from 1360 to 1410 kHz). W1XAY shut down in 1930, and WLEX was sold off in 1931, but the Lexington Air Stations retained WLEY until 1933.

=== WLLH ===
WLEY was purchased by Alfred Moffat, who changed the call letters to WLLH on August 13, 1934, and moved the station from Lexington to Lowell on October 10, 1934. Moffat boosted the station's daytime power to 250 watts from a transmitter and studio location at the Rex Center, and affiliated it with the Yankee Network, and the Mutual-affiliated Colonial Network the next year.

=== Synchronous operation begun ===
Moffat also worked to establish a second "synchronous amplifier" transmitter about 9 miles (14 km) away in Lawrence, which began operating with up to 100 watts under a "special experimental authorization" on December 1, 1937, with a license for the Lawrence transmitter being issued on March 4, 1941.

The dual WLLH transmitters moved to 1400 kHz on March 29, 1941, with the implementation of the North American Regional Broadcasting Agreement (NARBA). Ed McMahon began his career in 1942 as an announcer for WLLH. In addition, the station began an FM sister station in 1947, 99.5 WLLH-FM (now WCRB).

A company called WLLH, Inc. acquired the dual operation in 1963. In the 1960s and 1970s, WLLH carried a contemporary hit radio format with local news and weather updates. By the 1980s, the station moved to a full service adult contemporary sound. But as younger people switched to FM stations for their music, WLLH had to adjust its playlist. In 1985, WLLH switched to a country music format. By the 1990s, under Arnold Lerner's Merrimack Valley Wireless Talking Machine Company, WLLH had adopted an adult standards format, and was the radio home of the Lowell Spinners minor league baseball team.

WLLH was sold to Mega Communications in 1999, and switched to a simulcast of Spanish-language tropical music station WNFT (1150 AM, soon renamed WAMG) that April; some of WLLH's staff, as well as Spinners games, moved to WCCM (800 AM, now WNNW). The WAMG simulcast continued after that station moved to 890 AM in 2003, following the sale of 1150 AM (now WWDJ) to Salem Communications.

Mega sold WAMG and WLLH to J Sports in 2005. On July 24, the stations returned to English-language programming and switched to ESPN Radio. Most programming was simulcast on both stations, though WLLH again carried Lowell Spinners baseball, replacing WCAP, during the 2007 season; after that season, the team returned to WCAP.

WAMG and WLLH discontinued ESPN Radio programming on September 14, 2009. The sports format was dropped, and the stations temporarily went dark. While the station was silent, on October 9, 2009, Merrimack College announced that Merrimack Warriors ice hockey games would be broadcast on WLLH beginning on November 13.

WLLH logo prior to redesign

WLLH returned to the air in late October 2009, once again carrying Spanish-language tropical music under the "La Nueva Mega" branding. The new format was programmed by Gois Broadcasting, owner of WORC in Worcester and three Connecticut radio stations, under a local marketing agreement (LMA); Gois would purchase WLLH outright in January 2010.

=== Synchronous operation ended ===
Ultimately both WLLH transmitters operated at 1,000 watts using non-directional antennas on AM 1400. However, in 2019, the station lost access to the Lowell transmitter site, which had been considered its primary location. With the elimination of the Lowell operation, WLLH continued to broadcast from the formerly secondary site at Lawrence, and changed its community of license to that city. Service to Lowell was replaced by FM translator W236CU at 95.1 MHz.

== Translator ==
Broadcast translator for WLLH
Call sign	Frequency	City of license	FID	ERP (W)	Class	Transmitter coordinates	FCC info
W236CU	95.1 FM	Lowell, Massachusetts	139030	170	D	42°39′14″N 71°13′0″W	LMS

== See also ==
- WAMG
