= WAMG =

Tropical music radio station in Boston

- Dedham, Massachusetts; United States
- Broadcast area: Greater Boston
- Frequency: 890 kHz
- Branding: La Mega 96.5

Programming
- Language: Spanish
- Format: Tropical music

Ownership
- Owner: Gois Broadcasting LLC; (Gois Broadcasting Boston LLC)
- Sister stations: WORC; WLLH

History
- First air date: October 1, 1994
- Former call signs: WBMA (1994–1995); WBPS (1995–2003)
- Call sign meaning: "Mega"

Technical information
- Licensing authority: FCC
- Facility ID: 6475
- Class: B
- Power: 25,000 watts (day); 6,000 watts (night)
- Transmitter coordinates: 42°14′50.35″N 71°25′29.22″W
- Translator: 96.5 W243DC (Boston)

Links
- Public license information: Public file; LMS
- Website: www.lamegaenvivo.com/mega96

WAMG (890 kHz, "La Mega 96.5") is a commercial AM radio station in the Boston market licensed to Dedham, Massachusetts. It is owned by Gois Broadcasting. It broadcasts in Spanish, and plays bachata, merengue, salsa and Latin pop. WLS in Chicago is the dominant (class A) station on 890 AM; WAMG must reduce power during the nighttime hours and uses a directional antenna to protect the nighttime skywave signal of WLS.

WAMG also operates translator W243DC (96.5 FM) in Boston.

== History ==
WAMG first came on the air in 1994, as WBMA, initially airing a Spanish-language religious format that gradually migrated from WBIV (now WQOM). In 1995, the station adopted a sports radio format, affiliated with the Prime Sports network. The station also adopted the call letters of WBPS at this time, which remained with the station for many years, even after the station dropped sports for brokered ethnic programs in 1996.

In 1998, WBPS was acquired by Mega Communications, and on December 1, the station adopted a Spanish adult contemporary format, initially as "Estrella 890" before becoming "Amor 890".

After the failure of a Spanish-language all-news radio format on WNNY (now WKDM) in New York City, Mega began to broker many of the company's stations. Consequently, on December 1, 2001, Mega began leasing WBPS to CNET, at which time the station adopted the technology news/talk format of "CNET Radio", as a simulcast of KNEW.

After CNET's programming left WBPS in 2002, Mega began leasing the station to Chicago-based Air Time Media. This group launched a conservative talk radio format on WBPS, which was known as the "Boston Talk Party".

In 2003, Mega sold the company's other Boston station, WAMG ("Mega 1150"), to Salem Communications. In order to retain the successful Spanish-language tropical music format of WAMG, Mega moved the format and call letters to the 890 frequency, canceling Air Time's lease on the station. Some of the hosts which were dropped from WBPS landed on 1150, which Salem re-launched as conservative talk station WTTT (that station is now WWDJ).

Additionally, when WAMG relocated to 890 as "Mega 890", the frequency inherited the format's simulcast on WLLH (1400 AM) in Lowell and Lawrence, which was not included in 1150's sale to Salem.

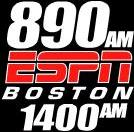
Logo as "890 ESPN", used from July 2005 until September 14, 2009

In 2005, Mega Communications announced the sale of WAMG and WLLH to WallerSutton 2000, an investment firm, in cooperation with locally owned "J Sports". Upon closure of the sale, WAMG dropped the Spanish tropical format and reverted to a sports format, this time affiliated with ESPN Radio. The station also added a local afternoon show featuring Michael Felger, and used the branding of "ESPN Boston". (The last broadcast of The Mike Felger Show was on July 10, 2008). Other local programs heard on the station included Salk & Halloran, Lew & Mike, Celtic Pride, and The New England Hockey Journal. The station was also the home of Northeastern University football and men's hockey. Through its ESPN Radio affiliation, WAMG also served as the Boston outlet for Mike and Mike in the Morning, The Herd with Colin Cowherd, The Scott Van Pelt Show, The Doug Gottlieb Show, and All Night with Jason Smith, as well as ESPN Radio's play-by-play broadcasts, such as Bowl Championship Series, the World Series, and the National Invitation Tournament.

On August 3, 2006, WAMG was the first to report that veteran major league catcher Javy López was being traded from the Baltimore Orioles to the Boston Red Sox. The trade was designed to fill a hole caused by the recent injury to Jason Varitek. The next day, the trade was announced as official; the Orioles received cash and a player to be named later (Adam Stern) in return.

WAMG's logo prior to redesign

WAMG discontinued ESPN Radio programming on September 14, 2009; the transmitter was shut off at 5:00 p.m. Gois returned the station to the air on December 3, 2009, reverting it again to Spanish-language programming with the current format, branded "La Nueva Mega"; simulcast partner WLLH had returned to the air with this format in late October. Initially operating the station under a local marketing agreement, Gois purchased WAMG outright in January 2010.

== Translator ==
Call sign	Frequency	City of license	FID	ERP (W)	Class	Transmitter coordinates	FCC info
W243DC	96.5 FM	Boston, Massachusetts	148707	99	D	42°21′8.1″N 71°3′22.6″W	LMS

Gois Broadcasting announced its purchase of W243DC in late 2023; this facility, which transmits from One Financial Center, had previously been owned by Northeast Broadcasting as a translator of WXRV. WAMG was previously relayed by W235CS (94.9 FM) in Dedham; that translator was sold to Blount Masscom in 2024 to relay WILD.
