= WARV (AM) =

- Warwick, Rhode Island; United States
- Broadcast area: Providence area
- Frequency: 1590 kHz
- Branding: Life Changing Radio

Programming
- Format: Christian radio
- Affiliations: Salem Radio Network

Ownership
- Owner: Blount Communications, Inc.
- Sister stations: WILD; WVNE

History
- First air date: August 13, 1959; 66 years ago
- Former call signs: WYNG (1959–1967)

Technical information
- Licensing authority: FCC
- Facility ID: 5882
- Class: B
- Power: 8,000 watts (day); 5,000 watts (night)
- Transmitter coordinates: 41°43′40.36″N 71°27′44.21″W
- Translator: 92.7 W224DG (Warwick)

Links
- Public license information: Public file; LMS
- Webcast: Available on website
- Website: www.lifechangingradio.com/rhode-island-warv/

WARV (1590 AM) is a radio station broadcasting a Christian radio format. Licensed to Warwick, Rhode Island, United States, the station serves the Providence area. The station is owned by Blount Communications, Inc. and features programming from Salem Radio Network.

== Translators ==
| Call sign | Frequency | City of license | FID | ERP (W) | HAAT | Class | Transmitter coordinates | FCC info |
|---|---|---|---|---|---|---|---|---|
| W224DG | 92.7 FM | Warwick, Rhode Island | 140739 | 250 | 27 m (89 ft) | D | 41°48′29.8″N 71°28′17.9″W | LMS |
