= Haverhill Gazette =

Weekly newspaper in Massachusetts, US

- Type: Weekly newspaper
- Owner(s): CNHI
- Publisher: John Celestino
- Managing editor: Tracey Rauh
- General manager: Jim Falzone
- Founded: 1821
- Headquarters: 100 Turnpike St, North Andover, MA
- Website: hgazette.com

The Haverhill Gazette (est. 1821) is a weekly newspaper in Haverhill, Massachusetts, owned by Community Newspaper Holdings Inc. of Montgomery, Alabama. For at least part of its history, it was a daily. In 1998 the paper was bought by the Eagle Tribune Company and converted to a weekly. In 2005 it was bought by Community Newspaper Holdings. The publisher is John Celestino, who oversees the Haverhill Gazette and its sister papers in the North of Boston Media Group.

== History ==
Nathan Burrill and Caleb Hersey established the paper in 1821 in Haverhill; politically it supported the Federalists. In 1823 the paper absorbed the Essex Patriot. Among the Gazette's editors: Edward G. Frothingham, John H. Harris, Arthur Asa Hill, Isaac R. Howe, E.P. Rodgers, William Ellsworth Smythe, Jeremiah Spofford, Abijah W. Thayer, John Greenleaf Whittier. Publishers have included Howard & Hill. By 1904 it had a circulation of about 8,000 subscribers.

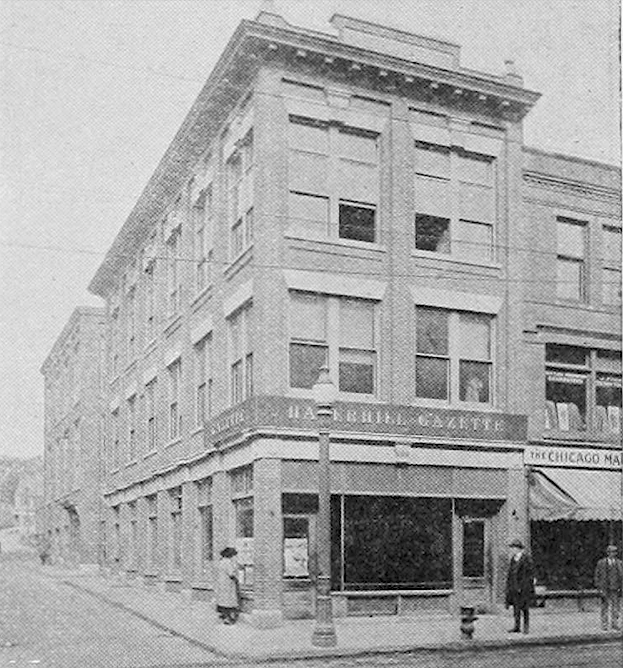
Haverhill Gazette building, Merrimack Street, Haverhill, Massachusetts, 1919

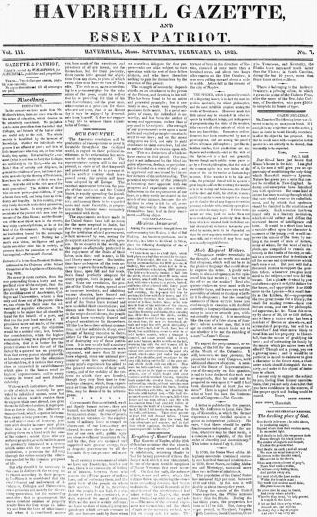
Haverhill Gazette and Essex Patriot, 1823 (American Antiquarian Society)

Following a strike in 1957 by Local 38 of the International Typographical Union during which it employed replacement printers, the paper found itself in competition with the Haverhill Journal, a daily founded by William Loeb, publisher of the Manchester (N.H.) Union Leader. The new competition was founded after several local business owners sought out a new newspaper to carry its advertising without offending the sensibilities of the significant numbers of Haverhill residents who were members of various shoe manufacturing unions. They prevailed on Loeb to publish a free shopper. Loeb, encouraged by favorable reaction to the first editions of the shopper, launched a daily in December 1957. Haverhill this became one of only three cities in Massachusetts with newspapers owned by competing publishers, the others being in Boston and Lynn.

The Gazette was purchased by Newspapers of New England, Inc., a consortium of newspaper publishers who intended to "save" the Gazette and prevent Loeb from gaining inroads into publishing in Massachusetts, and matched Loeb's offer for the paper.

The Gazette's owners included principally the Lowell Sun; The Holyoke Transcript-Telegram; the Brockton Enterprise & Times; Essex County Newspapers Inc. owner of The Newburyport News and The Gloucester Times; the Springfield Union and Springfield Daily News; and the Lawrence Eagle-Tribune. Other members of a 96 publisher association also owned less significant stakes.

Loeb sued the Haverhill Gazette Co., Newspapers of New England and its individual managers over antitrust issues. Gazette Co. counterclaimed on the same grounds. Gazette Co. won the suit, after the court found violations of antitrust law in the Journal's solicitation of advertisers.

In his ruling, Judge Charles Wyzanski found that based on costs and revenues for newspaper publishing "Haverhill is economically a one newspaper city." The court found that NNE had also violated antitrust laws, but excused the behavior as a defensive maneuver.

After losing on appeal Loeb suspended the Journal after losing the federal court case which found his company had violated antitrust laws to keep the journal in business.

During the battle, Loeb's expenses were extremely high. Union contracts at his plant in Manchester, New Hampshire, provided that a day's work for printers consisted of printing a single publication. Thus his press room was being paid overtime starting at mid-week.

Newspapers of New England subsequently sold the paper to Hagadone Newspapers of Idaho which later transferred the paper to Scripps League Newspapers, Inc. of Virginia in a combination sale including a newspaper in Elizabeth, New Jersey.

Scripps League sold its newspapers in 1998 to Pulitzer Newspapers, Inc., which subsequently sold the Gazette to a company owned by the family which controlled the Eagle Tribune of North Andover, Massachusetts, ending a newspaper competition in Haverhill between the Eagle Tribune and the Gazette. Eagle Tribune subsequently converted the Gazette from a daily to weekly.

Jessica Bruder cited the conversion of the Gazette from a daily to a weekly in an article asking, "Is the death of newspapers the end of good citizenship?" During the three years after the Gazette was converted from a daily to a weekly, "the town-owned Hale Municipal Hospital lost $15 million ... . Inaccurate filings by a private manager obscured the extent of the problem, which piled on top of preexisting debt and led to the hospital's sale in 2001. Citizens are still on the hook, repaying $7 million annually until 2023." Bruder mentioned some in the community who claimed that if the Gazette had continued as a full-featured daily, its more robust reporting would have made it harder for the private manager to conceal the hospital's financial problems for so long. Al White, editor of the Eagle-Tribune, disagreed. "Name one community where people won't say that," he said. "This is a silly conversation."

== Variant titles ==
- Haverhill Gazette and Essex Patriot, 1823–1827
- Gazette & Patriot, 1824–1825
- Essex Gazette, 1827–1836, 1839–1840
- Haverhill Essex Gazette, 1838
- Haverhill Evening Gazette (daily), 188?–1947
- The Gazette (daily), 1978–1984
