= WNNW =

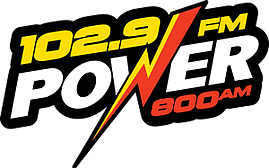
- Lawrence, Massachusetts; United States
- Broadcast area: Merrimack Valley
- Frequency: 800 kHz
- Branding: Power 800 AM/102.9 FM

Programming
- Format: Spanish tropical

Ownership
- Owner: Costa-Eagle Radio Ventures, LP
- Sister stations: WUBG; WMVX

History
- First air date: August 1947
- Former call signs: WCCM (1947–2002)

Technical information
- Licensing authority: FCC
- Facility ID: 14752
- Class: B
- Power: 3,000 watts day; 244 watts night
- Transmitter coordinates: 42°40′26.33″N 71°11′24.21″W
- Translator: 102.9 W275BH (Lawrence)

Links
- Public license information: Public file; LMS
- Webcast: Listen live
- Website: power800am.com

WNNW (800 AM; "Power 800 AM/102.9 FM") is a commercial radio station licensed to Lawrence, Massachusetts, United States. The station is owned by Costa-Eagle Radio Ventures, LP, a partnership between Pat Costa and the Lawrence Eagle-Tribune newspaper. WNNW airs a Spanish-language tropical music format.

WNNW's transmitter is off Chandler Road in Andover, Massachusetts. The station broadcasts at 3,000 watts by day; because AM 800 is a clear channel frequency reserved for Mexico, WNNW must reduce power at night to 244 watts. It uses a non-directional antenna at all times. WNNW is also heard on FM translator W275BH at 102.9 MHz, which also uses the same Andover tower as the AM station.

Established in 1947 as WCCM, the station was owned by sportscaster Curt Gowdy from 1963 to 1997, and featured a full service format with middle of the road music, talk, and Spanish-language programming. After Costa-Eagle acquired the station, it briefly shifted from adult standards to adult contemporary in 1998, but returned to standards a year later. In early 2002, WCCM replaced most of its music with increased talk and sports programming; a rearrangement of the Costa-Eagle stations' programming that September resulted in the 800 kHz facility being taken over by WNNW and its Spanish tropical programming. It has operated an FM translator since 2009.

== History ==
The 800 kHz frequency in Lawrence first signed on the air in August 1947. Its call sign was WCCM and it was owned by Lawrence Broadcasting Company. An FM sister station, WGHJ at 93.7 MHz (today WEEI-FM) was launched in April 1960 as a full-time simulcast of WCCM.

In 1963, WCCM and WGHJ were sold to sportscaster Curt Gowdy, who changed WGHJ's call letters to WCCM-FM that year. Both stations carried a full service middle of the road music format. In 1974, the simulcast ended. The FM station became WCGY, first airing a Top 40 format and later switching to album rock. WCCM continued on AM 800, with some talk and Spanish programming. As younger people switched to FM for their music, WCCM flipped to adult standards.

After Curt Gowdy sold WCGY to American Radio Systems in 1994, WCCM was put up for sale. However, a buyer was not found until 1997, when the Costa-Eagle partnership agreed to purchase the station. Soon after taking over a year later, Costa-Eagle shifted the station from adult standards to full service adult contemporary.

The following year, WCCM began marketing itself to the Lowell area, after WLLH (1400 AM) was sold and converted to Spanish-language programming. WCCM opened a Lowell studio and hired several former WLLH personalities including news anchor Bob Ellis. It began carrying Lowell Spinners baseball, which had previously aired on WLLH. WCCM also began shifting back to standards, replacing satellite talk programming from Talk America with the Music of Your Life network a few months later.

The Lowell studio was closed in 2002 after the station gradually phased out its use. WCCM also ended out much of its music programming, with local talk shows during the day and sports radio programming from ESPN Radio during evenings, nights, and weekends.

The station was assigned the WNNW call letters on August 29, 2002. It was part of a larger shuffle that resulted in WNNW moving its Spanish tropical format from 1110 AM, WCCM moving to 1490 AM, and the programming of WHAV (1490 AM) moving to 1110 AM as WCEC. The changes formally took effect on-air that September.

In 2008, owner Pat Costa received Radio Ink Magazine's Medallas de Cortez Award for General Manager of the Year. Later that year, Costa-Eagle purchased W275BH, a construction permit for an FM translator at 102.9 MHz in Newton, New Hampshire. Costa-Eagle moved it to 92.1 FM in Lawrence in 2009 (thereby changing its call letters to W221CH). It signed on that March as a simulcast of WNNW. In June 2011, the translator was moved to 102.9 FM (reclaiming the W275BH callsign) due to interference complaints from WFEX in Derry, New Hampshire, and WPHX-FM in Sanford, Maine.

== Translators ==
Broadcast translator for WNNW
Call sign	Frequency	City of license	FID	ERP (W)	Class	Transmitter coordinates	FCC info	Notes
W275BH	102.9 FM	Lawrence, Massachusetts	155444	215	D	42°40′26.3″N 71°11′24.2″W	LMS	(HD Radio)
