= WXRV =

Radio station in Andover, Massachusetts, United States

- Andover, Massachusetts; United States
- Broadcast area: Merrimack Valley; Greater Boston; Southern New Hampshire
- Frequency: 92.5 MHz
- Branding: 92.5 The River

Programming
- Format: Adult album alternative

Ownership
- Owner: Northeast Broadcasting; (Beanpot License Corp.)

History
- First air date: June 1959
- Former call signs: WHAV-FM (1959–1983); WLYT (1983–1995)
- Call sign meaning: "River"

Technical information
- Licensing authority: FCC
- Facility ID: 49385
- Class: B
- ERP: 25,000 watts
- HAAT: 217 meters (712 ft)
- Transmitter coordinates: 42°46′23.3″N 71°5′59.2″W
- Repeater: See § Boosters

Links
- Public license information: Public file; LMS
- Webcast: Listen live; Listen live (MP3)
- Website: theriverboston.com

WXRV (92.5 FM, "The River") is an adult album alternative radio station licensed to Andover, Massachusetts, and based in Haverhill, with a signal covering most of northeast Massachusetts and southern New Hampshire, and audible as far away as Plymouth, Massachusetts, and Portland, Maine.

== Background ==
The station's slogan is "Independent Radio", proclaiming its status as being a single station separate from the large mass-media conglomerates such as iHeartMedia and Audacy with freedom from the idea of corporate playlists and national content. This enables WXRV to play a wide variety of music, ranging from blues and folk to contemporary alternative and classic rock, as well as songs from numerous local musicians and lesser-known musical acts.

Despite the station's transmitter location, WXRV attempts to serve the Greater Boston area primarily; its signal also reaches into the nearby Manchester and Portsmouth markets. To overcome signal issues near Boston, the station applied for four on-channel booster stations in the Boston and MetroWest areas in August 2015.

The studios are still located in Haverhill, in the original WHAV art deco building. The current station inherited a facility on the top floor of its studio, now called the River Music Hall, which was designed for broadcasting live performances in the pre-rock era and is used today to broadcast live performances and to record performances for later broadcast. In 2007, their studio location began using photo-voltaic solar power for a portion of the station's power consumption, making it one of the few such solar-powered radio stations in the world at the time.

Starting in 2001 the River began its Riverfest Festival each summer. It is currently held in Salisbury, Massachusetts, and has had performers such as Guster, Brandi Carlile, Matt Nathanson, Barenaked Ladies, Eric Hutchinson, Fastball, Anderson East, Phillip Phillips, and Frank Turner appear.

As of 2025, current on-air staff includes Dana Marshall (host of the Sunday morning 'Brunch By the River' program), Randi Kirshbaum, Carolyn Morrell, AJ Crozby, Duncan, Lori D, Travis, Olivia Lowe (host of 'Under the Covers'), and Stephanie Battaglia. Past on-air personalities include Annalisa Pop and Rita Cary.

== Broadcast history ==
Originating in 1947 as WHAV, an AM station in Haverhill, an FM station was founded in 1948, but went dark in the early 1950s. WHAV-FM was restored to its current frequency in 1959. It became soft rock-formatted WLYT (Lite 92.5) in 1983, and gained its current identity as WXRV on August 1, 1995.

For several months after Northeast Broadcasting acquired WKBR (1250 AM) in Manchester, New Hampshire, in 1997, that station offered a temporary simulcast of WXRV. The station is now separately-owned WGAM.

In February 1999, WXRV began simulcasting on WVFM (105.7 FM) in Campton, New Hampshire, which Northeast Broadcasting had just acquired. For a brief time during 2012 and 2013, the station—which in 2005 had been renamed first WUSX and then WLKC—was programmed separately (though retaining the "River" branding and AAA format), before returning to the WXRV simulcast. In 2014, Northeast Broadcasting acquired a second New Hampshire station, WWHK (102.3 FM) in Concord; that station began broadcasting WXRV programming on May 2, 2014, though WWHK broadcast separate news, weather, and advertising. On March 28, 2016, WWHK changed its call letters to WXRG. WXRG and WLKC were sold to the Educational Media Foundation in 2020.

In 2008, WXRV began simulcasting in the northwest part of Central Massachusetts on WXRG (99.9 FM), licensed to Athol, Massachusetts, which itself was rebroadcast on daytime station WTUB (700 AM) in Orange and Athol starting in late 2011. In April 2013, WXRG took on the WFNX call sign, which had been previously used by an alternative rock station in Boston owned by the Boston Phoenix, first on 101.7 FM (now WBWL) and later as an Internet radio station; Northeast Broadcasting acquired the call letters after that station shut down along with the Phoenix. WFNX and WWBZ (the former WTUB) dropped the WXRV simulcast in May 2014 and began stunting with a wide range of music while preparing to launch new formats for the stations on June 9, with listeners being asked to vote on which of the songs being played should be included in the new formats.

In May 2016, WFNX announced that it would end the variety hits format after May 29, 2016, and return to simulcasting WXRV, citing a lack of advertiser support; in its announcement, WFNX said it needed ten businesses to advertise on the stations on an annual basis to cover their operations costs. WFAT (the former WWBZ) concurrently announced that it would also resume a simulcast of WXRV, but continued to broadcast its oldies format until Northeast Broadcasting sold it to Saga Communications in January 2019 (the station is now WQVD). WFNX continued simulcasting WXRV until 2020 when it was sold to the Educational Media Foundation and became K-Love station WKMY.

In late May 2014, WXRV added a translator in Needham, Massachusetts, W243DC (96.5 FM); the initial application for this facility had been made in 2003. In 2023, Northeast Broadcasting sold W243DC—by then relocated to One Financial Center in Boston—for $550,000 to Gois Broadcasting; it would become a translator for WAMG.

== Boosters ==
Call sign	Frequency	City of license	FID	ERP (W)	HAAT	Class	Transmitter coordinates	FCC info
WXRV-FM1	92.5 FM	Framingham, Massachusetts	198698	33 (horiz.); 99 (vert.)	34 m (112 ft)	D	42°18′23″N 71°22′45.2″W	LMS
WXRV-FM2	92.5 FM	Dover, Massachusetts	198697	33 (horiz.); 99 (vert.)	139 m (456 ft)	D	42°22′42.4″N 71°16′3.1″W	LMS
WXRV-FM3	92.5 FM	Newton, Massachusetts	198696	33 (horiz.); 99 (vert.)	104 m (341 ft)	D	42°24′51.1″N 71°12′37.2″W	LMS
WXRV-FM4	92.5 FM	Boston, Massachusetts	198695	400 (horiz.); 1,200 (vert.)	32 m (105 ft)	D	42°23′13.3″N 71°4′34″W	LMS
WXRV-FM5	92.5 FM	Boston, Massachusetts	198907	24 (horiz.); 24 (vert.)	237 m (778 ft)	D	42°20′57.4″N 71°4′29.2″W	LMS
