= WDER =

Radio station in Derry, New Hampshire

WDER and WDER-FM

WDER: Derry, New Hampshire; WDER-FM: Peterborough, New Hampshire; United States
- Broadcast area: Manchester–Nashua, New Hampshire
- Frequencies: WDER: 1320 kHz; WDER-FM: 92.1 MHz
- Branding: WDER 1320 AM/92.1 FM

Programming
- Format: Christian radio
- Affiliations: Salem Radio Network

Ownership
- Owner: Blount Communications; (Blount Communications, Inc. of NH)
- Sister stations: WBCI; WILD; WVNE

History
- First air date: WDER: October 1983; WDER-FM: May 1972
- Former call signs: WDER-FM: WSLE (1972–1981); WMDK (1981–1989); WMDK-FM (1989–1991); WNHQ (1991–1999); WFEX (1999–2012)
- Call sign meaning: Derry

Technical information
- Licensing authority: FCC
- Facility ID: WDER: 61615; WDER-FM: 52399
- Class: WDER: B; WDER-FM: A
- Power: WDER: 10,000 watts (day); 600 watts (night)
- ERP: WDER-FM: 170 watts
- HAAT: WDER-FM: 423 meters (1,388 ft)
- Transmitter coordinates: WDER: 42°52′1.31″N 71°17′16.22″W; WDER-FM: 42°51′41.3″N 71°52′43.28″W
- Translator(s): WDER: 92.1 W221EM (Derry)

Links
- Public license information: WDER: Public file; LMS; WDER-FM: Public file; LMS
- Webcast: Listen live
- Website: www.lifechangingradio.com/new-hampshire-wder/

WDER (1320 AM) and WDER-FM (92.1 FM) are radio stations broadcasting a Christian radio format. They are the flagship stations of the "Life Changing Radio" network. WDER AM is licensed to Derry, New Hampshire, and WDER-FM is licensed to Peterborough, New Hampshire. The stations are owned by Blount Communications, Inc. of NH and feature programming from Salem Radio Network.

In 2012, Blount Communications purchased 92.1 FM, then WFEX, from Phoenix Media/Communications Group, and changed the call letters to WDER-FM, providing WDER AM with a sister station on the FM band to extend its outreach. Prior to the purchase, WFEX had served as a simulcast of WFNX (now WBWL) in Boston.

== Translator ==
Broadcast translator for WDER (AM)
| Call sign | Frequency | City of license | FID | ERP (W) | Class | Transmitter coordinates | FCC info |
|---|---|---|---|---|---|---|---|
| W221EM | 92.1 FM | Derry, New Hampshire | 202248 | 250 | D | 42°51′59″N 71°17′15.7″W | LMS |
