= WMVX (AM) =

- Salem, New Hampshire; United States
- Broadcast area: Merrimack Valley
- Frequency: 1110 kHz
- Branding: Valley 98.9

Programming
- Language: English
- Format: Classic hits

Ownership
- Owner: Costa-Eagle Radio Ventures LTD. Ptp.
- Sister stations: WUBG; WNNW

History
- First air date: January 10, 1977
- Former call signs: WVNH (1977–1988); WNNW (1988–2002); WCCM (2002); WCEC (2002–2007); WCCM (2007–2017)

Technical information
- Licensing authority: FCC
- Facility ID: 13998
- Class: D
- Power: 5,000 watts day only
- Transmitter coordinates: 42°45′42.32″N 71°16′11.22″W
- Translator: 98.9 W255DA (Salem)

Links
- Public license information: Public file; LMS
- Webcast: Listen live
- Website: valley989.com

WMVX (1110 kHz; "Valley 98.9") is an AM radio station broadcasting a classic hits format. Established in 1977 as WVNH, the station is licensed to serve Salem, New Hampshire, United States, and is owned by Costa-Eagle Radio Ventures LTD. Ptp., a partnership between Pat Costa and his chief investor, The Eagle-Tribune. The station's programming is also heard on translator station W255DA (98.9 FM) in Salem.

WMVX is only licensed to operate from local sunrise until 30 minutes after local sunset (the latter with reduced power); this is to protect WBT in Charlotte, North Carolina. However, in the fall and winter months, it is not unusual for WMVX to be heard before sunrise.

== History ==
The 1110 frequency in Salem, New Hampshire, first signed on January 10, 1977, as WVNH, a middle-of-the-road station owned by Salem Broadcasters. The station was sold in 1980 and under general manager Dick Lange shifted to a nostalgia format. Just a month or so before the new ownership returned WVNH to the air, a fire destroyed Rockingham Park. Without its anchor draw, the business climate in Salem withered and WVNH failed to generate enough revenue to sustain its original staff. In late 1981, however, under program director Russ Mottla (the station's morning man, who was retained) the station shifted to a big band/middle-of-the-road format which dramatically improved ratings. Despite the obvious drawback AM radio was by this time facing from FM, the Hughes family, which bought the station in 1984, restored the previous format.

In 1988, Costa Communications purchased the station, changed the call letters to WNNW, and implemented a talk format. Much of the station's programming was supplied by the Winner News Network, based out of motivational station WWNN in Pompano Beach, Florida. Initially run more-or-less as a hobby, owner Pat Costa soon discovered that the bulk of WNNW's profits came from its leased-time Spanish language programs, leading the station to a full-time Spanish tropical format in 1990. The station came under the operation of the Costa-Eagle partnership in 1996.

The station changed its call letters to WCCM on August 29, 2002, as part of a larger shuffle that resulted in WNNW moving to 800 AM, which had been WCCM since August 1947; WCCM in turn moved to 1490 AM, replacing WHAV, whose "Impacto" Spanish-language talk programming moved to the 1110 AM facility under the WCEC call sign. The changes took effect on-air that September; on September 6, the WCEC call sign was formally implemented.

Logo for the station as WCCM

The WCCM call sign returned on a permanent basis, accompanied by that station's English-language talk format, on August 1, 2007, following a format swap with 1490. Most of WCCM's programming was syndicated, with some local programming airing in middays and on weekends. Despite not being authorized to broadcast at night, on November 6, 2012, WCCM stayed on the air well past local sunset to broadcast election results in the Merrimack Valley areas of New Hampshire and Massachusetts. WCCM, along with sister stations WNNW and WCEC, were carried on FM translator station W275BH (102.9 FM) in a novel arrangement where three AM stations are carried on the same FM frequency through the use of HD Radio technology.

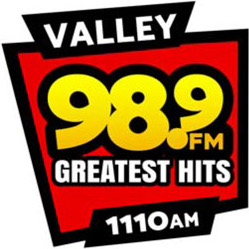
Logo used under the first alias of "Valley 98.9"

On April 1, 2017, following the launch of translator W255DA (98.9 FM), the station changed to a classic hits format branded as "Valley 98.9", with WCCM's talk format retained on the HD2 channel of W275BH as well as an Internet radio station. The call letters were concurrently changed to WMVX, swapping call letters with a sister station in Methuen, Massachusetts. "Valley 98.9" was dropped from WMVX's 1110 AM facility in August 2021, when Costa-Eagle moved the "Impacto" Spanish-language talk format back to the station from WCCM (1490 AM), which the company was in the process of selling. By 2025, when WMVX was cited by the Federal Communications Commission for transmitting an unmodulated carrier without any station identification, the station had resumed airing the "Valley 98.9" classic hits programming.

== Translators ==
Call sign	Frequency	City of license	FID	ERP (W)	Class	Transmitter coordinates	FCC info
W255DA	98.9 FM	Salem, New Hampshire	26367	154	D	42°49′0.3″N 71°16′11.2″W	LMS
