= WUBG (AM) =

Hispanic rhythmic/reggaeton radio station in Boston

- Methuen, Massachusetts; United States
- Broadcast area: Greater Boston
- Frequency: 1570 kHz
- Branding: La Pantera 105.3 FM and 1570 AM

Programming
- Language: Spanish
- Format: Hispanic rhythmic; regional Mexican

Ownership
- Owner: Costa-Eagle Radio Ventures Limited Partnership
- Operator: Costa Media Boston LLC
- Sister stations: WCCM; WMVX; WNNW

History
- First air date: December 22, 1963
- Former call signs: WMLO (1963–1979); WBVD (1979–1984); WNSH (1984–2012); WMVX (2012–2017); WCCM (2017–2018)
- Call sign meaning: "Big" (former format)

Technical information
- Licensing authority: FCC
- Facility ID: 22798
- Class: D
- Power: 44,000 watts (day); 140 watts (night)
- Transmitter coordinates: 42°40′26.3″N 71°11′24.2″W
- Translator: 105.3 W287CW (Methuen)

Links
- Public license information: Public file; LMS
- Webcast: Listen live
- Website: www.lapanteraboston.com

WUBG (1570 kHz) is a Spanish Latin pop and reggaeton, and regional Mexican station licensed to serve Methuen, Massachusetts. It has an FM translator, W287CW, at 105.3 MHz. The station is called "La Pantera". The WUBG transmitter is located in Andover, while W287CW's transmitter is in Medford. The station is owned by Costa-Eagle Radio Ventures Limited Partnership—a partnership between Pat Costa and The Eagle-Tribune. Under a local marketing agreement, WUBG is programmed by Costa Media Boston LLC, a similarly-named but separate company controlled by Jose Villafañe.

== History ==
The station signed on the air as WMLO, a 500-watt radio station originally licensed to Beverly, Massachusetts, on December 22, 1963. It changed its call sign to WBVD on December 5, 1979, and to WNSH on July 1, 1984. Its studios have been located in Danvers, in Salem (at Pickering Wharf), in two different buildings at Endicott College in Beverly, and on the second floor of a hardware warehouse in Hamilton.

In 2011, Willow Farm, Inc. sold WNSH for $400,000 to Costa-Eagle Broadcasting. In March 2011, Costa-Eagle changed the station to "Viva 1570". The format changed from tropical music, simulcasting Costa-Eagle sister station WNNW, to Spanish adult contemporary. On November 26, 2012, the call letters were changed to WMVX, after the rights to the WNSH call sign were acquired by Cumulus Media for use on one of its stations in the New York City market. WMVX switched to a Brazilian Portuguese music and talk format in July 2014. On October 8, 2014, the New England Revolution soccer team announced that WMVX would become its Portuguese-language flagship station.

In January 2013, WMVX was granted a U.S. Federal Communications Commission (FCC) construction permit to increase daytime power to 50,000 watts. Even with the anticipated increase to 50,000 watts, the maximum AM power allowed by the FCC, the permit required the station to reduce power at night to 85 watts because 1570 kHz is a Mexican clear channel frequency and WMVX must protect XERF in Ciudad Acuña, Coahuila, the Class A station on 1570. In 2016, the station switched its city of license from Beverly to Methuen with its transmitter in Andover, Massachusetts.

The station changed its call sign to WCCM on April 1, 2017. It swapped call letters with its sister station in Salem, New Hampshire. Also in 2017, the Brazilian Portuguese programming, branded "Nossa Radio", was dropped from the station. Its programmer, the International Church of the Grace of God, bought WBIX the following year, to air programming for the Boston area's Brazilian and Portuguese listeners. WCCM then returned to simulcasting WNNW, and briefly ran a separate Spanish-language music format branded "Galaxia".

In March 2018, the station was heard simulcasting sister station WMVX (with an FM translator at 98.9 MHz), running classic hits as "Valley 98.9". On April 2, 2018, 1570 AM started broadcasting a classic hits format separate from WMVX as "Big 105.3", in reflection of its own FM translator. On April 3, the call sign was changed to WUBG.

On July 1, 2019, WUBG's classic hits format went online-only as "Boston's Big-FM", while 1570 AM and the 105.3 translator switched to the Educational Media Foundation (EMF)'s "K-Love" contemporary Christian format. At the time, K-Love only had a limited presence in the Boston market via W260AS (99.9) in Lawrence and rimshot reception of WLVO in Providence, Rhode Island; the affiliation with WUBG predated EMF's acquisition of WAAF and WBOQ.

On May 29, 2022, the station dropped K-Love programming for a simulcast of the "LatinX" Spanish CHR programming of sister station WCCM, which is programmed by Jose Villafañe's Costa Media (a separate company from Costa-Eagle). In January 2024, the stations rebranded to "Exitos Boston", with no change in format.

== Translator ==
In addition to the main station, WUBG is relayed by an FM translator.

Call sign	Frequency	City of license	FID	ERP (W)	Class	Transmitter coordinates	FCC info
W287CW	105.3 FM	Methuen, Massachusetts	139956	250	D	42°25′52.3″N 71°05′17.2″W	LMS
