= Last Road Trip Download Series =

Last Road Trip

Live album by The Watchmen
- Released: 2004
- Recorded: December 16–31, 2003
- Genre: Rock
- Label: Independent

The Watchmen chronology
Slomotion (2001)	Last Road Trip (2004)

Last Road Trip was the farewell tour by The Watchmen in December 2003.

In November 2003 the band decided to go their separate ways. However, they decided that before they did so, they would perform one last short tour across part of Canada as a "Thank You" to their fans. The tour was called "The Watchman's Last Road Trip" and included 9 concerts in 6 Canadian cities and 1 American city.

As an extra special thank you to fans, the band released full soundboard recordings from each concert via download, first from their own site and then via Maple Music. The cost was $10.00 CDN per show. Among fans of the band, this has become known as the Last Road Trip Download Series.

Throughout the tour, the band consisted of original band members Daniel Greaves (Vocals & Harmonica), and Joey Serlin (Guitar) with Ken Tizzard (Bass) who had been with the since their second album, and Ryan Ahoff (Drums) who replaced original drummer Sammy Kohn. Original bassist Pete Loewen joined the band during the encore of their last show in their hometown of Winnipeg on December 20, 2003.

== Tour dates ==
- December 16, 2003 - Calgary, AB - The Palace
- December 17, 2003 - Edmonton, AB - Red's
- December 18, 2003 - Saskatoon, SK - Patricia Hotel
- December 19, 2003 - Winnipeg, MB - The Pyramid Cabaret (formerly The Spectrum)
- December 20, 2003 - Winnipeg, MB - The Pyramid Cabaret (formerly The Spectrum)
- December 26, 2003 - Toronto, ON - Horseshoe Tavern
- December 27, 2003 - Toronto, ON - Horseshoe Tavern
- December 29, 2003 - Ottawa, ON - Capital Ballroom
- December 31, 2003 - Buffalo, NY - The Continental

== Set Lists ==
The band decided to go back to their roots and play a lot of older songs which had not been performed in a while. The noticeable exception was the album Brand New Day which only had the song Incarnate played from it. The album breakdown is as follows:

- McLaren Furnace Room - 7 of 12 songs performed at least once
- In The Trees - 8 of 12 songs performed at least once
- Brand New Day - 1 of 11 songs performed at least once
- Silent Radar - 9 of 12 songs performed at least once
- Slomotion - 6 of 8 songs performed at least once

The band also continued their long tradition of playing cover songs throughout the tour. The following songs were covered in their entirety (with location):

- I Can See Clearly Now by Johnny Nash - Calgary
- Tender Comrade by Billy Bragg - Calgary & Buffalo
- Between the Wars by Billy Bragg - Edmonton, Saskatoon, & Toronto #2
- Sweet Baby James by James Taylor - Winnipeg #1
- Redemption Song by Bob Marley - Winnipeg (#1 & #2), Toronto #2, & Ottawa
- Mad World by Tears for Fears - Winnipeg #1
- Richard Cory by Simon and Garfunkel - Toronto #1
- Creeps Like Me by Lyle Lovett - Ottawa
