= Slomotion =

Studio album by The Watchmen
- Released: October 2001 (Canada); November 6, 2001 (U.S.)
- Recorded: Sound and Vision, Toronto, ON and Hipposonic, Vancouver, BC
- Genre: Rock
- Label: EMI Music Canada
- Producers: The Watchmen, DJ Iain, Snoog, & Rhys Fulber

The Watchmen chronology
Live Radar (1998)	Slomotion (2001)	Last Road Trip Download Series (2004)

Slomotion is the fifth and final studio album by The Watchmen. The album was released as 2-CD set where the second CD was a greatest hits package.

== Background ==
After four albums, Sammy Kohn split from the group to work as Canadian promo rep for the Toronto offices of Boston-based roots label, Rounder Records. Musically, he hooked up with John Hornak and Michael Owen from reaulaudiowavetransfer. The new partnership took off instantly and resulted in a new band, the experimental trio Avenue One.

The loss of their drummer and original member would alter the band's songwriting and sound. With Kohn gone, the various Watchmen hooked up their Macintosh computers with Pro Tools software and began experimenting with samples, backbeats and tape loops to create a collection of electronic tracks shot through with the band's trademark melodies. This change in direction divided fans and critics.

At this time, EMI Music Canada wanted to release a greatest hits package with one or two new songs. The band fought to include all 8 of the new songs they had completed. As a compromise, the new album became a 2-CD set but was priced as a single CD.

Disc One, dubbed Fast Forward, is a set of 8 new songs produced by Rhys Fulber (Front Line Assembly & Delerium) and DJ Iain, and also includes a remix of their song "Stereo" from Silent Radar. The songs feature programmed beats, and synthesizer sounds, a first for the band. Disc Two, dubbed Rewind, includes 9 of the band's best songs, culled from their previous four studio records.

In keeping with the band's embrace of multimedia and the internet which began with Silent Radar, both discs contained multimedia components, including photos, video clips, and technology allowing fans to remix the song “Slomotion”. Both CDs also provided a link to a private website which could only be accessible to those who bought the CD.

== Reception ==
The album's lead single, "Absolutely Anytime", was released on August 20, 2001, and was successful, reaching the top 10 on the BDS Canada Rock chart. The album was released in the first week of October 2001 and the bargain-priced double-CD set sold 7,908 copies in its first week of release. This placed it at No. 6 on the Canadian Albums Chart. This was an improvement over the first week sales of the band's previous album Silent Radar in April 1998 which sold 4,985 copies in its first week. The album was certified Gold in Canada by the Canadian Recording Industry Association on October 16, 2001.

The band made videos for "Slomotion" and "Holiday (Slow It Down)" in 2002, both of which saw good rotation on MuchMusic.

== Tour ==
The band went on an extensive tour to support the new album. Band members Joey Serlin (Guitar, Vocals), Daniel Greaves (Vocals, Harmonica, Piano), and Ken Tizzard (Bass) were joined by Winnipegger Ryan Ahoff on Drums. In addition to playing bass, Tizzard also acted as the group's DJ by working a turntable and other “digital doodads”. He took up the name OBScene to commemorate his new DJ skills.

Throughout the tour, the band continued to use the internet to promote their efforts. For example, the December 20, 2001 concert at the Congress Centre in Ottawa was webcast over the internet.

Following the promotion and tour for Slomotion, the band members went off to separate projects. However, as 2002 became 2003, the band members decided the band had run its course. The decision to fold the band came about not because of musical differences or nasty infighting, but because of a bad case of creative stagnation. Following the tour in support of Slomotion, the band members felt that their enthusiasm was more on the other projects and it was forced for The Watchmen, and it wasn't fair for the band or the fans.

== Track listing ==
CD 1 – Fast Forward

1. Holiday (Slow It Down) (Daniel Greaves)
2. Absolutely Anytime (Joey Serlin)
3. No Longer Mine (Serlin)
4. Together (Music: The Watchmen, Lyrics: Greaves)
5. Slomotion (Serlin)
6. I Like It (Music: The Watchmen, Lyrics: Greaves)
7. Phone Call (Music: Greaves/Ken Tizzard, Lyrics: Greaves)
8. Soft Parade (Music: Serlin, Lyrics: Greaves)
9. Stereo (Remix) (Music: The Watchmen, Lyrics: Greaves)

CD2 – Rewind

1. Cracked (From: McLaren Furnace Room, 1992)
2. Run & Hide (From: McLaren Furnace Room, 1992)
3. Boneyard Tree (From: In The Trees, 1994)
4. All Uncovered (From: In The Trees, 1994)
5. Incarnate (From: Brand New Day, 1996)
6. Zoom (From: Brand New Day, 1996)
7. Shut Up (From: Brand New Day, 1996)
8. Any Day Now (From: Silent Radar, 1998)
9. Brighter Hell (From: Silent Radar, 1998)

Note: For songwriting and production credits for CD 2, see respective albums.

== Album credits ==
=== Personnel ===
- Daniel Greaves – Vocals, Piano
- Joey Serlin – Guitar, Vocals, Keyboards
- Ken Tizzard – Bass, Programming

=== Additional personnel ===
- Sammy Kohn - Drums on CD 2
- Pete Loewen - Bass on Tracks 1 & 2 on CD 2

=== Production (CD 1 – Fast Forward) ===
- Fast Forward mastered by Nick Rawson at the Post Shop
- All Songs Co-Produced by The Watchmen

"Holiday (Slow It Down)", "Together", "I Like It", "Phone Call", and "Soft Parade"

- Produced by DJ Iain and Snoog
- Recorded at Sound and Vision (Toronto, ON)
- Mixed by DJ Iain at Sound and Vision (Toronto, ON)
- “Holiday (Slow It Down)” and “Phone Call": Additional Recording at Music High & Wide, Audio Playground
- “Together”: Additional Recording at Music High & Wide, Signal to Noise
- “Soft Parade”: Additional Recording at Music High & Wide, Signal to Noise, Audio Playground
- “Holiday”: Additional Programming by Snoog and DJ Iain
- “Together”, “I Like It”, “Phone Call”, and “Soft Parade”: Additional Programming by Snoog, DJ Iain, and OBScene

“Absolutely Anytime”, “No Longer Mine”, and “Slomotion”

- Produced by Rhys Fulber
- Mixed & Engineered by Mike Plotnikoff
- Digital Editing by Paul Silveira
- Recorded at Hipposonic (Vancouver, BC)
- Additional Recording at Signal to Noise
- Programming by Rhys Fulber
- Mixed at Hipposonic and The Mix Room (Burbank, CA)
- Mixing Assistants Chris Guy (Hipposonic) and Chuck Bailey (The Mix Room)
- “Absolutely Anytime”: Additional Programming by Joey Serlin and OBScene
- “No Longer Mine”: Additional Programming by Chris Peterson, Jason Filipchuk, Joey Serlin and OBScene
- “Slomotion”: Additional Programming by Chris Peterson, Joey Serlin and OBScene

“Stereo (Remix)”

- Remixed by Rhys Fulber
- Mixed by Mike Plotnikoff
- Programming by Rhys Fulber
- Digital Editing by Greg Collins
- Mixed at The Mix Room (Burbank, CA)
- Recorded by Adam Kasper
- Original version from Silent Radar
