= Daniel Victor =

Canadian musician and producer (born 1979)

- Also known as: Neverending White Lights; Black Ribbons
- Born: September 20, 1979 (age 46); Windsor, Ontario, Canada
- Genres: Rock; pop rock; indie
- Occupations: Songwriter; musician; record producer
- Instruments: Vocals; piano; guitar; drums
- Labels: MapleMusic; Ocean

Daniel Victor (born September 20, 1979) is a Canadian recording artist and producer from Windsor, Ontario, best known for the collaborative music project Neverending White Lights, which features instrumentation performed mostly by Victor, with guest singers providing vocals for most of the songs.

== Early life ==
Victor was born in Canada to an Italian father and Argentinian mother, and raised in southern Ontario. His father was a musician and performer, and exposed him to music from an early age. He began studying the piano at age six, under the direction of nuns at a local conservatory. After five years, he quit piano lessons to play by ear and compose freely. He taught himself a range of instruments and began singing. During his adolescence, he often performed as a percussionist in various local orchestras and jazz groups, and formed several other groups, for which he also acted as producer/engineer in the home studio that his father had built in their basement. Victor worked in the studio producing local bands from the Windsor-Detroit area.

== Neverending White Lights ==
At the age of 19, Victor enrolled at the University of Windsor. During this period, he moved from working in bands to multitracking in the studio, producing early versions of songs that would later appear on his debut album, Act 1: Goodbye Friends of the Heavenly Bodies. Interested by the format of movie soundtracks, compilations, and hip hop collaborations, he sent out compositions to vocalists with whom he wanted to work, hoping to create a fully collaborative record in the indie genre, with what Victor described as "diversity in the voice, but consistency in the song".

=== Act I: Goodbye Friends of the Heavenly Bodies ===
Act I: Goodbye Friends of the Heavenly Bodies

Studio album by Neverending White Lights
- Released: September 27, 2005
- Length: 78:59
- Label: Ocean Records Canada / Maple Music Nationwide
- Producer: Daniel Victor

Neverending White Lights chronology
Act I: Goodbye Friends of the Heavenly Bodies (2005)	Act II: The Blood and the Life Eternal (2007)

After graduating, Victor devoted himself full-time to the project, named Neverending White Lights, intended as a metaphor for human energy. The record was conceived as a 16-song concept album, entitled Act I: Goodbye Friends of the Heavenly Bodies, the first episode in a story that would continue over many albums, with the albums as "Acts", the songs as "Scenes", and the various singers as "Actors".

Victor's first collaboration for this album was called "On Fire", co-written with Switchfoot frontman Jon Foreman. The song was not included on Act I, but appeared on Switchfoot's fourth studio album, The Beautiful Letdown. For other collaborations on the first album, Victor worked with vocalists from bands including 311, Ours, Hum, Finger Eleven, Shudder to Think, the Velvet Teen, Our Lady Peace, Age of Electric, the Watchmen, the Black Maria, Creeper Lagoon, Starflyer 59, City and Colour, Deckard, Supergarage, Evelynn, and Cirrus. Victor wrote most of the music, insisted on performing all the instrumentation himself, and also completed all the producing and mixing stages.

Victor finished the album in September 2005. There were several unreleased tracks written and recorded for Act I, including the songs "John Dies at 56" (featuring Mogwai), "Throwing Chairs" (featuring Switchfoot), "Shipbuilding" (featuring Unbelievable Truth), and "This Is My Fate" (featuring City and Colour). On September 27, 2005, the album was released independently through Victor's own label, Ocean Records Canada. The first single from the album was "The Grace", featuring Canadian singer Dallas Green. It was certified Gold and became the sixth most-played song on Canadian Rock Radio in 2006. The music video, featuring Emm Gryner, reached #1 on Much Music and modern rock radio, and Victor subsequently went on tour as a support act with Canadian band Our Lady Peace. The album sold just under 40,000 copies in Canada and received a number of awards and nominations, including a Juno nomination for Best New Artist.

:"I: The Hour Arrives"
No.	Title	Length
1.	"From What I Once Was (vocals by Daniel Victor)"	5:55
2.	"Angels & Saints (vocals by Chris Gordon of Deckard)"	3:10
3.	"Age of Consent (vocals by Nick Hexum of 311)"	4:08
4.	"Ending of a Story (vocals by Chris Gray of the Black Maria)"	3:31
5.	"Return Our Lives (vocals by Judah Nagler of the Velvet Teen)"	6:00

:"II: My Angel, My Queen, My Death, My Treasure"
No.	Title	Length
6.	"I Hope Your Heart Runs Empty (vocals by Scott Anderson of Finger Eleven)"	6:23
7.	"A Littlepiece (vocals by Marco DeFelice of Supergarage"	4:45
8.	"This Longing (vocals by Daniel Greaves of The Watchmen & Doctor)"	5:43
9.	"Of All the Things You've Done Wrong (vocals by Nathan Larson & Jason Martin of Shudder to Think & Starflyer 59)"	3:06
10.	"Tired of Saving Souls (vocals by John Campsey of Sleepway)"	5:20
11.	"How Could I Survive (vocals by Sharky Laguana of Creeper Lagoon)"	2:58
12.	"The Grace (vocals by Dallas Green of Alexisonfire & City and Colour)"	5:19

:"III: A Pale Nation Sleeps in Misery"
No.	Title	Length
13.	"First Days of Spring (vocals by Matt Talbot of Hum & Centaur"	5:50
14.	"Liar (vocals by Raine Maida of Our Lady Peace"	3:45
15.	"Life Is a Dead Scene (vocals by Todd Kerns of Age of Electric"	4:58
16.	"Our Final Hymn (vocals by Jimmy Gnecco of Ours"	8:08

=== Act II: The Blood and the Life Eternal ===
Act II: The Blood and the Life Eternal

Studio album by Neverending White Lights
- Released: October 30, 2007
- Length: 70:29

Neverending White Lights chronology
Act I: Goodbye Friends of the Heavenly Bodies (2005)	Act II: The Blood and the Life Eternal (2007)	Act III: Love Will Ruin (2011)

Professional ratings
Review scores
Source	Rating
Melodic.net	4.5/5 Classic Album

Victor took about a year to write and record his second album, entitled Act II: The Blood and the Life Eternal, recorded in his basement studio in 2006/2007 and released on October 30, 2007. The album featured members of groups including Aqualung, The Raveonettes, Mobile, Catherine Wheel, Auf der Maur, Hawksley Workman, Magneta Lane, Mellowdrone, and Ours. The first single, "Always", was the first to feature lead vocals from Victor himself, and peaked at #18 on the Canadian Rock Chart. This was followed by "The World Is Darker", featuring Melissa Auf der Maur, and then the driving rock song "Where We Are", featuring Rob Dickinson of the UK band Catherine Wheel.

In 2008, Victor took time off and decided not to tour the album, instead spending time with friends and family. During this period, he produced and recorded an album as part of a side-project, Black Ribbons, a 12-song electro-pop album produced and recorded in a few months, with every song written on the bass guitar.

No.	Title	Length
1.	"Theme from the Blood and the Life Eternal"	3:22
2.	"Dove Coloured Sky (vocals by Jimmy Gnecco of Ours)"	4:54
3.	"The Living (vocals by Coury Palermo of Lynden)"	4:46
4.	"The World Is Darker (vocals by Melissa Auf der Maur of Hole; Smashing Pumpkins)"	3:40
5.	"My Life Without Me (vocals by Mat Joly of Mobile)"	4:57
6.	"Miss World (vocals by Daniel Victor)"	3:06
7.	"The Warning (vocals by Jonathan Bates of Mellowdrone)"	4:51
8.	"Always (vocals by Daniel Victor)"	4:04
9.	"Where We Are (vocals by Rob Dickinson of Catherine Wheel)"	3:34
10.	"Black Is the Colour of My True Love's Heart (vocals by Lexi Valentine of Magneta Lane)"	5:56
11.	"Bleeds to an End (vocals by Daniel Victor)"	4:47
12.	"Nothing I Can Save (vocals by Daniel Victor)"	4:16
13.	"Distance (vocals by Matt Hales of Aqualung)"	4:53
14.	"Last of the Great Lovers (vocals by Sune Rose Wagner of the Raveonettes)"	5:34
15.	"Warding Off the Spirits (vocals by Ryan Corrigan)"	7:49

=== Act III: Love Will Ruin ===
Act III: Love Will Ruin

Studio album by Neverending White Lights
- Released: November 18, 2011
- Length: 49:00
- Label: Ocean Records
- Producer: Daniel Victor

Neverending White Lights chronology
Act II: The Blood and the Life Eternal (2007)	Act III: Love Will Ruin (2011)	Act IV: Love Will Ruin (TBA)

Between 2007 and 2011, Victor worked on his third album, Act 3: Love Will Ruin. Writing and production for this album progressed slowly and was affected by various setbacks. Victor eventually wrote and recorded nearly seventy songs, but when he had a 'finished' copy in his hands after several years, decided it was unworthy of release, and returned to the studio to start from scratch.

On September 21, 2010, Victor leaked a song from the album, entitled "The Lonely War", featuring Evan Konrad of Bed of Stars. He also announced that due to difficulties with a rupture in his vocal cords, the official release date of the album was delayed from 2009 to late 2011. In spring 2011, the first single/video from Act 3 was released, entitled "Falling Apart" (featuring Bed of Stars). In October, the single "Ghost Ship" (featuring Hot Hot Heat) was released, peaking at #9 for three weeks on ALT Rock in Canada. Act 3 was finally released in North America, and digitally in the UK and Australia, on November 18, 2011. It also featured guest performances by Hot Hot Heat, Bed of Stars, and Pilot Speed. The album features more vocals from Victor himself, and is generally more uptempo and rock-sounding than his previous releases.

No.	Title	Length
1.	"Theme from Love Will Ruin"	3:08
2.	"Falling Apart feat. Bed of Stars"	4:03
3.	"Starlight feat. Pilot Speed"	3:45
4.	"Say Hi for Me"	3:40
5.	"The Game Needed Me"	5:10
6.	"Goodbye"	4:03
7.	"The Lonely War"	3:55
8.	"Ghost Ship feat. Hot Hot Heat"	3:42
9.	"The Greatest One"	5:21
10.	"The Waltz"	3:50
11.	"The Hereafter feat. Bed of Stars"	8:34

=== Act IV ===
In 2018, Victor stated he was working on the fourth Neverending White Lights studio album, following a nearly ten-year break due to mental health issues. Since then, there has been no announcement about when or if new material will be released.

== Other work ==
Victor has produced and recorded albums for other artists, including the City and Colour album Sometimes, and keyboard parts on the Ours album Mercy.

In 2010, he contributed guest vocals to the single "This Time" on the JDiggz Mixtape The Xperiment. The video reached #1 on the Much Music Countdown and garnered four video nominations, winning the Much Music Video Award for Best Independent Video of the Year (2011).

In 2012, Victor parted ways with his record label MapleMusic Recordings to focus on his own label. On October 30, 2012, he released an album under the name Black Ribbons, entitled Neuromancer. The 12-song project was written and recorded in 2008 and uses heavy synth-pop and noir 1980s influences. Victor also produced and recorded the debut album from Vancouver artist Bed of Stars, released on Victor's Ocean Records label on June 11, 2013.

In November 2012, Victor collaborated with Juno-nominated Canadian rapper D-Sisive on the track "Don't Turn the Lights Out". It peaked at #20 on Much Music's Countdown (Canada) in 2013.

== Discography ==
=== Neverending White Lights ===
Albums

- Act 1: Goodbye Friends of the Heavenly Bodies (2005)
- Act 2: The Blood and the Life Eternal (2007)
- Act 3: Love Will Ruin (2011)

EPs

- The World Is Darker (2008)

Singles

Year	Song	Chart peak		Album
Year	Song	CAN Alt	CAN Rock	Album
2005	"The Grace" (featuring Dallas Green)	3	1	Act 1: Goodbye Friends of the Heavenly Bodies
2006	"Angels & Saints" (featuring Chris Gordon)	—	—	Act 1: Goodbye Friends of the Heavenly Bodies
2006	"Age of Consent" (featuring Nick Hexum)	39	—	Act 1: Goodbye Friends of the Heavenly Bodies
2007	"Always" (featuring Daniel Victor)	29	18	Act 2: The Blood and the Life Eternal
2008	"The World Is Darker" (featuring Melissa Auf der Maur)	—	—	Act 2: The Blood and the Life Eternal
2008	"Where We Are" (featuring Rob Dickinson)	—	—	Act 2: The Blood and the Life Eternal
2011	"Falling Apart" (featuring Bed of Stars)	34	—	Act 3: Love Will Ruin
2011	"Ghost Ship" (featuring Hot Hot Heat)	9	29	Act 3: Love Will Ruin
"—" denotes a release that did not chart.

Featured in:

- 2011: "This Time" JDiggz feat. Neverending White Lights # on 1 Much Music Video Chart / MMVA Winner for Best Independent Video 2011
- 2012: "Don't Turn the Lights Out" D-Sisive feat. Neverending White Lights

=== Black Ribbons ===
- Neuromancer (2012)

== Awards and nominations ==
Wins

- Favourite Single of the Year – Indie Music Awards 2006
- Number 1 Song Award – SOCAN 2006
- Favourite Group of the Year – Indie Music Awards 2007
- Best New Group of the Year – Radio Music Awards 2007
- Success Story of the Year Award – EBA Entertainment 2009
- Best Independent Video of the Year – MMVAs 2011
- Number 1 Song Award – SOCAN 2011
- Artist of the Year – Biz X Awards

Nominations

- Best Independent Video – MMVAs 2006
- Favourite New Artist – Casby Music Awards 2006
- Favourite New Single – Casby Music Awards 2006
- Favourite New Release – Casby Music Awards 2006
- New Artist of the Year – JUNO Awards 2007
- Best Independent Video – MMVAs 2008
- Favourite New Single – Casby Music Awards 2008
- Favourite New Release – Casby Music Awards 2008
- Best Cinematography – MMVAs 2011
- Best Director – MMVAs 2011
- Favourite Video of the Year – Indie Music Awards 2012
- Collaboration of the Year – Indie Music Awards 2013
