= Music of Manitoba =

Canadian music

Manitoba, Canada has produced lots of music, mostly since the early 1960s.

The University of Manitoba and Brandon University both include schools of music. Brandon University's music school and its Queen Elizabeth II Music Building are hubs for music in southwestern Manitoba.

== Traditional music ==
Manitoba is a center for the old-time fiddling of the Métis people. The tune "Whiskey Before Breakfast" was popularized there by the Métis fiddler Andy DeJarlis (1914–1975), who was from the Red River region.

Bob Nolan was a cowboy singer famous for writing Tumbling Tumbleweeds, while Winnipeg-born Oscar Brand was an important figure in folk music.

In the early 1990s Susan Aglukark, born in Churchill, achieved national country music and adult contemporary chart success with songs incorporating Inuit folk music traditions.

== Popular music ==
=== 1960s – mid-1970s ===
The Canadian 1960s supergroup "Chad Allen and the Expressions" (later known as The Guess Who) became the first rock musicians to be recognized outside Canada. Their 1965 hit "Shakin' All Over" gave them instant success in Canada and Great Britain. The band was renamed the Guess Who in 1966, and with Chad Allen gone and new keyboardist Burton Cummings on vocals, they began to realize their full potential as a rock band. Their hits "American Woman", "No Time", "Clap for the Wolfman", "These Eyes", and "No Sugar Tonight/New Mother Nature" made them one of the most successful rock bands to ever come from Canada. A version of the band featuring original dummer Garry Peterson continues to perform as the Guess Who, but the band as most fans know it broke up in 1975.

Neil Young was also a product of the 1960s Winnipeg music scene, and has deep family roots in Western Manitoba. Neil played in community clubs in Winnipeg with his band, the Squires, during the mid-1960s. Those days were recounted in the song "Prairie Town", recorded in 1992 with Randy Bachman. Early in Neil's career he played with Stephen Stills in the band Buffalo Springfield, and again with Crosby, Stills, Nash & Young. However, Neil Young is best known as a solo artist, producing albums like Harvest and a string of hits. As of 2022, his career has spanned more than five decades. He is referred to by some as the Godfather of Grunge, having inspired grunge pioneers like Nirvana’s Kurt Cobain and Pearl Jam’s Eddie Vedder. Some regard him as one of the most influential Canadian musicians of all time.

Former Guess Who guitarist, Randy Bachman, started a band called Brave Belt not long after he left the Guess Who. Brave Belt was later renamed to Bachman–Turner Overdrive (BTO for short). Bachman–Turner Overdrive became popular with such hits as "Takin' Care of Business", the Billboard Hot 100 #1 hit "You Ain't Seen Nothin' Yet" from 1974, and "Let it Ride". Burton Cummings, who had been the lead singer of the Guess Who, also had a successful solo career with softer hits including "Stand Tall", "Scared", and "Break it to Them Gently". In spite of the breakup of the Guess Who, several of Cummings’ solo songs featured Bachman on guitar. Bachman and Cummings continue to perform together on occasion under the banner Bachman-Cummings.

Between 1970 and 1974, four different Winnipeg artists had #1 hits on the Billboard Hot 100, including the aforementioned The Guess Who, Bachman Turner Overdrive, Neil Young, and Terry Jacks with 1974's "Seasons in the Sun."

=== Mid 1970s – mid-1990s ===
Tom Cochrane, a rocker originally from the town of Lynn Lake in Northern Manitoba, rose to fame with his band Red Rider, producing such hits as "Lunatic Fringe", "Boy Inside the Man" and "Big League". As a solo artist Cochrane recorded five albums, producing the hit "Life Is a Highway", a song later covered by country band Rascal Flatts, among others.

The late 1970s and early-to-mid 1980s brought a new arena rock vibe to the local music scene, featuring made-in-Manitoba rockers Harlequin, and the Chris Burke-Gaffney-lead bands The Pumps, Orphan and later the Deadbeat Honeymooners. Harlequin was arguably the most popular band to come out of Manitoba in the early 1980s, producing several radio-friendly hits including "Sweet Things in Life", "Innocence", and "Superstitious Feeling". Winnipeg was also a second home and regular stop for Regina-based Streetheart — a band with several linkages to Winnipeg including original member Ken “Spider” Sinnaeve.

In the late 1980s, an indie folk/pop band from Winnipeg called Crash Test Dummies was formed featuring singers Brad Roberts and Ellen Reid. In 1991, Crash Test Dummies had success in Canada with their first album The Ghosts that Haunt Me, which included the single “Superman's Song”. They found mainstream success in the US, UK and Australia with their second album, featuring the folk rock Billboard Modern Rock Tracks #1 single in 1994 "Mmm Mmm Mmm Mmm", as well as their third album and the single "The Ballad of Peter Pumpkinhead" which was featured in the movie Dumb & Dumber.

The Watchmen formed in Winnipeg in 1988, releasing their first album, McLaren Furnace Room in 1992. It was named for the space in Winnipeg's McLaren Hotel, where the band would rehearse. The Watchmen released seven albums and are known for Daniel Greaves’ unique vocals and songs like "Boneyard Tree", "Incarnate" and "Stereo", among others.

Originally formed in Seattle, Econoline Crush is a band based in Vancouver, led by singer Trevor Hurst, who was born and raised in Virden, Manitoba. Econoline Crush had several hit songs in Canada, including "You Don't Know What It's Like", "Sparkle and Shine", and "All That You Are".

The New Meanies, originally called the Blue Meanies, are a Canadian four-piece rock band from Winnipeg. Formed around 1990 by high school friends Damon Mitchell (lead vocals, guitar, harmonica), Jeff Hondubura (guitar, vocals), Sky Onosson (bass, vocals, keyboards) and Jason Kane (drums, percussion) started playing blues-influenced rock. After releasing two independent albums, Experience is Lost (independently released on cassette only) and The Blue Meanies, they toured extensively throughout Western Canada in the early 1990s. The band signed with Virgin Records in 1996. The band changed its name to the New Meanies due to the existence of another Blue Meanies based in Chicago, and recorded a new album Three Seeds in the Los Angeles area with producer Howard Benson. The album was released in 1998, and the single "Letting Time Pass" achieved airplay on radio and television, charting at No. 14 on RPM Magazine's Canadian rock/alternative chart. In 1999, the band performed in Toronto with Danko Jones and Tricky Woo. In 2000, the band went indie again and released a new album, Highways, in 2001.

=== Recent rock and pop music ===
Born in India, and currently living in Vancouver, Bif Naked spent her teen and young adult years in Winnipeg. Several of her songs have received airplay over the years, including “Spaceman”, “I Love Myself Today”, and “Tango Shoes”. Bif Naked continued recording while she battled breast cancer, releasing her album The Promise in 2009.

Juno Award-winning artist Chantal Kreviazuk released her first album in 1997 and recorded several hits, but is perhaps most successful as a songwriter. Kreviazuk has co-written songs for and with many other artists including Avril Lavigne, Gwen Stefani, Kelly Clarkson, and her husband Raine Maida of Our Lady Peace fame.

Brent Fitz a multi-instrumentalist born in Winnipeg, currently resides in Las Vegas and has recorded and toured with a vast array of Canadian and International artists including Guns N' Roses guitarist Slash, Alice Cooper, Mötley Crüe vocalist Vince Neil, Theory Of A Deadman, Streetheart, Harlequin and The Guess Who.

Hard Rock band Jet Set Satellite secured a record deal and burst on to the Canadian music scene in 2000 with two hits: "Best Way to Die" and "Baby, Cool Your Jets". They left their label after only one album but continue to record as an indie band. Also in 2000, dance-pop duo McMaster & James made the leap from playing gigs at the Bank Cabaret in downtown Winnipeg to pop music fame with their one and only self-titled album.

Remy Shand also enjoyed a successful music career. His 2002 debut album, The Way I Feel, earned him a Juno Award for Best R&B/Soul Recording, and four Grammy nominations. In the spring of 2013, Shand released a cover of Marvin Gaye's "Where Are We Going?" to YouTube, and added "Springtime" to his Bandcamp site. The song is dedicated to his late mother.

Propagandhi is a punk rock band from Winnipeg (originally from Portage la Prairie, Manitoba) that incorporates politics and ethics in its music and performances. Though not heavily played on the radio, the band parlayed a renewed interest in punk music in the late 1990s into a successful touring career, and won the 2006 ECHO songwriting award for their song "A Speculative Fiction".

Juno-nominated indie-rockers The Weakerthans formed in 1997. Critical recognition soon followed, as did a local fan base, although they are best known to many for their tongue-in-cheek salute to their home town “One Great City!”, which features the line “I hate Winnipeg”.

Other Manitoba artists and bands in the rock and pop genres include The Waking Eyes, Royal Canoe, Imaginary Cities, and Chic Gamine.

== Other genres ==
Manitoba also has made significant contributions in other areas of music besides pop. There is a choral tradition that goes back to the beginnings of the 20th century. Manitoba has an opera tradition, a vaudeville tradition and a classical music tradition as well. Manitoba's multi-cultural make up is influenced by the cultures of the world.

The late jazz legend Lenny Breau, also a Winnipegger, had a profound impact on the music of Randy Bachman. He is a world-renowned jazz guitarist known for his rapid finger picking style and ability to sound like three guitars at once. Jazz guitarist Ed Bickert was also born in Manitoba.

The country band Doc Walker is also popular in Manitoba's country music scene, as well as Canada's country music scene. Formed in Portage la Prairie in 1996, the band has gone on to produce an expansive discography which features numerous singles and albums. Popular songs by Doc Walker include Do It Right, Rocket Girl, and Beautiful Life. As of 2022, country musician William Prince has been popular as well.

Additionally, electronic musician Aaron Funk, also known as Venetian Snares, is from and based out of Winnipeg, Manitoba. Venetian Snares has been creating computer-based electronic music since the middle of the 1990s and is a pioneer of the breakcore genre. In 2016, he released an album entirely made with modular analog synths. He released a collaborative album with celebrated Canadian producer/musician Daniel Lanois in 2018.

== See also ==
- List of bands from Canada
