= James Hall (singer) =

American rock singer and guitarist (born 1968)

- Born: James Vincent Hall; January 2, 1968 (age 57); Harris County, Texas, United States
- Genres: Rock
- Occupation: Musician
- Instrument(s): Vocals, guitar
- Labels: RCA/Silvertone, Daemon Records
- Website: James Hall.com

James Vincent Hall (born January 2, 1968, in Harris County, Texas, United States) is an American rock singer and guitarist, best known for his gothic-style lyrics, distinctive voice, avant-garde performances and eclectic compositions.

== Early career – Mary My Hope and solo ==
Before launching his solo career in 1990, James Hall was the singer for Atlanta band, Mary My Hope, which released one album entitled Museum in 1989, and one EP, 1990's Suicide Kings, both on RCA/Silvertone. An expanded version of Suicide Kings appeared at the same time, called Monster Is Bigger Than The Man. This contained, in addition to the unreleased material and Museum album cuts, two live tracks recorded at the Princess Charlotte in Leicester, England. In 1993, Hall's My Love, Sex, and Spirit was put out by Daemon Records, Indigo Girl Amy Ray's co-op effort. Three singles were released from My Love, Sex, and Spirit, each containing non-album tracks. Subsequently, he signed to Geffen Records, and in 1996 his album, Pleasure Club, was released. In 1994, he contributed a trumpet part to the songs "Fugitive" and "Touch Me Fall", from the Indigo Girls' album, Swamp Ophelia.

== Pleasure Club ==
In 2002, Hall appeared with a new band named Pleasure Club. This band featured Hall on vocals and guitar, Michael Jerome on drums, Grant Curry on bass, and Marc Hutner also on guitar. They released three albums, Here Comes The Trick, The Fugitive Kind and the last Scatter Rose (2020). Here Comes The Trick was later re-released as a double with a live album entitled Live: Out of the Pulpit accompanying it. Pleasure Club have since disbanded, and Hall has returned to his solo work.

== The Futura Bold ==
After the disbanding of Pleasure Club and the flood waters of Hurricane Katrina receded, Hall was in Atlanta, Georgia. Multi-instrumentalists Chris Piskun and Bruce Butkovich joined James during what was to be his third solo record, yet ultimately morphed into a new entity christened, The Futura Bold. The Futura Bold released a CD called "The Futura Bold" on March 23, 2010 featuring Jimmy Gnecco of the band Ours on background vocals on " Consenting Adults", "Evil Twin" and "Good Times".

== Other projects ==
In 1997, James toured with Brad, playing guitar and keyboards in support of their Interiors album.

Hall has formed a working relationship with singer Jimmy Gnecco of the band Ours, and is featured on the third Ours album, Mercy (Dancing for the Death of an Imaginary Enemy).

He also is the lead singer of the Aristocrats, a recent project started by Hall, Darren Dodd, and Dropsonic's Dan Dixon and Dave Chase.

Currently, James Hall performs with his touring band called "the Ladies of...".
