= Live Radar =

Live album by The Watchmen
- Released: March 31, 1998
- Recorded: Horseshoe Tavern, Toronto, ON
- Genre: Rock
- Length: 20:15
- Label: EMI Music Canada

The Watchmen chronology
Silent Radar (1998)	Live Radar (1998)	Slomotion (2001)

Live Radar is a live EP by The Watchmen.

Following the Canadian release of their fourth studio album, Silent Radar on March 31, 1998, the official album release party came as a live show by the band which was broadcast over the Internet on Thursday April 2, 1998. The webcast was a live show from the Horseshoe Tavern in Toronto.

This concert was recorded and four songs were offered to those who purchased the Silent Radar CD. Included with the initial release of the CD was a white card which contained "CD Active" Instructions to the album's secret website. Attached to this card was a coupon which could be mailed back to the band and the sender would receive a free live EP in the mail called Live Radar. Only those who sent back the card received the bonus CD.

The cardboard sleeve that houses the CD is marked "From Us To You...".

== Track listing ==
1. "Say Something" (live) - 5:01
2. "Silent Radar" (live) - 4:10
3. "Brighter Hell" (live) - 6:25
4. "Stereo" (live) - 4:37

All songs written by The Watchmen, Lyrics by Joey Serlin/Daniel Greaves.

== Album credits ==
=== Personnel ===
- Sammy Kohn - Drums, Percussion, Vocals
- Ken Tizzard - Bass, Vocals
- Daniel Greaves - Lead Vocals, Piano, Harmonica
- Joey Serlin - Guitars, Vocals

=== Production ===
- Recorded live at the Horseshoe Tavern, Toronto, ON, April 2, 1998
- Recorded by Live Wire Remote Recorders
- Mixed and Engineered by Doug McClement
- Live Sound by Neil Cameron
