= Jimmy Gnecco =

American musician (born 1973)

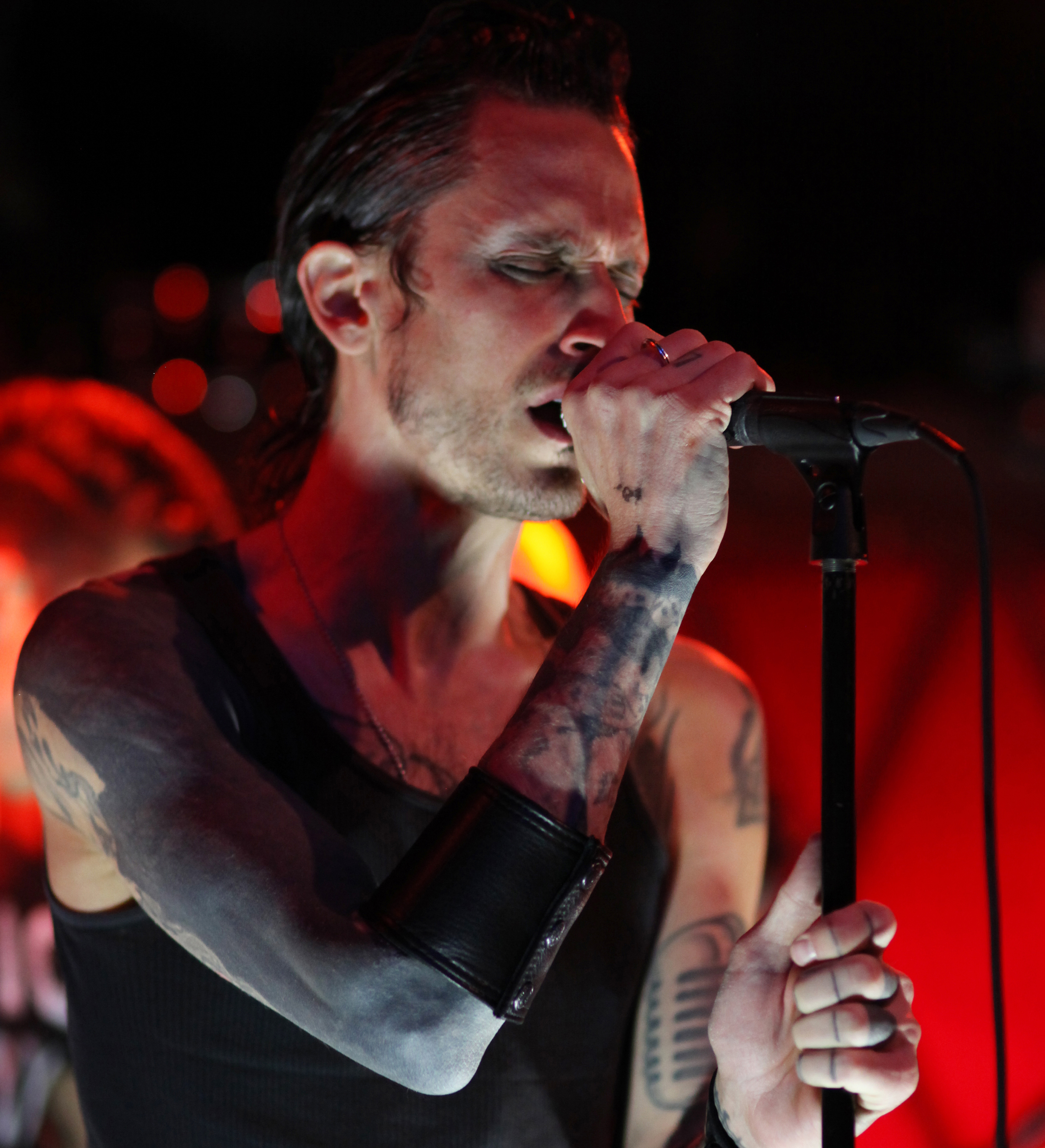
- Gnecco in November 2014.

Background information
- Born: James Francis Gnecco; September 30, 1973 (age 52); Teaneck, New Jersey
- Genres: Experimental rock, acoustic
- Occupation: Musician
- Years active: 1992–present
- Label: unsigned
- Website: jimmygnecco.com

James Francis Gnecco III (born September 30, 1973) is an American singer, songwriter and multi instrumentalist who makes music both under his name and the moniker Ours. Gnecco is known for his multi-octave vocal range and singing style, often described as 'dramatic and emotional'.

== Career ==
Gnecco began making music in 1988. He would play under the names Lost Child and Harmony Bandits before Ours formed officially in 1992. Gnecco's first album, Sour (1994), was a demo compilation with which he was dissatisfied. In 2005 he said, "In 1994, I was only 20 years old, and labels with offering record deals to me, but I knew I was too young, that's not where I was going yet. So, I made one demo record with that Ours line-up and then left it; I didn't want to be known as the ex-singer from those Sour recordings. The band on Sour is not Ours- we were just a bunch of young kids, just messing around. I wasn't allowed to be insane, like I wanted, and I had no patience, and wondered why we felt we had to put it out."

In 1997, he signed to DreamWorks Records and released two records under the label before its disbandment. Ours released their fourth record 'Ballet the Boxer I' on their own label Cage Recording Co. The band toured with acts such as The Cult, A-Ha, Powderfinger, The Wallflowers, Marilyn Manson, Blue October and Filter.

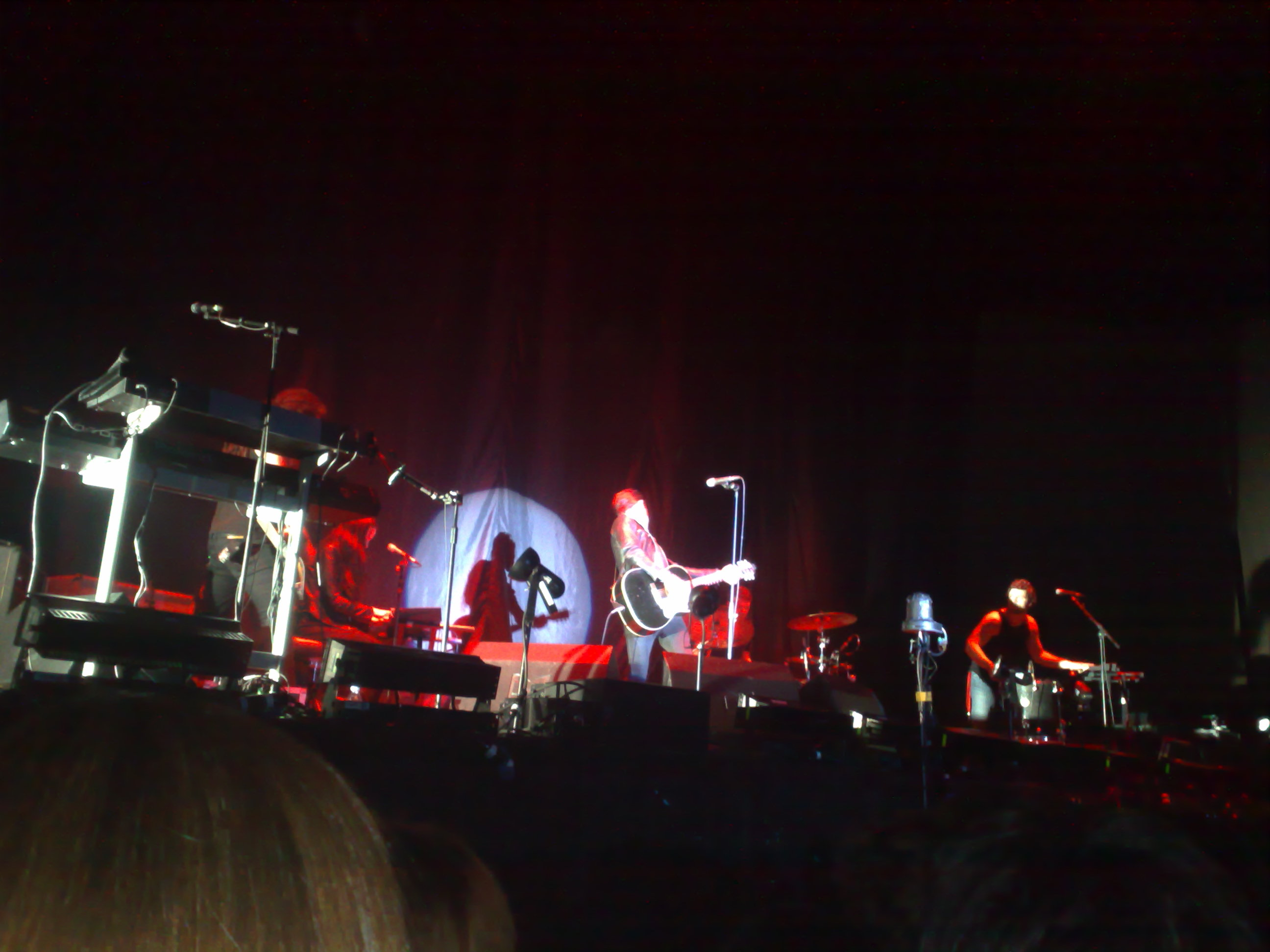
Jimmy Gnecco as a supporting act in a-ha's concert in Palacio Vistalegre in Madrid (Spain) on October 14, 2010.

Gnecco also contributed on the track "Our Final Hymn" from Neverending White Lights' debut album, Act 1: Goodbye Friends of the Heavenly Bodies and also the track "Dove Coloured Sky" from their second album Act 2: The Blood and the Life Eternal.

In 2004 Gnecco and Brian May of the band Queen recorded "Someone to Die For", a duet for the Spider-Man 2 soundtrack. The song is written by Alain Johannes and Natasha Shneider of Eleven in collaboration with Chris Cornell.

In 2006 Gnecco sang a cover of Big Country's "Big Country" for a Kohl's television commercial.

Gnecco released his debut solo album, entitled The Heart, on July 20, 2010, via indie label Bright Antenna.

Gnecco toured with Norwegian band A-ha as a supporting act of the band during the concerts of October and November 2010 of A-ha's farewell tour Ending on a High Note.

In 2011 he collaborated with A-ha's Paul Waaktaar-Savoy in a new band called Weathervane.

In 2013, Gnecco contributed vocals to two tracks for the game Metal Gear Rising: Revengeance, "Collective Consciousness" and "It Has To Be This Way".

In 2022, Gnecco appeared on Stone Temple Pilots's bassist Robert DeLeo's single Love is Not Made Of Gold.

== Discography ==
Ours have released five official albums to date: Ours (2021), New Age Heroine II (2018), Ballet the Boxer 1 (2013), Mercy (Dancing for the Death of an Imaginary Enemy) (2008), Precious' (2002), and their label debut Distorted Lullabies (2001). They have also released an EP titled Media Age (2020).
