= Santiago (band) =

Background information
- Origin: Santa Rosa, California, United States
- Genres: Indie rock, punk rock
- Years active: 2002–present
- Label: Pandacide Record Co.
- Members: Gabe Meline; Josh Drake; Tony Moshenelli
- Website: http://www.deathbysantiago.com

Santiago is an American indie/punk band from Santa Rosa, California, United States, that formed in 2002 and has released three full-length albums. Though generally more sophisticated musically, the band claims a staunch punk rock aesthetic to their approach.

== Biography ==
Santiago was formed in 2002 by singer/guitarist Gabe Meline after leaving The Mr. T Experience (he had previously played in Tilt, Ground Round and Los Blockheads). The band quickly recorded the self-released debut Entertainment For Man And Horse, imploding shortly thereafter as lineup changes forced what would be a temporary hiatus.

In 2004, the band was resuscitated by Josh Drake, drummer and owner of Pandacide Records, who had released albums by The Velvet Teen and The New Trust. With bassist Kyle Lindauer, the trio wrote and recorded 2006's Rosenberg's After Dark, an album dedicated entirely to the band's hometown of Santa Rosa, California. Named for the long-standing department store that once towered over the city's downtown, the album became a compelling snapshot of the typical American small town-turned-suburb with a fiery resistance to the impending loss of its own culture.

In late 2006, Kyle Lindauer suffered ankle injuries and left the band, to be replaced by bassist Tony Moshenelli. "The Blue Line" EP followed in 2008, a one-sided, silkscreened 12" that found the band joined by Lindsay Gray on cello. "The Blue Line" was available on vinyl only.

Santiago's third album, The Illusion of Being Together was released on LP, CD and cassette by Pandacide Records in 2010. Its cover design, lyric insert and packaging mimic the classic Folkways Records style. For the vinyl release, the band recycled 300 old record jackets of soft rock and easy listening artists by painting them black and individually gluing a wrap-around, paste-on slick to each copy.

== Special projects ==
In 2006, Santiago rehearsed and performed the Built to Spill album Perfect from Now On in its entirety with former member Nick Jackson.

In 2007, the band helped organize a memorial tribute, to Logan Whitehurst at the Phoenix Theater, rehearsing and collaborating with Whitehurst's many fans to perform over twenty of Whitehurst's songs. The first 50 copies of each vinyl pressing by Santiago feature individually designed handmade covers, by members and friends of the band and usually sell out quickly.

== Discography ==
=== CDs and LPs ===
- Entertainment For Man And Horse (City Sound Inertia, 2003)
- Rosenberg's After Dark (Pandacide Record Co., 2006)
- The Illusion of Being Together (Pandacide Record Co., 2010)

=== EPs ===
- The Long Dark Hours (City Sound Inertia, 2004)
- The Blue Line (Pandacide Record Co., 2008)
