= Silent Radar =

Studio album by The Watchmen
- Released: March 31, 1998
- Recorded: 1997
- Studio: Studio Litho (Seattle, Washington)
- Genre: Rock
- Length: 57:50
- Label: EMI Music Canada/Capitol
- Producer: Adam Kasper

The Watchmen chronology
Brand New Day (1996)	Silent Radar (1998)	Live Radar (1998)

Professional ratings
Review scores
Source	Rating
Allmusic	4/5 stars

Silent Radar is the fourth studio album by The Watchmen. The album contained numerous hits including "Stereo", "Any Day Now", and "Say Something". Videos for "Stereo" and "Any Day Now" saw heavy play on MuchMusic in 1998, but by the time the video for "Brighter Hell" was released in 1999, the momentum had slowed and this video was seen infrequently.

The album was certified Gold in Canada by the Canadian Recording Industry Association on July 30, 1998.

== Background ==
While their previous three albums were released by MCA Records, this was the first release from the band by EMI Music Canada. In 1995, Seagram Company Ltd. acquired 80% of MCA and the following year the new owners dropped the MCA name; the company became Universal Studios, Inc. and its music division, MCA Music Entertainment Group, was renamed Universal Music Group.

The biggest change on the CD was the band's embrace of the internet. The CD included a CD-activated key to access multi-media material in a secret area of the band's website. The CD activated website was the first use of this technology for a major-label band.

This gave the band three websites: their old website done in a traditional fashion, a new site dedicated to their new record Silent Radar, and a main site which included WAG, the band's official "magazine."

At the time, their webzine WAG set the band apart from their contemporaries. The webzine was filled with writing from the various band members and included digital photos taken by the band, tour diaries, feature articles, and a summary of the band's reviews of concerts, books, records and gear. The goal of the band in this internet endeavor was to allow them to show their audience who they were when not on stage.

The release of the album was also unique for its time. They unveiled the album one piece at a time over the internet. Starting Thursday March 5, 1998, a piece of the artwork from the new album was posted on a special website, along with a snippet of one song from the album. Between March 5, 1998 and March 27, 1998, a new piece and a new song was posted every other day until the puzzle was descrambled, and fans had seen and heard bits of the whole track listing.

The first song to be put up on the site was the first single "Stereo", and the snippets were only up for a two-day period before it was replaced by the next song.

Following the Canadian release on March 31, 1998, the official album release party came as a live show by the band which was broadcast over the Internet and radio on April 2, 1998. The webcast was a live show from Lee's Palace in Toronto.

Included with the initial release of the CD was a white card which contained "CD Active" Instructions to the album's secret website. Attached to this card was a coupon which could be mailed back to the band and the sender would receive a free live EP in the mail called Live Radar. This EP included four songs from the release show of Silent Radar, which was originally broadcast over radio. Only those who sent back the card received the bonus CD.

The album provided the band with their third and final Juno nomination as they were nominated for Best Rock Album at the 1999 Juno Awards. As was the case with their previous two Juno nominations, the band lost the award to The Tragically Hip. (The band's next studio record, Slomotion, was not eligible for a Juno nomination as it contained a "greatest hits" bonus disc and thus did not meet the Juno requirement that a majority of the material on the album be previously unreleased.)

On April 14th, 2023, the band released a special reissue, dubbed Silent Radar Super Deluxe. The album was made available only over digital download and streaming services, and contained the original Silent Radar album in its entirety, as well as various extras.

One of these extra segments included studio recordings of the album prior to mixing - named the Raw and Unmixed version. Another portion of the album, named The Extras contained several radio edits, live performances (two of which were from the Live Radar EP), and B-sides, plus two fully-mixed, but unreleased tracks. The fourth portion, The Lost Album, contained a demo version of Silent Radar, with different recordings of each song on the album, plus different tracks and track orders.The 46 tracks on Silent Radar Super Deluxe were released in an effort to capture the band when it was at its peak. When the band announced the reissue, they released the different renditions of Stereo to streaming services in advance of the album.

== Track listing ==
1. "Stereo" – 4:05
2. "Any Day Now" – 4:41
3. "I'm Waiting" – 4:18
4. "Rooster" – 5:30
5. "Silent Radar" – 4:23
6. "Do It" – 5:38
7. "He's Gone" – 4:47
8. "Say Something" – 5:10
9. "On My Way" – 5:00
10. "Top of the World" – 4:10
11. "Come Around" – 3:58
12. "Brighter Hell" – 6:06

All songs written by The Watchmen, Lyrics by Joey Serlin/Daniel Greaves.

== Personnel ==
=== The Watchmen ===
- Sammy Kohn – drums, percussion, vocals
- Ken Tizzard – bass, vocals
- Daniel Greaves – lead vocals, piano, harmonica
- Joey Serlin – guitars, vocals

=== Additional musicians ===
- Benmont Tench – Hammond B3 and piano on "Rooster", "Any Day Now", and "On My Way"

=== Production ===
- Adam Kasper – producer, recorder, and mixer
- Matt Bayles and Sam Hofstedt – additional engineers
- Recorded at Studio Litho, Seattle, Washington
- Mixed at Studio X, Seattle, Washington
- Mastered by Bob Ludwig at Gateway Mastering, Portland, Maine

== Charts ==
Chart performance for Silent Radar
Chart (1999)	Peak position
Australian Albums (ARIA)	68
