= Cum Laude! =

Studio album by The Velvet Teen
- Released: July 25, 2006
- Recorded: 2005–2006
- Genre: Indie rock
- Length: 43:32
- Label: Slowdance Records
- Producer: The Velvet Teen, Ephriam Nagler

The Velvet Teen chronology
Elysium (2004)	Cum Laude! (2006)

Professional ratings
Review scores
Source	Rating
AllMusic	4/5 stars

Cum Laude! is the third studio album by the Velvet Teen. It was first released in Japan on June 28, 2006 (featuring three bonus tracks), and in the US on July 25, 2006. It was preceded by the GyzmKid EP on May 9, 2006. This is the first album recorded with drummer Casey Deitz after the departure of original drummer Logan Whitehurst, and featured a more IDM-influenced noise rock sound as opposed to the baroque pop of previous album, Elysium.

== Track listing ==
1. "333" – 3:35
2. "Flicking Clint" – 2:28
3. "Rhodekill" – 4:31
4. "False Profits" – 3:11
5. "Tokyoto" – 2:33
6. "Noi Boi" – 3:48
7. "Spin the Wink" – 4:35
8. "Bloom" – 2:42
9. "Building a Whale" – 3:29
10. "In a Steadman Spray" – 4:19
11. "Around the Roller Rink" – 3:41
12. "GyzmKid" – 4:13

Japan bonus tracks

13. "No One Gets the Best of Me" – 6:01
14. "Spin the Wink" (Little Cat Remix) – 4:36
15. "False Profits" (Cute Version) – 2:55

== Credits ==
- Judah Nagler - vocals, guitar, keyboards, synthesizer, programming
- Josh Staples - bass, vocals
- Casey Deitz - drums, vocals
- Additional vocals on "False Profits" and "Noi Boi" by Ashley Allred
- Illustrations by Judah Nagler, design and layout by Josh Staples and Judah Nagler
- Recorded at Fashion Castle, Happy Acres, Ephriam's house, and Judah's house
