= Precious (Ours album) =

Studio album by Ours
- Released: November 5, 2002
- Genre: Alternative rock
- Label: DreamWorks
- Producer: Ethan Johns

Ours chronology
Distorted Lullabies (2001)	Precious (2002)	Mercy (2008)

Professional ratings
Review scores
Source	Rating
AllMusic	4/5 stars
Rolling Stone	3/5 stars

Precious is the second album by the rock group Ours and it was released November 5, 2002. When recording this album, Jimmy Gnecco wanted to get it done quickly, and did not aim for the polished production achieved on their previous record.

== Track listing ==
1. "Kill the Band" – 4:02
2. "Realize" – 3:37
3. "Leaves" – 3:44
4. "Places" – 4:06
5. "Outside" – 1:13
6. "In a Minute" – 2:19
7. "Femme Fatale" (The Velvet Underground cover) – 3:16
8. "Broken" – 6:55
9. "Chapter 2" (Money) – 4:54
10. "If Flowers Turn" – 2:57
11. "Disaster in a Halo" – 3:32
12. "Red Colored Stars" – 4:11

All tracks composed except 6–7 by Jimmy Gnecco. Track 6 composed by Dave Milone, track 7 composed by Lou Reed.
