= Out of the Fierce Parade =

Studio album by The Velvet Teen
- Released: March 19, 2002
- Recorded: January 11–18, 2002
- Studio: The Hall of Justice, Seattle, Washington
- Genre: Indie rock
- Length: 52:45
- Label: Slowdance Records
- Producer: Chris Walla and The Velvet Teen

The Velvet Teen chronology
Out of the Fierce Parade (2002)	Elysium (2004)

Professional ratings
Review scores
Source	Rating
Allmusic	3/5 stars
Pitchfork Media	4.7/10

Out of the Fierce Parade is the full-length debut album from The Velvet Teen. It was released in the US on March 19, 2002 and on June 4, 2003 in Japan. The album's artwork was designed by Logan Whitehurst, and the album was co-produced by the band with Christopher Walla of Death Cab for Cutie. Music videos were created for the songs "Radiapathy" and "The Prize Fighter" (the latter directed by Abe Levy).

== Track listing ==
1. "A Special Gift to You" – 4:56
2. "Radiapathy" – 2:32
3. "The Prize Fighter" – 5:41
4. "Red, Like Roses" – 6:39
5. "Caspian Can Wait" – 2:56
6. "Four Story Tantrum" – 5:41
7. "Into the Open" – 5:42
8. "Penning the Penultimate" – 6:54
9. "Your Last Words" – 4:29
10. "Death" – 7:15

Japan bonus tracks

11. "Naked Girl" – 5:22
12. "Counting Backwards" – 4:17
13. "Mother of Love" – 5:04
14. "Your Cell" – 5:27
15. "Code Red" – 3:08

== Credits ==
- Recorded and mixed from January 11–18, 2002 by Christopher Walla at The Hall of Justice, Seattle, Washington.
- Produced by Christopher Walla and The Velvet Teen.
- Mastered by Paul Stubblebine.
- All music written by The Velvet Teen.
- Lyrics written by Judah Nagler, except "A Special Gift to You" by Logan Whitehurst and "Into the Open" by Judah Nagler and Logan Whitehurst.
- Etchings by Logan Whitehurst.
- Design and layout by The Velvet Teen.
