= Elysium (The Velvet Teen album) =

Studio album by The Velvet Teen
- Released: July 20, 2004
- Recorded: 2003–2004
- Genre: Indie rock
- Length: 46:32
- Label: Slowdance Records
- Producer: The Velvet Teen, Dave Trumfio, Michael Hagler

The Velvet Teen chronology
Out of the Fierce Parade (2002)	Elysium (2004)	Cum Laude! (2006)

Elysium is the second studio album from The Velvet Teen. It was first released in Japan on May 22, 2004, and in the US on July 20, 2004. A special edition version of the album was released in Japan only with a bonus DVD. The album was also pressed on double 10" vinyl and released through Pandacide Records in June 2005, featuring a bonus track. Elysium features absolutely no guitars, instead relying on keyboards and string and horn arrangements. Elysium turned out to be the last Velvet Teen album featuring the original line-up of Judah Nagler, Josh Staples and Logan Whitehurst. Logan was diagnosed with brain cancer and left the band shortly before the album's release. Casey Deitz replaced Logan on drums in spring 2004 and for the subsequent tour for the album. Logan Whitehurst died on December 3, 2006.

Professional ratings
Review scores
Source	Rating
AllMusic	2.5/5 stars
Aversion.com	(positive)
PopMatters	(positive)
Stylus Magazine	(D+)

== Track listing ==
1. "Sartre Ringo" – 3:33
2. "Penicillin (It Doesn't Mean Much)" – 4:42
3. "A Captive Audience" – 5:56
4. "Chimera Obscurant" – 12:50
5. "Poor Celine" – 6:18
6. "Forlorn" – 4:05
7. "We Were Bound (To Bend the Rules)" – 7:42
8. "(Untitled)" – 1:26

=== Japanese special edition bonus DVD ===
1. "The Prize Fighter" (Video directed by Abe Levy)
2. "The Making of 'The Prize Fighter'" (Video)
3. "Radiapathy" (Video directed by Mike Sloat)

=== US double 10" LP ===
Side I

1. "Sarte Ringo" – 3:33
2. "Penicillin (It Doesn't Mean Much)" – 4:42
3. "A Captive Audience" – 5:56

Side II

1. "Chimera Obscurant" – 12:50

Side III

1. "Poor Celine" – 6:18
2. "Forlorn" – 4:05

Side IV

1. "We Were Bound (To Bend the Rules)" – 7:42
2. "No One Gets the Best of Me" (bonus track) – 6:01

== Credits ==
- All songs written by The Velvet Teen; lyrics by Judah Nagler.
- Strings, woodwinds and horns arranged and conducted by Adam Theis.
- Recorded by Judah and Ephriam Nagler from December 2003 through March 2004 in California.
- Musicians:
  - Judah Nagler - vocals, piano, guitar (on "No One Gets the Best of Me") and electronics
  - Logan Whitehurst - drums, percussion and vocals
  - Josh Staples - bass and vocals
  - Ashley Allred - vocals on "No One Gets the Best of Me"
  - Casey Deitz - drums on "No One Gets the Best of Me"
  - Alex Budman - clarinet
  - Devon Rumrill - synth on "Chimera Obscurant"
  - Adam Theis - trombone
  - Rita Theis - flute and bass flute
  - Dina Macabee - violin and viola
  - Darcy Rindt - violin and viola
  - Jesse Ivry - cello
  - Marika Hughes - cello on "Penicillin" and "A Captive Audience"
  - Diane Peterson - violin
  - Sara Anna - violin
  - Rose Batzdorff - violin
  - Sienna S'Zell - viola
  - Linda Amari - cello on "Chimera Obscurant" and "Poor Celine"
- All photographs by Sara Sanger, except back cover by Nate Glomb.
- Illustrations by Logan Whitehurst.
- Design and layout by Josh Staples and The Velvet Teen.
