= Pleasure Club (album) =

Studio album by James Hall
- Released: 1996
- Genre: Rock
- Label: Geffen
- Producer: Phil Nicolo

James Hall chronology
My Love, Sex and Spirit (1993)	Pleasure Club (1996)

Pleasure Club is an album by the American musician James Hall, released in 1996. Starting over in the 2000s, Hall named his band for the album.

Hall supported the album by opening for Rage Against the Machine on a European tour, and for Love and Rockets in the United States. Pleasure Club's first single was "Honky Time".

== Production ==
The album was produced primarily by Phil Nicolo. Hall took more satisfaction from his live show, and regarded the album as a primer for what he could do onstage. He considered the album's music to be "anti-grunge", noting its theatricality.

== Critical reception ==
Professional ratings
Review scores
Source	Rating
AllMusic	4.5/5 stars
The Encyclopedia of Popular Music	2/5 stars
The Sydney Morning Herald	3/5 stars

Trouser Press wrote that "Hall’s singing is more ragged and urgent; he’s finally developed a distinctive vocal style of his own." CMJ New Music Monthly stated that the album "finds [Hall] infusing a soulful, bluesy wail into a pastiche of '70s and '80s influences—sort of like what would have come after Raw Power if Iggy had followed Bowie into his Philadelphia soul phase." The Times-Picayune deemed it "an edgy, post-punk, post-pop brand of new rock."

Guitar Player determined that "guitarist Lynn Wright supports ... Hall with sizzling treble tones, an acidic, razor-edged attack and a healthy eclecticism that embraces psychedelic R&B, blues-infused punk and neoroots balladry." The Sydney Morning Herald noted that Hall "has a sound sense of dynamics, knowing when to hold back, and when to let loose." The Philadelphia Inquirer opined that Pleasure Club "catches Hall in somewhat reserved demeanor—at times, he sounds as though he's emulating Jeff Buckley's moody moves."

AllMusic called the album "brilliant, powerful stuff," writing: "Much less obviously derivative than the Black Crowes or Lenny Kravitz, Hall's distinctive sound may remind you of the greats, but by album's end he's carved out his own niche."

== Track listing ==
No.	Title	Length
1.	"Pleasure Club"
2.	"Illingness"
3.	"Heatwave Radio"
4.	"Morninglust"
5.	"Honky Time"
6.	"Should Know Better"
7.	"Black Is Black"
8.	"I'm Needy"
9.	"Back Stabbing"
10.	"Elevation"
11.	"Illustrated Babeis"
12.	"Use Me, Baby"
13.	"Need My Man"
14.	"So Precious"
