= Stereo (The Watchmen song) =

Single by The Watchmen

from the album Silent Radar
- Released: March 16, 1998
- Recorded: 1997
- Genre: Alternative rock
- Length: 4:05
- Label: EMI
- Producer(s): Adam Kasper

The Watchmen singles chronology
"Zoom" (1996)	"Stereo" (1998)	"Any Day Now" (1998)

"Stereo" is a song by Canadian band The Watchmen. The song was released as the lead single from the band's fourth studio album, Silent Radar. The song's music video received considerable airplay on MuchMusic. Between 1995 and 2016, "Stereo" was among the top 25 most played songs by Canadian artists on rock radio stations in Canada. It is considered to be one of the band's signature songs.

== Charts ==
Chart (1998)	Peak position
Canadian RPM Alternative 30	5
Chart (1999)	Peak position
Australia (ARIA)	51
