= Any Day Now (The Watchmen song) =

Single by The Watchmen

from the album Silent Radar
- Released: 1998
- Genre: Alternative rock
- Length: 4:41
- Label: EMI
- Songwriter(s): Joey Serlin, The Watchmen
- Producer(s): Adam Kasper

The Watchmen singles chronology
"Stereo" (1998)	"Any Day Now" (1998)	"Say Something" (1998)

"Any Day Now" is the second single by Canadian band The Watchmen from their fourth studio album, Silent Radar.

In 2011, the song was featured in the opening montage of Hockey Night in Canada in the first game in Winnipeg of the returning Winnipeg Jets.

== Charts ==
Chart (1998)	Peak position
Canadian RPM Singles Chart	39
Canadian RPM Alternative 30	3
