= Brand New Day (The Watchmen album) =

Studio album by The Watchmen
- Released: March 20, 1996
- Recorded: Hallamusic Recording Studios, Toronto, ON
- Genre: Rock
- Length: 44:01
- Label: MCA Records
- Producer: Mr. Colson

The Watchmen chronology
| In The Trees (1994) | Brand New Day (1996) | Silent Radar (1998) |

Singles from Brand New Day
- 1. "Incarnate" Released: 1996; 2. "Shut Up" Released: 1996; 3. "Zoom" Released: 1996

Professional ratings
Review scores
| Source | Rating |
|---|---|
| Allmusic | 3/5 stars |
| Winnipeg Free Press | 4.5/5 stars |

Brand New Day is the third studio album by The Watchmen. It was released in March 1996. Although the song "Incarnate" was a moderate hit, this album was the least popular of the band's studio albums. The band made three videos ("Incarnate", "Shut Up", and "Zoom") which all saw play on MuchMusic, but the extra promotion was not enough to boost the success of the album.

This is considered to be the only studio album by the band not to be certified at least Gold in Canada by the Canadian Recording Industry Association. This was seen as a major disappointment as this album followed the band's most commercially successful release (In The Trees).

The band has noted that they went into the recording studio less prepared than before. This allowed more studio experimentation than previous releases including more strings, harp, piano, trumpet, viola, violin and cello. Because the tracks were shaped in the studio, most of the album was not designed specifically to be played live. This proved to be a challenge for a band noted for their live shows.

The album provided the band with their second Juno nomination as they were nominated for North Star Rock Album of the Year at the 1997 Juno Awards. As was the case with their first Juno nomination, the band lost the award to their MCA Records labelmates, The Tragically Hip.

== Track listing ==
1. "Zoom" (Music: The Watchmen, Lyrics: Joey Serlin) - 3:29
2. "Shut Up" (Music: The Watchmen, Lyrics: Daniel Greaves) - 3:49
3. "Incarnate" (Serlin) - 3:21
4. "Dance Some More" (Music: The Watchmen, Lyrics: Greaves) - 3:39
5. "Kill The Day" (Serlin) - 3:17
6. "Tumbleweed" (Music: The Watchmen, Lyrics: Serlin) - 3:05
7. "The Other Side/Waste Away" (Music: The Watchmen, Lyrics: Greaves) - 3:30/3:34
8. "My Favorite One" (Music: The Watchmen, Lyrics: Greaves) - 3:59
9. "Bicycle" (Music: The Watchmen, Lyrics: Serlin) - 4:16
10. "Beach Music" (The Watchmen) - 4:27
11. "What You Did" (Serlin) - 3:26

All songs arranged by The Watchmen.

== Album credits ==
=== Personnel ===
- Daniel Greaves - Vocals, Piano, Harmonica
- Ken Tizzard - Bass
- Joey Serlin - Guitars, Vocals
- Sammy Kohn - Drums, Percussion, Vocals

=== Additional personnel ===
- Ari Posner - Piano on "What You Did"
- Michael White - Trumpet on "Dance Some More"
- Mary Gaines - Cello on "Kill The Day"
- Chris Wagoner - Viola on "Kill The Day"

=== Production ===
- Mr. Colson - Producer, Engineer
- Neil Cameron - Additional Engineering
- Recorded Hallamusic Recording Studios, Toronto, ON
- Additional Recording at Private Ear Recording Studios, Winnipeg, MB and Smart Studios, Madison, WI
- Mixed at Smart Studios by Mr. Colson
- Assisted by Mike Zirkel and Mark Haines
- Mastered by Ted Jensen at Sterling Sound, New York, NY

== See also ==
- The Watchmen Bio
- The Watchmen - Videos
- New Day Dawning For Watchmen
- Time For Watchmen
