= Judah Nagler =

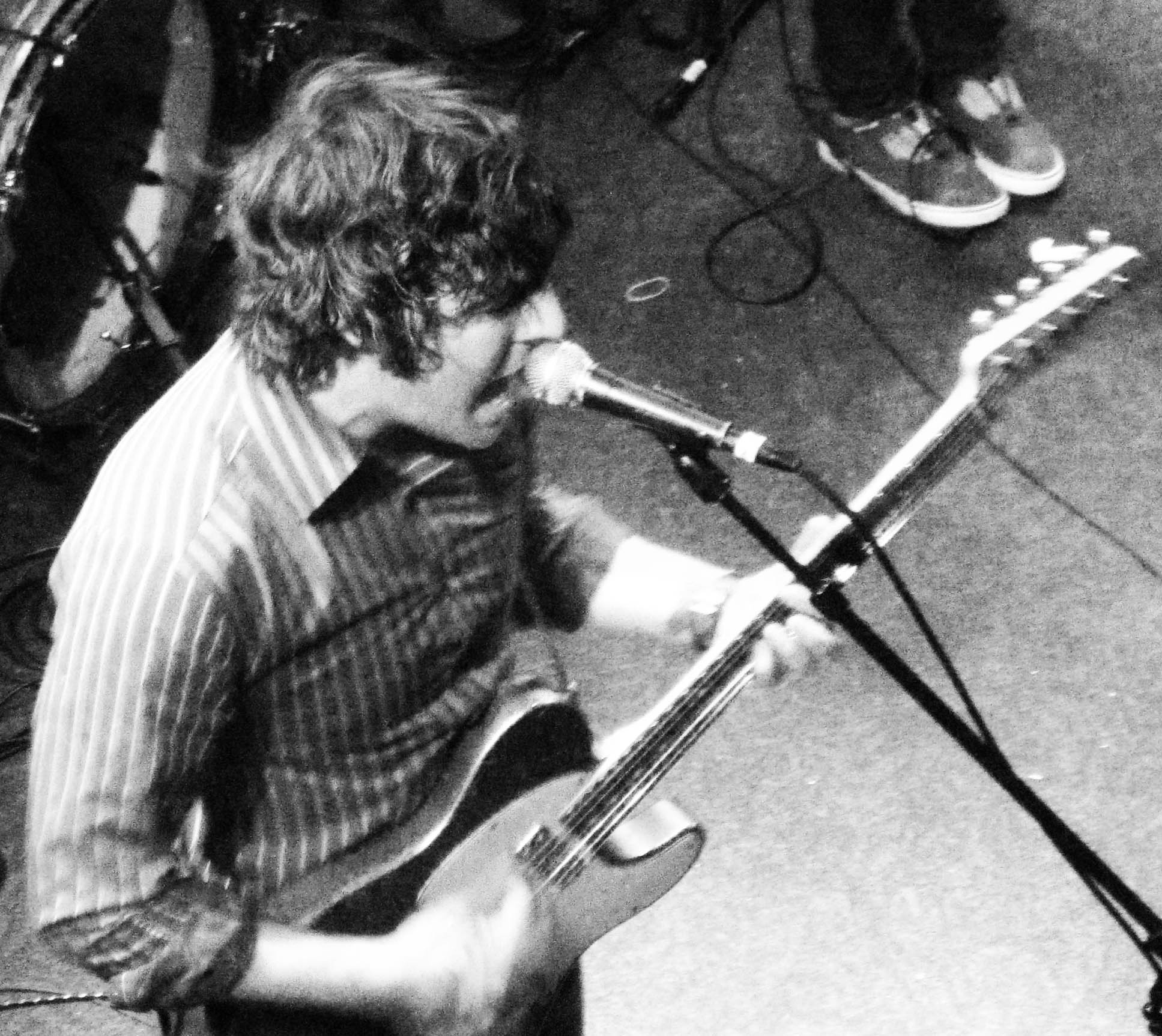
- Nagler performing in 2011

Background information
- Also known as: Atair
- Born: June 19, 1980 (age 44)
- Member of: The Velvet Teen
- Formerly of: Tin Circus; Little Tin Frog
- Website: judahnagler.com

Judah Nagler is the singer for The Velvet Teen, an indie/baroque pop band from Santa Rosa in Northern California. He was born on June 19, 1980. He is also a graphic designer and web developer, and has created artwork for The Velvet Teen and other bands.

== Career ==
=== Tin Circus ===
Previous to his work with The Velvet Teen, Judah sang and played bass in the California ska band "Tin Circus".

=== The Secret Band and The Velvet Teen ===
After a stint in a band called Little Tin Frog, Judah and bandmate Logan Whitehurst wrote several songs together in secret, writing under the moniker The Secret Band. After releasing a demo as The Secret Band on Mp3.com they were joined by Josh Staples of The Wunder Years. The new line up took the name Judah had been using for his electronic side project, The Velvet Teen. The Velvet Teen are currently active.

=== Atair ===
Atair is the current working title of Judah's electronic side-project. The yet-to-be released debut album has been in the works since 2003.

=== Judah and Daniel ===
Released one song on west-coast indie sampler Translation Music Volume 2, called All The Rest Are for You.

=== Odd Bird ===
As of late 2009, Judah has been in the band Odd Bird with his girlfriend, Ashley Allred, his brother, Ephriam, and bassist for Litany for the Whale, Jef Overn.

=== Five Beats One ===
Since early 2010, Judah played the drums in the band Five Beats One. Their first EP, mixed by Kerry Brown and Kevin Dippold, is due out in August 2011 from Saint Rose Records.

=== Contributions ===
He has contributed to several projects including Denver Dalley's Intamural, P.O.S, and Neverending White Lights.

=== Producing ===
The Velvet Teen's Elysium, GyzmKid, and Cum Laude!

== Discography ==
=== As The Velvet Teen ===
- Comasynthesis EP (March 2000)
- The Great Beast February EP (February 2001)
- Immortality EP (November 2001)
- Out of the Fierce Parade (March 19, 2002)
- Elysium (July 20, 2004)
- "Seven Eight," "Bass Harmonic," and "Leave Sweet Jean Alone" (three songs released on The Aviary soundtrack) (2005)
- The Velvet Teen/Sin in Space split 7-inch (2005)
- One song on the soundtrack for Lurking in Suburbia (2006)
- GyzmKid EP (May 9, 2006)
- Cum Laude! (July 25, 2006)
- No Star EP (October 22, 2010)
- "All Is Illusory" (June 30, 2015)

=== Various projects and contributions ===
- Tin Circus, Picture This (1998)
- Little Tin Frog, Brilliant Ideas (1998)
- Little Tin Frog, Enetophobia (1999)
- The Secret Band, Special Little Devil, released on mp3.com (1999)
- Judah and Daniel All The Rest Are For You (Translation Music vol. 2)
- Contributed to an album by label-mates The Roots of Orchis as Atair: "Orkid" on the album Crooked Ceilings (2004)
- Return our Lives Featuring Judah on vocals. Recorded for Act 1: Goodbye Friends of the Heavenly Bodies, a collaborative album put out by Neverending White Lights, a Daniel Victor project (2005)
- Additional vocals on Menos el Oso, an album by Minus the Bear (April 23, 2005)
- Vocals on "Queens of Comparison" for album This is a Landslide by label mates Intramural (2007)
- Vocals on "Never Better" for the P.O.S record Never Better (2009)

=== Trivia ===
- In the December/January 2005 issue of ELLE girl magazine, Judah was voted as one of the "50 Hottest Rockers."
