= Ballet the Boxer 1 =

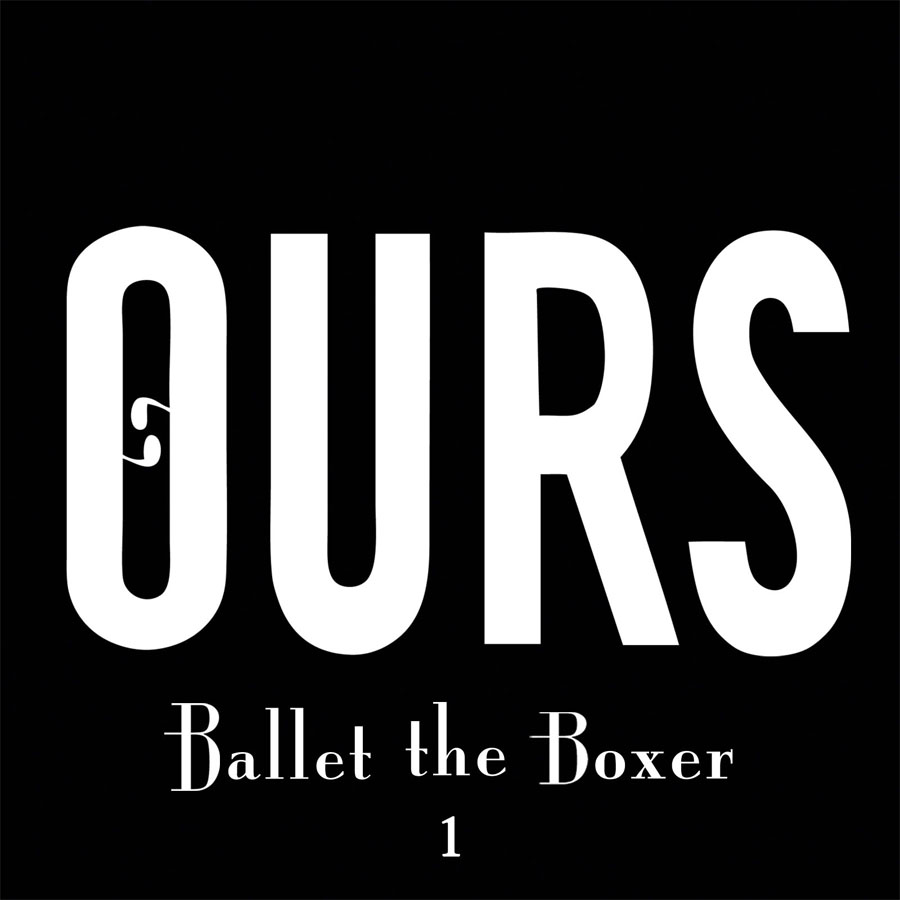

Studio album by Ours
- Released: June 11, 2013
- Genre: Alternative rock
- Label: Cage Recording Company
- Producer: Jimmy Gnecco

Ours chronology
Mercy (Dancing for the Death of an Imaginary Enemy) (2008)	Ballet the Boxer 1 (2013)	New Age Heroine II (2018)

Ballet the Boxer 1 is the fourth studio album by the American rock band Ours, released on June 11, 2013 by Cage Recording Company. Ours released a music video for the song "Devil," which featured the final filmed performance by actor David Carradine and was directed by Michael Maxxis.

== Track listing ==
1. "Pretty Pain" (5:11)
2. "Emergency" (2:29)
3. "Coming For You" (4:01)
4. "Devil" (4:24)
5. "Been Down" (5:54)
6. "Stand" (3:49)
7. "Boxer" (4:33)
8. "Sing" (3:20)
9. "Get Em Out" (3:13)
10. "Fall into My Hands" (6:11)

== Production ==
- Produced by Jimmy Gnecco.
- Additional production Henry Hirsch, Joey Barnes, and Brett Romnes.
- Recorded, mixed, and mastered by Henry Hirsch at Waterfront Studios.
