= Logan Whitehurst =

American drummer

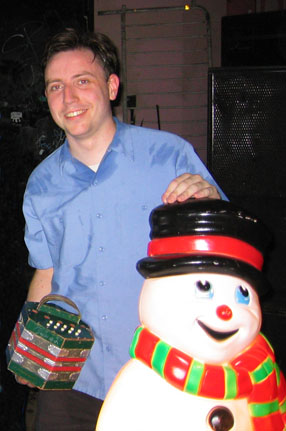
- Logan Whitehurst and Vanilla the Plastic Snowman

Background information
- Born: November 15, 1977; Los Banos, California, U.S.
- Died: December 3, 2006 (aged 29) Los Banos, California, U.S.
- Genres: Alternative rock
- Instruments: Drums; keyboards; concertina; vocals; guitar; bass; accordion
- Years active: 1995–2006
- Labels: Pandacide; Slowdance; Mp3.com; Needlejuice

Logan Anthony Whitehurst (November 15, 1977 – December 3, 2006) was an American musician. His career began as the drummer for the band Little Tin Frog from 1995 until 2000, although he is best known as a founding member of Californian indie rock band The Velvet Teen and as a solo artist performing under the name Logan Whitehurst and the Junior Science Club.

Whitehurst was also an accomplished graphic designer, creating numerous album covers for bands such as his sister's Tsunami Bomb, in addition to Dynamite Boy, Little Tin Frog, The Velvet Teen, Mullet, 20 Minute Loop, Go Time, Shut Up Donny, Santiago, and labels such as Fearless Records, Restitution Records, Silent Records and Entertainment, and Double Helix Records. He also contributed illustrations and comics such as "Jonathan Quimby, the Boy with No Brain" to Section M Magazine.

== The Velvet Teen ==
During their stint together playing in Little Tin Frog, Whitehurst and guitarist Judah Nagler began secretly writing somber, serious songs. This side project came to be known as The Secret Band. Some time after the split of Little Tin Frog, The Secret Band reshaped itself and took on the name of Nagler's electronica-influenced solo project, The Velvet Teen. Adding bassist Josh Staples, the band's catalogue included several re-recorded Secret Band tracks, such as "A Reverie to Chanticleer" and "Mother of Love." The band signed with Slowdance Records.

In 2001, the band released +-=, an EP of both older songs co-written by Whitehurst and new recordings. In early 2002, the band released their first full-length album, Out of the Fierce Parade. The album was produced and mixed by Death Cab for Cutie guitarist Chris Walla. The album's first track, "A Special Gift to You" was written solely by Whitehurst. He also co-wrote all the other tracks on the album. Out of the Fierce Parade also featured Whitehurst's engravings as the cover and inside the CD booklet.

Touring in support of Out of the Fierce Parade took Whitehurst across the country, as far east and south as Orlando, Florida, as well as out of the country with dates in Japan.

The band received airplay on MTV2, which played their videos for "Radiapathy" and "The Prize Fighter." MTV also included portions of "The Prize Fighter" in its pseudo-reality series Sorority Life. The independent film Lurking in Suburbia also featured original music from the group.

Released in 2004, The Velvet Teen's next album, Elysium, was Whitehurst's last with the band. Shortly after recording the album, he left the band in order to undergo treatment for brain cancer. He was never able to tour in support of the album.

== Solo career ==
In addition to drumming for The Velvet Teen, he had a successful solo career as Logan Whitehurst and the Junior Science Club. In 1997, Whitehurst began uploading songs he had created on a four-track to Mp3.com, which served not only as a storage space, but an advertising and publishing firm. Mp3.com allowed Whitehurst's music to be downloaded as well as purchased. He was one of Mp3.com's early success stories, gaining national popularity in the "Comic Song" category. Whitehurst released his first five albums through Mp3.com.

Whitehurst played not only the drums in his solo work, but also keyboards, guitar, accordion, concertina, and piano. He also provided almost all of his backup vocals through multitracking. His music has often been compared to Flight of the Conchords and They Might Be Giants for its goofy, geeky subject matter as well as its underlying musicality.

In 2003, having signed with Pandacide Records, Whitehurst released his sixth album, Goodbye, My 4-Track. The album featured guest appearances by members of The Velvet Teen, Death Cab for Cutie, Pedro the Lion, and many other bands. Whitehurst was never able to tour nationally in support of the album due to his involvement with the Velvet Teen and, later, his illness. However, he still did local shows, going as far away as Portland, OR.

His quirky brand of music quickly garnered a cult following from coast to coast. He became one of the most frequently requested and played artists on the nationally syndicated Dr. Demento radio show. Dr. Demento dedicated two full shows to his music and interviews.

In 2004, Whitehurst completed all of the score and incidental music for Replica, an independent film by Raymond Daigle that illustrates the trials, tribulations and mayhem of working in a copy shop.

In 2006, after his cancer had been declared in remission, Whitehurst took suggestions for an enormous number of short-subject songs from his friends and fans to get himself back into musical shape. Ranging from 30 to 90 seconds, the 81 songs were recorded over the span of two months. Shortly after designing the album art and layout for the Very Tiny Songs Project, Whitehurst's brain cancer returned. The album was released posthumously on December 26, 2006, with a foreword by Dr. Demento.

=== Vanilla the Plastic Snowman ===
A plastic Christmas lawn ornament, Vanilla served as an unofficial mascot for the Science Club. The character was depicted as having an inflated sense of self-importance, frequently claiming credit for notable events throughout history and alleging that Logan had appropriated his work. Although Vanilla never spoke during live performances, the character maintained a blog updated on a regular basis, covering a mixture of personal observations and commentary on current events. Posts were written in a deliberately garbled style, attributed in-character to the difficulty of typing while wearing mittens.

== Illness and death ==
From November 2003 onward Whitehurst battled fatigue, headaches, dizziness, and stomach illness. In May 2004 it was discovered that the ailments he was suffering were due to a cancerous brain tumor. Deciding to focus on his recovery, he left the Velvet Teen and put his solo career on hiatus. He spent the better part of a year and a half in treatments for the recurring brain cancer. On December 3, 2006, Whitehurst died at his home in Los Banos, California.

From many donations, the fledgling Remember Logan Foundation was founded. Created by his fans, its mission is to provide funding for brain cancer research and treatment.

In October 2010, a group of comedy musicians created the Logan Whitehurst Memorial Award for Excellence in Comedy Music, or Logan Awards for short. The awards are presented annually at FuMPFest for songs from the previous year in three categories: Outstanding Original Comedy Song, Outstanding Parody Song, and Outstanding Comedy Music Video.

== Discography ==
=== Studio albums ===
- Outsmartin' the Popos (1997)
- I Would Be a Biggest Octopus (1998)
- How Does an Electrostatic Motor Work? (1999)
- Earth Is Big (2000)
- Goodbye, My 4-Track (2003)
- Very Tiny Songs (2006)

=== EPs ===
- Denture/Doorknob (1999)
- Mini Album of Luv (2003)

=== Collections ===
- Miscellaneous L (1998)
- Miscelloganous Volume One (2021)

=== Albums featuring Whitehurst ===
- The Pain and Pleasure Machine (1997, drums),
- Brilliant Ideas (1999, drums)
- Comasynthesis/The Great Beast February (2000, drums, vocals)
- +-= (2001, drums, vocals, keyboards)
- Immortality (2001, drums, vocals)
- Out of the Fierce Parade (2002, drums, piano, vocals)
- Elysium (2004, drums, piano, vocals)

== Other bands and collaborations ==
- The End Is Near (Headboard, 1996, keyboards)
- Warning: Do Not Open This Box (Little Tin Frog, 1996, drums)
- This Is It! Proof... (Little Tin Frog, 1996, drums)
- The Pain and Pleasure Machine (Little Tin Frog, 1997, drums)
- Brilliant Ideas (Little Tin Frog, 1998, drums, vocals)
- Enetophobia (Little Tin Frog, 1999, drums, vocals)
- Special Little Devil (The Secret Band, 1999, drums, keyboards, concertina, vocals)
- Future Is Turning (Luckie Strike, 2000, Assistant Engineer/Producer, backing vocals)
- The Mercury Project (Luckie Strike, 2000, Assistant Engineer/Producer, backing vocals)
