= Polar Bears (band) =

- Origin: Santa Rosa, California
- Genres: Indie rock, punk rock
- Labels: Saint Rose Records
- Members: Matthew Izen; Benjamin Henning; Shane Goepel
- Past members: Peter Bonos
- Website: www.myspace.com/plrbrs

Polar Bears are an indie rock band from Santa Rosa, California, USA, who currently play in and around the North Bay music scene. They have toured nationally with longtime friends The Velvet Teen and have done numerous West Coast tours since their inception in 2001. In March 2004, they released an EP, Shorts Are for Warm, on the Petaluma-based record label, Pandacide. In early 2007, Polar Bears self-released a full-length album, The Future King. Currently, this album is only available directly from the band at their live shows and from The Last Record Store in Santa Rosa. Polar Bears are notable in the Sonoma County music scene for being one of the biggest drawing and intensely furious live bands in the area. Their following has steadily grown, being featured in publications such as the North Bay Bohemian and Metroactive.com. Bands that Polar Bears have shared the stage with include Victims Family, Cursive, Nomeansno, The Casket Lottery and Aloha (band).

== Other projects ==
Shane Goepel helped start Litany for the Whale with the Sonoma County musicians Richard McKee, Jef Overn and the Bostonian Michael Conrad. Goepel and McKee left the band in 2008. Matthew Izen played in The Velvet Teen from 2007 to 2012. He played guitar in The New Trust after Michael Richardson left the band. He has also recorded and produced records for bands around the area, most notably The New Trust and Loma Prieta.

== Discography ==
=== As 'Polar Bears' ===
- Shorts Are for Warm - 2004 (Pandacide)
- The Future King - 2007 (Self-released)

=== As 'The Set Up' ===
- Unwritten Tomes and Motor Homes EP
- Bats Need Friends
