= In the Trees =

Studio album by The Watchmen
- Released: July 13, 1994
- Recorded: April – May 1994
- Studio: Metalworks Studios (Mississauga, ON); Smart Studios (Madison, WI)
- Genre: Alternative rock
- Length: 51:36
- Label: MCA Records
- Producer: Mr. Colson

The Watchmen chronology
McLaren Furnace Room (1992)	In the Trees (1994)	Brand New Day (1996)

Singles from In the Trees
- 1. "Boneyard Tree" Released: 1994; 2. "Wiser" Released: 1994; 3. "All Uncovered" Released: 1994; 4. "Lusitana" Released: 1995

Professional ratings
Review scores
Source	Rating
AllMusic	4/5 stars

In The Trees is the second studio album by Canadian rock band The Watchmen. It was the first album to be released with Ken Tizzard on bass, who joined the band in 1994 when Pete Loewen left. With hit singles "Boneyard Tree", "All Uncovered", and "Lusitana", this was the band's breakthrough release in their home country of Canada. Videos for both "Boneyard Tree" and "All Uncovered" received heavy play on MuchMusic. At this time, singer Daniel Greaves began to become more comfortable with his songwriting ability. Because of this, only three of the album's songs were credited to guitarist Joey Serlin.

== Commercial performance ==
The album was certified Platinum in Canada by the Canadian Recording Industry Association on May 31, 1995. To date, this is the band's only Platinum album in Canada. By March 1996, the album had sold 150,000 copies in Canada.

== Track listing ==
All tracks are written by The Watchmen. Except where noted.

No.	Title	Writer(s)	Length
1.	"34 Dead St."		3:13
2.	"Boneyard Tree"	Joey Serlin	4:08
3.	"Lusitana"		4:36
4.	"Wiser"		3:15
5.	"Calm"	Serlin	4:09
6.	"All Uncovered"		4:34
7.	"In My Mind"	Serlin	4:00
8.	"Laugher"		4:46
9.	"The South"		4:07
10.	"Born Afire"		4:41
11.	"Vovo Diva"		3:45
12.	"Middle East"		6:07

== Personnel ==
Adapted credits from the liner notes of In the Trees.

The Watchmen

- Ken Tizzard - Bass
- Joey Serlin - Guitar, Vocals
- Sammy Kohn - Drums, Percussion, Vocals
- Daniel Greaves - Vocals, Piano, Harp

Additional musician

- Mary Gaines - Cello on "All Uncovered"

Production

- Mr. Colson - Producer, Engineer
- Assisted by Mark Peters and Mike Zirkel
- Recorded at Metal Works Studios, Mississauga, ON
- Additional recording at Smart Studios, Madison, WI
- Mixed at Smart Studios by Mr. Colson
- Mastered by Bob Ludwig at Gateway Mastering, Portland, ME
