= Lakeview Restaurant =

Diner in Toronto, Ontario, Canada

Coordinates: 43°38′59″N 79°25′13″W

- Interactive map of Lakeview Restaurant

Restaurant information
- Established: 1932
- Food type: Diner
- Location: 1132 Dundas Street West, Toronto
- Website: Official Website

Lakeview Restaurant has been a traditional diner in Toronto, Canada, since 1932. It has been featured in films, television programs, and other Canadiana. The menu offers classic diner style dining from burgers, brunch, milkshakes, craft beers, and specialty sandwiches.

== History ==
The Lakeview Restaurant is a diner located at 1132 Dundas Street West in the Trinity Bellwoods neighbourhood of Toronto. It was built in 1932 and features a neon sign that reads "Always Open", the diner started 24-hour-a-day operations to serve shift workers at a nearby Massey Ferguson factory. 24-hour opening stopped in 2021.

The restaurant was previously owned and operated by restaurateur Alex Sengupta, Fadi Hakim and musician Daniel Greaves and was bought in 2008 by Hakim and business partner, Alexander Sengupta.

Lakeview serves as a meeting hub for Lev Gleason Publications, Hakim's other business venture. Item menus include the Captain Canuck sandwich and uses comic book print liners.

== Popular culture ==
James Bouy was the chef in 2013 when the diner featured in Guy Fieri's Diners, Drive-Ins and Dives in 2013.

Lakeview has appeared in many films and television programs throughout the decades, often recognizable for its classic aesthetic and authentic ties to past eras. Prior co-owner Hakim has offered local independent film productions to shoot at the Lakeview for free to support the industry through the pandemic.

=== Film ===
- Cocktail (1988)
- Harrison Bergeron (1995)
- The Boondock Saints (1999)
- Confessions of a Teenage Drama Queen (2004)
- Hairspray (2007)
- Max Payne (2008)
- A Raisin in the Sun (2008)
- Take This Waltz (2011)
- The Samaritan (2012)
- Cosmopolis (2012)
- The Shape of Water (2017)
- Condor (2018)

=== Television ===
- Nikita (2010)
- Umbrella Academy (2019)
- Mayor of Kingstown (2021)
- Jupiter’s Legacy (2021)
- Reacher (2022)
- Star Trek: Strange New Worlds (2022)
