= 20 Minute Loop =

American Pop Band

- Origin: San Francisco
- Genres: Freak pop
- Years active: 1996–2009; 2014–present
- Labels: Trystero Records; Fortune Records; none
- Members: Kelly Atkins; Greg Giles; Nils Erickson; Adam Cunha; Mike Romano; Kevin Seal
- Past members: Joe Ostrowski; James Kingsbury; Alex Kamages; James Costello Kingsbury; Dan Jones; Ethan Turner; Tai Kenning
- Website: 20minuteloop.com (Archived) https://www.20minloop.com/

20 Minute Loop is a San Francisco-based band notable for its self-proclaimed "freak-pop" sound which exhibits hook-heavy tunes and complex vocal harmonies.

The band split up in 2009, but has since reformed.

== History ==
In its most rudimentary form, 20 Minute Loop was founded innominately by Giles during college, circa 1995, as a home-recording project. He recorded a handful of demos to 8-track tape, but never officially released them. He did, however, have the opportunity to play them live to small audiences acoustically several times, usually with the vocal accompaniment of Kelly Atkins, who would later be the only consistent member in 20 Minute Loop besides Giles.

Giles originally toyed with other band names, such as With God on the Dog Team Trail, Pierre Bon Bon, Kill Whitey!, and PSA Flight 182, before finally settling on 20 Minute Loop. The band's name alluded to the duration of cockpit conversation recorded by an airplane's cockpit voice recorder for recovery in the event of a crash or other accident.

The actual band was established by Greg Giles in 1996, and their debut EP, With God On The Dog Team Trail, was released on New Year's Day in 1997. (Apart from Kelly Atkins, the band lineup Giles recruited for the EP featured no members of the final lineup.) With God On The Dog Team Trail featured a lo-fi rendition of "Jubilation"—which was rerecorded for Decline of Day—as well as three other songs that were never released in any other form. With God On The Dog Team Trail was released on a small indie label, Trystero Records, which was run by a friend of Giles and has since gone defunct.

The band soon parted with Trystero, and struggled along for a while with no means of releasing their music. They had recorded their first, self-titled album, and were already in the process of recording Decline of Day, when Jim Greer of the small, Berkeley-based indie label Fortune Records (not to be confused with the defunct Detroit, Michigan-based label of the same name) approached and offered to sign them. This begun a long-lasting relationship with Fortune Records—Greer would go on to release their first 3 albums and a split 7-inch with The Monolith.

Their debut album, 20 Minute Loop, was released to mostly positive critical reception, and thanks to positive publicity from local venues and indie distributor Aquarius Records, among others, they gained some recognition from the Bay Area indie scene. The band also played a great many shows in order to receive more publicity.

With a label deal and an album to their name, the band quickly released their second album, Decline of Day. This album received much more publicity, with positive reviews from Pitchfork, Allmusic, and CD Universe, et alia; yet the group still remained fairly unknown. The artwork for the album was provided by The Velvet Teen's lead singer Judah Nagler.

The band's breakthrough would arrive along with their next album, Yawn + House = Explosion, reviews for which appeared in nearly a dozen printed publications, as well as countless indie blogs. The artwork for Yawn + House = Explosion was of particular interest to many; the outside consisted of two different shots of a prepubescent girl grasping chickens, and the inside pamphlet consisted of the lyrics, many of which were determined using a dictionary game invented by the band, spelled out in such a way that it could be seen how certain words were strung together with the lyrics. This was the only album of 20 Minute Loop's to sell out; it sold a couple thousand copies.

The band parted from Fortune Records for unclear reasons to record their fourth album, Famous People Marry Famous People. The album, released in 2008, was arguably the band's most polished and intricate—it was recorded at John Vanderslice's renowned Tiny Telephone Studios in San Francisco, and featured over a half-dozen extra performers. The album featured highly conceptual songs, with sophisticated underlying themes explained on each song's individual Bandcamp page. The album received slightly less publicity due to the loss of a label, but the band still did very well, receiving positive publicity from many well-known sites, such as PopMatters and KQED, amongst others.

The band played a few more shows before announcing a breakup on their Myspace, due to an inability to continue "outmaneuvering real-life contingencies". They announced that their "final show ever" would take place on November 15, but, untrue to their word, they reunited for Noise Pop 2012, opening for Imperial Teen.

In 2014, Greg Giles and Kelly Atkins reformed 20 Minute Loop with Kevin Seal of Griddle to unearth songs in a new stripped down format, including piano, guitar, viola and trumpet and focusing more on vocal harmonies and lyrical content. Jim Greer of Fortune Records was inspired to record this version of 20 Minute Loop. They released the album Songs Praising the Mutant Race in 2017, and have had numerous appearances since then, their most recent being in February 2023 at Great American Music Hall.

== Members ==
- Kelly Atkins – Vocals, Keyboards, Synthesizer, Rhodes, Wurlitzer, Flute, Samples
- Greg Giles – Guitar, Vocals, Synthesizer
- Nils Erickson – Bass, Guitar, Rhodes, Clavinet, Pedal Steel Guitar, Backing Vocals
- Adam Cunha – Bass, Backing Vocals
- Mike Romano – Drums, Percussion, Piano, Backing Vocals
- Kevin Seal – Piano, Rhodes, Vocals

=== Former members ===
- Joe Ostrowski – Guitar
- James Kingsbury – Bass
- Alex Kamages – Drums
- Dan Jones – Bass
- Ethan Turner – Drums
- Tai Kenning – Drums, Percussion

== Discography ==
=== Studio albums ===
- With God On The Dog Team Trail CD (Trystero, 1997)
1. Jubilation
2. Onion Smut
3. Car Crash
4. The Song You Hear Before You Die
- 20 Minute Loop CD (Fortune Records, 1999)
1. She Hated Dogs
2. Everybody Out
3. Face Like A Horse
4. Aeroflot
5. Up On The Hill
6. Disconnect
7. You Know So Much
8. Bunnyman and Chickengirl
9. Hookworm
10. All My Friends/Drowning
- Decline of Day CD (Fortune Records, 2001)
1. Jubilation
2. Moses
3. All Manner
4. Daughter's Down
5. Pilot Light
6. Force of Habit
7. Mechanical Angels
8. Elephant
9. Mompha Termina
10. Vaccine
11. Hell In A Handbasket
12. Aquarium Song/Kiddie Porn Sting
- Yawn + House = Explosion CD (Fortune Records, 2005)
1. Parking Lot
2. Cora May
3. Properties Of Dirt
4. Book of J
5. Carlos the Jackal
6. It's Time To Honor Ghouls
7. Ambassadors
8. 5 AM to 9 AM
9. Our William Tell
10. I'll Never Forget You
11. Miriam Hopkins
- Famous People Marry Famous People CD (Self-Released, 2009)
1. Vanilla March
2. Dr. Vitus Werdegast
3. English As A Second Language
4. The Bone Is The Orbital Planet Of The Nerve
5. Automatic Pilot
6. Empire
7. We Wait For The Crown
8. Mercury Vapor
9. Latin Names and Straight Pins
10. ESMA
11. The Kirkbridge Plan
12. Winsor McCay
- Songs Praising the Mutant Race (Self-Released, 2017)
1. Mercury Vapor
2. English as a Second language
3. Empire
4. Giftgas
5. Elephant
6. Hell in a Handbasket
7. Parking Lot
8. Drowning
9. Aquarium
10. Carlos the Jackal
11. Winsor McCay
12. Never My Love

=== Compilation appearances ===
- She Hated Dogs appears on Fortune Cookies (Fortune Records, 2000)
- Pilot Light appears on Azadi! (Fire Museum, 2003)
- Miriam Hopkins appears on West of Eden (Zip Records, 2006)
- Our William Tell appears on Fortune Cookies: Part II (Fortune Records, 2006)
