= Supergarage =

superGARAGE
- Origin: Thorold, Ontario, Canada
- Genres: indie rock, alternative rock
- Years active: 1995–2007
- Labels: Iron America, Sextant Records
- Past members: Marco DiFelice; Adam Mott; Rob Passero; Michael Rosenthal; Mike Palermo; Roger Habel Jr.
- Website: supergarage.com

Supergarage (stylized as superGARAGE) was a Canadian indie rock band formed in 1995 in Thorold. They released one EP and three full-length albums.

== History ==
Supergarage took their name from an auto shop owned by Passero's father. Supergarage is based out of Toronto. In 1995, they released their six-song EP Duct Tape, which had the radio hit "Post-Teen Crisis". In 1997, they released their self-titled debut album on Iron Music/BMG.

Original guitarist Mike Palermo left the band in 1998 to start a music store, Mikes Music. Original drummer Roger Habel Jr. left the band in 2002 and started several successful cover bands such as Betty Ford Band and Stays in Vegas.

In early 2000, they released Demolition, which garnered them praise for their mock video hit "Cheryl". Other videos made for that album were "Five Year Rut" and "On a Summer Nite". The band toured extensively in 2001 in support of the album.

In 2002, they released Elvis Was Bigger Than the Beatles through Sextant Records. It was reissued in 2003 on EMI. Their single from this record was "Sugar", which did very well on Canadian radio.

Supergarage toured with the Headstones, Big Sugar, I Mother Earth, Barstool Prophets, Matthew Good, Soul Asylum, and Green Day. The band was known as one of the hardest working bands in Canada and as road warriors.

They also had a track in Petz: Dogz 2, "Pop Pop Radio instrumental".

== Members ==
- Marco DiFelice – vocals
- Mike Palermo – guitar
- Rob "Knuckles" Passero – bass
- Roger Habel Jr. – drums
- Alan Mott – guitar for Demolition and Elvis Was Bigger Than the Beatles
- Michael "Rosie" Rosenthal – guitar for Elvis Was Bigger Than the Beatles

== Discography ==
=== EPs ===
- 1995 Duct Tape

=== Albums ===
- 1997 The Self-Titled Debut Album by superGARAGE
- 2000 Demolition
- 2002 Elvis Was Bigger Than the Beatles

=== Other appearances ===
- 2005 Songs from Degrassi: The Next Generation
- 2006 Tokyopop Presents: D-Sides
