= McLaren Furnace Room =

Studio album by The Watchmen
- Released: September 1992 (Canada); August 31, 1993 (Re-release)
- Recorded: July 1992
- Studios: Winfield Sound, Toronto, ON
- Genre: Rock
- Length: 51:37
- Label: MCA Records
- Producer: Chris Wardman

The Watchmen chronology
McLaren Furnace Room (1992)	In the Trees (1994)

Professional ratings
Review scores
Source	Rating
Allmusic	favorable

McLaren Furnace Room is the first major label album by Canadian band, The Watchmen. Originally released by SUMO Productions in Canada in 1992 (with the help of MCA Records), the release impressed MCA Records Canada who signed the band and released the album in 1993 on a much wider scale. The title of the album refers to the basement of the McLaren Hotel that served as the band's rehearsal studio.

The album was certified Gold in Canada by the Canadian Recording Industry Association on March 6, 1996.

Known as a tireless touring band, they reportedly played 150 shows a year across Canada from 1987 to 1991. A show in Toronto at the Horseshoe Tavern in 1991 caught the attention of producer Chris Wardman's girlfriend. She promised to put Wardman in touch with the band. Wardman eventually made it out to one of their shows and promised them a production commitment.

Jake Gold's The Management Trust signed them to a management deal and his music production outfit SUMO Productions. Using their clout with MCA Records, SUMO was able to release the band's debut McLaren Furnace Room in 1992. The band then signed directly to MCA Records Canada.

At that time in the band's history, the principal songwriter was guitarist Joey Serlin.

A video for the lead single "Cracked" was filmed and released in 1992 while a video for the second single "Run & Hide" was released in 1993. Both videos saw modest play on MuchMusic.

The album was named the winner of the Slaight Family Polaris Heritage Prize at the 2026 Polaris Music Prize gala.

== Track listing ==
All songs and lyrics written by Joey Serlin except for "Cracked" with music written by The Watchmen, and "Sleep", with lyrics by Danny Greaves and music by The Watchmen.

No.	Title	Length
1.	"Cracked"	4:00
2.	"Run & Hide"	3:41
3.	"Try It Sometime"	4:25
4.	"Sleep"	4:00
5.	"Must To Be Free"	4:42
6.	"Falling"	4:40
7.	"Mister"	3:49
8.	"Anything But That"	2:50
9.	"I'm Still Gone"	5:41
10.	"Soul Stealer"	4:56
11.	"Crazy Days"	4:40
12.	"Make You Go Down"	4:09

== Album credits ==
=== Personnel ===
- Sammy Kohn - Drums
- Pete Loewen - Bass & Vocals
- Joey Serlin - Guitars & Vocals
- Danny Greaves - Vocals & Mouth Organ

=== Additional personnel ===
- Jason Sniderman - Mellotron on "Must To Be Free"
- Lazyman lefty - Congas
- Kroo-b - Piano
- Chris Wardman - Dragon Noises

=== Production ===
- Chris Wardman - Producer, Mixer
- Earl Torno - Mixer, Engineer
- Eric Apps - Engineer, Assistant Engineer
- Mike Gurarie - Assistant Engineer
- Recorded & Mixed at Winfield Sound, Toronto
- Mastered by Howie Wienberg at Masterdisk, New York
