= Distorted Lullabies =

Studio album by Ours
- Released: May 15, 2001
- Genre: Alternative rock, art rock
- Label: DreamWorks
- Producer: Steve Lillywhite

Ours chronology
Sour (1994)	Distorted Lullabies (2001)	Precious (2002)

Singles from Distorted Lullabies
- 1. "Sometimes" Released: 2001; 2. "Drowning" Released: 2001

Professional ratings
Review scores
Source	Rating
AllMusic	4.5/5 stars
Rolling Stone	3/5 stars

Distorted Lullabies is the band Ours' first official album. Released on the DreamWorks label on May 15, 2001, it is largely composed of melodic rock songs. The single "Sometimes" found moderate success with MTV and many modern rock radio stations.

== Track listing ==
1. "Fallen Souls"
2. "Drowning"
3. "I'm a Monster"
4. "Sometimes"
5. "Miseryhead"
6. "Here Is the Light"
7. "Medication"
8. "Dancing Alone"
9. "Bleed"
10. "Dizzy"
11. "Meet Me in the Tower"
12. "As I Wander"
