= The Watchmen (band) =

Canadian rock band

- Origin: Winnipeg, Manitoba, Canada
- Genres: Rock, alternative rock
- Years active: 1988–2003, 2008–present
- Labels: MCA (1991–1996), EMI (1997–2002)
- Members: Daniel Greaves; Joey Serlin; Ken Tizzard; Sammy Kohn
- Past members: Pete Loewen; Grant Page

The Watchmen are a Canadian rock band. They were one of the most commercially successful bands in Canada in the mid to late 1990s. During their peak years, the band had one platinum record (In the Trees) and three more gold records (McLaren Furnace Room, Silent Radar, and Slomotion). The band has toured Canada a number of times, were the opening act for The Tragically Hip, and co-headlined a national tour with Big Wreck.

== History ==
The Watchmen first came together in Winnipeg, Manitoba in 1988. Founding members were Daniel Greaves, Joey Serlin, Sammy Kohn, and Pete Loewen. After performing together for several years, they released their debut album, McLaren Furnace Room, in 1992.

In 1994, Loewen left the band and was replaced by Ken Tizzard. That same year, the band released their second album, In the Trees. The album was certified Platinum in Canada and is the band's most successful album to date.

The band released the albums Brand New Day and Silent Radar in 1996 and 1998, respectively.

In 1999, the band performed as part of Humble & Fred Fest at Fort York in Toronto. Kohn had left the band when they recorded their 2001 album Slomotion; the percussion tracks were created electronically. A single from the album, "Absolutely Anytime" was in the Top Ten on the Canadian charts for several weeks. While touring to support the album, the band took on drummer Ryan Ahoff.

In 2003, the Watchmen announced their farewell tour and their intention to disband. They returned to Winnipeg to perform at a fundraiser for the Israel national bobsleigh team.

In 2010, the Watchmen came together for a reunion show at the Horseshoe Tavern in Toronto. They have since continued to perform occasional shows across Canada. In May 2023, Daniel Greaves and Joey Serlin (working as Serlin Greaves) released an album entitled Sad Songs For Sale.

The Watchmen are members of the Canadian charity Artists Against Racism.

Their debut album, McLaren Furnace Room, was named the winner of the Slaight Family Polaris Heritage Prize at the 2026 Polaris Music Prize gala.

In November 2026, The Watchmen released a new song titled "Gasoline." It is their first new single in 24 years.

== Discography ==
=== Studio albums ===
Year	Title	Peak chart positions		Certifications
Year	Title	CAN	AUS	CAN
1992	McLaren Furnace Room	–	–	Gold
1994	In the Trees	32	–	Platinum
1996	Brand New Day	37	–	
1998	Silent Radar	28	68	Gold
2001	Slomotion	6	–	Gold

=== Live albums ===
- Live Radar (1998)
- Last Road Trip Download Series (2004)
- Live and in Stereo (2017)

=== Singles ===
Year	Title	Peak Chart Position				Album
Year	Title	CAN	CAN Alt	CAN Content (Cancon)	AUS	Album
1992	"Cracked"	87	–	2	–	McLaren Furnace Room
1992	"Run and Hide"	–	–	–	–	McLaren Furnace Room
1993	"Must to Be Free"	–	–	8	–	McLaren Furnace Room
1994	"Boneyard Tree"	29	–	–	–	In the Trees
1994	"Wiser"	74	–	–	–	In the Trees
1994	"All Uncovered"	23	–	5	–	In the Trees
1995	"Lusitana"	65	–	–	–	In the Trees
1996	"Incarnate"	26	10	–	–	Brand New Day
1996	"Shut Up"	48	–	–	–	Brand New Day
1996	"Zoom"	–	24	–	–	Brand New Day
1998	"Stereo"	–	5	–	51	Silent Radar
1998	"Any Day Now"	39	3	–	–	Silent Radar
1998	"Say Something"	45	–	–	–	Silent Radar
1999	"Brighter Hell"	–	–	–	–	Silent Radar
2001	"Absolutely Anytime"	–	–	–	–	Slomotion
2002	"Holiday (Slow It Down)"	–	–	–	–	Slomotion
2002	"Slomotion"	–	–	–	–	Slomotion
