= Ours (band) =

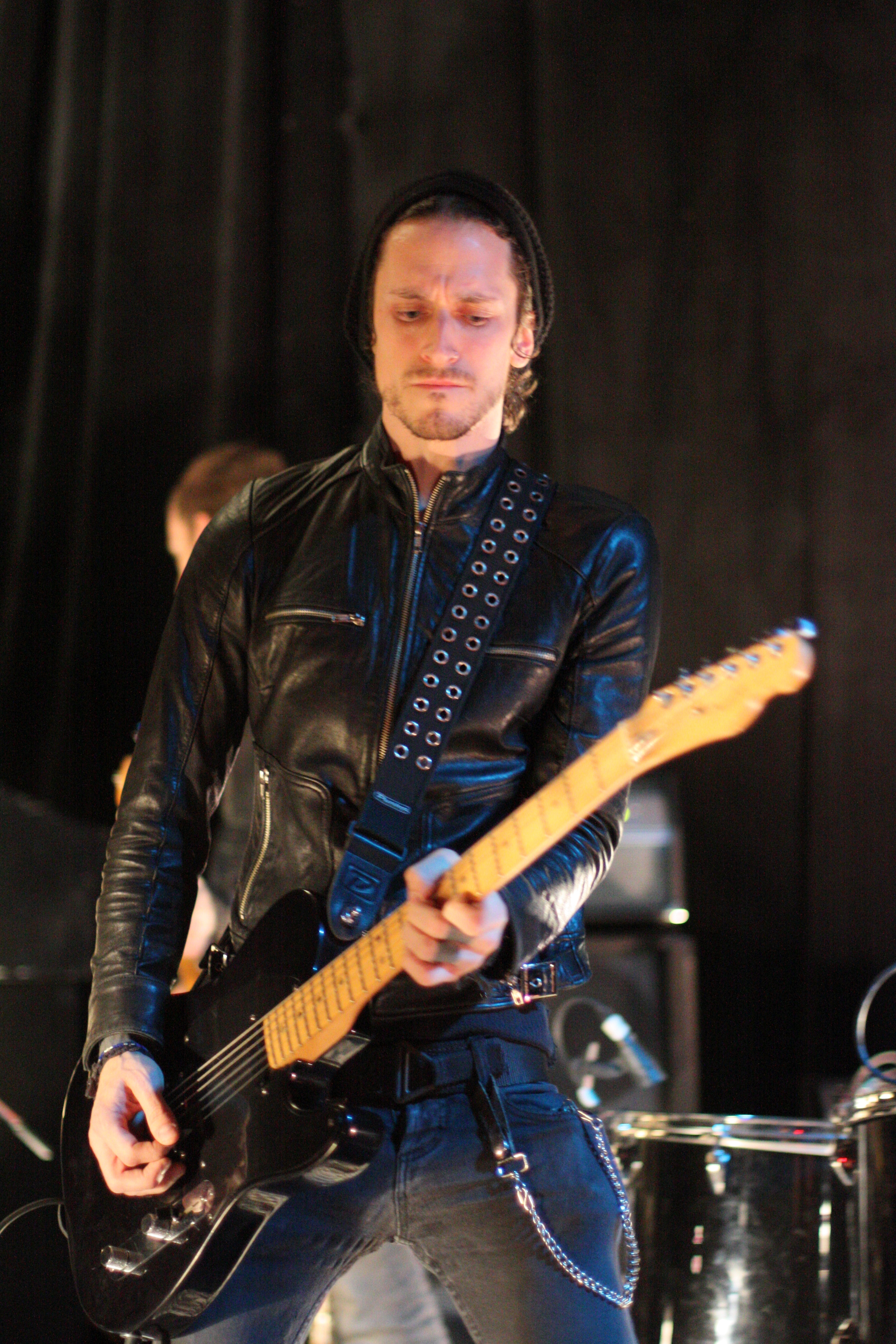
- Ours

Background information
- Origin: New Jersey, United States
- Genres: Alternative rock, progressive rock, art rock
- Years active: 1994–present
- Labels: Independent; DreamWorks; American Recordings
- Website: www.ours.net

Ours is an American rock band formed by singer, songwriter, and multi-instrumentalist Jimmy Gnecco. Since the band's formation in 1994, Gnecco has been the sole permanent member with a rotating lineup of supporting musicians. Their music has been described as alternative rock, progressive rock, and art rock. The band's emotionally intense and anthemic approach has drawn comparisons to U2 and Jeff Buckley.

Ours released their first album, Sour, in 1994. Ours signed to DreamWorks Records in 1997 and released their major label debut, Distorted Lullabies, in 2001. A second album, Precious, followed in 2002, but after DreamWorks folded, the band passed through several major labels before releasing their third album, Mercy through Rick Rubin's American Recordings in 2008. After a five-year hiatus, Ours independently released Ballet the Boxer 1 (2013), New Age Heroine II (2018), and a self-titled album (2021), completing a planned trilogy. The band has toured with acts including The Wallflowers, Marilyn Manson, A-ha, and Lana Del Rey.

== History ==
=== 1988–1997: Early years and formation ===
Gnecco began playing guitar at thirteen and formed his first band, Lost Child, in 1988 while still in high school. He later played in a group called the Harmony Bandits, which he eventually renamed Ours. In 1994, the band released a demo album titled Sour on the independent label Beatnik Records, owned by Mike Marri. Gnecco has since distanced himself from the recording, saying he was too young and that the lineup on Sour "is not Ours." The band dissolved shortly after, and Gnecco spent the next several years writing new material and assembling new musicians.

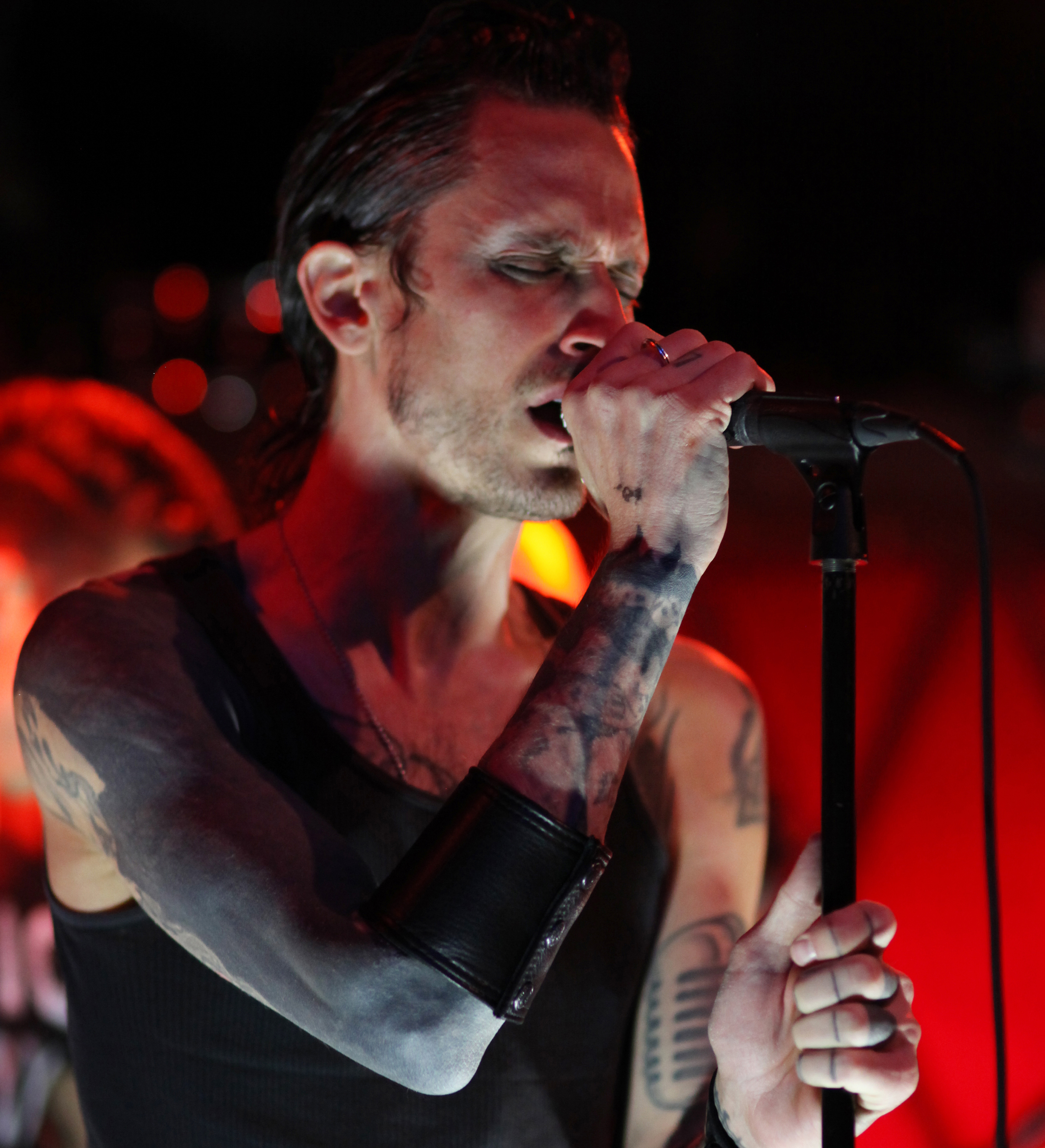
Gnecco in November 2014.

=== 1997-2005: Distorted Lullabies and Precious ===
In 1997, Gnecco reformed Ours and attracted a bidding war among record labels, ultimately signing with DreamWorks Records. Distorted Lullabies was released in 2001. Produced by Steve Lillywhite, the album led to tours with acts such as The Cult, Pete Yorn, and Ocean Colour Scene. The single "Sometimes" peaked at No. 31 on the Billboard Modern Rock charts and received moderate MTV airplay. The album drew comparisons to U2, Jeff Buckley, Radiohead, and the Cure.

In a 2008 interview with Westword, Gnecco stated the label was chosen for what he perceived as its commitment to artist development, but that the recording process was prolonged by conflicts with an A&R representative who micromanaged the project.

The band's second album, Precious, produced by Ethan Johns, followed in 2002. However, the band was rushed into the studio and the album was released before Gnecco considered it finished. DreamWorks largely abandoned promotion of the album.

The band toured as an opening act for The Wallflowers and Marilyn Manson. The Manson tour proved difficult, with the band facing hostile audiences nightly. DreamWorks' music division folded in 2005, leaving Ours without a label.

=== 2004–2008: Mercy ===
Following the closure of DreamWorks, Ours spent several years in transition between major labels. The band was initially absorbed into Geffen Records, where the label's president Polly Anthony supported the band and provided funding to record with Rick Rubin, who had expressed interest in working with Gnecco years earlier. However, by the time the album was completed, Geffen had changed leadership and shifted towards a pop-oriented roster. Ours were subsequently passed to Interscope, which released the band from its contract. Rubin then signed Ours to his American Recordings imprint, distributed through Columbia.

The resulting album, Mercy (Dancing for the Death of an Imaginary Enemy), was released in April 2008, marking a six-year gap since Precious. The band relocated from New Jersey to Los Angeles during the recording process. Gnecco has described the album as a personal milestone, stating, "Even though we had more success with Distorted Lullabies, Mercy was way more successful to me because I felt like the songs got to where I wanted them to be."

=== 2010–present: Independence ===
In 2010, Gnecco released a solo acoustic album, The Heart, on the independent label Bright Antenna, followed by a full-band version, The Heart: X Edition, in 2011.

Returning to Ours, the band launched a PledgeMusic campaign in 2012 to fund a new album, surpassing their fundraising goal. The resulting album, Ballet the Boxer 1, was released in 2013 as the first installment of a planned trilogy. In 2014, Ours supported Lana Del Rey on tour.

The second chapter, New Age Heroine II, followed in 2018. The trilogy concluded with a self-titled album released in May 2021, coinciding with the twentieth anniversary of Distorted Lullabies. Ours have continued to release music independently, releasing Rocket's Red Glare in 2025. In 2026, Gnecco began performing solo acoustic dates in the US and Europe to celebrate the anniversary of Distorted Lullabies.

== Band members ==
Current members

- Jimmy Gnecco – lead vocals, guitars, piano, keyboards, drums, backing vocals
- April Bauer – piano, keyboards, backing vocals
- Chris Iasiello – drums, backing vocals
- Mikey Iasiello – guitars, backing vocals
- Carmelo Risquet – bass

Former members

- Vinnie "Static" Sgro – guitar
- Chris Goodlof – bass
- R. "Race" Solomine – guitar, bass, keyboards
- Richie "Locke" Devletian – guitar, keyboards, percussion
- Dave Milone – guitar
- James Bray – bass, guitar, keyboards
- Chris "Pit" Gnecco – drums
- Anthony De Marco – keyboards
- Mike Marri – drums
- Kirk Jan – drums
- Darrin Verpeut – drums
- Zambia Greene – drums
- Ethan Johns – drums

== Discography ==
=== Studio albums ===
- Distorted Lullabies (2001)
- Precious (2002)
- Mercy (Dancing for the Death of an Imaginary Enemy) (2008)
- Ballet the Boxer 1 (2013)
- New Age Heroine II (2018)
- Ours (2021)
- Rocket's Red Glare (2025)

=== Extended plays ===
- Media Age (2020)
- The Bella Fall (2021)
- Right Here Right Now (2021)

=== Demo albums ===
- Sour (1994)

=== Singles ===
- "Sometimes" (2001)
- "Drowning" (2001)
- "Leaves" (2002)
- "The Worst Things Beautiful" (2008)
- "Devil" (2013)
- "Pretty Pain" (2019)
- "Slipping Away" (2019)
- "New Age Heroine" (2019)
- "Wounds of Love" (2019)
- "Don't Wanna Be A Star" (2020)
