= The Velvet Teen =

American indie rock band

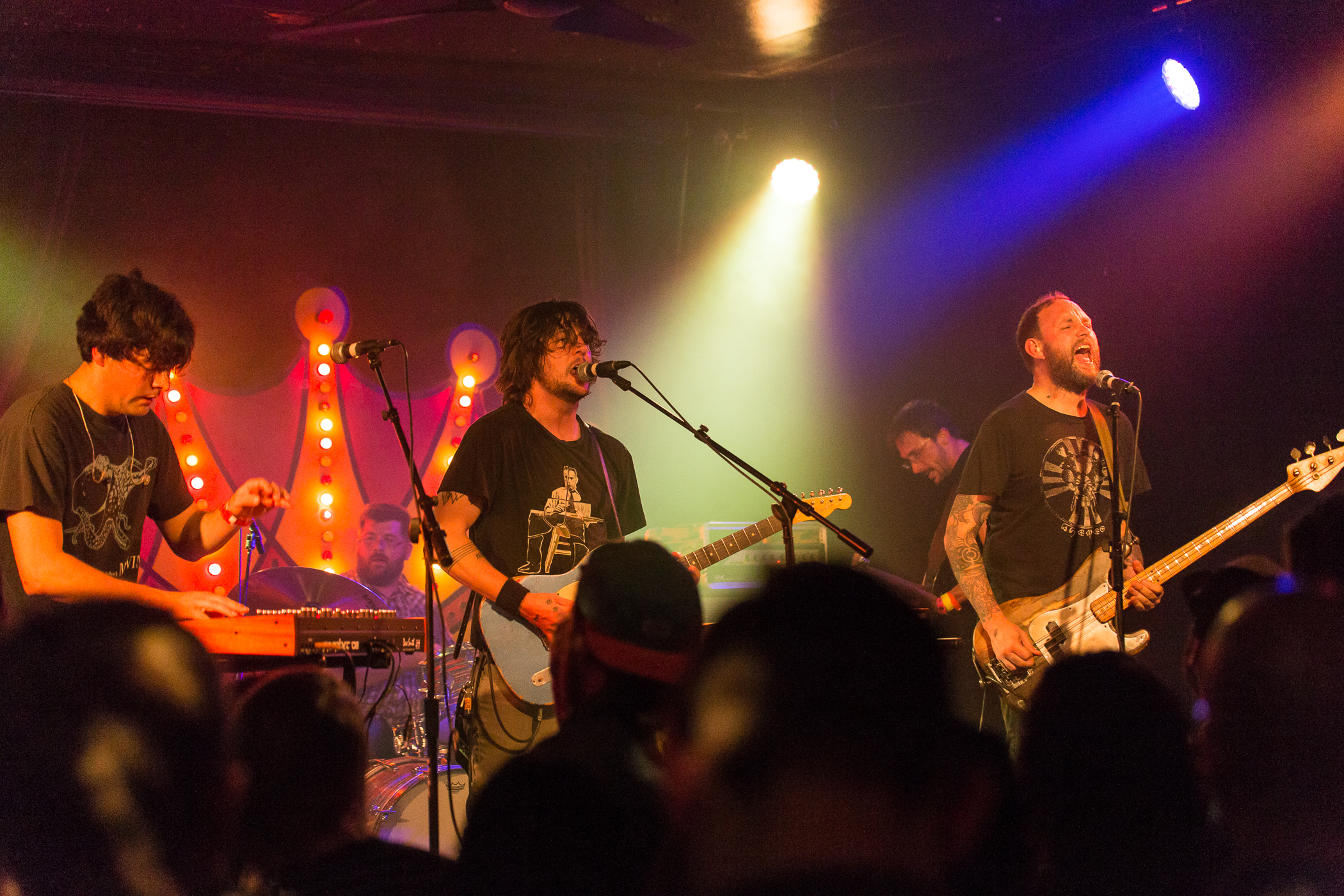
- The Velvet Teen performing in 2015

Background information
- Origin: Santa Rosa, California, U.S.
- Genres: Alternative rock; indie rock
- Years active: 2000–present
- Labels: Topshelf; Slowdance; Side With Us; Pandacide
- Members: Judah Nagler; Josh Staples; Casey Deitz
- Past members: Logan Whitehurst; Matthew Izen
- Website: thevelvetteen.com

The Velvet Teen is an American independent rock trio from Sonoma County, California.

== History ==
The Velvet Teen is originally the name of Judah Nagler's electronic solo project, whose official debut was made during a brief Icelandic tour that began on New Year's Eve, 1999. In 2000, during which Nagler and Logan Whitehurst were members of the band Little Tin Frog, the two began meeting in secret to write songs together under the moniker, 'The Secret Band.' When Little Tin Frog disbanded later that year, Nagler and Whitehurst continued their project and adopted Nagler's solo title, the Velvet Teen. They recorded and released Comasynthesis, a 6-song EP. In 2001, they were joined by bassist/vocalist Josh Staples and recorded their second EP, The Great Beast February.

The Velvet Teen signed to Slowdance Records, an independent record label from Portland, OR. They enlisted Death Cab for Cutie's Chris Walla to produce their first full-length album, Out of the Fierce Parade. Whitehurst, who was also an accomplished artist, created the etchings used as the album's artwork. Two music videos from the album ("Radiapathy" and "The Prize Fighter") were made and aired on MTV2.

Their second full-length album, Elysium, is a stylistic departure from their previous work, and does not contain any guitar. With a core instrumentation of drums, bass, and piano, other noteworthy elements include string and horn arrangements arranged by Adam Theis, the electronic glitches of "Satre Ringo", and the 12-minute, 1089-word epic "Chimera Obscurant." Elysium was recorded on a laptop by Judah and his brother Ephriam Nagler at various locations in Sonoma County, and mixed at Kingsize Soundlabs in Los Angeles by Dave Trumfio and Mike Krassner.

Several months before the release of Elysium, Whitehurst fell ill, was diagnosed with brain cancer, and subsequently left the band to focus on treatment. Casey Deitz was recruited as the new drummer after filling in for multiple shows.

The band recorded and released their third album, Cum Laude!, again with Judah and Ephriam producing and engineering. Cum Laude! was another stylistic departure and features an IDM-influenced, progressive rock sound that was louder, faster, and livelier than any of their previous work. The music video for "Tokyoto" was directed and edited by Nagler, and is the only music video from Cum Laude!. They supported the album on Minus the Bear's 2006 tour with P.O.S and Russian Circles.

Upon finishing the tour, Staples quit the band. On December 3, 2006, original drummer Logan Whitehurst died at his home in Los Banos, CA after a long battle with cancer.

On February 28, 2007, Nagler posted a message on the Velvet Teen's official website confirming that the band would continue. They performed and toured nationally with a new line-up in the fall of 2007; Nagler on bass/keys/vocals, Deitz on drums/vocals, and Matthew Izen of Polar Bears, formerly of The New Trust, on guitar.

In the spring of 2009, Josh Staples rejoined the band, and the Velvet Teen performed as a quartet in San Jose, CA. The first and only recording with this line-up, a four-song EP titled No Star, was recorded by Chris Manning at Fantasy Studios in Berkeley, CA, and Salamander Sound in San Rafael, CA. The recording was first self-released on CD and sold on their Japanese tour in October 2010 with The New Trust. It was released digitally on November 11, 2010, and physically (12" co-release with Side With Us/Makeyousick Records) on January 7, 2011, at the band's 12"/CD release show at Bottom of the Hill in San Francisco. A video for the song "No Star," directed by Mike Sloat, was released on February 19, 2011.

On August 9, 2012, (days after Izen announced he was no longer in the band) the Velvet Teen announced they would be recording their next full-length album in early September. Steve Choi (Rx Bandits, Peace'd Out) and Roger Camero (No Motiv, Peace'd Out) recorded and co-produced the album. On September 20, 2012, the band announced on their website, "Nearly all of the tracking is finished for our upcoming full length. Title and release details are currently being determined. 11 songs. All new material. Oh, and it RULES."

On April 1, 2014, the band updated their official website with artwork for the album by Young and Sick, and new information about the release of the album in 2014.

The Velvet Teen released the album All Is Illusory on June 30, 2015.

== Discography ==
=== LPs ===
- Out of the Fierce Parade (March 19, 2002)
- Elysium (July 20, 2004)
- Cum Laude! (July 25, 2006)
- All Is Illusory (June 30, 2015)

=== Singles & EPs ===
- Comasynthesis EP (March 2000)
  1. "Your Cell"
  2. "Super Me"
  3. "Never Happy"
  4. "Milo 7"
  5. "Penning the Penultimate"
  6. "Reverie to Chanticleer"
- The Great Beast February EP (February 2001)
  1. "Naked Girl"
  2. "Counting Backwards"
  3. "Mother of Love"
- Immortality EP (December 2001)
  1. "Stay with Me"
  2. "Weddings and Wakes"
  3. "Heaven"
  4. "No One Will Ever Love You" (The Magnetic Fields cover)
- The Velvet Teen/Sin in Space Split 7" (September 2004)
  1. "Code Red" – The Velvet Teen
  2. "Go!" – The Velvet Teen (Tones on Tail cover)
  3. "Extraterrestrial" – Sin In Space
  4. "Do You Love Me Now?" – Sin in Space (The Breeders cover)
- GyzmKid EP (May 9, 2006)
  1. "GyzmKid"
  2. "Spin the Wink" (Little Cat Remix)
  3. "False Profits" (Cute Version)
- No Star (November 11, 2010)
  1. "No Star"
  2. "Forfor"
  3. "Fixing a Faucet"
  4. "Pavlovian Bell"

=== Imports and re-releases ===
- Plus, Minus, Equals (The Great Beast February and Comasynthesis) (July 16, 2002)
  - Combines The Great Beast February EP and Comasynthesis EP onto one CD
- Out of the Fierce Parade (Japanese version) (June 4, 2003)
  - Includes the bonus tracks "Naked Girl," "Counting Backwards," "Mother of Love," "Your Cell," and "Code Red"
- Elysium (Japanese version) (May 22, 2004)
  - Includes a bonus DVD featuring music videos for "Radiapathy" and "The Prize Fighter," as well as a making-of "The Prize Fighter" video documentary
- Secrets Safe, A Buried Box (Japanese only compilation CD) (October 29, 2004)
  - Collects the Immortality EP and unreleased tracks
- Elysium (limited double 10" vinyl) (June 16, 2005)
  - Limited edition pressing includes the bonus track "No One Gets the Best of Me"
- Cum Laude! (Japanese version) (June 28, 2006)
  - Includes the bonus tracks "No One Gets the Best of Me," "Spin the Wink" (Little Cat Remix), and "False Profits" (Cute Version)
- The Great Beast February / Immortality (20th anniversary edition) (January 3, 2022)
  - Vinyl reissue of EPs The Great Beast February and Immortality; pressed on orange-colored vinyl
