= Dancing for the Death of an Imaginary Enemy =

Mercy (Dancing for the Death of an Imaginary Enemy)

Studio album by Ours
- Released: April 15, 2008
- Recorded: April 2005 – December 2006
- Genre: Alternative rock, art rock
- Length: 59:46
- Label: American Recordings
- Producer: Rick Rubin

Ours chronology
Precious (2002)	Mercy (Dancing for the Death of an Imaginary Enemy) (2008)	Ballet the Boxer 1 (2013)

Professional ratings
Review scores
Source	Rating
ARTISTdirect	3/5 stars
Blogcritics	3.5/5 stars
PopMatters	5/10 stars
Sputnikmusic	3.5/5 stars

Mercy (Dancing for the Death of an Imaginary Enemy) is the band Ours' third major label release. The album was recorded with renowned record producer Rick Rubin over several years, and was released on April 15, 2008. Music videos have been made for "Live Again", "God Only Wants You", and "The Worst Things Beautiful". Also, "Murder" has been background music for a commercial for CSI.

"Ran Away to Tell the World" was featured in the second part of the NCIS backdoor pilot episode for NCIS Los Angeles.

The album leaked to the internet on March 7, 2008.

== Track listing ==
1. "Mercy" - 6:41
2. "The Worst Things Beautiful" - 4:21
3. "Ran Away to Tell the World" - 5:00
4. "Black" - 4:51
5. "Moth" - 4:34
6. "Murder" - 5:35
7. "God Only Wants You" - 4:23
8. "Live Again" - 4:27
9. "Willing" - 4:41
10. "Saint" - 5:06
11. "Lost" - 5:18
12. "Get Up" - 4:50

Engineers: Peter Katis & Jon Berman

Recorded at: The Mansion

Mixers: Jonathan Florencio, Tim Palmer

Mastered by: Ted Jensen
