= Daniel Greaves (musician) =

Canadian musician (born 1970)

- Born: 1 December 1970 (age 55)
- Origin: Winnipeg, Manitoba, Canada
- Genre: Rock
- Occupations: Vocalist, songwriter, producer
- Instruments: Vocals, piano
- Years active: 1988–present

Daniel Greaves (born 1 December 1970) is a Canadian rock vocalist and songwriter. He is known as the founder and lead singer of the band The Watchmen, and for his a capella singing.

== Career ==
=== The Watchmen ===
In 1988, Greaves became the lead singer of The Watchmen, which he co-formed with Joey Serlin, Sammy Kohn and Pete Loewen. The Watchmen were a successful alternative rock band most active in the 1990s. Greaves also played keyboards and harmonica in the band. Between 1992 and 2001, they released six records internationally, toured extensively and built a substantial fan base in Canada and Australia. Each of their album releases achieved either gold or platinum status in Canada.

In 2003, the band members decided to separate and explore different opportunities individually, but still continue to perform with each other from time to time. Since the 2003 split, Greaves has worked with former Watchmen bandmate Ken Tizzard in the duo Audio Playground High + Wide. Tizzard and Greaves performed in a series of live visual music presentations at venues such as Ted's Wrecking Yard and the Berkley Church. The Watchmen reunited several years after their split, and they continue to play regular concerts across Canada.

=== Doctor ===
After leaving The Watchmen, Greaves founded the band Doctor with bassist Rob Higgins, a former member of Change of Heart.

The duo was joined in studio by guitarist Jamie Edwards and drummer Dan Cornelius to record the band's debut album, High Is As High Gets, which was licensed on SUMO Music and released in 2004. The four musicians also began touring following the album's release, with Carmen Lamont occasionally filling in for Edwards on guitar. Doctor broke up in 2005.

=== Serlin Greaves ===
Joey Serlin and Daniel Greaves of The Watchmen released an album as a duo, Sad Songs For Sale, on May 28, 2021. Greaves describes the album as "songs... that will remind fans of their old music".

== Film and television ==
In between performing and recording with his bands, Greaves worked on a number of film and television projects. He was the music supervisor, composer, and audio mixer for the 2000 film, Kanadiana (featured in the Montreal World Film Festival), the 2002 feature film, The Risen (starring Alberta Watson and Eugene Lipinski), Trevor Cunningham's 2003 feature film The Pedestrian, and director Brett Blackwell's 2010 film, Happiness is Hate Therapy, which originally aired on Bravo!.

Later, The Watchmen tracks, The South and Sleep, were included on the soundtrack of the 2010 TIFF selected film The Whistleblower.

Greaves provided original music for MTV's 2002 Everybody’s Doing It. His music can also be heard on regularly on CSI (CTV), Divine Design with Candice Olson (HGTV), and Take it Outside (HGTV).

== Other work and appearances ==
In 2005, Greaves contributed vocals to the track "This Longing" on the Neverending White Lights debut CD Act 1: Goodbye Friends of the Heavenly Bodies. In 2006, he contributed to Winnipeg producer Darcy Ataman's new tune "A Song for Africa" which was a benefit project to raise funds for African AIDS relief. In 2006, he composed the soundtrack to a new drinking and driving commercial commissioned by Saskatchewan Government Insurance (SGI).

Greaves has also been heard on the CBC Music radio network, as a fill-in host and as Saturday host of Weekend Mornings in 2021 and 2022.

== Personal life ==
Greaves rarely spoke about his racial identity during the height of the Watchmen's career; however, in 2020, amid the global reckoning around racism that followed the murder of George Floyd, he wrote a first-person essay for CBC Radio reflecting on how his upbringing as the son of a Black Canadian father and a Jewish mother had shaped him.

Greaves is a partner in Toronto's Lakeview Restaurant with Fadi Hakim. In late 2010, the restaurant company opened a coffee shop called The Abbott in Toronto's Parkdale. He and his wife Lisa also own The Motel Bar in Parkdale.

His brother, David Greaves, who has dual Canadian-Israeli citizenship, is a member of the Israeli Bobsled Team.

== Discography ==
=== The Watchmen Discography ===
- 1992 – McLaren Furnace Room
- 1994 – In the Trees
- 1996 – Brand New Day
- 1998 – Silent Radar, Live Radar
- 2001 – Slomotion (double CD)
- 2004 - Last Road Trip Download Series

=== Doctor Discography ===
- 2004 - High Is As High Gets

Track listing:

1. "What Makes You Think He's Lucky" (3:07)
2. "Get Your Own War" (3:29)
3. "Balancing" (3:23)
4. "Sweet U" (4:50)
5. "What Of It" (3:18)
6. "Weight" (2:57)
7. "It Don't Mean A Thing" (3:39)
8. "High Is As High Gets" (4:25)
9. "You're Not Giving At All And I'm Not Getting Past It" (4:37)
10. "Living The Dream" (3:58)
11. "You Saved Me" (3:16)
12. "Me And Nick Drake" (4:10)

=== Serlin Greaves Discography ===
- 2021 – Sad Songs For Sale
- Track Listing:
- 1. Passenger Happiness
- 2.Teenage Heart
- 3. Love You Less
- 4. Shooting Movies
- 5. Seasick
- 6. At Home
- 7. Porch Light
- 8. Metal
- 9. Locked Up
- 10. Radiator
- 11. 2 Days

== Filmography ==
- 2000 - Kanadiana
- 2002 - The Risen
- 2002 - Everybody’s Doing It (TV)
- 2003 - The Pedestrian.
- 2010 - Happiness is Hate Therapy
