= Joey Serlin =

Canadian rock guitarist and songwriter (born 1970)

- Born: 1970 (age 55–56)
- Genres: Rock
- Occupations: Guitarist, songwriter
- Instrument: Guitar

Joey Serlin (born 1970) is a Canadian rock guitarist and songwriter.

He is a member of The Watchmen, a Canadian alternative rock band that was prominent during the 1990s. Following that band's breakup in 2003, (prior to its 2009 reunion) he worked with Canadian Idol winners Ryan Malcolm and Kalan Porter, and formed the band Redline with Watchmen touring drummer Ryan Ahoff and Headstones bassist Tim White, although that band broke up in 2005. He has scored both short and feature films, as well as composing music for major video games.

Serlin is partner, composer and director for Vapor music, an award-winning audio house with offices in Toronto, Vancouver, Chicago, and San Francisco. While at Vapor, Serlin has composed music for international commercials for brands such as Budweiser, Coke, Nintendo, GM, Nissan, and Chrysler.

The Watchmen reunited in September 2009 for select shows and have since continued to tour and work on new material. They have released a live album, Live And in Stereo, in addition to deluxe releases of prior albums.

In May 2023, Serlin and Daniel Greaves of The Watchmen (working as Serlin Greaves) released an album entitled Sad Songs For Sale.
