= The Wombats discography =

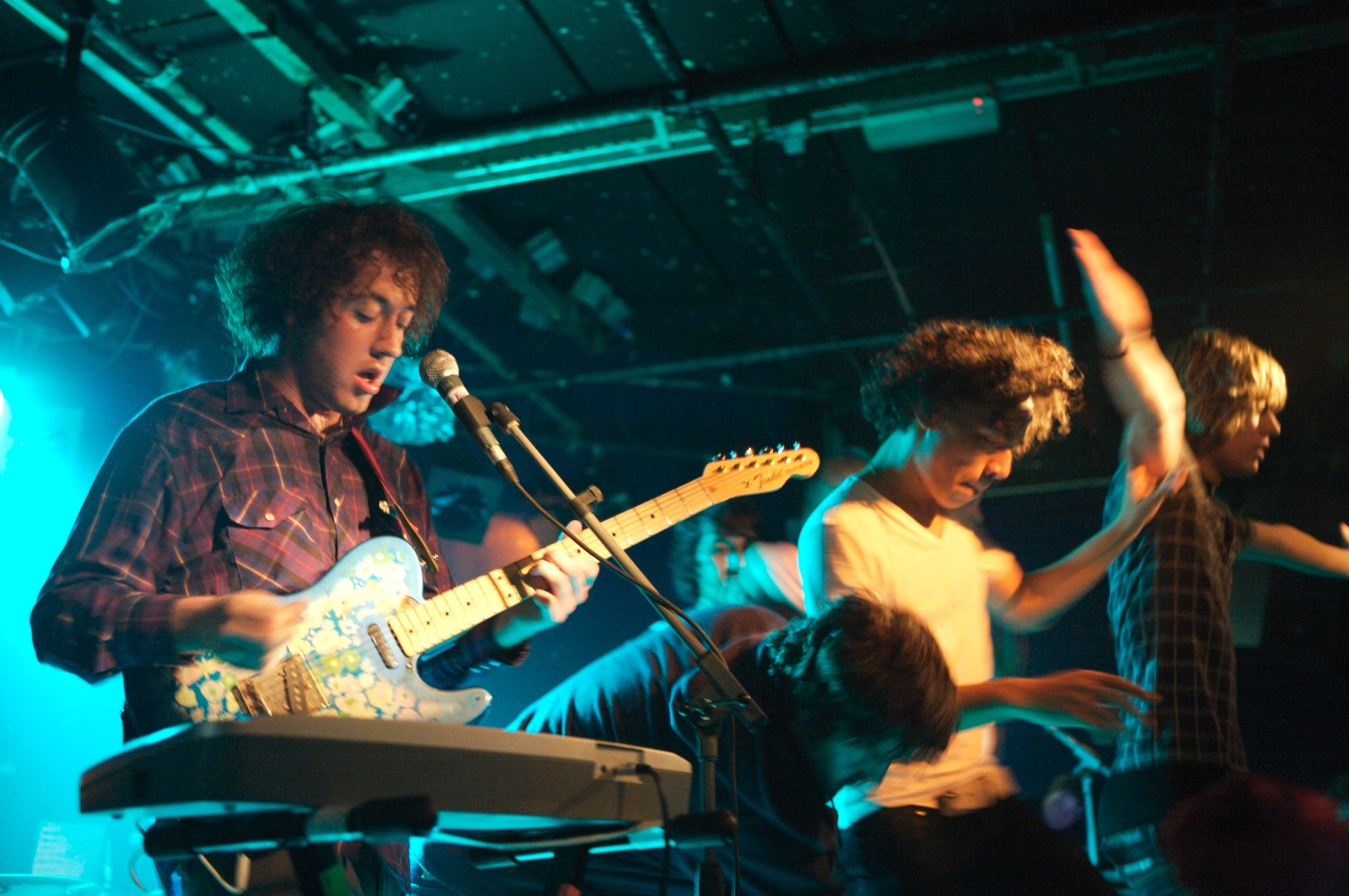
- The Wombats
- Studio albums: 7
- Extended plays: 10
- Compilation albums: 1
- Singles: 34
- Music videos: 22

The discography of the Wombats, a Liverpool-based indie rock group, consists of seven studio albums, ten extended plays and thirty-four singles.

== Albums ==
=== Studio albums ===
List of albums, with selected chart positions, sales, and certifications
Title	Details	Peak chart positions										Certifications
Title	Details	UK	AUS	AUT	BEL (FL)	GER	NLD	NOR	SCO	SWI	US	Certifications
Girls, Boys and Marsupials	Released: 20 September 2006, Japan only; Label: 14th Floor; Formats: CD	—	—	—	—	—	—	—	—	—	—	
A Guide to Love, Loss & Desperation	Released: 5 November 2007; Label: 14th Floor; Formats: CD, digital download	11	35	—	—	—	57	—	16	—	— (Note: A Guide to Love, Loss & Desperation did not enter the US Billboard 200, but peaked at number 20 on the US Heatseekers Albums Chart.)	BPI: Platinum; ARIA: Gold
This Modern Glitch	Released: 25 April 2011; Label: 14th Floor; Formats: CD, vinyl, digital download	3	2	38	93	24	31	14	5	33	— (Note: This Modern Glitch did not enter the US Billboard 200, but peaked at number 27 on the US Heatseekers Albums Chart.)	BPI: Gold; ARIA: Gold
Glitterbug	Released: 13 April 2015; Label: 14th Floor; Formats: CD, vinyl, digital download	5	2	62	151	30	89	—	10	74	91	BPI: Gold
Beautiful People Will Ruin Your Life	Released: 9 February 2018; Label: Kobalt Music Group; Formats: CD, vinyl, digital download	3	5	55	75	39	67	19	15	57	190	BPI: Gold
Fix Yourself, Not the World	Released: 14 January 2022; Label: AWAL; Formats: CD, vinyl, digital download, streaming	1	2	—	—	38	89	—	2	—	— (Note: Fix Yourself, Not the World did not enter the US Billboard 200, but peaked at number 51 on the US Top Current Albums Chart.)	
Oh! The Ocean	Released: 14 February 2025; Label: AWAL; Formats: CD, vinyl, digital download, streaming	4	12	—	—	—	—	—	7	—	—	
"—" denotes a release that did not chart or was not released in that territory.

=== Compilation albums ===
List of compilation albums, with selected details
Title	Details
B–Z Sides (2003–2017) (In Rough Chronological Order)	Released: 24 December 2019; Label: 14th Floor; Formats: Digital download, streaming

== Extended plays ==
List of extended plays with selected chart positions
Title	Details	Peak chart positions	
Title	Details	UK Sales	UK Indie
The Hangover Sessions	Released: 2004; Label: Self-released; Format: CD	—	—
The Daring Adventures of Sgt. Wimbo and His Pet Otter	Released: 2004; Label: Self-released; Format: CD	—	—
No. 3	Released: 2005; Label: Wimbartum; Format: CD	—	—
The Wombats	Released: 2005; Label: Wimbartum; Format: CD	—	—
The Wombats Go Pop! Pop! Pop!	Released: 13 May 2007; Label: 14th Floor; Formats: CD, digital download	—	—
The Wombats	Released: 8 April 2008; Label: KIDS in America; Formats: CD, digital download	—	—
This Acoustic Glitch	Released: 11 March 2011; Label: 14th Floor; Format: Digital download	—	—
Our Perfect Disease	Released: 5 August 2011; Label: 14th Floor; Format: Digital download	—	—
Glitterbug B-Sides	Released: 13 April 2015; Label: 14th Floor; Formats: CD, digital download	—	—
Is This What It Feels Like to Feel Like This?	Released: 18 November 2022; Label: AWAL; Formats: Vinyl, digital download	69	25
"—" denotes a release that did not chart or was not released in that territory.

== Singles ==
Single	Year	Peak chart positions										Certifications	Album
Single	Year	UK	AUS	CZR	EU	FIN	GER	JPN	NLD	SCO	US Rock	Certifications	Album
"Moving to New York"	2006	13	—	—	48	—	—	—	—	16	—	BPI: Platinum	A Guide to Love, Loss & Desperation
"Backfire at the Disco"	2007	40	—	—	—	—	—	—	—	14	—		A Guide to Love, Loss & Desperation
"Kill the Director"	2007	35	—	—	—	—	—	—	—	27	—	BPI: Platinum	A Guide to Love, Loss & Desperation
"Let's Dance to Joy Division"	2007	15	76	—	—	—	—	—	19	10	—	BPI: Platinum	A Guide to Love, Loss & Desperation
"Bleeding Love"	2008	—	—	—	—	—	—	—	—	—	—		Non-album singles
"Is This Christmas?"	2008	49	—	—	—	—	—	—	—	23	—		Non-album singles
"My Circuitboard City"	2009	69	—	—	—	—	—	—	—	22	—		Non-album singles
"Tokyo (Vampires & Wolves)"	2010	23	33	—	71	—	78	—	66	23	—	BPI: Silver; ARIA: Gold	This Modern Glitch
"Jump into the Fog"	2011	35	60	—	—	—	—	—	—	38	30		This Modern Glitch
"Anti-D"	2011	42	—	—	—	—	—	—	—	42	—		This Modern Glitch
"Techno Fan"	2011	60	54	—	—	—	—	23	—	55	—	BPI: Silver	This Modern Glitch
"Our Perfect Disease"	2011	—	—	—	—	—	—	—	—	—	—		This Modern Glitch
"1996"	2011	—	—	—	—	—	—	—	—	—	—		This Modern Glitch
"Your Body Is a Weapon"	2013	129	86	—	—	—	—	—	—	—	—		Glitterbug
"Greek Tragedy"	2015	158	61	64	—	97	—	—	—	—	47	BPI: Platinum; RIAA: Gold	Glitterbug
"Give Me a Try"	2015	163	—	—	—	—	—	—	—	—	— (Note: "Give Me a Try" did not enter the US Hot Rock & Alternative Songs chart, but peaked at number 27 on the US Rock & Alternative Airplay chart.)		Glitterbug
"Be Your Shadow"	2015	—	—	—	—	—	—	—	—	—	—		Glitterbug
"Emoticons"	2015	—	—	—	—	—	—	—	—	—	—		Glitterbug
"Lemon to a Knife Fight"	2017	—	—	—	—	—	—	—	—	—	—	BPI: Silver	Beautiful People Will Ruin Your Life
"Turn"	2017	—	—	—	—	—	—	—	—	—	— (Note: "Turn" did not enter the US Hot Rock & Alternative Songs chart, but peaked at number 36 on the US Alternative Airplay chart.)	BPI: Gold	Beautiful People Will Ruin Your Life
"Cheetah Tongue"	2018	—	—	—	—	—	—	—	—	—	—	BPI: Silver	Beautiful People Will Ruin Your Life
"Bee-Sting"	2018	— (Note: "Bee-Sting" did not enter the UK Singles Chart, but peaked at number 11 on the UK Physical Singles Chart.)	—	—	—	—	—	—	—	—	—		Beautiful People Will Ruin Your Life
"Oceans"	2018	—	—	—	—	—	—	—	—	—	—		Beautiful People Will Ruin Your Life
"Nothing to Love About Love" (with Peking Duk)	2020	—	—	—	—	—	—	—	—	—	—		Non-album single
"Method to the Madness"	2021	—	—	—	—	—	—	—	—	—	—		Fix Yourself, Not the World
"If You Ever Leave, I'm Coming with You"	2021	—	—	—	—	—	—	—	—	—	— (Note: "If You Ever Leave, I'm Coming with You" did not enter the US Hot Rock & Alternative Songs chart, but peaked at number 29 on the US Alternative Airplay chart.)		Fix Yourself, Not the World
"Ready for the High"	2021	—	—	—	—	—	—	—	—	—	—		Fix Yourself, Not the World
"Everything I Love Is Going to Die"	2021	—	—	25	—	—	—	—	—	—	—		Fix Yourself, Not the World
"I Think My Mind Has Made Its Mind Up"	2022	—	—	—	—	—	—	—	—	—	—		Is This What It Feels Like to Feel Like This?
"Dressed to Kill"	2022	—	—	—	—	—	—	—	—	—	—		Is This What It Feels Like to Feel Like This?
"Sorry I'm Late, I Didn't Want to Come"	2024	—	—	—	—	—	—	—	—	—	—		Oh! The Ocean
"Blood On the Hospital Floor"	2024	—	—	—	—	—	—	—	—	—	—		Oh! The Ocean
"My Head Is Not My Friend"	2024	—	—	—	—	—	—	—	—	—	—		Oh! The Ocean
"Can't Say No"	2025	—	—	—	—	—	—	—	—	—	—		Oh! The Ocean
"—" denotes single that did not chart or was not released.

=== Promotional singles ===
Single	Year	Peak chart positions	Album
Single	Year	UK Indie	Album
"Black Flamingo"	2018	34	Beautiful People Will Ruin Your Life
"This Car Drives All by Itself"	2022	—	Fix Yourself, Not the World
"Worry"	2022	—	Fix Yourself, Not the World
"Is This What It Feels Like to Feel Like This?"	2022	—	Is This What It Feels Like to Feel Like This?
"—" denotes single that did not chart or was not released.

=== Triple J Hottest 100 ===
The Triple J Hottest 100 is an annual music listener poll hosted by national Australian radio station, Triple J, to determine their favourite song of the year. Songs by The Wombats have appeared on numerous occasions.

Single	Year	Position
"Let's Dance to Joy Division"	2007	12
"Tokyo (Vampires & Wolves)"	2010	8
"Jump into the Fog"	2011	18
"1996"	2011	24
"Techno Fan"	2011	26
"Our Perfect Disease"	2011	94
"Let's Dance to Joy Division"	2012	74
"Your Body Is a Weapon"	2013	25
"Greek Tragedy"	2015	29
"Give Me a Try"	2015	67
"Be Your Shadow"	2015	91
"Lemon to a Knife Fight"	2017	22
"Turn"	2018	12
"Cheetah Tongue"	2018	69
"Tokyo (Vampires & Wolves)"	2010–2019	31
"Greek Tragedy"	2010–2019	86
"Nothing to Love About Love"	2020	50
"If You Ever Leave, I'm Coming with You"	2021	32

Album	Year	Position
This Modern Glitch	2011	4
Glitterbug	2015	9
Beautiful People Will Ruin Your Life	2018	8

== Other appearances ==
Title	Year	Album
"Moving to New York"	2008	Radio 1's Live Lounge – Volume 3
"There She Goes"	2009	Like a Version – Volume Five
"Anti-D"	2011	Radio 1's Live Lounge – Volume 6
"Do You Remember"	2015	Like a Version – Volume Eleven
"White Christmas"	2019	Like a Version – Volume Fifteen
