= Triple J's Hottest 100 of 2015 =

2016 compilation album of 2015 songs by Triple J

2015 Triple J Hottest 100

Countdown details
- Date of countdown: 26 January 2016
- Charity partner: Australian Indigenous Mentoring Experience
- Votes cast: 2,094,000

Countdown highlights
- Winning song: The Rubens "Hoops"
- Most entries: Tame Impala; Courtney Barnett (4 tracks)

Chronology
← Previous; 2014	Next → 2016

The 2015 Triple J Hottest 100 was announced on January 26, 2016. It is the 23rd countdown of the most popular songs of the year, as chosen by the listeners of Australian radio station Triple J.

Voting commenced on 9 December 2015, and closed on 22 January 2016. Voters nominated ten songs that were released between December 2014 and November 2015 and submitted them through the Triple J website. Over 2 million votes were again cast, this year from 172 countries. 54 songs in the 2015 Hottest 100 are by Australian artists, with 26 artists of any nationality making their debut.

Despite a betting agency's campaign aimed at getting Justin Bieber featured in the list, similar to 2014's #Tay4Hottest100, Triple J announced that no songs have been disqualified from the 2015 list.

== Full list ==
Note: Australian artists

#	Song	Artist	Country of origin
1	Hoops	The Rubens	Australia
2	King Kunta	Kendrick Lamar	United States
3	Lean On	Major Lazer and DJ Snake featuring MØ	United States/France/Denmark
4	The Less I Know the Better	Tame Impala	Australia
5	Let It Happen	Tame Impala	Australia
6	The Trouble with Us	Marcus Marr and Chet Faker	United Kingdom/Australia
7	Do You Remember	Jarryd James	Australia
8	The Buzz	Hermitude featuring Mataya and Young Tapz	Australia/New Zealand
9	Can't Feel My Face	The Weeknd	Canada
10	Magnets	Disclosure featuring Lorde	United Kingdom/New Zealand
11	Never Be	Meg Mac	Australia
12	You Were Right	Rüfüs	Australia
13	Ocean Drive	Duke Dumont	United Kingdom
14	Hotline Bling	Drake	Canada
15	Like Soda	Violent Soho	Australia
16	Fire and the Flood	Vance Joy	Australia
17	Middle	DJ Snake featuring Bipolar Sunshine	France/United Kingdom
18	Downtown	Macklemore & Ryan Lewis featuring Eric Nally, Melle Mel, Kool Moe Dee and Grandmaster Caz	United States
19	The Hills	The Weeknd	Canada
20	Mountain at My Gates	Foals	United Kingdom
21	Magnolia	Gang of Youths	Australia
22	Keeping Score	L D R U featuring Paige IV	Australia
23	Embracing Me	Safia	Australia
24	Some Minds	Flume featuring Andrew Wyatt	Australia/United States
25	Shine On	The Amity Affliction	Australia
26	I Know There's Gonna Be (Good Times)	Jamie xx featuring Young Thug and Popcaan	United Kingdom/United States/Jamaica
27	Young	Vallis Alps	Australia/United States
28	Like an Animal	Rüfüs	Australia
29	Greek Tragedy	The Wombats	United Kingdom
30	Say My Name	Peking Duk featuring Benjamin Joseph	Australia
31	Loud Places	Jamie xx featuring Romy	United Kingdom
32	Leave a Trace	Chvrches	United Kingdom
33	Long Loud Hours	Urthboy featuring Bertie Blackman	Australia
34	Eventually	Tame Impala	Australia
35	Counting Sheep	Safia	Australia
36	All My Friends	Snakehips featuring Tinashe and Chance the Rapper	United Kingdom/United States
37	Alright	Kendrick Lamar	United States
38	Delilah	Florence & the Machine	United Kingdom
39	Swear Jar	Illy	Australia
40	Ship to Wreck	Florence & the Machine	United Kingdom
41	Puppet Theatre	Claptone featuring Peter Bjorn & John	Germany/Sweden
42	Hold Me Down	Halsey	United States
43	Pedestrian at Best	Courtney Barnett	Australia
44	Something About You	Hayden James	Australia
45	Throne	Bring Me the Horizon	United Kingdom
46	Go	The Chemical Brothers	United Kingdom
47	Dynamite	Asta featuring Allday	Australia
48	Crushed	Parkway Drive	Australia
49	Too Much Time Together	San Cisco	Australia
50	Deception Bay	Boo Seeka	Australia
51	Clearest Blue	Chvrches	United Kingdom
52	Cream on Chrome	Ratatat	United States
53	Monday	Matt Corby	Australia
54	Working for It	Zhu, Skrillex and They	United States
55	Multi-Love	Unknown Mortal Orchestra	New Zealand/United States
56	Alive	Sia	Australia
57	Foolish	Alpine	Australia
58	Vice Grip	Parkway Drive	Australia
59	Run	Alison Wonderland	Australia
60	Kamikaze	MØ	Denmark
61	'Cause I'm a Man	Tame Impala	Australia
62	Omen	Disclosure featuring Sam Smith	United Kingdom
63	Walk the Wire	Boy & Bear	Australia
64	LSD	ASAP Rocky	United States
65	Don't Wanna Fight	Alabama Shakes	United States
66	M.O.B.	Tkay Maidza	Australia
67	Give Me a Try	The Wombats	United Kingdom
68	Shutdown	Skepta	United Kingdom
69	Forces	Japanese Wallpaper featuring Airling	Australia
70	What Kind of Man	Florence & the Machine	United Kingdom
71	Flesh Without Blood	Grimes	Canada
72	Anchor	Birds of Tokyo	Australia
73	Once	Ngaiire	Papua New Guinea/Australia
74	Powerful	Major Lazer featuring Ellie Goulding and Tarrus Riley	United States/United Kingdom/Jamaica
75	Elevator Operator	Courtney Barnett	Australia
76	Suddenly	British India	Australia
77	Lay Down	DMA's	Australia
78	Weathered	Jack Garratt	United Kingdom
79	Wolves	The Cat Empire	Australia
80	Everyday	ASAP Rocky featuring Rod Stewart, Miguel and Mark Ronson	United States/United Kingdom
81	Big Jet Plane (Like a Version)	Tuka	Australia
82	Depreston	Courtney Barnett	Australia
83	Down to Earth	Flight Facilities	Australia
84	Delete (Like a Version)	Sticky Fingers	Australia
85	Heart Attack	Flight Facilities featuring Owl Eyes	Australia
86	Happy Song	Bring Me the Horizon	United Kingdom
87	Begin Again	Purity Ring	Canada
88	Party Machine	The Bennies	Australia
89	High by the Beach	Lana Del Rey	United States
90	Gemini	What So Not featuring George Maple	Australia
91	Be Your Shadow	The Wombats	United Kingdom
92	No One	Golden Features featuring Thelma Plum	Australia
93	Indian Summer	Jai Wolf	United States
94	Ghost	Halsey	United States
95	Nobody Really Cares If You Don't Go to the Party	Courtney Barnett	Australia
96	Rumour Mill	Rudimental featuring Anne-Marie and Will Heard	United Kingdom
97	Twilight Driving	Methyl Ethel	Australia
98	Be Together	Major Lazer featuring Wild Belle	United States
99	True Friends	Bring Me the Horizon	United Kingdom
100	Hell Boy	Seth Sentry	Australia

=== #101–#200 List ===
On 31 January 2016, Triple J broadcast the second 100 songs of the countdown.

#	Song	Artist	Country of origin
101	Call My Name	Mosquito Coast	Australia
102	Distant Past	Everything Everything	United Kingdom
103	Innerbloom	Rüfüs	Australia
104	Breathe Life	Jack Garratt	United Kingdom
105	On Fire	Carmada featuring Maribelle	Australia
106	Pretty Pimpin	Kurt Vile	United States
107	Like You Want To	Kita Alexander	Australia
108	So Into You (Like a Version)	Childish Gambino	United States
109	40oz. on Repeat	Fidlar	United States
110	The Love Within	Bloc Party	United Kingdom
111	Dumb	Seth Sentry	Australia
112	Bend	Chet Faker	Australia
113	U Dont Know	Alison Wonderland featuring Wayne Coyne	Australia/United States
114	Dead Fox	Courtney Barnett	Australia
115	Run	Seth Sentry	Australia
116	Empty Threat	Chvrches	United Kingdom
117	What Went Down	Foals	United Kingdom
118	Through the Roof	Hermitude featuring Young Tapz	Australia/New Zealand
119	Emoticons	The Wombats	United Kingdom
120	White Dress	Set Mo featuring Deutsch Duke	Australia
121	Hallelujah	The Rubens	Australia
122	The Moment	Tame Impala	Australia
123	Kingdom Leader	Boo Seeka	Australia
124	Fool	Boo Seeka	Australia
125	My Own Way	Kita Alexander	Australia
126	Should Have Known Better	Sufjan Stevens	United States
127	Heart Is Full	Miike Snow	Sweden
128	The Wolf	Mumford & Sons	United Kingdom
129	Electric Indigo	The Paper Kites	Australia
130	Dancin John Doe	Drapht	Australia
131	Two Weeks (Like a Version)	#1 Dads featuring Tom Snowdon	Australia
132	Damn Baby	Alpine	Australia
133	House Every Weekend	David Zowie	United Kingdom
134	Heartburn	Wafia	Australia
135	Girl	The Internet featuring Kaytranada	United States/Haiti/Canada
136	Take It to Reality	Alison Wonderland featuring Safia	Australia
137	Rabbit Run	City Calm Down	Australia
138	These Walls	Kendrick Lamar featuring Bilal, Anna Wise and Thundercat	United States
139	Breakaway	In Hearts Wake	Australia
140	Searchlight	Hermitude featuring Yeo	Australia
141	The Night Is on My Side	The Rubens	Australia
142	Games	Alison Wonderland	Australia
143	Give Me Something	Jarryd James	Australia
144	Speak Easy	Mansionair	Australia
145	Believe	Mumford & Sons	United Kingdom
146	I'd Go with You Anywhere	Birds of Tokyo	Australia
147	Crystals	Of Monsters & Men	Iceland
148	Hold	Vera Blue	Australia
149	Regardless	Jarryd James featuring Julia Stone	Australia
150	Tattoo	Tuka	Australia
151	Paper Trails	Joey Badass	United States
152	Be Right There	Diplo and Sleepy Tom	United States/Canada
153	Limit of Love	Boy & Bear	Australia
154	T-Shirt Weather	Circa Waves	United Kingdom
155	Baby Blue	Action Bronson featuring Chance the Rapper	United States
156	My Star	Tuka	Australia
157	West Coast	Fidlar	United States
158	Bodyache	Purity Ring	Canada
159	Walk with Me	Cosmo's Midnight featuring Kučka	Australia
160	Queen of Peace	Florence & the Machine	United Kingdom
161	Aerial Love	Daniel Johns	Australia
162	Love Me Badder	Elliphant	Sweden
163	The Alley	E^ST	Australia
164	Skeletons	The Amity Affliction	Australia
165	Holding On	Disclosure featuring Gregory Porter	United Kingdom/United States
166	Ghost	Tkay Maidza	Australia
167	Not Many (Like a Version)	One Day	Australia
168	New Romantics	Hands Like Houses	Australia
169	Asleep in the Machine	Bootleg Rascal	Australia
170	Ghost Town	Sticky Fingers	Australia
171	Cuffed and Collared	Bad Dreems	Australia
172	Abrasive	Ratatat	United States
173	Underflow	Emma Louise	Australia
174	Love Again	Ta-ku featuring JMSN and Sango	Australia/United States
175	Psycho	Muse	United Kingdom
176	In Plain Sight	Dead Letter Circus	Australia
177	Magic	San Cisco	Australia
178	Snow	San Cisco	Australia
179	Losers	The Weeknd featuring Labrinth	Canada/United Kingdom
180	Ditmas	Mumford & Sons	United Kingdom
181	Dreams	Beck	United States
182	The Blacker the Berry	Kendrick Lamar	United States
183	Automatic	Zhu and AlunaGeorge	United States/United Kingdom
184	Restraint & Release	Gang of Youths	Australia
185	Get Down	Jess Kent	Australia
186	All Day	Kanye West featuring Theophilus London, Allan Kingdom and Paul McCartney	United States/Canada/United Kingdom
187	Nightlight	Silversun Pickups	United States
188	Kooky Eyes	The Jungle Giants	Australia
189	Clip My Wings	Montaigne	Australia
190	Apollo	Last Dinosaurs	Australia
191	Radioface	Gang of Youths	Australia
192	Read My Mind (Like a Version)	Catfish & the Bottlemen	United Kingdom
193	Bottom Feeder	Parkway Drive	Australia
194	Talking to My Diary	Dr. Dre	United States
195	Hurricane	Halsey	United States
196	Electrical	Eves the Behavior	Australia
197	Horses	Porsches	Australia
198	Can't Get Enough of Myself	Santigold featuring B.C.	United States
199	The Way You'd Love Her	Mac DeMarco	United States
200	Preach	Daniel Johns	Australia

== Statistics ==
=== Artists with multiple entries ===
#	Artist	Tracks
4	Tame Impala	4, 5, 34, 61
4	Courtney Barnett	43, 75, 82, 95
3	Major Lazer	3, 74, 98
3	The Wombats	29, 67, 91
3	Florence and the Machine	38, 40, 70
3	Bring Me the Horizon	45, 86, 99
2	Kendrick Lamar	2, 37
2	DJ Snake (Note: Once with Major Lazer (3), once as a lead artist (17))	3, 17
2	MØ (Note: Once solo (60), and once with Major Lazer (3))	3, 60
2	The Weeknd	9, 19
2	Disclosure	10, 62
2	RÜFÜS	12, 28
2	SAFIA	23, 35
2	Flume (Note: Once solo (24), and once with What So Not (90))	24, 90
2	Jamie xx	26, 31
2	Chvrches	32, 51
2	Halsey	42, 94
2	Parkway Drive	48, 58
2	A$AP Rocky	64, 80
2	Thelma Plum (Note: Once with Tuka (81), and once with Golden Features (92))	81, 92
2	Flight Facilities	83, 85

=== Countries represented ===
Country	Total
Australia	54
United Kingdom	26
United States	20
Canada	5
New Zealand	3
Jamaica	2
Denmark	2
France	2
Germany	1
Papua New Guinea	1
Sweden	1

=== Records ===
- The Rubens are the first winning artist since Augie March in 2006 to only feature once in the countdown. Their next closest entry was "Hallelujah" at number 121, which was announced in the "second Hottest 100" (places 200 to 101), revealed on 31 January.
  - The Rubens are also the second Unearthed artist to win the Hottest 100 after Vance Joy in 2013.
- Ngaiire is the first Papua New Guinean to chart in the Hottest 100 countdown.
- The song "Delete" by DMA's charted in the countdown for the second year in a row after a cover by Sticky Fingers featured at number 84. Similarly "Big Jet Plane" by Angus & Julia Stone which won the countdown in 2010 came in at number 81 with a cover by Tuka.
- The 2015 list features 11 different nationalities, breaking the record of 10 from 2013 and 2014.
- With their two entries in this year's list Flight Facilities have now had seven songs from their album Down to Earth in the countdown. This equals the record set by Wolfmother from their debut Wolfmother.
- The song "Cream On Chrome" by Ratatat is the only instrumental song to make the countdown, and is the fifth instrumental song to appear in the Hottest 100 since 1999.
- "Twilight Driving" by Methyl Ethel (#97) and "Be Together" by Major Lazer featuring Wild Belle (#98) were mistakenly played in the wrong order.
- Illy made his seventh consecutive appearance in the Hottest 100, having appeared in every annual countdown since 2009. Similarly, Flight Facilities made their sixth consecutive appearance, having appeared since 2010.

== CD release ==
Triple J's Hottest 100 Volume 23

Compilation album by Various artists
- Released: 26 February 2016
- Labels: Triple J, ABC Music

Disc 1
1. The Rubens – "Hoops" (#1)
2. Tame Impala – "The Less I Know the Better" (#4)
3. Major Lazer & DJ Snake feat. MØ – "Lean On" (#3)
4. Marcus Marr & Chet Faker – "The Trouble with Us" (#6)
5. The Weeknd – "Can't Feel My Face" (#9)
6. Meg Mac – "Never Be" (#11)
7. Jarryd James – "Do You Remember" (#7)
8. Violent Soho – "Like Soda" (#15)
9. RÜFÜS – "You Were Right" (#12)
10. Disclosure feat. Lorde – "Magnets" (#10)
11. Vance Joy – "Fire and the Flood" (#16)
12. Hermitude feat. Mataya & Young Tapz – "The Buzz" (#8)
13. Duke Dumont – "Ocean Drive" (#13)
14. Foals – "Mountain at My Gates" (#20)
15. Macklemore & Ryan Lewis feat. Eric Nally, Melle Mel, Kool Moe Dee & Grandmaster Caz – "Downtown" (#18)
16. The Amity Affliction – "Shine On" (#25)
17. Alison Wonderland – "Run" (#59)
18. SAFIA – "Embracing Me" (#23)
19. The Wombats – "Greek Tragedy" (#29)
20. Jamie xx feat. Young Thug & Popcaan – "I Know There's Gonna Be (Good Times)" (#26)
21. Vallis Alps – "Young" (#27)
Disc 2
1. Courtney Barnett – "Pedestrian at Best" (#43)
2. Gang of Youths – "Magnolia" (#21)
3. L D R U feat. Paige IV – "Keeping Score" (#22)
4. DJ Snake feat. Bipolar Sunshine – "Middle" (#17)
5. Urthboy feat. Bertie Blackman – "Long Loud Hours" (#33)
6. Bring Me the Horizon – "Throne" (#45)
7. Peking Duk feat. Benjamin Joseph – "Say My Name" (#30)
8. CHVRCHES – "Leave A Trace" (#32)
9. Flume feat. Andrew Wyatt – "Some Minds" (#24)
10. A$AP Rocky – "L$D" (#64)
11. Florence and the Machine – "Delilah (Radio Edit)" (#38)
12. San Cisco – "Too Much Time Together" (#49)
13. Snakehips feat. Tinashe & Chance the Rapper – "All My Friends" (#36)
14. Alpine – "Foolish" (#57)
15. Parkway Drive – "Crushed" (#48)
16. Illy – "Swear Jar" (#39)
17. Halsey – "Hold Me Down" (#42)
18. Hayden James – "Something About You" (#44)
19. Unknown Mortal Orchestra – "Multi-Love" (#55)
20. Boo Seeka – "Deception Boy" (#50)
21. Asta feat. Allday – "Dynamite" (#47)

== Top 10 Albums of 2015 ==
A poll of Triple J listeners' favourite albums of the year was held in December 2015. Melbourne singer-songwriter Courtney Barnett won the J Award for her album.

Note: Australian artists

Bold indicates winner.

#	Artist	Album	Country of origin	Tracks in the Hottest 100
1	Tame Impala	Currents	Australia	4, 5, 34, 61
2	Courtney Barnett	Sometimes I Sit and Think, and Sometimes I Just Sit	Australia	43, 75, 82, 95
3	Kendrick Lamar	To Pimp a Butterfly	United States	2, 37, (53 in 2014)
4	Florence and the Machine	How Big, How Blue, How Beautiful	United Kingdom	38, 40, 70
**5**	**The Rubens**	**Hoops**	**Australia**	**1**
6	Gang of Youths	The Positions	Australia	21
7	Foals	What Went Down	United Kingdom	20
8	Jamie xx	In Colour	United Kingdom	26, 31
9	The Wombats	Glitterbug	United Kingdom	29, 67, 91, (25 in 2013)
10	San Cisco	Gracetown	Australia	49, (33 in 2014)
