= Mark Crew =

English songwriter, record producer and mix engineer

- Born: 21 February 1985 (age 41)
- Origin: Uckfield, England
- Genres: Pop, rock, electronic
- Occupations: Record producer, mix engineer, songwriter
- Years active: 2010-present

Mark Crew (born 21 February 1985) is a songwriter, record producer, and mix engineer based in London, known for his work with Bastille, Lovejoy, Rag'n'Bone Man, and the Wombats.

== Production and songwriting ==
Crew produced the albums Bad Blood (UK #1, 3× platinum sales award; US #11, platinum sales award), Wild World (UK #1, gold; US #4) and Doom Days (UK #4; US #5) for Bastille. The albums included the notable singles "Pompeii" (UK #2, 3× platinum; US #5, 6× platinum), "Of the Night" (UK #2, platinum), and "Good Grief" (UK #13, platinum; US #40).

He developed Rag’n’Bone Man and produced a number of tracks on his debut album Human (UK #1, 4× platinum; France #1, 3× platinum; Germany #2, platinum), including the singles "Bitter End" and "Grace." He produced The Wombats albums Glitterbug (UK #5, 1x silver; US #91) and Beautiful People Will Ruin Your Life (UK #3), and also produced the James Arthur single "Empty Space" (UK #22, 1x silver), the Louis Tomlinson single "Two of Us", the Freya Ridings single "Castles" (UK #16, 1x silver) and the James Blunt single "Champions".

The two mixtapes that preceded Bastille's debut album campaign, titled Other People's Heartache Parts I & II, were also produced by Crew. One track from these mixtapes, "Of the Night", was the launch single for the extended version of the album, All This Bad Blood. The song charted at #2 in the UK, and has sold over 1.5 million downloads to date.

After Bad Blood, he produced a further Bastille mixtape titled VS., an eight-song set continuing in the vein of the previous mixtapes, featuring appearances from Lizzo, Angel Haze, and Haim.

He went on to produce Bastille's second album, Wild World. He also mixed 13 titles on the album. Wild World was released on 9 September 2016 and spent two weeks at number 1 on the UK album charts and reached number 4 in the US Billboard 200 charts. The lead single from the album, "Good Grief", spent 23 weeks on the UK Singles Chart and was certified with a Gold sales award.

The first single from Bastille's third studio album, titled "Quarter Past Midnight", was produced at Crew and Dan Smith's studio in London, One Eyed Jack's and was Annie Mac's Hottest Record on 9 May 2018.

Crew also produced the third album from The Wombats. Titled Glitterbug, it was released on 13 April 2015. The first two singles from the album, "Greek Tragedy" and "Give Me a Try", were both Zane Lowe's Hottest Records and play-listed on Radio 1. The album entered the UK albums chart at number 5, and the Australian albums chart at number 2. The Wombats invited Crew back to produce their fourth album, Beautiful People Will Ruin Your Life. The album was produced at his studio. Released on 9 February 2018, the album entered the UK charts at number 3 and the Australian charts at number 5. The singles from the album, "Lemon to a Knife Fight", "Cheetah Tongue", and "Turn", were all selected as Annie Mac's Hottest Records.

Crew co-wrote and co-produced Tears For Fears' song "I Love You but I'm Lost" and mixed the band To Kill a King's self-titled album, producing the tracks "Oh My Love" and "Breathe".

== Best Laid Plans ==
In 2013, Crew founded Best Laid Plans Records with production partners Dan "Braque" Priddy and Dan Smith and Best Laid Plans Music, a music publishing imprint.

The first artist to be produced for Best Laid Plans was Rag'n'Bone Man. The campaign commenced with a mini-album titled Wolves, which featured contributions from Vince Staples, Kae Tempest, and Stig of the Dump. This was followed by the Disfigured EP in March 2015, which included "Bitter End", a track that was performed live at Glastonbury and play-listed for BBC Radio 1. Rag'n'Bone Man is signed to Columbia Records. Crew produced ten tracks on Rag'n'Bone Man's debut album with his production partner and label co-director Dan "Braque" Priddy. Titled Human, it was released on 10 February 2017 and sold 117,000 copies in the UK in its first week of release, becoming the "fastest-selling male debut album of the decade."

The second artist to be signed to Best Laid Plans was Rationale, whose debut EP Fuel to the Fire gained early support from Annie Mac, Huw Stephens and Phil Taggart on BBC Radio 1, and Zane Lowe and Pharrell Williams on Beats 1. Two tracks from the EP, "Fuel to the Fire" and "Fast Lane", were play-listed on Radio 1. Subsequent single "Something for Nothing" was a 'Hottest Record' and also play-listed on BBC Radio 1. Crew mixed all titles on Fuel to the Fire and provided additional production on "Something for Nothing".

As of July 2020, Best Laid Plans represents the following seven artists: Rag'n'Bone Man, Rationale, Kianja, The Dawn of May, Akine, FERDIN&ND, and Flying Ibex.

== Selected discography ==
=== Singles ===
Title	Act	Role	Year
"Call Me What You Like"	Lovejoy	Producer, recording engineer	2023
"Run Into Trouble"	Alok x Bastille	Producer, Co-Writer	2022
"Revolution"	Bastille	Producer, Co-Writer	2022
"Remind Me"	Bastille	Co-Producer, Co-Writer	2022
"Shut Off The Lights"	Bastille	Producer, Co-Writer	2021
"Ready For The High"	The Wombats	Producer	2021
"Everything I Love Is Going to Die"	The Wombats	Producer	2021
"No Bad Days"	Bastille	Producer, Co-Writer	2021
"Unstoppable"	James Blunt	Producer, Co-Writer	2021
"Last of the Whiskey"	James Arthur	Producer, Co-Writer	2021
"Deva Vu"	James Arthur	Producer, Co-Writer	2021
"Distorted Light Beam"	Bastille	Producer, Co-Writer	2021
"Anywhere Away from Here"	Rag'n'Bone Man feat. P!NK	Co-Writer	2021
"Paranoia"	Finn Askew	Producer, Co-Writer	2021
"Egotism"	Finn Askew	Producer, Co-Writer	2021
"If You Ever Leave, I'm Coming with You"	The Wombats	Producer	2021
"Method to the Madness"	The Wombats	Producer	2021
"Deal with It"	Ashnikko	Co-Producer, Co-Writer	2021
"Thelma + Louise"	Bastille	Producer, Co-Writer	2021
"Give Me the Future"	Bastille	Producer, Co-Writer	2021
"Survivin'"	Bastille	Producer, Co-Writer	2020
"What You Gonna Do???"	Bastille	Producer, Co-Writer	2020
"Amen"	Tom Grennan	Producer	2020
"Falling Down"	Paloma Faith	Producer, Co-Writer	2020
"Another Place"	Bastille feat. Alessia Cara	Producer, Co-Writer	2019
"Champions"	James Blunt	Producer, Co-Writer	2019
"I Told You"	James Blunt	Producer, Co-Writer	2019
"Joy"	Bastille	Producer	2019
"Doom Days"	Bastille	Producer	2019
"Giants"	Calvin Harris ft. Rag'n'Bone Man	Vocal Producer	2019
"Castles"	Freya Ridings	Additional Production	2019
"Begging"	Moss Kena	Co-Producer, Co-Writer	2019
"Two of Us"	Louis Tomlinson	Producer	2019
"My Cheating Heart"	Love Fame Tragedy	Producer	2019
"Ice Cream"	Mika	Co-Producer	2019
"Sound of an Orchestra"	Mika	Producer	2019
"Quarter Past Midnight"	Bastille	Producer	2018
"Empty Space"	James Arthur	Producer	2018
"At My Weakest"	James Arthur	Producer, Co-Writer	2018
"Turn"	The Wombats	Co-Producer	2018
"Cheetah Tongue"	The Wombats	Co-Producer	2018
"Lemon to a Knife Fight"	The Wombats	Co-Producer	2018
"I Love You but I’m Lost"	Tears For Fears	Co-Producer, Co-Writer	2017
"World Gone Mad"	Bastille	Producer	2017
"Grace (We All Try)"	Rag'n'Bone Man	Co-Producer	2017
"Basket Case (Theme from The Tick)"	Bastille	Producer, Mixer	2017
"Blame"	Bastille	Producer	2017
"Broken People (from Bright OST)"	Logic feat. Rag'n'Bone Man	Co-Writer	2017
"Send Them Off!"	Bastille	Producer, Mixer	2016
"Good Grief"	Bastille	Producer	2016
"Prodigal Son"	Rationale	Additional production, Mixer	2016
"Something for Nothing"	Rationale	Additional production, Mixer, Co-Writer	2016
"Emoticons"	The Wombats	Producer	2015
"Be Your Shadow"	The Wombats	Producer	2015
"Give Me a Try"	The Wombats	Producer	2015
"Greek Tragedy"	The Wombats	Producer	2015
"Bad Blood"	Bastille	Producer, mixer	2013
"Of the Night"	Bastille	Producer	2013
"Pompeii"	Bastille	Producer	2013

=== Albums and EPs ===
Title	Act	Role	Year
Wake Up & It's Over	Lovejoy	Producer, Recording engineer on "Call Me What You Like" & "Consequences"	2023
Give Me the Future	Bastille	Producer on all titles except "Promises", Mixer, Co-Writer	2022
Fix Yourself, Not the World	The Wombats	Producer	2022
Life by Misadventure	Rag'n'Bone Man	Co-Writer on 3 tracks	2021
Wherever I Go, I Want to Leave	Love Fame Tragedy	Producer, Co-Writer on some tracks	2020
My Name Is Michael Holbrook	Mika	Producer, Co-Writer on Cry and Stay High	2019
You	James Arthur	Producer	2019
Doom Days	Bastille	Producer	2019
I Don't Want to Play the Victim, but I'm Really Good at It EP	Love Fame Tragedy	Producer	2019
Beautiful People Will Ruin Your Life	The Wombats	Producer	2018
Witness	Katy Perry	Co-Producer, Co-Writer on "Act My Age"	2017
Wonderland EP	Jasmine Thompson	Producer, Mixer on "Wanna Know Love", "Fix Me", and "Drama"	2017
Vessels EP	Rationale	Mixer, Additional Production on "Prodigal Son"	2017
Human	Rag'n'Bone Man	Producer on 10 titles, Co-Writer	2017
Wild World	Bastille	Producer on all titles, Mixer on some titles	2016
Fuel to the Fire EP	Rationale	Mixer	2015
Disfigured EP	Rag'n'Bone Man	Producer, Mixer, Songwriter	2015
To Kill a King	To Kill a King	Producer on all titles, Mixer on some titles	2015
Glitterbug	The Wombats	Producer	2015
Wolves EP	Rag'n'Bone Man	Producer, Mixer, Songwriter	2014
VS.	Bastille	Producer, Mixer on some titles	2014
All This Bad Blood	Bastille	Producer on all titles, Mixer on some titles	2013
Bad Blood	Bastille	Producer on all titles, Mixer on some titles	2013
