= Glitterbug =

Glitterbug may refer to:

- Glitterbug (film), final film of Derek Jarman
- Glitterbug (album), album by The Wombats, 2015
- Glitterbug Tour 2015, by The Wombats
- Glitterbug B Sides EP by The Wombats exclusive to HMV 2015
- "Glitterbug", song by Page and Duffy from album The Vanity Project
- "Glitterbug", song from Slinky Vagabond Keanan Duffty
- Glitterbug (band) from Insomnia Festival and Nabovarsel
