= Glitterbug Tour 2015/2016 =

2015–16 concert tour by the Wombats

- Tour by The Wombats
- Poster for the Wombats show in Sydney.
- Associated album: Glitterbug
- Start date: 15 January 2015
- End date: 3 January 2016
- Legs: 13
- No. of shows: 121

The Glitterbug Tour 2015 is a major concert tour by Liverpool alternative band the Wombats, in support of their third studio album Glitterbug, which was released in April 2015. The band played 121 shows in 22 different countries.

== Synopsis ==
The tour started in January 2015 with a set of warm up shows in the UK and USA. The full tour began in March across continental Europe, continuing in the United Kingdom following the release of the album Glitterbug. This was followed by a tour of America in late April and May. The band then appeared in festivals across the world during the summer, including Splendour in the Grass where the band drew the largest crowd of the festival. The band followed this with additional tours of Europe, the United States and Australia, where they headlined the Byron Bay leg of Falls Festival on New Year's Eve. The tour concluded at the Hordern Pavilion in Sydney on 3 January 2016.

== Setlists ==
Notable absentees from the setlist were 2007 hit single "Backfire at the Disco" and "Anti-D", as well as previous regular "Euroscheisse" only making infrequent appearances.

16 January 2015 in Liverpool (The Magnet)

1. "Your Body is a Weapon"
2. "Jump into the Fog"
3. "Moving to New York"
4. "Give Me a Try"
5. "Techno Fan"
6. "Kill The Director"
7. "The English Summer"
8. "1996"
9. "Party in a Forest (Where's Laura?)"
10. "Greek Tragedy"
11. "Tokyo (Vampires and Wolves)"
12. "Let's Dance to Joy Division"
13. "Euroscheisse"
13 March 2015 in Paris (La Cigale)

1. "Your Body is a Weapon"
2. "Jump into the Fog"
3. "Moving to New York"
4. "Greek Tragedy"
5. "Party in a Forest (Where's Laura?)"
6. "Be Your Shadow"
7. "1996"
8. "This Is Not a Party"
9. "Headspace"
10. "The English Summer"
11. "Techno Fan"
12. "Little Miss Pipedream"
13. "Kill the Director"
14. "Give Me a Try"
15. "Tokyo (Vampires & Wolves)"
16. "Emoticons"
17. "Let's Dance to Joy Division"
13 April 2015 in London (Brixton Academy)

1. "Your Body is a Weapon"
2. "Jump into the Fog"
3. "Moving to New York"
4. "Greek Tragedy"
5. "Party in a Forest (Where's Laura?)"
6. "Be Your Shadow"
7. "1996"
8. "This Is Not a Party"
9. "Headspace"
10. "The English Summer"
11. "Techno Fan"
12. "Little Miss Pipedream"
13. "Kill the Director"
14. "Give Me a Try"
15. "Tokyo (Vampires & Wolves)"
16. "Emoticons"
17. "Let's Dance to Joy Division"
18. "Euroscheisse"
25 July 2015 in Byron Bay (Splendour In The Grass)

1. "Your Body is a Weapon"
2. "Jump into the Fog"
3. "Moving to New York"
4. "Greek Tragedy"
5. "Be Your Shadow"
6. "1996"
7. "This Is Not a Party"
8. "Techno Fan"
9. "The English Summer"
10. "Give Me a Try"
11. "Emoticons"
12. "Tokyo (Vampires & Wolves)"
13. "Let's Dance to Joy Division"
14. "Killing In The Name" (Rage Against The Machine cover)
1 October 2015 in London (Alexandra Palace)

1. "Give Me A Try"
2. "Jump into the Fog"
3. "Moving to New York"
4. "1996"
5. "Be Your Shadow"
6. "Your Body is a Weapon"
7. "Patricia the Stripper"
8. "Pink Lemonade"
9. "Techno Fan"
10. "Emoticons"
11. "Curveballs"
12. "The English Summer"
13. "Kill the Director"
14. "Tokyo (Vampires & Wolves)"
15. "Isabel"
16. "Greek Tragedy"
17. "Let's Dance to Joy Division"
18. "Killing In The Name" (Rage Against The Machine cover)

=== Songs ===
- "Kill the Director"
- "Moving to New York"
- "Party in a Forest (Where's Laura?)"
- "Let's Dance to Joy Division"
- "Little Miss Pipedream"
- "Patricia the Stripper"
- "Tokyo (Vampires & Wolves)"
- "Jump into the Fog"
- "Techno Fan"
- "1996"
- "Emoticons"
- "Give Me a Try"
- "Greek Tragedy"
- "Be Your Shadow"
- "Headspace"
- "This Is Not a Party"
- "Isabel"
- "Your Body is a Weapon"
- "The English Summer"
- "Pink Lemonade"
- "Curveballs"
- "Euroscheisse"

== Personnel ==
Band:

- Matthew Murphy – vocals, guitar, synths
- Dan Haggis – backing vocals, drums, stylophone, harmonica, melodica, synthesizers
- Tord Øverland Knudsen – backing vocals, bass, synths

Crew:

- Simon Fuller - Tour Manager
- Pete Bartlett - FOH Engineer
- Paul Roberts - Monitor Engineer
- Jamie Hicks - Drums/Keys/MIDI Technician
- Joel Ashton - Guitar/Bass Technician
- Dan Hill - Lighting Designer
- Tony Hughes - Merchandise
- Fuller's Ma - Vibes

== Support acts ==
- Cheerleader
- Circa Waves
- Compny
- Darlia
- Kid Astray
- Life in Film
- POP ETC
- Prides
- Royal Teeth
- Sundara Karma
- Team Me
- The Night Café

== Tour dates ==
| Date | City | Country | Venue | Support act(s) |
|---|---|---|---|---|
Warm up dates
| 15 January 2015 | London | United Kingdom | Old Blue Last | Sundara Karma |
| 16 January 2015 | Liverpool | United Kingdom | The Magnet | Sundara Karma |
| 19 January 2015 | New York City | United States | Rough Trade | - |
| 20 January 2015 | New York City | United States | Mercury Lounge | - |
| 22 January 2015 | San Francisco | United States | Popscene at the Rickshaw | - |
| 23 January 2015 | Los Angeles | United States | Bootleg Hifi | - |
| 24 January 2015 | Los Angeles | United States | Bootleg Hifi | - |
| 24 February 2015 | Melbourne | Australia | Shebeen | - |
| 25 February 2015^{[A]} | Sydney | Australia | Sydney Harbour | - |
Leg I: Europe I
| 13 March 2015 | Paris | France | Cigale | Compny Sundara Karma |
| 15 March 2015 | Antwerp | Belgium | Trix | Compny Sundara Karma |
| 16 March 2015 | Amsterdam | Netherlands | Melkweg Max | Compny Sundara Karma |
| 18 March 2015 | Frankfurt | Germany | Batschkapp | - |
| 19 March 2015 | Bremen | Germany | Aladin | - |
| 21 March 2015 | Odense | Denmark | Posten | - |
| 22 March 2015 | Oslo | Norway | Rockefeller | - |
| 23 March 2015 | Stockholm | Sweden | Debaser Medis | - |
| 25 March 2015 | Hamburg | Germany | Grosse Freiheit | Darlia |
| 26 March 2015 | Berlin | Germany | Astra | Darlia |
| 27 March 2015 | Munich | Germany | Tonhalle | Darlia |
| 29 March 2015 | Stuttgart | Germany | LKA Longhorn | Darlia |
| 30 March 2015 | Cologne | Germany | Ewerk | Darlia |
| 31 March 2015 | Zürich | Switzerland | Xtra | - |
| 2 April 2015 | Rome | Italy | Orion | - |
| 3 April 2015 | Milan | Italy | Fabrique | - |
| 5 April 2015 | Vienna | Austria | Arena | - |
Leg II: United Kingdom I
| 8 April 2015 | Bristol | United Kingdom | Bristol Academy | Darlia Team Me |
| 9 April 2015 | Manchester | United Kingdom | Manchester Academy | Darlia Team Me |
| 10 April 2015 | Birmingham | United Kingdom | Birmingham Academy | Darlia Team Me |
| 11 April 2015 | Sheffield | United Kingdom | Leadmill | Darlia Team Me |
| 13 April 2015 | London | United Kingdom | Brixton Academy | Darlia Compny |
| 15 April 2015 | Oxford | United Kingdom | Oxford Academy | Darlia Compny |
| 16 April 2015 | London | United Kingdom | The Hippodrome | Sundara Karma |
| 17 April 2015 | Glasgow | United Kingdom | Barrowlands | Darlia Compny |
| 18 April 2015 | Liverpool | United Kingdom | Liverpool Academy | Compny Jennifer Davies |
| 19 April 2015 | Newcastle | United Kingdom | Newcastle Academy | Darlia Compny |
Leg III: North America I
| 21 April 2015 | Toronto | Canada | Lee's Palace | Cheerleader Life In Film |
| 23 April 2015 | Philadelphia | United States | Union Transfer | Cheerleader Life In Film |
| 24 April 2015 | South Burlington | United States | Higher Ground | Cheerleader Life In Film |
| 25 April 2015 | Pawtucket | United States | The Met | Cheerleader Life In Film |
| 27 April 2015 | New York City | United States | Webster Hall | Cheerleader Life In Film |
| 28 April 2015 | Boston | United States | Paradise Rock Club | Cheerleader Life In Film |
| 30 April 2015 | Washington, D.C. | United States | 9:30 Club | Cheerleader Life In Film |
| 1 May 2015 | Albany | United States | Hollow Bar + Kitchen | Cheerleader Life In Film |
| 2 May 2015 | Rochester | United States | Montage Hall | Cheerleader Life In Film |
| 4 May 2015 | Columbus | United States | Newport Music Hall | Cheerleader Life In Film |
| 5 May 2015 | Indianapolis | United States | Deluxe at the Old National Centre | Cheerleader Life In Film |
| 6 May 2015 | Minneapolis | United States | Varsity Theater | Cheerleader Life In Film |
| 8 May 2015 | Lawrence | United States | Granada Theatre | Cheerleader Life In Film |
| 9 May 2015 | Denver | United States | Bluebird Theatre | Cheerleader Life In Film |
| 12 May 2015 | Los Angeles | United States | Fonda Theatre | Cheerleader Life In Film |
| 13 May 2015 | San Diego | United States | House of Blues | Cheerleader Life In Film |
| 15 May 2015 | Santa Ana | United States | Constellation | Cheerleader Life In Film |
| 16 May 2015 | San Francisco | United States | Fillmore | Cheerleader Life In Film |
| 18 May 2015 | Portland | United States | Wonder Ballroom | Cheerleader Life In Film |
| 19 May 2015 | Seattle | United States | The Crocodile | Cheerleader Life In Film |
| 20 May 2015 | Vancouver | Canada | Imperial | Cheerleader Life In Film |
Leg IV: Europe II
| 23 May 2015 | London | United Kingdom | Roehampton University | - |
| 5 June 2015^{[B]} | Valencia | Spain | Ciudad de las Artes y Las Ciencias de Valencia | - |
| 10 June 2015 | London | United Kingdom | Nambucca | - |
| 13 June 2015^{[C]} | Landgraaf | Netherlands | Megaland | - |
| 24 June 2015^{[D]} | Seinäjoki | Finland | Törnävä Island | - |
| 26 June 2015^{[E]} | Budapest | Hungary | Margitsziget | - |
| 27 June 2015^{[F]} | Moscow | Russia | Muzeon Park | - |
| 4 July 2015 | Coventry | United Kingdom | War Memorial Park | - |
| 8 July 2015^{[G]} | Lisbon | Portugal | Passeio Maritimo de Alges | - |
| 10 July 2015^{[H]} | Strathallan | United Kingdom | Blairgowrie | - |
| 15 July 2015^{[I]} | Mons | Belgium | Dour | - |
| 18 July 2015 | Tromsø | Norway | Telegrafbukta | - |
| 19 July 2015^{[J]} | Cuxhaven | Germany | Nordholz | |
Leg V: Australia I
| 23 July 2015 | Perth | Australia | Metro City | Circa Waves |
| 25 July 2015^{[K]} | Byron Bay | Australia | North Byron Parklands | - |
| 27 July 2015 | Sydney | Australia | The Hordern Pavilion | Circa Waves |
| 25 July 2015 | Melbourne | Australia | Margaret Court Arena | Circa Waves |
| 30 July 2015 | Adelaide | Australia | Entertainment Centre Theatre | Circa Waves |
Leg VI: North America II
| 1 August 2015 | Chicago | United States | Double Door | - |
| 2 August 2015^{[L]} | Chicago | United States | Grant Park | - |
Leg VII: Europe III
| 7 August 2015^{[M]} | Mohelnice | Czech Republic | Morava Camp | - |
| 9 August 2015^{[N]} | Buftea | Romania | Domeniul Stirbey | - |
| 14 August 2015^{[O]} | Yverdon-les-Bains | Switzerland | Rives Park | - |
| 15 August 2015^{[P]} | Leipzig | Germany | Störmthaler See | - |
| 20 August 2015^{[Q]} | Sankt Pölten | Austria | Green Park | - |
| 29 August 2015^{[R]} | Reading | United Kingdom | Richfield Avenue | - |
| 30 August 2015^{[R]} | Leeds | United Kingdom | Bramham Park | - |
Leg VIII: North America III
| 12 September 2015 | Sterling Heights | United States | Freedom Hill Amphitheatre | - |
| 13 September 2015 | Philadelphia | United States | Festival Pier | - |
Leg IX: United Kingdom II
| 26 September 2015 | Stoke | United Kingdom | Keele University | Sundara Karma, Prides & COMPNY! |
| 27 September 2015 | Norwich | United Kingdom | University of East Anglia | Sundara Karma, Prides & COMPNY! |
| 28 September 2015 | Nottingham | United Kingdom | Rock City | Sundara Karma, Prides & COMPNY! |
| 30 September 2015 | Southampton | United Kingdom | Guildhall | Sundara Karma, Prides & COMPNY! |
| 1 October 2015 | London | United Kingdom | Alexandra Palace | Sundara Karma, Prides & COMPNY! |
| 2 October 2015 | Cardiff | United Kingdom | Cardiff University | Sundara Karma, Prides & COMPNY! |
| 21 October 2015 | Manchester | United Kingdom | Apollo | Sundara Karma, Prides & COMPNY! |
| 23 October 2015 | Liverpool | United Kingdom | Guild of Students | Sundara Karma, Prides & COMPNY! |
Leg X: Europe IV
| 29 October 2015 | Stavanger | Norway | Folken | - |
| 30 October 2015 | Bergen | Norway | Logen Theatre | - |
| 31 October 2015 | Trondheim | Norway | Byscenen | - |
| 1 November 2015 | Oslo | Norway | Rockefeller | - |
| 3 November 2015 | Paris | France | La Trabendo | - |
| 4 November 2015 | Luxembourg City | Luxembourg | Den Atelier | - |
| 6 November 2015 | Utrecht | Netherlands | Ronda | - |
| 7 November 2015 | Groningen | Netherlands | Oosperpoort | - |
| 8 November 2015 | The Hague | Netherlands | Paard | - |
| 9 November 2015 | Leuven | Belgium | Depot | - |
| 10 November 2015 | Cologne | Germany | Palladium | - |
| 12 November 2015 | Eindhoven | Netherlands | Efenaar | - |
| 13 November 2015 | Solothurn | Switzerland | Kofmehl | - |
| 14 November 2015 | Linz | Austria | Posthof | - |
| 16 November 2015 | Berlin | Germany | Astra Kulturhaus | - |
| 17 November 2015 | Prague | Czech Republic | Lucerna Music Bar | - |
| 18 November 2015 | Hamburg | Germany | Grosse Freiheit 36 | - |
| 19 November 2015 | Munich | Germany | Tonhalle | - |
Leg XI: North America IV
| 23 November 2015 | Boston | United States | House of Blues | Royal Teeth and POP ETC |
| 24 November 2015 | New York City | United States | Terminal 5 | Royal Teeth and POP ETC |
| 25 November 2015 | Buffalo | United States | The Waiting Room | Royal Teeth and POP ETC |
| 27 November 2015 | Baltimore | United States | Rams Head Live | Royal Teeth and POP ETC |
| 28 November 2015 | Wilmington | United States | Ziggy's by the Sea | Royal Teeth and POP ETC |
| 29 November 2015 | Atlanta | United States | The Loft | Royal Teeth and POP ETC |
| 30 November 2015 | Nashville | United States | Mercy Lounge | Royal Teeth and POP ETC |
| 1 December 2015 | St Louis | United States | Duck Room | - |
| 3 December 2015 | Minneapolis | United States | Carlson Family Stage | - |
| 4 December 2015 | Chicago | United States | Aragon Ballroom | - |
| 5 December 2015 | Broomfield | United States | 1stbank Centre | - |
| 8 December 2015 | Salt Lake City | United States | The Urban Lounge | - |
| 13 December 2015 | San Diego | United States | Valley View Casino Centre | - |
| 18 December 2015 | Columbus | United States | A and R Music Bar | - |
| 20 December 2015 | Wilkes-Barre | United States | F. M. Kirby Centre | - |
Leg XII: Australia II
| 29 December 2015^{[S]} | Victoria | Australia | Lorne | - |
| 30 December 2015^{[S]} | Tasmania | Australia | Marion Bay | - |
| 31 December 2015^{[S]} | New South Wales | Australia | Byron Bay | - |
| 3 January 2016 | Sydney | Australia | Hordern Pavilion | Last Dinosaurs |

Festivals and other miscellaneous performances
^{A} Part of "[V] Island Party"
^{B} Part of "El Festival de les Arts"
^{C} Part of "Pinkpop Festival"
^{D} Part of "Provinssirock Festival"
^{E} Part of "Budapest Essentials Festival"
^{F} Part of "Fingers Up Festival"
^{G} Part of "NOS Alive"
^{H} Part of "T in the Park"
^{I} Part of "Dour Festival"
^{J} Part of "Deichbrand Festival"
^{K} Part of "Splendour in the Grass"
^{L} Part of "Lollapalooza"
^{M} Part of "Ahmad Tea Music Festival"
^{N} Part of "Summer Well Festival"
^{O} Part of "Antidote Festival"
^{P} Part of "Highfield Festival"
^{Q} Part of "FM4 Frequency Festival"
^{R} Part of "Reading and Leeds Festival"
^{S} Part of "Falls Festival"
