= My Circuitboard City =

Single by The Wombats
- Released: 2 March 2009
- Recorded: 2009
- Genre: indie pop, indie rock
- Length: 2:50
- Label: 14th Floor Records
- Songwriter(s): Dan Haggis, Tord Øverland Knudsen, Matthew Murphy

The Wombats singles chronology
"Is This Christmas?" (2008)	"My Circuitboard City" (2009)	"Tokyo (Vampires & Wolves)" (2010)

My Circuitboard City is a single by English indie pop band The Wombats. The single was released on 2 March 2009 on CD and digital download. Like its predecessor single Is This Christmas? it was a standalone release and does not feature on any of the band's albums. It reached number 69 on the UK Singles Chart.

== Track listings ==
CD single
No.	Title	Length
1.	"My Circuitboard City"	2:50
2.	"Lets Dance to Joy Division" (Live from the Royal Albert Hall)	4:15

iTunes EP
No.	Title	Length
1.	"My Circuitboard City"	2:50
2.	"My Circuitboard City" (Live from Liverpool Arena)	3:10
3.	"Lets Dance to Joy Division" (Live from the Royal Albert Hall)	4:15
4.	"Ostrich Song"	2:42
5.	"My Circuitboard City" (SiN Remix)	3:48

== Chart performance ==
Chart (2009)	Peak position
UK Singles (OCC)	69

== Release history ==
Region	Date	Format	Label	Catalogue
United Kingdom	2 March 2009	Digital download	14th Floor Records	B001NPAWJA
United Kingdom	2 March 2009	CD single	14th Floor Records	B001NPAWJA
