= Joe Janiak =

- Born: Joseph Janiak
- Genres: Alternative; dance; pop; indie; rock
- Occupations: Singer-songwriter; record producer
- Years active: 2012–present

Joseph Janiak is a multi-platinum selling British singer-songwriter and record producer based in Los Angeles, California. He is mostly known for being a songwriter for the likes of Måneskin and Tom Morello, Ellie Goulding, Lewis Capaldi, Elle King, Snakehips, Noah Cyrus, Avicii, Tove Lo, Bebe Rexha, Kygo, Matt Maeson and more.

== Discography ==
=== Lead singer ===
| Single | Year |
|---|---|
| "The Best You Ever Had" | 2018 |
| "Heaven Knows" | 2018 |
| "The Big One" | 2019 |
| "In My Head" | 2020 |

=== Guest appearances ===
| Title | Year | Other artist(s) | Album |
|---|---|---|---|
| "Vibes" | 2016 | Tove Lo | Lady Wood |
| "Bad Reputation" | 2019 | Avicii | TIM |
| "Never Leave Me" | 2019 | Avicii | TIM |
| "Follow" | 2020 | Kygo | Golden Hour |

=== Songwriting and Production Credits ===
| Year | Title | Artist(s) | Album | Credits |
|---|---|---|---|---|
| 2013 | "Gold" | Bondax | Non-album single | Co-writer |
| 2014 | "Beating Heart" | Ellie Goulding | Divergent: OST | Co-writer |
| 2014 | "Higher Than Higher" | Take That | III | Co-writer |
| 2015 | "The Original High" | Adam Lambert | The Original High | Co-writer |
| 2015 | "Underground" | Adam Lambert | The Original High | Co-writer |
| 2015 | "There I Said It" | Adam Lambert | The Original High | Co-writer |
| 2015 | "Around U" | Ellie Goulding | Delirium | Co-writer |
| 2015 | "Forever (Pt. II)" | Snakehips | Forever Pt. II EP | Co-writer |
| 2016 | "Make Me..." (featuring G-Eazy) | Britney Spears | Glory | Co-writer |
| 2016 | "Vibes" (featuring Joe Janiak) | Tove Lo | Lady Wood | Co-writer/Featured Artist |
| 2016 | "Mayflies" | Benjamin Francis Leftwich | After The Rain | Co-writer/Producer |
| 2016 | "Groves" | Benjamin Francis Leftwich | After The Rain | Co-writer/Producer |
| 2016 | "Summer" | Benjamin Francis Leftwich | After The Rain | Co-writer/Producer |
| 2016 | "Just Breathe" | Benjamin Francis Leftwich | After The Rain | Co-writer/Producer |
| 2017 | "Don't Leave" (with MØ) | Snakehips | Non-album singles | Co-writer/Producer |
| 2017 | "Tremble" | LPX | Non-album singles | Co-writer |
| 2017 | "Cycles" | Tove Lo | Blue Lips | Co-writer |
| 2017 | "Explore" | Sundara Karma | Youth Is Only Ever Fun in Retrospect | Producer |
| 2017 | "Flame" | Sundara Karma | Youth Is Only Ever Fun in Retrospect | Co-writer/Producer |
| 2018 | "Sway" | Tove Styrke | Sway | Co-writer/Producer |
| 2018 | "On a Level" | Tove Styrke | Sway | Co-writer/Producer |
| 2018 | "Punches" | Noah Cyrus | Good Cry EP | Co-writer/Producer |
| 2018 | "Fever" | Elley Duhe | Dragon Mentality EP | Co-writer/Producer |
| 2018 | "New York Narcotic" | The Knocks | New York Narcotic | Co-writer |
| 2018 | "Walk Away" | Hurts | Desire | Co-writer/Producer |
| 2018 | "Wherever You Go" | Hurts | Desire | Co-writer/Producer |
| 2018 | "Debbie" | Your Smith | Bad Habit EP | Co-writer |
| 2019 | "Gucci Rock n Rolla" (featuring Rivers Cuomo & Kyle) | Snakehips | Non-album single | Co-writer |
| 2019 | "In Vain" | Sigrid | Sucker Punch | Co-writer |
| 2019 | "End of the Earth" | Marina | Love + Fear | Co-writer |
| 2019 | "You" | Marina | Love + Fear | Co-writer |
| 2019 | "Bad Reputation" (featuring Joe Janiak) | Avicii | Tim | Co-writer/Featured Artist |
| 2019 | "Never Leave Me" (featuring Joe Janiak) | Avicii | Tim | Co-writer/Featured Artist |
| 2019 | "Ain't A Thing" | Avicii | Tim | Co-writer |
| 2019 | "Fades Away" | Avicii | Tim | Co-writer |
| 2019 | "Down Low" | Astrid S | Non-album singles | Producer |
| 2019 | "Never Gonna Like You" (with Snakehips) | Bea Miller | Non-album singles | Co-writer |
| 2019 | "Forever" | Lewis Capaldi | Divinely Uninspired to a Hellish Extent | Co-writer/Producer |
| 2020 | "Defenceless" | Louis Tomlinson | Walls | Co-writer/Producer |
| 2020 | "Better Now" | Oh Wonder | No One Else Can Wear Your Crown | Co-writer |
| 2020 | "Bad News Baby" | ALMA | Have U Seen Her? | Co-writer |
| 2020 | "Love Don't" | Adam Lambert | VELVET | Co-writer/Producer |
| 2020 | "Drunk Enough To" | NEA | Non-album single | Producer |
| 2020 | "New Best Friend" | Neon Trees | I Can Feel You Forgetting Me | Co-writer/Producer |
| 2020 | "FAYF" | Grey | DARK | Co-writer |
| 2020 | "Follow" (with Joe Janiak) | Kygo | Golden Hour | Co-writer/Featured Artist |
| 2021 | "Moon" | Jonah Kagen | Non-album single | Co-writer/Producer |
| 2021 | "Call My Name" | JP Cooper | She | Co-writer/Producer |
| 2021 | "Bitter Taste" | Billy Idol | The Roadside | Co-writer |
| 2021 | "Wish You Did" | Jonah Kagen | Non-album singles | Co-writer/Producer |
| 2021 | "Catching A Dream" | Jonah Kagen | Non-album singles | Co-writer/Producer |
| 2022 | "Purity" | Lilyisthatyou | Non-album singles | Co-writer/Producer |
| 2022 | "Drowning" | Jonah Kagen | Non-album singles | Co-writer/Producer |
| 2022 | "Last Man On Earth" | Anna Bates | Non-album singles | Co-writer/Producer |
| 2022 | "Plug Me In" | Coin | Uncanny Valley | Co-writer |
| 2022 | "Turbulence" | Jonah Kagen | Non-album single | Co-writer/Producer |
| 2022 | "All These Dreams" | Sundara Karma | Oblivion! | Co-writer |
| 2022 | "Blood Runs Red" | Matt Maeson | Never Had To Leave | Co-writer |
| 2022 | "One Day Less" | Anson Seabra | Non-album single | Co-writer |
| 2022 | "Cage" | Billy Idol | The Cage | Co-writer |
| 2022 | "Running From The Ghost" | Billy Idol | The Cage | Co-writer |
| 2022 | "Rebel Like You' | Billy Idol | The Cage | Co-writer |
| 2022 | "Night at the Zoo" | Foreign Air | Hello Sunshine | Co-writer/Producer |
| 2022 | "Threads" | Desure | Non-album single | Co-producer |
| 2022 | "Will You Love Me Tomorrow" | Lauren Spencer Smith | Meet Cute (Motion Picture Soundtrack) | Producer |
| 2022 | "Graveyard Shift" | Jonah Kagen | Georgia Got Colder | Co-writer/Producer |
| 2022 | "Chemicals!" | Jonah Kagen | Georgia Got Colder | Co-writer/Producer |
| 2022 | "Fever" (featuring Lukas Graham) | Kygo | Thrill of the Chase | Co-writer |
| 2023 | "Gossip" (featuring Tom Morello) | Måneskin | Rush! | Co-writer |
| 2023 | "Pinewood" | Desure | Still Blue | Co-producer |
| 2023 | "Still Blue" | Desure | Still Blue | Co-producer |
| 2023 | "Love Go By" | Elle King | Come Get Your Wife | Co-writer |
| 2023 | "Pretty Vicious- Acoustic" | The Struts | Unplugged at EastWest | Co-writer |
| 2023 | "Hungry Heart" (featuring Hayley Kiyoko) | Steve Aoki & Galantis | Non-album single | Co-writer |
| 2023 | "Satellite" (featuring Snoop Dogg) | Bebe Rexha | Bebe | Co-writer/Producer |
| 2023 | "Blue Moon" | Bebe Rexha | Bebe | Co-writer/Producer |
| 2023 | "I Am" | Bebe Rexha | Bebe | Co-producer |
| 2023 | "Who's Gonna Love You Tonight" (featuring Tinashe) | Snakehips | never worry | Co-writer/Co-producer |
| 2023 | "Sometimes..." (featuring Daya & EARTHGANG) | Snakehips | never worry | Co-writer/Co-producer |
| 2023 | "Deal with It" (featuring Kilo Kush) | Snakehips | never worry | Co-writer |
| 2023 | "Favorite Daze" | Neon Trees | Non-album singles | Co-writer/Co-producer |
| 2023 | "Losing My Head" | Neon Trees | Non-album singles | Co-writer/Producer |
| 2023 | "Swinging At The Stars" | Claire Rosinkranz | Just Because | Co-writer/Producer |
| 2024 | "Another Nightmare" | The Vaccines | Pick-Up Full Of Pink Carnations | Co-writer |
| 2024 | "Love At First Bite" | Sorana | Techno Sexual | Co-writer/Producer |
| 2024 | "Lemons" | Cyn | Valley Girl: Side A - Lost on Laurel | Co-writer |
| 2024 | "dance of the trees" | Mikayla Geier | here we go again... | Co-writer/Producer |
| 2024 | "i don't feel safe in my body" | Mikayla Geier | here we go again... | Producer |
| 2024 | "El Diablo" | Neon Trees | Non-album singles | Co-writer/Producer |
| 2024 | "Vienna (Everything's Fine)" | Vienna Vienna | Non-album singles | Co-writer |
| 2024 | "Chelsea After Hours" | Desure | Non-album singles | Co-writer/Producer |
| 2024 | "Like A River" | Desure | Non-album singles | Co-writer/Producer |
| 2024 | "Lonely In Paris" | Gina Alice | Dreamcatcher | Co-writer/Producer |
| 2024 | "Game Show" | Gina Alice | Dreamcatcher | Co-writer/Producer |
| 2025 | "The World's Not Out To Get Me, I Am" | The Wombats | Oh! The Ocean | Co-writer/Producer |
| 2025 | "Still Dancing" | Billy Idol | Non-album singles | Co-writer |
| 2025 | "Starry Eyed" | Good Neighbours | Non-album singles | Co-writer |
