= Is This Christmas? =

- 2008 release

Single by The Wombats
- Released: December 15, 2008
- Recorded: 2008
- Genre: Indie rock
- Length: 3:34
- Label: 14th Floor Records
- Songwriter(s): Dan Haggis, Tord Øverland Knudsen, Matthew Murphy

The Wombats singles chronology
"Kill the Director" (2008)	"Is This Christmas?" (2008)	"My Circuitboard City" (2009)

"Is This Christmas?" is a single by English indie pop band The Wombats.

"Is This Christmas?" was the first single released since the singles from the album The Wombats Proudly Present: A Guide to Love, Loss and Desperation. It is released under 14th Floor Records, and was available on Vinyl, CD and through iTunes. It originally appeared on the second edition of compilation The Best Kids Christmas Album in the World Ever Ever!!!, released 10 December 2007 on KIDS Records.

All proceeds of the single were put towards the charity MENCAP. The single features comedian Les Dennis in the introduction of the song.

== Music video ==
A music video was produced to promote the single.

== Track listings ==
CD single
No.	Title	Length
1.	"Is This Christmas?"	3:37

iTunes EP
No.	Title	Length
1.	"Is This Christmas?" (Radio Edit)	3:37
2.	"Is This Christmas?" (featuring Les Dennis)	3:44

== Chart performance ==
Chart (2010)	Peak position
UK Singles (OCC)	49

== Release history ==
Region	Date	Format	Label	Catalogue
United Kingdom	12 December 2008	Digital download	14th Floor Records	B001JQHT7Q
United Kingdom	15 December 2008	CD single	14th Floor Records	B001JQHT7Q
