= This Acoustic Glitch =

EP by The Wombats
- Released: 11 March 2011
- Genre: Indie rock, acoustic rock
- Label: 14th Floor
- Producer: The Wombats

The Wombats chronology
| The Wombats (2008) | This Acoustic Glitch (2011) | Glitterbug B-Sides (2015) |

This Acoustic Glitch is an EP by British indie rock band The Wombats, released in 2011. The EP was set as a free download on their web page. It includes acoustic versions of two songs from their second album This Modern Glitch.

== Track listing ==
All songs composed by The Wombats.

1. "Techno Fan" (acoustic) – 3:55
2. "Anti-D" (acoustic) – 4:44
