= The Wombats (EP) =

EP by The Wombats
- Released: 8 April 2008
- Genre: Indie Pop
- Length: 20:06
- Language: English
- Label: KIDS in America; Bright Antenna (US)

The Wombats EPs chronology
The Wombats Go Pop! Pop! Pop! (2007)	The Wombats (2008)	The Wombats Proudly Present: This Acoustic Glitch (2011)

The Wombats is a self-titled EP by the Wombats, released April 8, 2008. Distributed by KIDS in America and Bright Antenna. The EP was the first release by the band in the United States.

== Track listing ==
No.	Title	Length
1.	"Backfire at the Disco"	3:17
2.	"Kill the Director"	2:46
3.	"Moving to New York"	3:33
4.	"Little Miss Pipedream"	4:05
5.	"Lost in the Post"	3:12
6.	"Kill the Director [CSS Remix]"	3:13
