= Kid Astray =

Norwegian indie pop band

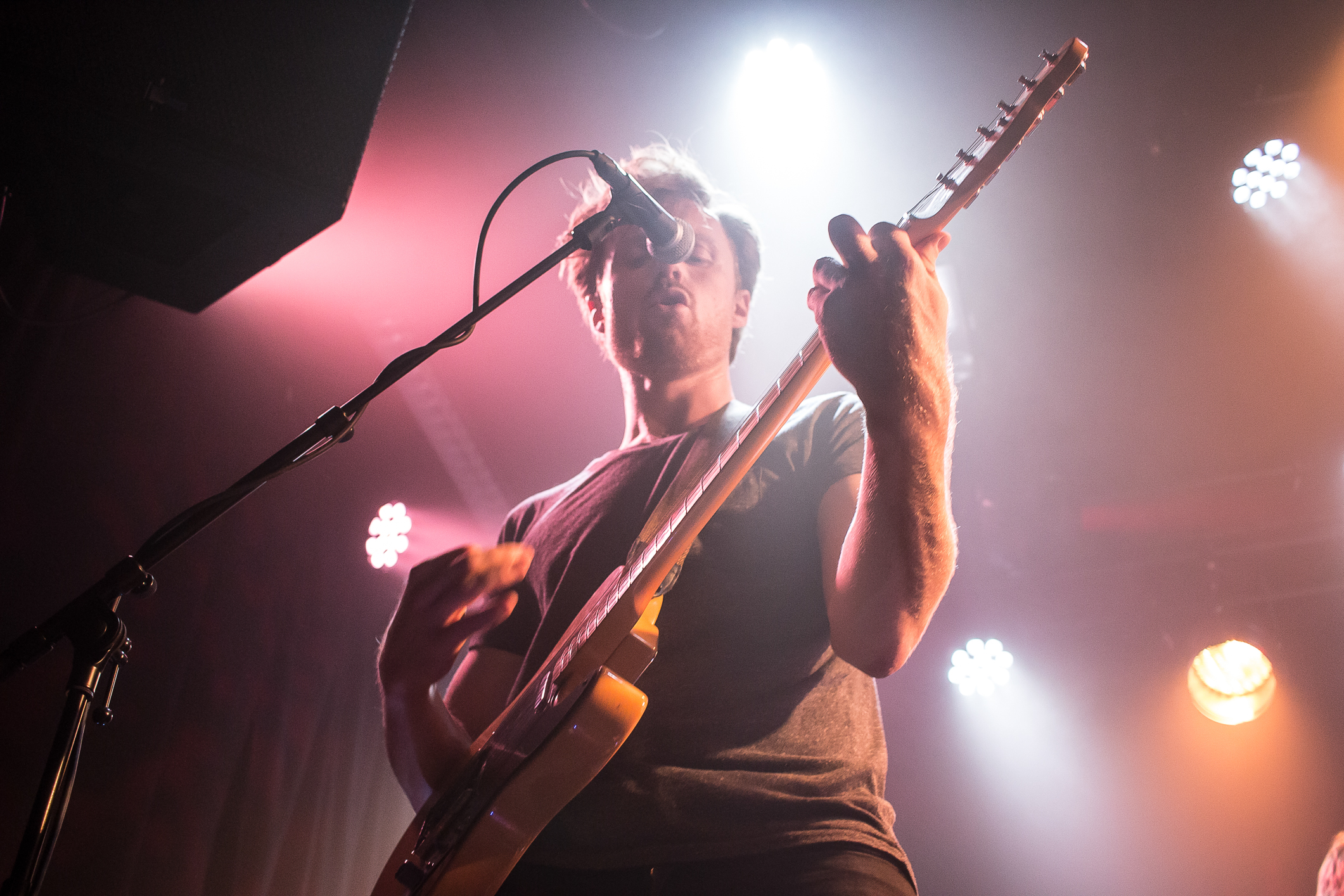

Background information
- Origin: Sandvika, Norway
- Genres: Alternative dance, indie rock, electronic, Indietronica
- Years active: 2013–present
- Labels: COSMOS Records
- Members: Benjamin Giørtz; Even Steine; Alex Meek; Jakob Bechmann; Håkon Carlin
- Past members: Elizabeth Wu
- Website: kidastray.com

Kid Astray is an indie pop band from Sandvika, Norway, consisting of Benjamin Giørtz, Elizabeth Wu, Even Steine, Alex Meek, Håkon Carlin, and Jakob Bechmann. The band was formed in 2010, when they met at the same music high school.

== History ==
The band's first big breakthrough was in October 2012, after they won "Band of The Week" on the radio station NRK P3, with their song "The Mess". The song was made because the band wanted to enter the demo contest held by the Norwegian festival by:Larm. The Mess was in heavy rotation at the Norwegian radio station P3, where it was playlisted in a duration of 28 weeks. The song was also playlisted at the alternative rock radio station Alt Nation on Sirius XM radio.

In April 2013, the band signed a record deal with the Nordic music label Cosmos Music (Cosmos Music Group). Their first single after being signed was "No Easy Way Out", which got playlisted on NRK P3 and NRK P1, as well as several other radio stations in other countries. The song was, together with "Taking You With Me", produced by Tord Øverland Knudsen (The Wombats) in Whitewood Recording Studio in Liverpool, with audio engineer Robert Whiteley. The EP from the recording sessions in Liverpool, "Taking You With Me EP", was released on June 23, 2014.

In May 2014, Kid Astray signed a deal with one of UK's major managements, Big Life Management (Snow Patrol, Wham!, Scissor Sisters, Bloc Party, The Verve), led by industry veterans Jazz Summers, Tim Parry and Scott Baker-Marflitt.

During the summer of 2014, Kid Astray travelled to Manchester to record their debut album with producer Joe Cross (Chlöe Howl, Hurts). They released two singles from their recording sessions in Manchester, which both got playlisted on Norwegian P3. "Back To The Ordinary" premiered at the popular music blog HillyDilly.com, and "Still Chasing Nothing" premiered on February 9 at Idolator.com.

Their debut album "Home Before the Dark" was released on March 16, 2015, in the Nordics, while the international release was on June 15.

== Members ==
- Benjamin Giørtz (born November 13, 1994) – vocals and synth/piano
- Elizabeth Wu (born September 8, 1994) – vocals and synth/piano
- Even Steine (born January 26, 1994) – guitar
- Alexander Meek (born January 16, 1994) – guitar
- Håkon Carlin (born January 16, 1994) – bass/synth
- Jakob Bechmann (born October 27, 1994) – drums and vocals

== Releases ==
- "The Mess" (2013)
- "Easily Led Astray" (2013)
- "No Easy Way Out" (2014)
- "Taking You With Me" (EP) (2014)
- "Back to the Ordinary" (2014)
- "Still Chasing Nothing" (Radio Edit) (2015)
- "It's Alright" (2015)
- "Cornerstone" (2015)
- "Home Before the Dark" - LP (2015)
- "Fall To My Knees" (2017)
- "Roads" (2017)
- "Joanne" (2018)
- "Are You Here?" (2018)
