= Oh! The Ocean =

2022 studio album by the Wombats

Studio album by The Wombats
- Released: 14 February 2025
- Genre: Indie rock
- Length: 42:16
- Label: AWAL
- Producer: John Congleton

The Wombats chronology
Is This What It Feels Like to Feel Like This? (2022)	Oh! The Ocean (2025)

The Wombats album chronology
Fix Yourself, Not the World (2022)	Oh! The Ocean (2025)

Singles from Oh! The Ocean
- 1. "Sorry I'm Late, I Didn't Want To Come" Released: 8 October 2024; 2. "Blood On The Hospital Floor" Released: 21 November 2024; 3. "My Head Is Not My Friend" Released: 17 December 2024; 4. "Can't Say No" Released: 15 January 2025

Professional ratings
Review scores
Source	Rating
Clash	8/10
New Noise Magazine	4/5 stars
PopMatters	3/10

Oh! The Ocean is the sixth studio album by English rock band the Wombats, released on 14 February 2025. It was preceded by the singles "Sorry I'm Late, I Didn't Want To Come", "Blood On The Hospital Floor", "My Head Is Not My Friend", and "Can't Say No". The album was supported by a tour throughout America, Europe, and Australia during 2025.

The album debuted at number 4 on the UK Albums and at number 1 on the UK Independent Albums charts .

== Track listing ==
Track listing
No.	Title	Writer(s)	Length
1.	"Sorry I'm Late, I Didn't Want To Come"	Matthew Murphy; Jorgen Ogden	3:19
2.	"Can't Say No"	Murphy; Eli Hirsch	3:12
3.	"Blood On The Hospital Floor"	Murphy; Dan Haggis; Tord Øverland Knudsen	3:06
4.	"Kate Moss"	Murphy	3:33
5.	"Gut-Punch"	Murphy; Josh Grant	3:28
6.	"My Head Is Not My Friend"	Murphy; Tim Randolph	3:56
7.	"I Love America And She Hates Me"	Murphy; Mike Malchicoff	3:39
8.	"The World's Not Out To Get Me, I Am"	Murphy; Joe Janiak	3:07
9.	"Grim Reaper"	Murphy; Randolph; Linus Hablot	3:04
10.	"Reality Is A Wild Ride"	Murphy; Haggis; Knudsen	3:17
11.	"Swerve 101"	Murphy	3:42
12.	"Lobster"	Murphy; Gianluca Buccellati	4:47
Total length:			42:16

== Charts ==
Chart performance for Oh! The Ocean
Chart (2025)	Peak position
Australian Albums (ARIA)	12
Scottish Albums (OCC)	7
UK Albums (OCC)	4
UK Independent Albums (OCC)	1
