= Emoticons (song) =

2015 single by The Wombats

Single by The Wombats

from the album Glitterbug
- Released: 28 September 2015
- Recorded: 2014
- Genre: Indie pop, psychedelic pop, synthpop, disco
- Length: 4:19
- Label: 14th Floor Records; Bright Antenna
- Songwriter(s): Matthew Murphy; Dan Haggis; Tord Øverland Knudsen
- Producer(s): Murphy; Haggis; Knudsen; Mark Crew

The Wombats singles chronology
"Be Your Shadow" (2015)	"Emoticons" (2015)	"Lemon to a Knife Fight" (2017)

"Emoticons" is a song by English indie rock band The Wombats. It was the fifth single to be released from their third album Glitterbug. Unlike previous Glitterbug singles, the music video for "Emoticons" heavily features the band themselves, performing at the Hordern Pavilion in Sydney.

== Track listing ==
Digital download
No.	Title	Length
1.	"Emoticons"	4:19

== Critical reception ==
IndieLondon gave the song four out of five stars, and named it single of the week. They said it "captures The Wombats' innate ability to contrast uplifting sounds with darker lyrical themes" and is "arguably the best release yet from the band's current album".
