= Your Body Is a Weapon =

Single by The Wombats

from the album Glitterbug
- Released: (United Kingdom) 2 October 2013 (United States) 3 December 2013
- Recorded: 2013
- Genre: Indie rock
- Length: 3:59
- Label: 14th Floor Records
- Songwriter(s): Dan Haggis, Tord Øverland Knudsen, Matthew Murphy

The Wombats singles chronology
"1996" (2011)	"Your Body Is a Weapon" (2013)	"Greek Tragedy" (2015)

"Your Body Is a Weapon" is a song by English indie rock band The Wombats. The single was released in the United Kingdom on 2 October 2013 after making its debut the night before on Zane Lowe's BBC Radio 1 show with an interview from lead singer Matthew Murphy. It is the lead single from the band's third album Glitterbug. The song came in at number 25 on Triple J's Hottest 100 of 2013.

== Track listing ==
Digital download
No.	Title	Length
1.	"Your Body Is a Weapon"	3:59

== Charts ==
Chart (2013)	Peak position
Australia (ARIA)	86
UK Singles (Official Charts Company)	129
