= Fix Yourself, Not the World =

2022 studio album by the Wombats

Studio album by the Wombats
- Released: 14 January 2022
- Studio: None (recorded remotely from London, Los Angeles, and Oslo)
- Genre: Post-punk; Britpop
- Length: 40:31
- Label: AWAL
- Producer: Gabe Simon; Jacknife Lee; Mark Crew; Mike Crossey; Paul Meany

The Wombats chronology
Beautiful People Will Ruin Your Life (2018)	Fix Yourself, Not the World (2022)	Is This What It Feels Like to Feel Like This? (2022)

The Wombats album chronology
Beautiful People Will Ruin Your Life (2018)	Fix Yourself, Not the World (2022)	Oh! The Ocean (2025)

Singles from Fix Yourself, Not the World
- 1. "Method to the Madness" Released: 26 May 2021; 2. "If You Ever Leave, I'm Coming with You" Released: 17 August 2021; 3. "Ready for the High" Released: 14 October 2021; 4. "Everything I Love Is Going to Die" Released: 15 November 2021

Fix Yourself, Not the World is the fifth studio album by English rock band the Wombats, released on 14 January 2022. It was preceded by the singles "Method to the Madness", "If You Ever Leave, I'm Coming with You", "Ready for the High", and "Everything I Love Is Going to Die". Music videos were also released for the tracks "This Car Drives All by Itself" and "Worry". The album was supported by a tour throughout America, Europe, and Australia during 2022.

The album debuted atop the UK Albums and UK Independent Albums charts with 13,812 units in its first week.

== Background and recording ==
The album began when all members were together in Los Angeles in 2019 and wrote several songs. It was then recorded remotely during several COVID-19 lockdowns beginning in 2020, with each band member in a different location: Matthew Murphy in Los Angeles, bassist Tord Øverland Knudsen in Oslo and drummer Dan Haggis in London. They made a plan each day before separately recording their parts and sending them on to the producers. Haggis said that the band "explored new genres and pushed ourselves further than ever musically" on the album.

== Cover art ==
The cover art for the album and its singles was created by German–American pixel art collective eBoy. Kai Vermehr of eBoy said that he "collected loose ideas" from Murphy and the other band members, and the artwork came together without having "a detailed plan" but through "more of a discovery process".

== Critical reception ==
Professional ratings
Aggregate scores
Source	Rating
AnyDecentMusic?	6.8/10
Metacritic	72/100
Review scores
Source	Rating
AllMusic	4/5 stars
Clash	8/10
The Guardian	3/5 stars
MusicOMH	3.5/5 stars
NME	4/5 stars
No Ripcord	2/10

At Metacritic, which assigns a normalised rating out of 100 to reviews from professional publications, the album received an average score of 72, based on 8 reviews, indicating "generally favorable" reviews. Aggregator AnyDecentMusic? gave it 6.8 out of 10, based on their assessment of the critical consensus.

== Track listing ==
Fix Yourself, Not the World track listing
No.	Title	Writer(s)	Producer(s)	Length
1.	"Flip Me Upside Down"	Matthew Murphy; Gabriel Edward Simon	Gabe Simon; Mark Crew	3:13
2.	"This Car Drives All by Itself"	Murphy; Garret "Jacknife" Lee	Lee	4:45
3.	"If You Ever Leave, I'm Coming with You"	Murphy; Timothy Randolph Edgar	Crew	2:49
4.	"Ready for the High"	Murphy; Dan Haggis; Tord Øverland Knudsen	Crew; The Wombats	4:05
5.	"Method to the Madness"	Murphy; Haggis; Knudsen	Crew; The Wombats	4:33
6.	"People Don't Change People, Time Does"	Murphy; Haggis; Knudsen	Crew; The Wombats	3:01
7.	"Everything I Love Is Going to Die"	Murphy; Luke Niccoli; Micah Premnath	Crew	3:20
8.	"Work Is Easy, Life Is Hard"	Murphy; Paul Meany	Meany	3:16
9.	"Wildfire"	Murphy; Haggis; Knudsen	Crew; The Wombats	3:29
10.	"Don't Poke the Bear"	Murphy; Haggis; Knudsen	Crew; The Wombats	3:07
11.	"Worry"	Murphy; Lee	Lee	3:10
12.	"Fix Yourself, Then the World (Reach Beyond Your Fingers)"	Murphy; Haggis; Knudsen	Crew; The Wombats	1:43
Total length:				40:31

== Personnel ==
- Greg Calbi – mastering
- Steve Fallone – mastering
- Mike Crossey – mixing
- Gabe Simon – engineering
- Jack Duxbury – engineering
- Jacknife Lee – engineering
- Jonas Jalhay – engineering
- Mark Crew – engineering
- Paul Meany – engineering
- The Wombats – engineering
- Kai Vermehr – cover illustration
- Steffen Sauerteig – cover illustration
- Svend Smital – cover illustration
- Antony Kitson – graphic design
- Stephen Sesso – assistance

== Charts ==
Chart performance for Fix Yourself, Not the World
Chart (2022)	Peak position
Australian Albums (ARIA)	2
Dutch Albums (Album Top 100)	89
German Albums (Offizielle Top 100)	38
Scottish Albums (OCC)	2
UK Albums (OCC)	1
UK Independent Albums (OCC)	1
