= Glitterbug B-Sides =

EP by The Wombats
- Released: 13 April 2015
- Genre: Indie rock, pop punk
- Length: 14:38
- Label: 14th Floor

The Wombats chronology
This Acoustic Glitch (2011)	Glitterbug B-Sides (2015)	Glitterbug (2015)

Glitterbug B-Sides is an EP by British indie rock band The Wombats, released in 2015. It consists of three B-sides and a remix from the recording of their album Glitterbug. The EP was released on 13 April 2015, the same day as Glitterbug, and was exclusive to HMV. It was later released digitally.

== Track listing ==
All songs composed by The Wombats. Lyrics by Matthew Murphy.

1. "Right Click Save" – 3:33
2. "21st Century Blues" – 3:33
3. "Wired Differently" – 3:38
4. "Greek Tragedy" (Bastille Remix) – 3:54
