= Beautiful People Will Ruin Your Life =

Studio album by the Wombats
- Released: 9 February 2018
- Studio: One Eyed Jack (London); The Pool (London); Assault & Battery 2 (London); Stable Studio (Arnhem)
- Genre: Pop rock
- Length: 38:43
- Label: 14th Floor (UK); Bright Antenna (US)
- Producer: Mark Crew; Dan Haggis; Tord Øverland Knudsen; Catherine Marks; Matthew Murphy

The Wombats chronology
Glitterbug (2015)	Beautiful People Will Ruin Your Life (2018)	Fix Yourself, Not the World (2022)

Singles from Beautiful People Will Ruin Your Life
- 1. "Lemon to a Knife Fight" Released: 7 November 2017; 2. "Turn" Released: 6 December 2017; 3. "Cheetah Tongue" Released: 18 January 2018; 4. "Black Flamingo" Released: 5 February 2018

Beautiful People Will Ruin Your Life is the fourth major studio album by British rock band the Wombats. The album was released on 9 February 2018. The first single from the album, "Lemon to a Knife Fight", was released on 7 November 2017. This was followed by "Turn", "Cheetah Tongue", and "Black Flamingo".

== Reception ==
Professional ratings
Aggregate scores
Source	Rating
Metacritic	71/100
Review scores
Source	Rating
AllMusic	3.5/5 stars
musicOMH	3/5 stars
NME	3/5 stars
PopMatters	8/10 stars
The Times	2/5 stars

Beautiful People Will Ruin Your Life received positive reviews from critics, with NME saying "there's nothing groundbreaking here, but little to be ashamed of either." In a positive review, PopMatters describes the album's songs as "excellent workouts in powerful pop-rock."

== Track listing ==
Beautiful People Will Ruin Your Life – Standard edition
No.	Title	Writer(s)	Length
1.	"Cheetah Tongue"	Matthew Murphy; Jennifer Decilveo	3:39
2.	"Lemon to a Knife Fight"	Murphy; Matt Radd	3:26
3.	"Turn"	Murphy; Blake Harnage; Micah Premnath	3:28
4.	"Black Flamingo"	Murphy; Daniel Haggis; Tord Øverland Knudsen	3:21
5.	"White Eyes"	Murphy; Decilveo	4:13
6.	"Lethal Combination"	Murphy; Jacob Sinclair	2:39
7.	"Out of My Head"	Murphy; Timothy Pagnotta	3:02
8.	"I Only Wear Black"	Murphy; Benjamin Freelander; Sinclair	3:11
9.	"Ice Cream"	Murphy; Haggis; Knudsen	3:44
10.	"Dip You in Honey"	Murphy; Haggis; Knudsen	3:08
11.	"I Don't Know Why I Like You but I Do"	Murphy; Haggis; Knudsen	3:50
Total length:			38:43

Beautiful People Will Ruin Your Life – Extended Version
No.	Title	Writer(s)	Length
12.	"Bee-Sting"	Murphy; Harnage; Premnath	3:34
13.	"Oceans"	Murphy; Haggis; Knudsen	3:41
14.	"Lethal Combination" (Acoustic)	Murphy; Sinclair	2:41
Total length:			47:37

Japanese bonus tracks
No.	Title	Writer(s)	Length
12.	"Lethal Combination" (Acoustic)	Murphy; Sinclair	2:41
13.	"Lemon to a Knife Fight" (Acoustic)	Murphy; Radd	3:42
14.	"Lemon to a Knife Fight" (Acoustic)	Murphy; Radd	3:30
Total length:			48:50

== Personnel ==
The Wombats

- Matthew Murphy – lead vocals, guitars, keyboards, production, recording
- Dan Haggis – drums, percussion, keyboards, guitars, backing vocals, production, recording
- Tord Øverland Knudsen – bass guitar, keyboards, backing vocals, production, recording

Additional contributors

- Mark Crew – production, recording (all tracks); keyboards, programming (tracks 1, 2, 5–8)
- Catherine Marks – production, recording (all tracks), programming (1, 2, 3, 5, 7, 9, 11)
- Vlado Meller – mastering
- Rich Costey – mixing
- Rob Whiteley – engineering
- Adam "Cecil" Bartlett – engineering (2, 3)
- Martin Cooke – mixing assistance
- Nicolas Fournier – mixing assistance
- Richie Kennedy – engineering assistance (2, 3)
- Marius Drogsås Hagen – guitar (3)
- Kianjia – vocals (5)
- Lucas Donaud – artwork, design

== Charts ==
Chart (2018)	Peak position
Australian Albums (ARIA)	5
Austrian Albums (Ö3 Austria)	55
Belgian Albums (Ultratop Flanders)	75
Dutch Albums (Album Top 100)	67
German Albums (Offizielle Top 100)	39
Norwegian Albums (VG-lista)	19
Swiss Albums (Schweizer Hitparade)	57
UK Albums (OCC)	3
US Billboard 200	190

== Certifications ==
Certifications for Beautiful People Will Ruin Your Life
Region	Certification	Certified units/sales
United Kingdom (BPI)	Gold	100,000^{‡}
^{‡} Sales+streaming figures based on certification alone.
