= The Wombats Go Pop! Pop! Pop! =

EP by The Wombats
- Released: 2007
- Length: 15:11

The Wombats chronology
Girls, Boys and Marsupials (2006)	The Wombats Go Pop! Pop! Pop! (2007)	The Wombats Proudly Present: A Guide to Love, Loss & Desperation (2007)

The Wombats Go Pop! Pop! Pop! is an EP by British rock band The Wombats, released in 2007. It is the second album to be exclusively released in Japan. It is made up of two of the Wombats previously released singles and various B-Sides not found on the previously released album The Wombats Proudly Present: A Guide to Love, Loss & Desperation.

== Track listing ==
All songs composed by The Wombats

1. "Kill the Director" – 2:44
2. "Backfire at the Disco" – 3:14
3. "Dr. Suzanne Mattox (BBC Radio 1 Session)" – 2:53
4. "School Uniforms (Demo)" – 3:08
5. "Kill The Director (CSS Remix)" – 3:12
