= Finn Askew =

British singer

- Born: Samuel Finn Valler Askew; 21 May 2001 (age 25); Wellington, Somerset, England
- Genres: Indie, pop, R&B
- Label: Polydor

Samuel Finn Valler Askew (born May 21, 2001) is a British musician from Wellington in south-west England.

Finn cites American hip-hop acts such as Juice Wrld and Lil Peep as music influences of his sound though he fell in love with music after uncovering his parents' CDs, a mixture of Nirvana, the Smiths, and the Beach Boys. Finn's music is described as an "indie sound, washed one moment in a rosy hue of pop and the next polished to a high, RnB sheen."

== Career ==
Finn Askew's debut single "Roses" was created and recorded when he was 16. He got the beat from YouTube and used GarageBand and his £20 microphone to create it. "Roses" featured in a live stream on V Live from Taeyong (member of K-pop band NCT). As a result the track was included in the Spotify viral charts in a number of southeast Asian countries and has over 12 million streams on Spotify alone.

Finn released his debut EP Peach, which combines lo-fi hip-hop, piano jazz and indie rock, in January 2021.

Finn Askew was listed as one of Vevo Dscvr's Artists to Watch for 2021.

== Discography ==
=== Extended plays ===
- Peach (22 January 2021)
- Tokyo (5 November 2021)

=== Singles ===
Title	Year	Peak chart positions		Album or EP
Title	Year	UK	NZ Hot	Album or EP
"Roses"	2020	—	—	Peach
"Same Old Love"	2020	—	—	Peach
"Cherry Bomb"	2021	—	—	Tokyo
"Paranoia"	2021	—	—	Tokyo
"Adidas"	2021	—	—	Tokyo
"Lavish"	2021	—	—	Non-album singles
"Used to This"	2023	—	—	Non-album singles
"Perfect Colour"	2023	—	—	Non-album singles
"Homesick"	2023	—	—	Non-album singles
"Aftertaste"	2024	—	—	Non-album singles
"16 Dogs"	2024	—	—	Non-album singles
"Space 4 2"	2024	—	—	Non-album singles
"Christmas Song"	2024	—	—	Non-album singles
"Music All Over Her Body"	2026	91	12	Non-album singles
