= Greek Tragedy (song) =

Single by the Wombats

from the album Glitterbug
- Released: 14 January 2015
- Recorded: 2014
- Genre: Alternative rock; Indie pop; synthpop
- Length: 3:29
- Label: 14th Floor
- Songwriters: Matthew Murphy; Dan Haggis; Tord Øverland Knudsen
- Producers: Murphy; Haggis; Knudsen; Mark Crew

The Wombats singles chronology
"Your Body Is a Weapon" (2013)	"Greek Tragedy" (2015)	"Give Me a Try" (2015)

Music video
- "Greek Tragedy" on YouTube

"Greek Tragedy" is a song from indie rock band the Wombats. The track was released in the United Kingdom on 14 January 2015 as the second single from the band's third studio album, Glitterbug (2015). "Greek Tragedy" was written and produced by band members Matthew Murphy, Dan Haggis, and Tord Øverland Knudsen, with Mark Crew also producing. The track received its premiere on BBC Radio 1 when it featured as Zane Lowe's Hottest Record in the World on 14 January. An official remix of the track by British band Bastille was released on 27 January 2015. In 2020, Swedish music producer Oliver Nelson released a remixed version on the social media platform TikTok. This remix became a viral sleeper hit, renewing popularity for the original 2015 version on streaming platform, Spotify. In January 2021, the Wombats released an official music video for the remix, the video was created by Australian animator Jamie Mac.

== Music video ==
Directed by Finn Keenan, the accompanying music video for "Greek Tragedy" premiered on YouTube on 15 January 2015. The video follows a young woman, portrayed by April Pearson, who becomes obsessed with the Wombats, culminating in her stalking and eventually murdering all of them. She then takes them to a warehouse and sets their corpses up like marionettes. The band credited Keenan for imagining the concept of the video. Knudsen said "it is refreshing sometimes to get a different sight on the song ... the video is not really what the song is about", and Haggis elaborated that "It’s not actually about a stalker – fortunately that’s not reality."

== Track listing ==
Digital download
No.	Title	Length
1.	"Greek Tragedy"	3:29

== Charts ==
Chart (2015)	Peak position
Australia (ARIA)	61
Belgium (Ultratip Bubbling Under Flanders)	62
Czech Republic Airplay (ČNS IFPI)	64
Finland Airplay (Radiosoittolista)	97
Hungary (Single Top 40)	34
UK Singles (Official Charts)	158
US Alternative Airplay (Billboard)	32
US Hot Rock & Alternative Songs (Billboard)	47

== Certifications ==
Region	Certification	Certified units/sales
United Kingdom (BPI)	Platinum	600,000^{‡}
United States (RIAA)	Gold	500,000^{‡}
^{‡} Sales+streaming figures based on certification alone.

== Release history ==
Region	Date	Format
Worldwide	14 January 2015	Digital download
