= Be Your Shadow =

Single by The Wombats

from the album Glitterbug
- Released: 23 May 2015
- Recorded: 2014
- Genre: Indie
- Length: 3:35
- Label: 14th Floor Records; Bright Antenna
- Songwriter(s): Matthew Murphy; Dan Haggis; Tord Øverland-Knudsen
- Producer(s): Mark Crew

The Wombats singles chronology
"Give Me a Try" (2015)	"Be Your Shadow" (2015)	"Emoticons" (2015)

Music video
- "Be Your Shadow" on YouTube

"Be Your Shadow" is a song by Liverpudlian indie band The Wombats. It was the fourth single to be released from their third album Glitterbug. The music video premiered on Soccer AM on 23 May 2015. Following on from the pattern of Glitterbug's previous singles, "Be Your Shadow" does not have any B-sides.

== Track listing ==
Digital download
No.	Title	Length
1.	"Be Your Shadow"	3:36
