= Give Me a Try (song) =

"Give Me A Try"

Single by The Wombats

from the album Glitterbug
- Released: 13 April 2015
- Recorded: 2014
- Genre: Indie rock, synthpop
- Length: 3:48
- Label: 14th Floor Records; Bright Antenna
- Songwriter(s): Matthew Murphy; Dan Haggis; Tord Øverland-Knudsen
- Producer(s): Mark Crew

The Wombats singles chronology
"Greek Tragedy" (2015)	"Give Me A Try" (2015)	"Be Your Shadow" (2015)

Music video
- "Give Me A Try" on YouTube

"Give Me A Try" is a song by British indie band The Wombats. It was the third single to be released from their third album Glitterbug. The song premiered as Zane Lowe's Hottest Record in the World on Radio 1 on March 3, 2015. It is their most recent entry on the UK Singles chart.

== Track listing ==
Digital download
No.	Title	Length
1.	"Give Me A Try"	3:47

== Critical reception ==
IndieLondon gave the song a positive review, saying:

"It’s a song brimming with hope and positivity, and finds Murph’s vocals in soaring form, while echoed electronic arrangements and wall of noise guitars reverberate in the background. It all adds up to create a thrilling whole and is another rip-roaring example of why Glitterbug is now keenly anticipated."

== Charts ==
Chart (2015)	Peak position
UK Singles (Official Charts Company)	163
Canada Rock (Billboard)	45
US Alternative Airplay (Billboard)	19
US Rock & Alternative Airplay (Billboard)	27
