= Glitterbug (album) =

Studio album by the Wombats
- Released: 13 April 2015
- Studios: Unit 24 (Battersea); The Wombats Burrow (Liverpool); The Pool (London); Whitewood (Liverpool); Barefoot B (Hollywood)
- Genres: Indie rock; post-punk; new wave; synth-pop; alternative dance
- Length: 39:31
- Labels: 14th Floor, Bright Antenna (US)
- Producers: Matthew Murphy; Dan Haggis; Tord Øverland Knudsen; Mark Crew; Eric Valentine

The Wombats chronology
This Modern Glitch (2011)	Glitterbug (2015)	Beautiful People Will Ruin Your Life (2018)

Singles from Glitterbug
- 1. "Your Body Is a Weapon" Released: 2 October 2013; 2. "Greek Tragedy" Released: 14 January 2015; 3. "Give Me a Try" Released: 11 March 2015; 4. "Be Your Shadow" Released: 23 May 2015; 5. "Emoticons" Released: 28 September 2015

Glitterbug is the third major studio album by British rock band the Wombats. The album was produced by Mark Crew alongside the band, and was released on 13 April 2015. The first single from the album, "Your Body Is a Weapon", was released on iTunes on 2 October 2013 in the United Kingdom and 3 December in the United States. This was followed by "Greek Tragedy", "Give Me a Try", "Be Your Shadow" and "Emoticons". To celebrate the album's release, the Glitterbug B Sides EP was released on the same day. The album entered the UK charts at number 5 and reached number 2 in Australia, as well as charting at number 91 in the US, becoming the band's first to appear on the Billboard 200. The band supported the album with their Glitterbug Tour 2015.

== Reception ==
Professional ratings
Aggregate scores
Source	Rating
Metacritic	58/100
Review scores
Source	Rating
AllMusic	4/5 stars
DIY	2/5 stars
The Guardian	3/5 stars
Exclaim!	7/10
The Irish Times	2/5 stars
NME	6/10
Pitchfork Media	5.7/10
Renowned for Sound	4.5/5 stars
Rolling Stone Australia	2.5/5 stars

Glitterbug has received mixed reviews from critics, with XFM describing it as "outstanding" and "full of wit, heart and huge singalong choruses". It has also been described as The Wombats' "finest album to date". Rolling Stone gave the album a positive review, singling out "The English Summer" and "Isabel" as "terrific". Renowned for Sound claims that The Wombats "don't step wrong once, with every song having a particular merit to it that makes it worth repeating again and again." Rebecca M. Williams of Exclaim! wrote that "while their approach is a little aggressive at times, making it a little too much to take in at once, Glitterbug is full of tracks that prove there's no reason not to indulge in it." However, Michael Hann from The Guardian described the album as "desperately un-involving."

Glitterbug was named one of the best 30 albums of 2015 by Radio X.

== Track listing ==
All tracks written by Matthew Murphy. All tracks produced by Murphy, Dan Haggis, Tord Øverland Knudsen, and Mark Crew, except "Your Body Is A Weapon", produced by Murphy, Haggis, Knudsen, and Eric Valentine.

No.	Title	Length
1.	"Emoticons"	4:19
2.	"Give Me a Try"	3:48
3.	"Greek Tragedy"	3:29
4.	"Be Your Shadow"	3:35
5.	"Headspace"	3:54
6.	"This Is Not a Party"	2:59
7.	"Isabel"	3:29
8.	"Your Body Is a Weapon"	3:57
9.	"The English Summer"	2:36
10.	"Pink Lemonade"	3:46
11.	"Curveballs"	3:39
Total length:		39:31

Bonus tracks
No.	Title	Length
12.	"Sex and Question Marks"	2:18
13.	"Flowerball"	3:47

HMV exclusive B-sides EP
No.	Title	Length
1.	"Right Click Save"	3:35
2.	"21st Century Blues"	3:32
3.	"Wired Differently"	3:37
4.	"Greek Tragedy" (Bastille Remix)	3:54

== Personnel ==
Credits adapted from the album's liner notes.

- Matthew Murphy – lead vocals, guitars, keyboards, production
- Dan Haggis – drums, percussion, keyboards, guitars, backing vocals, production
- Tord Øverland Knudsen – bass guitar, keyboards, backing vocals, production
- Mark Crew – production and recording on all tracks except "Your Body Is a Weapon"
- Eric Valentine – production and recording on "Your Body Is a Weapon"
- Oliver Nelson – additional production on "This Is Not a Party"
- Manny Marroquin – audio mixing
- Stephen Marcussen – audio mastering
- Alex Gilbert – A&R
- Jeffrey P. Chang – A&R assistant
- Conor O'Mahony – coordination
- Storm Yeechong – coordination
- Samuel Burgess-Johnson – artwork
- Darren Oorloff – artwork
- Dan Priddy – recording assistant to Mark Crew
- Cian Riordan – recording assistant to Eric Valentine
- Chris Galland – mixing assistant
- Ike Schultz – mixing assistant
- Jeff Jackson – mixing assistant
- Willy Scooby – additional recording
- Zorg Albini – additional recording
- Jon Sagis – additional recording
- Darren Jones – recording assistant to Jon Sagis
- Robert Whitely – additional recording
- Justin Long – additional recording

== Charts ==
=== Weekly charts ===
Chart (2015)	Peak position
Australian Albums (ARIA)	2
Austrian Albums (Ö3 Austria)	62
Belgian Albums (Ultratop Flanders)	151
Dutch Albums (Album Top 100)	89
German Albums (Offizielle Top 100)	30
Hungarian Albums (MAHASZ)	34
Scottish Albums (Official Charts)	10
Swiss Albums (Schweizer Hitparade)	74
UK Albums (Official Charts)	5
US Billboard 200	91
US Top Alternative Albums (Billboard)	13
US Independent Albums (Billboard)	5
US Top Rock Albums (Billboard)	16

=== Year-end charts ===
Chart (2015)	Position
Australia (ARIA)	60

== Certifications ==
Region	Certification	Certified units/sales
United Kingdom (BPI)	Gold	100,000^{‡}
^{‡} Sales+streaming figures based on certification alone.
