= Matthew Murphy =

English musician

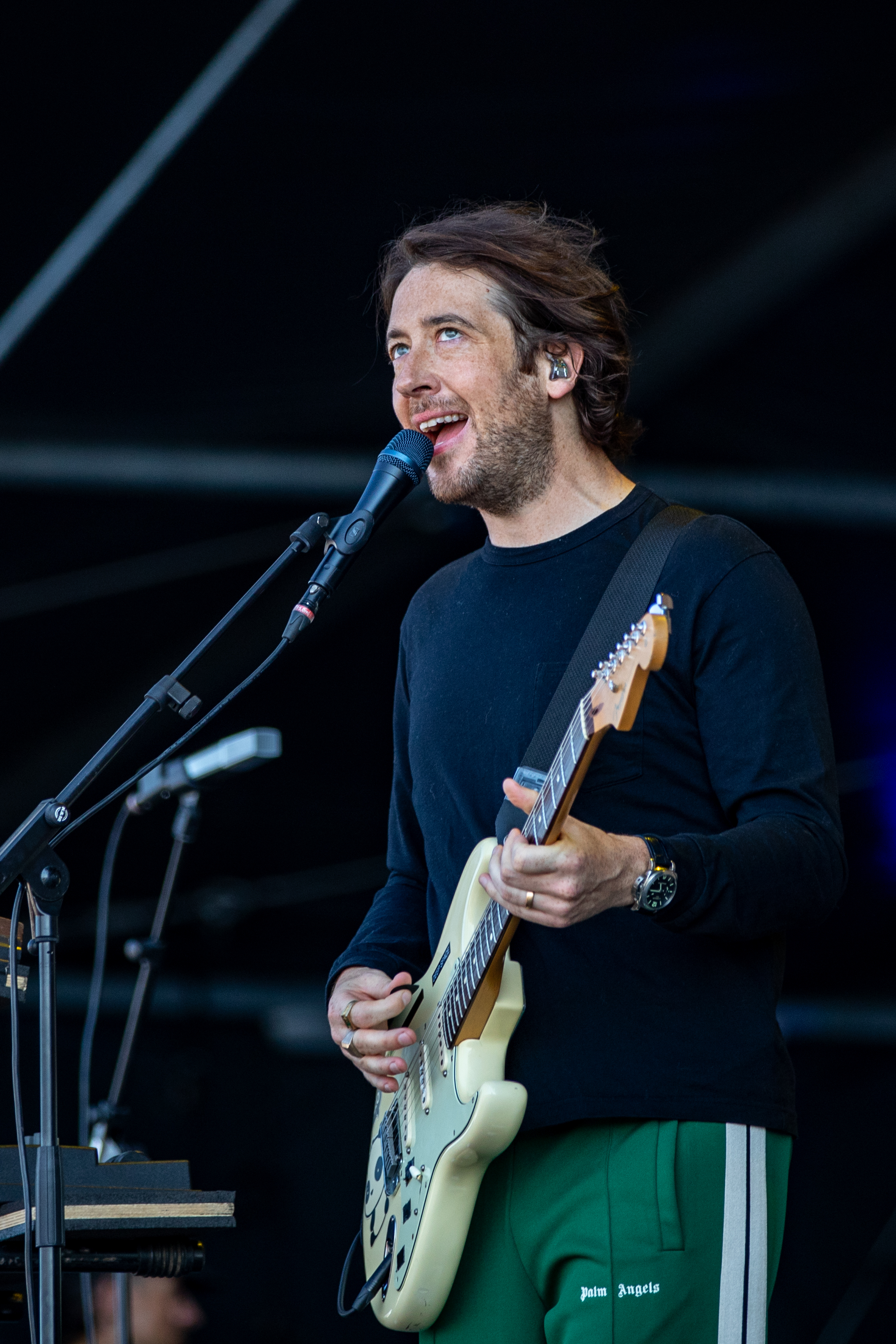
- Murphy performing at Southside Festival in 2025
- Born: 23 July 1984 (age 42); Liverpool, England
- Other name: Murph
- Occupations: Musician; singer; songwriter
- Years active: 2003–present
- Spouse: Akemi Topel (m. 2017)
- Children: 2
- Musical career
- Genres: Indie rock; pop rock
- Instruments: Vocals; guitar; bass; keyboards
- Label: 14th Floor
- Member of: The Wombats; Love Fame Tragedy

Matthew Edward Murphy (born 23 July 1984), nicknamed Murph, is an English musician, singer, and songwriter. He is best known as the lead vocalist, guitarist, and primary songwriter of The Wombats, which he co-founded in 2003. He began a solo career under the name Love Fame Tragedy in 2018.

== Early life ==
Matthew Edward Murphy was born in the Woolton suburb of Liverpool on 23 July 1984. His mother worked as a higher executive officer for the Civil Service, while his father was a chartered engineer and senior electrical and electronic engineering lecturer who later became an IT consultant specialising in automated software testing. He has said that he "didn't come from money, but didn't have very humble beginnings either". He began playing the guitar at the age of five, primarily at the behest of his father, and joined his first band at the age of 13. He attended Liverpool College in the neighbouring suburb of Mossley Hill, where he "smoked a lot of weed all the time and played in a lot of weird bands" and just barely managed to earn his A-levels. He later studied music at the Liverpool Institute for Performing Arts (LIPA), where he gained a BA and met his future Wombats bandmates; having suffered from depression and anxiety since his teenage years, he was prescribed antidepressants after experiencing severe panic attacks at LIPA, which led him to detail his issues with the medication in the Wombats song "Anti-D".

== Career ==
=== The Wombats ===
Murphy is the lead singer and guitarist of rock trio The Wombats, alongside Norwegian bassist Tord Øverland Knudsen and fellow Liverpool native Dan Haggis on drums. They have said that the band began as "a joke [they] didn't want anyone to find funny". The band was initially launched when LIPA gave them the chance to play various gigs. They then ended up gaining radio play in the UK with songs such as "Let's Dance to Joy Division" and "Moving to New York". Their first album, A Guide to Love, Loss & Desperation, was released on 5 November 2007 with success following a European tour and an Arbor Day party at Liverpool Academy. The album achieved platinum status in the UK.

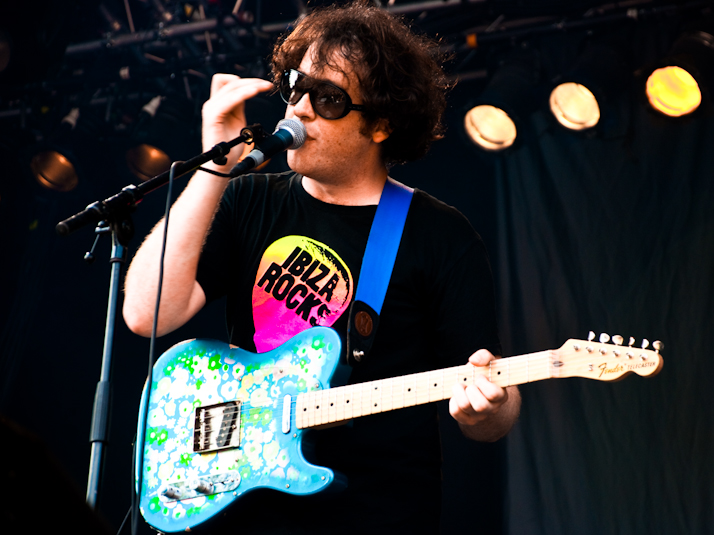
Murphy performing in July 2009

The Wombats appeared in a 2008 episode of the Australian music quiz show Spicks and Specks, on which Murphy was a contestant; later in the episode, he appeared with his Wombats bandmates in a segment where bassist Knudsen sang the Postman Pat theme song in his native Norwegian. That same year, the band performed a cover of Leona Lewis' song "Bleeding Love" at the MTV Europe Music Awards and their own song "Jump into the Fog" on an episode of The Tonight Show with Jay Leno.

The band's second album, This Modern Glitch, was released on 25 April 2011 and was a chart success, reaching No. 3 in the UK and No. 2 in Australia. The band released their third album, Glitterbug, on 13 April 2015; reviews were mixed, though it became the band's first album to appear on the U.S. Billboard 200, where it peaked at No. 91. To promote the album, they appeared on Late Night with Seth Meyers to perform "Greek Tragedy" on 28 April. Their fourth album, Beautiful People Will Ruin Your Life, was released on 9 February 2018 to positive reviews. Their fifth studio album, titled Fix Yourself, Not the World, was released on 14 January 2022 and reached the top spot in the UK Albums Chart, becoming their first UK No. 1 album. Their sixth studio album, titled Oh! The Ocean, was released on February 14th, 2025 to positive reviews.

=== Love Fame Tragedy ===
In 2018, Murphy revealed that he had written 20 new tracks for a new album called I Don't Want to Play the Victim, But I'm Really Good at It. In June 2019, he announced that the album would be released under a new solo project by the name of Love Fame Tragedy, alongside a tour announcement and a debut single called "My Cheating Heart". The debut EP was produced by Mark Crew and released in September 2019 to generally positive reviews. In March 2020, he released the EP Five Songs to Briefly Fill the Void. Four months later, he released the debut Love Fame Tragedy studio album Wherever I Go, I Want to Leave to positive reviews. The second Love Fame Tragedy studio album, Life Is a Killer, was released on 29 March 2024.

== Personal life ==
Murphy married Japanese-American hotel manager Akemi Topel on 7 October 2017. They live in the Mount Washington neighbourhood of Los Angeles, and have two daughters named Dylan (born May 2019) and Kai (born January 2021).

While his Wombats bandmates are avid football fans, with drummer Dan Haggis supporting the band's hometown team Everton FC and bassist Tord Øverland Knudsen supporting Manchester United FC, Murphy prefers to play golf and has never specified a preferred football team. However, in a May 2020 fundraising video on Everton's YouTube channel during the COVID-19 pandemic, Murphy and Haggis were described as "top Everton-supporting artists". Their section of the video featured them performing Wombats songs, with all donations going to a campaign set up by Everton to provide support to people who had been made vulnerable and isolated by the pandemic.

== Discography ==
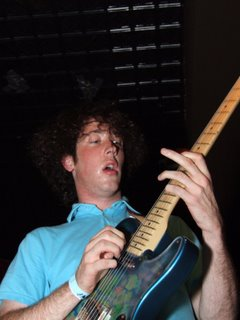
Murphy performing in March 2008

=== Studio albums ===
- A Guide to Love, Loss & Desperation (2007)
- This Modern Glitch (2011)
- Glitterbug (2015)
- Beautiful People Will Ruin Your Life (2018)
- Fix Yourself, Not the World (2022)
- Oh! The Ocean (2025)

=== Love Fame Tragedy ===
==== Studio albums ====
List of studio albums
Title	Details
Wherever I Go, I Want to Leave	Released: 10 July 2020; Label: Good Soldier Records; Format: Digital download, streaming
Life Is a Killer	Released: 29 March 2024; Label: Bright Antenna Records; Format: Digital download, streaming

==== Extended plays ====
List of EPs, with release date and label shown
Title	Details
I Don't Want to Play the Victim, But I'm Really Good at It	Released: 27 September 2019; Label: Good Soldier Records; Format: Digital download, streaming
Five Songs to Briefly Fill the Void	Released: 21 March 2020; Label: Good Soldier Records; Format: Digital download, streaming

==== Singles ====
List of singles, with year released and album shown
Title	Year	Peak chart positions	Album
Title	Year	UK Sales	Album
"My Cheating Heart"	2019	6	I Don't Want to Play the Victim, But I'm Really Good at It
"Brand New Brain"	2019	—	I Don't Want to Play the Victim, But I'm Really Good at It
"Backflip"	2019	—	I Don't Want to Play the Victim, But I'm Really Good at It
"Body Parts"	2019	—	Five Songs to Briefly Fill the Void
"Hardcore"	2019	—	Five Songs to Briefly Fill the Void
"Riding a Wave"	2020	—	Five Songs to Briefly Fill the Void
"Please Don't Murder Me (Part 2)"	2020	—	Five Songs to Briefly Fill the Void
"Multiply" (featuring Jack River)	2020	—	Five Songs to Briefly Fill the Void
"5150"	2020	—	Wherever I Go, I Want to Leave
"Everything Affects Me Now"	2020	—	Wherever I Go, I Want to Leave
"Don't You Want to Sleep With Someone Normal?"	2024	—	Life Is a Killer
