= The Wombats =

English indie rock band

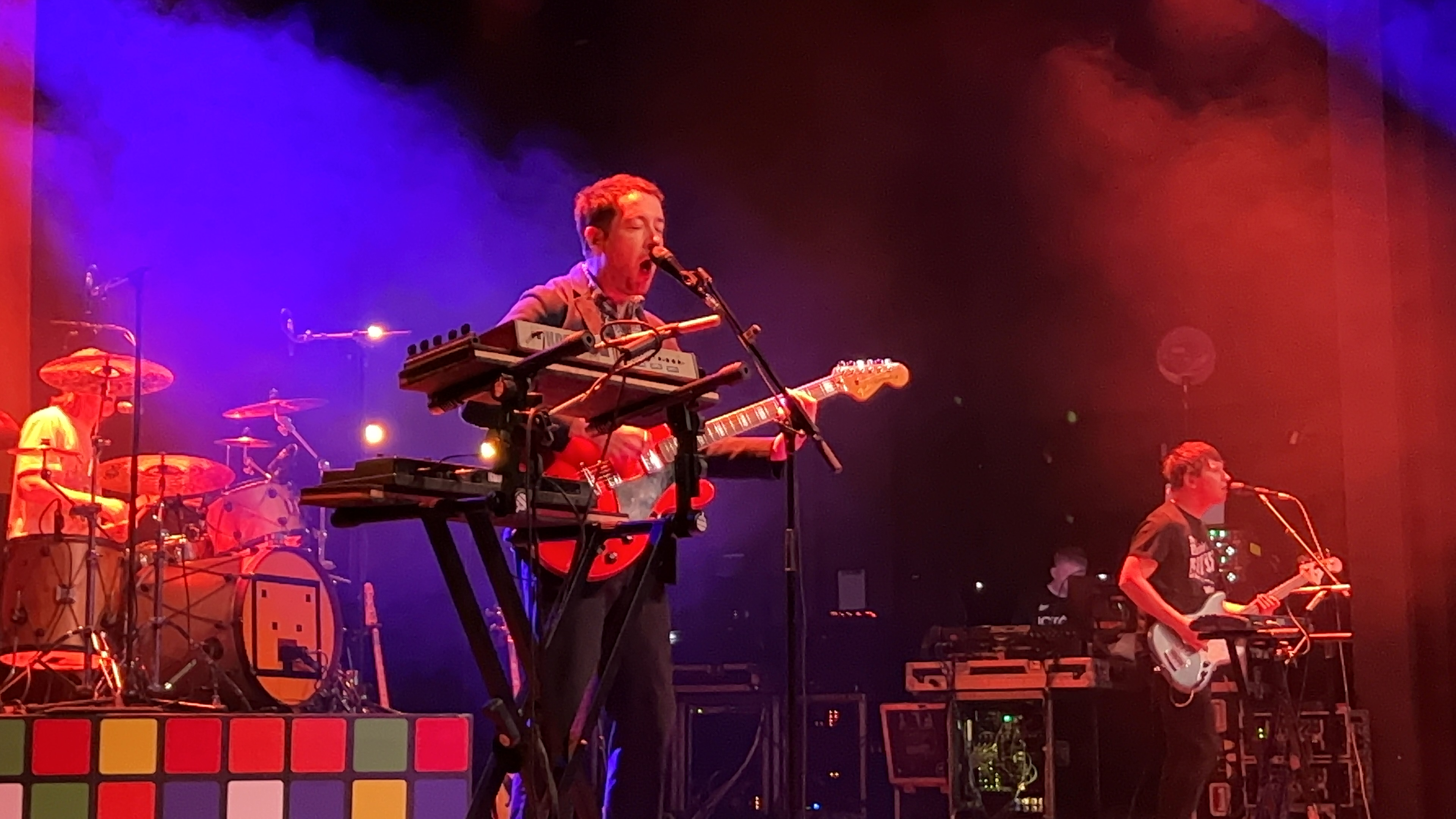
- The Wombats performing in 2022; from left to right: Dan Haggis, Matthew Murphy, and Tord Øverland Knudsen

Background information
- Origin: Liverpool, England
- Genres: Indie rock; indie pop; new wave; pop rock; post-punk revival
- Years active: 2003–present
- Labels: 14th Floor; Bright Antenna
- Members: Matthew Murphy; Tord Øverland Knudsen; Dan Haggis
- Website: thewombats.co.uk

The Wombats are an English indie rock band formed in Liverpool in 2003, consisting of Matthew Murphy (lead vocals, guitar, keyboards), Tord Øverland Knudsen (bass, backing vocals, keyboards), and Dan Haggis (drums, backing vocals, keyboards).

The Wombats released several EPs before working on their first full-length album Girls, Boys and Marsupials (2006), which was released only in Japan and featured some tracks that would reappear on their major-label debut studio album A Guide to Love, Loss & Desperation (2007). After releasing a self-titled EP in 2008 and touring for three years, they released the studio albums This Modern Glitch (2011), Glitterbug (2015), and Beautiful People Will Ruin Your Life (2018), all of which received mostly positive reviews. Their fifth album Fix Yourself, Not the World (2022) became their first No. 1 album, topping the UK Albums Chart within a week of release.

== History ==
=== Early years and debut album (2003–2008) ===
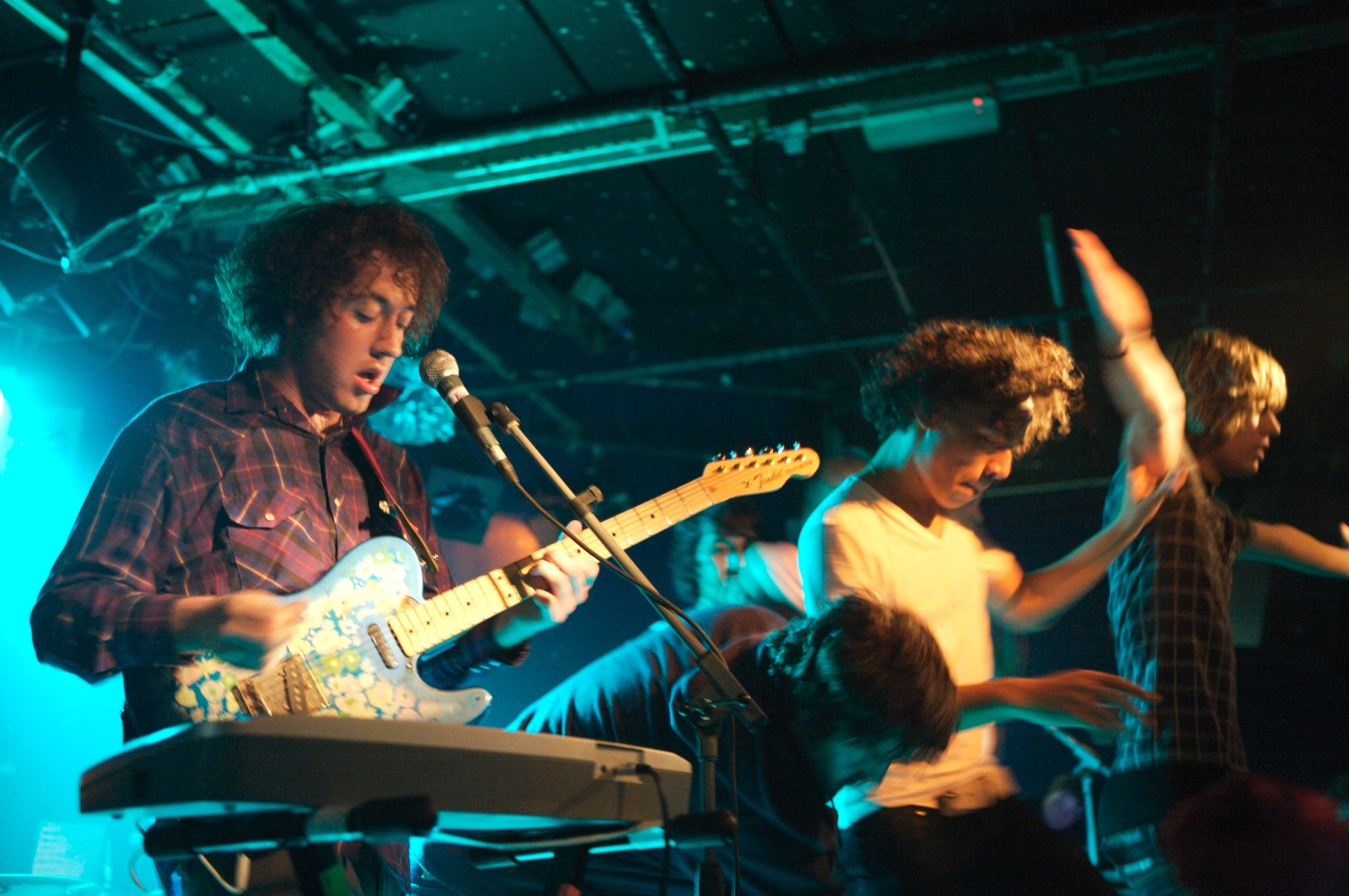
The Wombats performing in 2007

The trio met as teenagers in 2003 while studying at the Liverpool Institute for Performing Arts. Lead singer and guitarist Matthew Murphy and drummer Dan Haggis are both from Liverpool, with Murphy having grown up in Woolton and Haggis having grown up in Garston, while bassist Tord Øverland Knudsen is a Norwegian immigrant from Elverum. Over the course of 2004 to 2005, the band released many EPs such as The Hangover Sessions, No.3, and The Daring Adventures of Sgt. Wimbo and His Pet Otter. Their first official release was Lost in the Post, which was issued as a limited edition 7" single on 10 July 2006 on the London-based indie label KIDS Records and came with a distinctive additional second sleeve in the form of a FedEx ("WomEx") package. In 2006, the band's first album, Girls, Boys and Marsupials, was released solely in Japan.

In January 2007, the band released a second limited edition 7" on KIDS called Moving to New York (again featuring a second sleeve, this time in the style of a suitcase), then in May that year they released a third single on KIDS entitled "Backfire at the Disco", which reached No. 35 on the UK Singles Chart. This was followed by the band's first full single after signing to 14th Floor Records, "Kill the Director", in late July. Their debut album, A Guide to Love, Loss & Desperation, coincided with the release of "Let's Dance to Joy Division" (widely regarded as the band's signature song) in October 2007 and peaked at No. 11 on the UK Albums Chart. It was followed by a European tour ending with a Thanksgiving party at Liverpool Academy.

The band started 2008 as the opening act at the opening ceremony of Liverpool's European Capital of Culture celebrations at Liverpool Arena. The single "Moving to New York" was re-released on 14 January 2008 and reached No. 13 on the UK Singles Chart, becoming their highest charting release to date. At the 2008 NME Awards, the band was awarded "Best Dancefloor Filler" for their single "Let's Dance to Joy Division".

=== The Wombats EP (2008–2010) ===
In April 2008, the band put out their first U.S. release on the Bright Antenna label, The Wombats EP. Following this release, the band went on a full UK tour as well as playing dates in Europe and Japan. The band also played for Jo Whiley on BBC Radio 1, covering the Take That song "Patience" and the Postman Pat theme song, which bassist Tord sang in his native Norwegian.

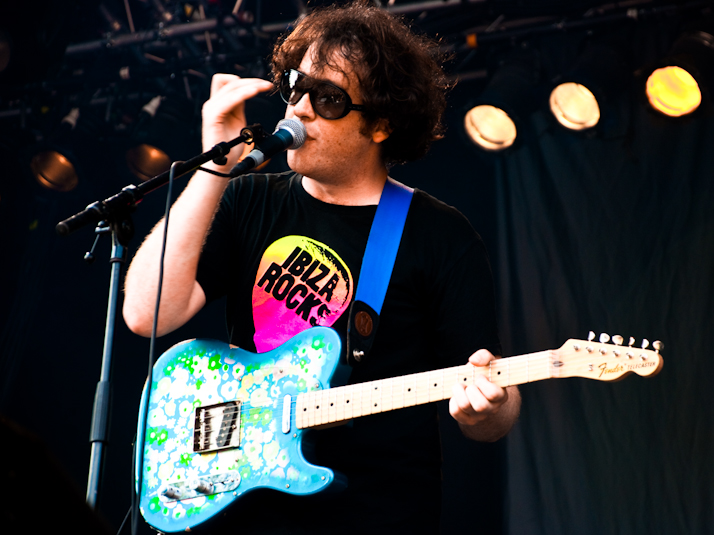
Lead vocalist Matthew Murphy performing with The Wombats in 2009

The summer of 2008 saw the band perform live at a number of major festivals including Glastonbury Festival in June and T in the Park in July, opening the BBC Radio 1 / NME Stage set on the Friday. They also played Reading and Leeds Festival on the Saturday and Friday respectively on the Radio 1/NME Stage supporting Babyshambles. In September 2008 the band were filmed for a cameo appearance on Australian soap Neighbours.

The band also announced via their MySpace blog that they would be releasing two singles, a seasonal 'Anti-Christmas' themed "Is This Christmas?" on 15 December 2008, followed by a track titled "My Circuitboard City" on 3 March 2009.

=== This Modern Glitch (2010–2013) ===
In September 2010, the band announced they were near to completing their second studio album, This Modern Glitch in the MRG Recording Studio in Los Angeles, California. The band worked with producers Eric Valentine and Jacknife Lee.

The Wombats performing in Portland in September 2012

The first single to be released from the album, "Tokyo (Vampires & Wolves)" was released in the UK on 27 September 2010 and debuted on the UK Singles Chart at number 23; marking the band's fifth Top 40 hit and third most successful single to date. The accompanying music video was shot in Los Angeles, CA during August 2010 and was directed by The General Assembly. Following the rumoured release of "Techno Fan" as the second single from the album, the track "Jump into the Fog" was confirmed for a release on 24 January 2011. "Anti-D" was the next single, with the album following two weeks later. The album, entitled This Modern Glitch, was released in April 2011 as a CD, digital download and also on 7" and 12" vinyl. The Wombats also played at the 2011 Southside and Hurricane music festivals in Germany.

The Wombats' song "Techno Fan" was previously used in European airline easyJet's television and Facebook campaigns.

=== Glitterbug (2013–2017) ===
On 11 September 2013, a mysterious hashtag message appeared on the band's Facebook page which read "#yourbodyisaweapon". A second message on 16 September stated: "Seismic activity is going on! Excited to announce that our new track 'Your Body Is a Weapon' will be out on October 2nd." The single premiered on BBC Radio 1 on 1 October as Zane Lowe's Hottest Record and was officially released the next day. Lead singer Murphy claimed that their next album would be released at some point in 2014, however this did not come to pass.

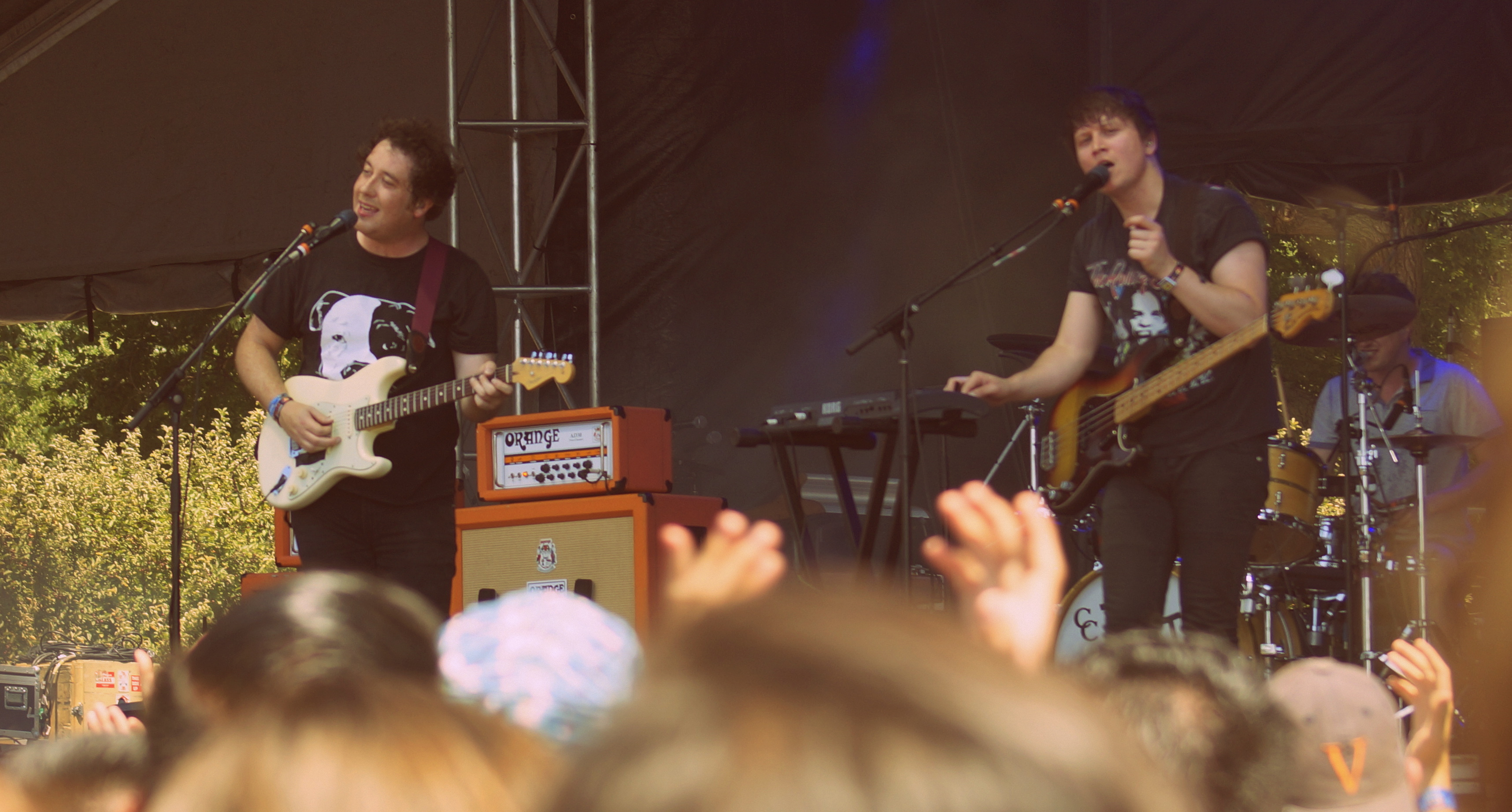
The Wombats at Lollapalooza 2015

On 17 December 2014, the Wombats announced that their new album, Glitterbug, would be released in April 2015 as well as revealing the official album cover. The album's second single titled 'Greek Tragedy' was premiered as Zane Lowe's Hottest Record on BBC Radio 1. A third track 'Emoticons' was published 16 February, with the third single from Glitterbug 'Give Me A Try' being released in March. To celebrate the album's release the Glitterbug B Sides EP was released on the same day. The album achieved similar chart success to its predecessor This Modern Glitch, charting at number 5 in the UK and 2 in Australia. Glitterbug also became The Wombats' first album to chart in the US, reaching 81 on the Billboard 200.

To support the album the band toured extensively across the world. They also performed "Greek Tragedy" on Late Night with Seth Meyers.

In January 2021 it was reported that a remix of Greek Tragedy had gone viral on the social media platform TikTok, where it had been used as the soundtrack for over 430,000 videos.

=== Beautiful People Will Ruin Your Life (2017–2021) ===
After being revealed as headliners of Australian festival Groovin' the Moo for 2017, Murphy announced that work was underway for a fourth Wombats album, with a release scheduled for the end of that Summer. However, the album was not released before this deadline. Instead, the band announced they would tour to celebrate the decade anniversary of their debut album.

On 4 September 2017, a teaser trailer was published on the band's Facebook, accompanied by an emoji of a knife and a lemon. On 30 October 2017, it was revealed via the group's Instagram that the fourth studio album would be titled Beautiful People Will Ruin Your Life. The first single off the album was "Lemon to a Knife Fight", released on 7 November 2017. The album was released on 9 February 2018.

=== Fix Yourself, Not the World (2021–2024) ===
Starting from 13 May 2021, the band posted a series of teasers on various social media, leading up to the announcement on 24 May 2021 of the single "Method to the Madness", which was eventually released on 26 May 2021. In the months following, the singles "If You Ever Leave, I'm Coming with You", "Ready for the High" and "Everything I Love Is Going to Die" were released as further teasers for their fifth studio album titled Fix Yourself, Not the World, which was published on 14 January 2022. The album enjoyed immediate success, reaching the top spot in the UK Albums Chart on the week of release and becoming the band's first UK No. 1 album.

The Wombats released the EP Is This What It Feels Like to Feel Like This? on 18 November 2022 via AWAL. The Wombats released their latest single on this EP on October 7, 2022, titled, "I Think My Mind Has Made Its Mind Up."

=== Oh! The Ocean (2024–present) ===
On September 27, 2024, The Wombats teased a new single, "Sorry I'm Late, I Didn't Want To Come," followed by further singles "Blood on the Hospital Floor," "My Head Is Not My Friend," and "Can't Say No," over the following months. These singles were released as a lead-in to their sixth studio album, Oh! The Ocean, which was released 14 February 2025.

== Band members ==
- Matthew Murphy – lead vocals, guitar, keyboards (2003–present)
- Tord Øverland Knudsen – bass guitar, guitar, keyboards, backing vocals (2003–present)
- Dan Haggis – drums, backing vocals, keyboards, guitar, percussion, mouth organ (2003–present)

== Discography ==
Studio albums

- A Guide to Love, Loss & Desperation (2007)
- This Modern Glitch (2011)
- Glitterbug (2015)
- Beautiful People Will Ruin Your Life (2018)
- Fix Yourself, Not the World (2022)
- Oh! The Ocean (2025)

== Awards and nominations ==
Awards and nominations for The Wombats
Year	Award	Category	Recipients and nominees	Result
2008	NME Awards	Best New Band	The Wombats	Nominated
2008	NME Awards	Best Dancefloor Filler	"Let's Dance to Joy Division"	Won
2008	NME Awards	Best Track	"Let's Dance to Joy Division"	Nominated
2008	XFM New Music Awards	Best Album	A Guide to Love, Loss and Desperation	Nominated
2008	2008 MTV Europe Music Awards	Best UK and Ireland New Act	The Wombats	Nominated
2022	APRA Music Awards of 2022	Most Performed Dance/Electronic Work	"Nothing to Love About Love" (with Peking Duk)	Nominated
