= Darian Cowgill =

- Born: November 7, 1972 (age 53); Pasadena, California, United States
- Genres: Rock, pop, reggae, acoustic, hip hop
- Occupations: Mix engineer, Record producer, musician
- Instruments: Vocals, guitar
- Years active: 1995–present
- Website: atriummusic.com

Darian Cowgill (born November 7, 1972, in Pasadena, California), is a local Southern California American audio engineer, mix engineer, record producer, College Level Professor, and Commercial Voice Over Artist.

== Career ==
Darian is an independent audio engineer and co-founder of The Den Recorders and Atrium Music, Atrium has been operational since 1998. Atrium Music, a music licensing and publishing firm, focuses not only on the individual artist, but their independent and continual growth.

The Atrium library consists of over 3000 composers and independent artists licensed from around the world for the purpose of placement in television, film, and all broadcast media opportunities.

Darian's musical career began with singing and touring with the Pasadena Boys Choir... followed by theater performances, solo performances, live sound, and in-studio production.

In 1998, he began an internship with Warped Tour creator, Kevin Lyman giving Darian a unique insight into the inner workings of the longest-running (Punk Rock Summer Camp) tour to date.

From his foundational experiences, he fell in love with exploring the other side of the studio glass as an audio engineer and later a producer and mixer.

He has since engineered and produced over 1000 unique local, independent, and major label bands and artists.

His work in national, international digital, and terrestrial radio began by working as a content producer and Production Director for Pyramid Radio from 2005 until 2009. This was under former Radio legend and then CBS president Steve Rivers, and former owner of Boston's Kiss 108 - Richie Balsbaugh.

Darian was Steve Rivers's last production director before his untimely passing. (Steve Rivers, former SVP/Programming for CBS Radio and the legendary programmer of such stations as WXKS/Boston, KIIS-FM/Los Angeles, and KMEL/San Francisco has died from cardiac arrest - 2012)

Darian has continued to work full time in Radio as a producer, audio, voice artist, and mix engineer for Los Angeles Burbank based independent radio syndication company Radio Express... where he produce multiple international top 20 count-down radio format, and mix format shows weekly including The World Chart Show with Lara Scott (current K-Earth 101 Los Angeles) and The World Chart Show with PJ Butta (current 93.5 KDAY Los Angeles) Other productions include but are not limited to the Airtel, Heineken, Coke, Sprite, Tom Tom, and Ford sponsored and syndicated shows in English, Spanish, and French for countries worldwide.

Meanwhile, Darian has continually worked as an independent record producer and engineer for many bands and artists. Including the American rock band, Oedipus. He has also worked with a number of other bands as a Producer, Editor, Mixer, and Mastering engineer.

These also include but are not limited Middle Class Rut, Beware of Darkness, Flagship, Zen Robbi, Katastro, The Graves, Kevin Sandbloom, Jonny Santos (Silent Civilian), Rafael Moreira, When in Rome, Jimmy Gnecco, Sleeping Giant, and many more.

In addition to mixing and producing individual single-release songs, complete albums, radio shows, television/film projects, and commercial broadcast content. Darian is also a voice artist for national and international brands and voices nationwide commercials for Benztown.

He was formerly a professor of Critical Listening for Engineers, and Digital Audio Technology II (advanced Pro-tools) in the Citrus College Recording Arts program in Glendora, California and continues to instruct at the high school, undergraduate, and graduate levels.

He is the founder of DAW - Darian's Audio Workshop focused on forensic audio and helping fight the good fight. Darian is continues in staying current as an AVID Certified ProTools Instructor.

== Education ==
Two-year AA/AS in Recording Arts from the Citrus College Recording Arts program.

Bachelor of Science degree in Business/Leadership from Azusa Pacific University.

Master's Degree in Communications from the University of Southern California.

== Awards and accolades ==
Darian was the Grand Prize winner of a Pensado's Place sponsored Indaba Music mix contest, for "Muffaletta" on Billy Martin's 2013, Heels Over Head album. Subsequently, Cowgill was interviewed by Dave Pensado on his weekly show, "Pensado's Place", regarding his victory.

Darian was a producer on the "Get Your Music in Film and TV" panel at the 32nd Westcoast Songwriter's Conference held in Los Altos, California. He was elected to the board of directors for Westcoastsongwriters.org in June 2014 and will continue to be a guest speaker and resource for the music production, mixing, and mastering seminars.

Darian is also an AVID certified Pro Tools instructor. He also endorses Slate Digital, THD Electronics, Dean Markley Strings and Mesa Boogie.

== Partial discography ==
=== Mix engineer (in short) ===
- Airtel World Chart Show
- Billy Martin – Wicked Knee
- Heineken World Chart Show
- Vicious Little Smile by Oedipus
- One California Day
- Rocket 21
- Sleeping Giant
- The Big Pill
- Wait
- Women in Film
- World Chart Show Urban

=== Mastering engineer (in short) ===
- Beware of Darkness
- Flagship
- Jelly of the Month Club
- Jimmy Gnecco
- Middle Class Rut
- Zen Robbi
- Cheerleader

=== Voice-over (in short) ===
- Advance Auto Parts
- Body Worlds Chicago
- Bed, Bath & Beyond
- CVS Pharmacy
- Disney Orlando
- Estée Lauder
- Finishline
- HomeGoods
- Knott's Berry Farm
- Logan International Airport
- Longs Drugs
- Marshalls
- Massachusetts State Lotto
- MTV
- Petro Express
- Rocket 21
- Sony Music
- Staples
- Telemundo 34
- T.J. Maxx
- Tulsa International Airport
- Unilever Sun Silk
- Val Surf
