= Girls, Boys and Marsupials =

Studio album by The Wombats
- Released: 20 September 2006
- Genre: Indie rock
- Length: 42:35

The Wombats chronology
Girls, Boys and Marsupials (2006)	A Guide to Love, Loss & Desperation (2007)

Girls, Boys and Marsupials is the first album by the Wombats, released in 2006 in Japan only. Many of these songs appear on their debut international album A Guide to Love, Loss & Desperation, released the following year. The tracks that did not feature on this album ("Metro Song", "Sunday TV", "Derail & Crash" and "Caravan in Wales") were featured as B-sides on single releases of "Kill the Director", "Let's Dance to Joy Division" and "Backfire at the Disco". "Derail & Crash" and "Metro Song" also featured on the iTunes bonus version of A Guide to Love, Loss & Desperation.

== Track listing ==
All lyrics are written by Matthew Murphy, except where noted; all music is composed by the Wombats.

No.	Title	Length
1.	"Moving to New York"	3:33
2.	"Lost in the Post"	3:11
3.	"Patricia the Stripper"	3:07
4.	"Party in a Forest (Where's Laura?)" (Matthew Murphy and the Wombats)	2:53
5.	"Backfire @ The Disco" (Matthew Murphy and the Wombats)	2:41
6.	"My First Wedding"	4:26
7.	"Metro Song"	5:18
8.	"Derail & Crash"	3:25
9.	"Little Miss Pipedream"	4:01
10.	"Caravan in Wales" (Matthew Murphy and the Wombats)	3:42
11.	"Sunday T.V." (Matthew Murphy and the Wombats)	5:41
12.	"Acapella" (The Wombats)	1:25
