= Techno Fan =

Single by The Wombats

from the album This Modern Glitch
- B-side: "Avalanche"; "Trampolining"; "Shock Goodbyes and P45's"
- Released: 6 June 2011
- Recorded: 2010
- Genre: Alternative rock, alternative dance, indie pop, electropop
- Length: 3:58
- Label: 14th Floor Records; Bright Antenna (US)
- Songwriter(s): Dan Haggis, Tord Øverland Knudsen, Matthew Murphy
- Producer(s): The Wombats

The Wombats singles chronology
| "Anti-D" (2011) | "Techno Fan" (2011) | "1996" (2011) |

"Techno Fan" is a single from the indie-rock band The Wombats. The single was released as an EP in the United Kingdom on 5 June 2011 as a digital download on iTunes including three B-sides: "Avalanche", "Trampolining" and "Shock Goodbyes and P45's". This is the 4th single from the album This Modern Glitch, following "Tokyo (Vampires & Wolves)", "Jump Into the Fog" and "Anti-D". The single peaked at number 60 on the UK Singles Chart. The song was featured in the online game Fifa 11 as part of its backing track. On the week of 22 October, it re-entered the charts at #84 following its use in airline easyJet's new television commercial.

== Music video ==
The music video for the song was uploaded to YouTube on 19 April 2011. The video was directed by Marc Klasfeld.

== Live performances ==
The Wombats performed the song on 15 May 2011 at BBC Radio 1's Big Weekend in Carlisle on the Main Stage.

== Track listing ==
Digital download
| No. | Title | Length |
|---|---|---|
| 1. | "Techno Fan" | 3:59 |
| 2. | "Avalanche" | 4:01 |
| 3. | "Trampolining" | 3:36 |
| 4. | "Shock Goodbyes and P45's" | 4:27 |

== Chart performance ==
| Chart (2011) | Peak position |
|---|---|
| UK Singles (The Official Charts Company) | 60 |
| Japan Hot 100 | 23 |

== Release history ==
| Region | Date | Label | Format |
|---|---|---|---|
| United Kingdom | 6 June 2011 | 14th Floor Records | Digital download |
