= Are You Real? =

Studio album by Beware of Darkness
- Released: September 16, 2016
- Recorded: 2015–2016
- Genre: Alternative rock; hard rock
- Length: 45:19
- Label: Bright Antenna

Beware of Darkness chronology
Sanctuary Season (2015)	Are You Real? (2016)

Singles from Are You Real?
- 1. "Muthafucka" Released: June 10, 2016; 2. "Dope" Released: July 14, 2016; 3. "Are You Real?" Released: September 1, 2016; 4. "Summer Daze" Released: March 29, 2017

Are You Real? is the second studio album by American rock band Beware of Darkness, released September 16, 2016 by Bright Antenna.

== Background and recording ==
According to Kyle Nicolaides, “After the first album, I didn’t think I was going to have a future in music at all, but ironically I realized the only power I really had to deal and cope with that was by writing more songs," he says. "This new record started from dealing with that uncertainty. Then it morphed into this idea that I wanted to make the best rock record of the past ten years, something original and fresh that has twelve songs all in one lane, with the feeling of overcoming something." Before recording this album Nicolaides had a goal of writing 100 songs. He was able to accomplish this goal. The revision process has changed between this album and their previous album Orthodox. The band started recording this album in fall of 2015.

== Track listing ==
No.	Title	Length
1.	"Muthafucka"	3:32
2.	"Blood, Sex, Violence & Murder"	4:03
3.	"Dope"	3:27
4.	"Summer Daze"	3:25
5.	"Tell Me This Isn't Fate"	4:25
6.	"Are You Real?"	3:23
7.	"Angel"	3:20
8.	"Surrender"	3:37
9.	"Hieroglyphics"	3:29
10.	"Sugar in the Raw"	4:09
11.	"Beware"	4:13
12.	"Delirium"	4:16

== Personnel ==
Beware of Darkness

- Kyle Nicolaides – lead vocals, lead guitar
- Daniel Curcio – bass
- Tony Cupito – drums, percussion
- Hayden Scott - drums on record
