= Aunt Betty =

Single by Middle Class Rut

from the album Pick Up Your Head
- Released: March 5, 2013
- Genre: Alternative rock
- Length: 4:23
- Label: Bright Antenna
- Songwriter(s): Zack Lopez and Sean Stockham
- Producer(s): Middle Class Rut

Middle Class Rut singles chronology
"Busy Bein' Born" (2010)	"Aunt Betty" (2013)

"Aunt Betty" is a single by American alt-rock band Middle Class Rut. It was released as the first single from their second album Pick Up Your Head. The song was an instant download with an iTunes pre-order of their second album Pick Up Your Head. The music video premiered April 26, 2013, on Loudwire.

== Charts ==
Chart (2013)	Peak position
US Alternative Airplay (Billboard)	38
US Mainstream Rock (Billboard)	31

== Personnel ==
- Zack Lopez – vocals, electric guitar, bass guitar
- Sean Stockham – vocals, drums
- Dave Sardy – mixing
