= Howl (song) =

Single by Beware of Darkness

from the album Howl EP and Orthodox
- Released: May 7, 2013
- Recorded: The Village Recorder, Los Angeles, California
- Genre: Alternative rock; blues rock; garage rock; hard rock
- Length: 4:03
- Label: Bright Antenna
- Songwriter(s): Kyle Nicolaides
- Producer(s): Kyle Nicolaides; Dave Sardy; Greg Gordon

Beware of Darkness singles chronology
"Howl" (2013)	"All Who Remain" (2013)

"Howl" is the debut single by American rock band Beware of Darkness. It was released on May 7, 2013. The song first appeared on the band's 2012 EP Howl and was featured on their debut studio Orthodox where it was an instant download with the pre-order of the album. The music video premiered on September 14, 2012 on Fuse.

Howl has been featured in the video game soundtracks of Saints Row IV, Need for Speed: Most Wanted, EA Sports UFC and Gran Turismo. The song has been featured in several television and movie projects including Stephen King's Under the Dome, Red 2, Monday Night Football and Nitro Circus 3D. On May 15, 2013 the band performed "Howl" live on Conan.

== Chart performance ==
Chart (2013)	Peak position
US Mainstream Rock Billboard	6

== Personnel (EP Version) ==
- Kyle Nicolaides – lead vocals, guitar
- Daniel Curcio – bass guitar
- Tony Cupito – drums
- Claudio Cueni – engineer

== Personnel (LP Version) ==
- Kyle Nicolaides – lead vocals, guitar
- Daniel Curcio – bass guitar
- Tony Cupito – drums
- Dave Sardy – executive producer
- Greg Gordon – producer
