= Blackbush =

blackbush

EP by Flagship
- Released: May 8, 2012
- Genre: Alternative rock
- Length: 22:01
- Language: English
- Label: Bright Antenna
- Producer: Flagship; Tate Huff

Flagship chronology
| blackbush (2012) | Flagship (2013) |

blackbush is the debut EP by American alt-rock band Flagship, released May 8, 2012, under exclusive license to Bright Antenna Records. The album was made available as a Digital Download, and CD available only at shows.

A preview of the album was released on Earmilk on May 8, 2012. In premiering the track "Still I Wait", Baeble Music said that the band "matches the emotional and nearly spiritual alternative rock of U2 circa Achtung Baby with the deep-throated baritone delivery of lead singer Drake Margolnick ala Ian Curtis from Joy Division and some of the seething anger and rawness of We Are Augustines."

== Track listing ==
1. Backseat - 4:16
2. Still I Wait - 4:19
3. The Knife - 4:02
4. The Fool - 4:35
5. Older - 4:49

== Personnel ==
- Produced by Flagship and Tate Huff
- Tracking and vocal coaching by Jeremy Current
- Engineered by Tate Huff
- Mixed by Will Brierre
- Mastered by Darian Cowgill
- A&R by Braden Merrick
