= The Capes (band) =

British indie rock band

- Origin: London, United Kingdom
- Genres: Indie rock
- Years active: 2002–2008
- Labels: Hard Soul Records (2005-2006); Fabtone Records (Japan)
- Members: Kris Barratt; Richard Gladman; Rupert Phelps; Rupert Cresswell; Nick Cresswell
- Website: Official site

The Capes was a five-piece indie rock band from South London. Their hook-laden music drew comparisons to britpop, in particular Blur.

== Biography ==
The band formed in 2002 when singer/guitarist Kris Barratt, keyboard player Richard Gladman, bass guitarist Rupert Cresswell and drummer Rupert Phelps began rehearsing together at South London's Goldsmiths College. Rupert Cresswell's brother Nick was soon brought in as an extra guitar and keyboard player, thus completing the current line-up of the band.

Hard Soul Records, an American label, released the band's debut EP Taste in 2005. This was followed in early 2006 by the Capes' first album, Hello. Despite two American tours, an appearance at SXSW, and favourable reviews by online publications such as Pitchfork Media and Cokemachineglow, by late 2006 the band had parted ways with Hard Soul. This was in part due to a general lack of support from the label, who, amongst other things, left the band stranded in Athens, Georgia at the end of the 2006 US tour. Hello, however, is still available both in the US and internationally via the iTunes Store.

In late 2006, the band signed to Fabtone records in Japan, who domestically released Hello, with a slightly different track list and some bonus tracks, on 10 January 2007.

The band has confirmed, via its Myspace page, that they are now defunct. Singer Kris Barratt is now focusing his attention on a new band, Spring Tigers, on the Bright Antenna label.

== Discography ==
=== Albums ===
- Hello (Hard Soul Records, 2006)

=== Singles and EPs ===
- Taste EP (Hard Soul Records, 2005)
- "Tightly Wound" Single (Outafocus Records, 2005)
