= Flagship (disambiguation) =

A flagship is a vessel used by the commanding officer of a group of naval ships.

Flagship may also refer to:

== Arts, entertainment, and media ==
- Flagship (band), an alt-rock band from Charlotte, NC, US
  - Flagship (album)
- Flagship (broadcasting), the originating broadcast for a broadcast network, radio show, or TV show
- Flagship (magazine), a former UK magazine specializing in postal and other games

== Brands and enterprises ==
- Flagship (company), a Japanese video game developer
- Endeavor Air (former callsign: Flagship)
- Flagship Airlines, a regional airline in Nashville, Tennessee, US
- Flagship Studios, an American video game developer

== Other uses ==
- Flagship product, also called a halo product or hero product, not always a core product or product representative of other products in that product line, a product that showcases the latest and/or best innovations, highest performance
- Flagship store
