= Patricia the Stripper =

"Patricia the Stripper" is the title to songs by:

- Chris de Burgh on his 1975 album, Spanish Train and Other Stories
- The Wombats on their 2007 album, The Wombats Proudly Present: A Guide to Love, Loss & Desperation
