= No Name No Color =

Studio album by Middle Class Rut
- Released: October 4th 2010
- Genres: Alternative rock; post-punk; blues rock; post-hardcore; post-grunge; garage rock
- Length: 53:32; 65:20 (Deluxe Edition)
- Language: English
- Label: Bright Antenna
- Producer: Self-Produced

Middle Class Rut chronology
25 Years (2009)	No Name No Color (2010)	Pick Up Your Head (2013)

No Name No Color is the debut LP by Middle Class Rut, released October 4, 2010 under exclusive Worldwide license to Bright Antenna. The album was made available as a Digital Download, CD and Limited Edition 12" Double Record.

== Reception ==
Professional ratings
Aggregate scores
Source	Rating
Metacritic	76/100
Review scores
Source	Rating
AllMusic	3.5/5 stars
Drowned in Sound	7/10
MusicOMH	2/5 stars
Premier Guitar	3.5/5 stars
Rock Sound	7/10
Classic Rock	7/10 stars

No Name No Color has received generally positive reviews. On the review aggregate site Metacritic, the album has a score of 76 out of 100, indicating "generally favorable reviews".

On March 5, 2011, No Name No Color reached #22 on Billboard's Heatseekers Chart.

== Track listing ==
1. Busy Bein' Born - 4:47
2. USA - 3:33
3. New Low - 4:16
4. Lifelong Dayshift - 4:27
5. One Debt Away - 3:22
6. Are You On Your Way - 6:22
7. Alive or Dead - 4:48
8. I Guess You Could Say - 4:19
9. Sad to Know - 4:08
10. Dead End - 4:29
11. Thought I Was - 4:38
12. Cornbred - 4:24

Deluxe Edition Bonus Tracks

1. Critical Emotional - 3:46
2. Free Lot - 4:24
3. New Low (Music Video) - 4:38

== Singles ==
Year	Song	Peak chart positions			Album
Year	Song	US Alt.	US Main.	US Rock	Album
2010	"New Low"	6	38	12	No Name No Color
2011	"Busy Bein' Born"	26	—	47	No Name No Color
2012	"Are You on Your Way"	38	—	—	No Name No Color
