= Oedipus (disambiguation) =

Oedipus was the mythical king of Thebes.

Oedipus may also refer to:

- Oedipus (horse), an American Thoroughbred racehorse

== Plays ==
- Oedipus Rex, an Athenian tragedy by Sophocles
- Oedipus at Colonus, an Athenian tragedy by Sophocles
- Oedipus (Euripides), a mostly lost play
- Oedipus (Seneca), a Latin-language tragedy by Seneca the Younger
- Oedipus (Dryden), an English-language tragedy by John Dryden
- Oedipus (Voltaire), a French-language tragedy by Voltaire
- Oedipus (Icke play), a 2018 reimagining of Oedipus Rex by Robert Icke

== Operas ==
- Œdipe, by George Enescu
- Oedipus rex (opera), by Igor Stravinsky
- Oedipus (opera), by Wolfgang Rihm
- Greek (opera), by Mark-Anthony Turnage

== Modern music ==
- Oedipus (band), an American rock band
- "Oedipus", a song by Regina Spektor on the album Songs
- Oedipus (DJ), the long-time program director of WBCN in Boston

== Films ==
- Oedipus Rex (film), a 1967 Italian film directed by Pier Paolo Pasolini

== Oedipus complex ==
- Oedipus complex, a psychological theory
- Oedipina complex, the Gamboa worm salamander, formerly known as Oedipus complex

== Zoology ==
- Oedipus Berthold, 1827, a junior synonym of the insect genus Locusta (migratory locust)
- Oedipus Tschudi, 1838, an invalid name for the amphibian genus Bolitoglossa
- Oedipus Lesson, 1840, an invalid name for the primate genus Saguinus (tamarins)
- Oedipus Dana, 1852, an invalid name for the crustacean genus Coralliocaris
- Oedipus Menge, 1876, an invalid name for some spiders in the family Salticidae (jumping spiders)

== Characters ==
- Stinkor, original name Oedipus (He-man and the masters of the universe) anime
