= Anti-D (song) =

Single by The Wombats

from the album This Modern Glitch
- Released: 11 April 2011
- Recorded: 2010
- Genre: Indie pop, post-Britpop
- Length: 4:39
- Label: 14th Floor Records; Bright Antenna (US)
- Songwriters: Matthew Murphy; Dan Haggis; Tord Øverland-Knudsen
- Producer: Jacknife Lee

The Wombats singles chronology
"Jump into the Fog" (2011)	"Anti-D" (2011)	"Techno Fan" (2011)

"Anti-D" is a single by English rock band The Wombats. The single was released in the UK on 11 April 2011 as a digital download on their official site and 10 April on iTunes, including three B-sides: "I'm a Robot Like You", "Dear Hamburg", and "Wonderful Distraction". It is the third single from the album This Modern Glitch, following "Tokyo (Vampires & Wolves)" and "Jump Into the Fog".

BBC Radio 1 DJ Zane Lowe made "Anti-D" his "Hottest Record in the World" on 21 February 2011. To celebrate Record Store Day, an exclusive "Anti-D" single, with different album art, was released.

== Conception ==
The song, written by frontman Matthew Murphy, tells the story of his addiction to anti-depressants, which he had been taking to combat his anxiety and which he said made him "a mess". He claims that the main reason he felt he had to come off the pills was that he was gaining weight, which inspires the line, "Then there's the extra two stone that's our only guarantee."

== Critical reception ==
John Fernandez of music blog There Goes the Fear gave the song a positive review, saying, "It's by far their most grown-up single so far; the lyrics are hard hitting, and while I myself may not be able to relate to it easily, I can imagine that it strikes a chord with the audience they are looking for."

== Track listing ==
Digital download
No.	Title	Length
1.	"Anti-D"	4:41
2.	"I'm a Robot Like You"	3:51
3.	"Dear Hamburg"	3:57
4.	"Wonderful Distraction"	4:19

== Chart performance ==
Chart (2011)	Peak position
UK Singles (The Official Charts Company)	42
