= Sister Marie Says =

Single by Orchestral Manoeuvres in the Dark

from the album History of Modern
- B-side: "History of Modern (Part III & IV)"; "The Grand Deception"
- Released: 15 November 2010
- Recorded: 2007–2010; The Motor Museum, Liverpool
- Genre: Synth-pop
- Length: 4:00 (album version); 3:32 (radio edit)
- Label: 100% Bright Antenna
- Songwriter: McCluskey
- Producers: OMD, Guy Katsav

Orchestral Manoeuvres in the Dark singles chronology
"If You Want It" (2010)	"Sister Marie Says" (2010)	"History of Modern (Part I)" (2011)

Audio video
- "Sister Marie Says" on YouTube

"Sister Marie Says" is the 32nd UK single by the English electronic band Orchestral Manoeuvres in the Dark (OMD), released on 15 November 2010. Remixes by Monarchy, Stopmakingme, Kinky Roland and Mirrors were commissioned.

== Background ==
"Sister Marie Says" was originally written in 1981. Elements of it were also commissioned. In 1996, the song was due to feature on the group's tenth album Universal, but was scrapped due to the song being out-of-character with the album's reflective tone.

The subject of the song is self-styled nun, prophet and astronomer 'Sister Marie Gabriel' (a.k.a. Sofia Richmond, Sofia Paprocski, Zofia Sagatis, Sofia Marie Angel, etc.; b. Poland, 1941) who became notorious for producing apocalyptic warnings of imminent world doom. This later culminated in 1994 with her publishing (from her London flat) alarming full-page advertisements in several British national daily newspapers, incorrectly predicting "God's final warning", a supposed massive fireball directed across space at planet Earth from Jupiter, resulting from the (already predicted) impact of comet Shoemaker-Levy 9.

After the band's reunion, the song was demoed in 2007 and released as a free download. The final version was produced and mixed by Guy Katsav at his London studio and was featured on their eleventh studio album History of Modern.

== Release ==
The duo announced the single on 18 October 2010. The artwork was also revealed, as well as the candidates for remixes which also include Switchblade, The Str8jackets & Zoned Out. On 26 October 2010, the limited edition 7" vinyl single was released for pre-order on the band's website.

== Music video ==
The music video for "Sister Marie Says" was released on 25 October 2010.

== Track listings ==
=== Limited edition 7 in vinyl ===
Side one
No.	Title	Writer(s)	Length
1.	"Sister Marie Says" (Radio edit)	OMD	3:32

Side two
No.	Title	Length
2.	"History of Modern (Part III & IV)"	3:00

The B-side track History of Modern (Part III & IV) on this Limited edition single is a longer version than the one on the EP History of Modern (Part I), where the track with the same name is only 2:03

=== CD single, Germany ===
1. "Sister Marie Says"
2. "The Grand Deception"

=== CD The Remixes, UK ===
1. "Sister Marie Says" (Monarchy's Twin Galaxies Remix) - 6:48
2. "Sister Marie Says" (Stopmakingme Remix) - 7:09
3. "Sister Marie Says" (Soil In The Synth Remix) - 4:28
4. "Sister Marie Says" (Mirros - Un Autre Monde Remix) - 6:30
5. "Sister Marie Says" (Str8jackets Deluded Rub) - 7:14
6. "Sister Marie Says" (Zoned Out's Extended Mix) - 5:32
7. "Sister Marie Says" (Kinky Roland's Dance Mix) - 7:29
8. "Sister Marie Says" (Switchblade's North Of Detroit Remix) - 6:24

== Chart performance ==
Chart (2010)	Peak position
UK Singles (OCC)	169
