= Sweet Girl =

Sweet Girl may refer to:

== Film ==
- The Sweet Girl, a 1926 German silent film directed by Manfred Noa
- Sweet Girl, a 1953 Cantonese music film starring Yam Kim-fai
- Sweet Girl (film), an American action thriller film directed by Brian Andrew Mendoza

== Music ==
- "Sweet Girl", song by Stevie Nicks and Fleetwood Mac from The Dance, 1997
- Sweet Girl (EP), by Korean boy group B1A4, 2015
  - "Sweet Girl", the Korean-language title track from the EP, 2015
- "Sweet Girl", song by Beware of Darkness from Orthodox, 2013

== Other ==
- Sweet Girl, horse ridden by Roger Moeremans d'Emaüs 1920
- Sweet Girl, horse, winner of the Prix Thomas Bryon 1960
