= The Heart (album) =

Studio album by Jimmy Gnecco
- Released: July 20, 2010
- Genre: Alternative
- Length: 57:50; 64:00 (Deluxe Edition)
- Label: Bright Antenna
- Producer: Self-Produced

The Heart is the debut solo album of Ours lead singer Jimmy Gnecco. The album was released via Bright Antenna on July 20, 2010. It was self-produced by Gnecco, who also played every instrument on the album. "Bring You Home" has been announced as the album's first single. On November 7, 2011, a version of the album with new mixes and a full band was released entitled The Heart X Edition.

== Track listing ==
All songs written by Jimmy Gnecco.

1. Rest Your Soul - 4:49
2. Light on the Grave - 4:02
3. Mystery - 4:40
4. The Heart - 6:13
5. Bring You Home - 3:01
6. These Are My Hands - 3:21
7. Days - 3:39
8. Gravity - 3:50
9. I Heard You Singing - 4:34
10. Take a Chance - 3:39
11. Darling - 5:03
12. Light on the Grave (Reprise) - 0:51
13. Patiently Waiting - 3:04
14. It's Only Love - 3:24
15. Talk to Me - 5:43
16. Hello (on Deluxe Edition) - 3:56
17. A Place In the Sun (on Deluxe Edition) - 3:14
