= Monarchy (band) =

British-based Australian music duo

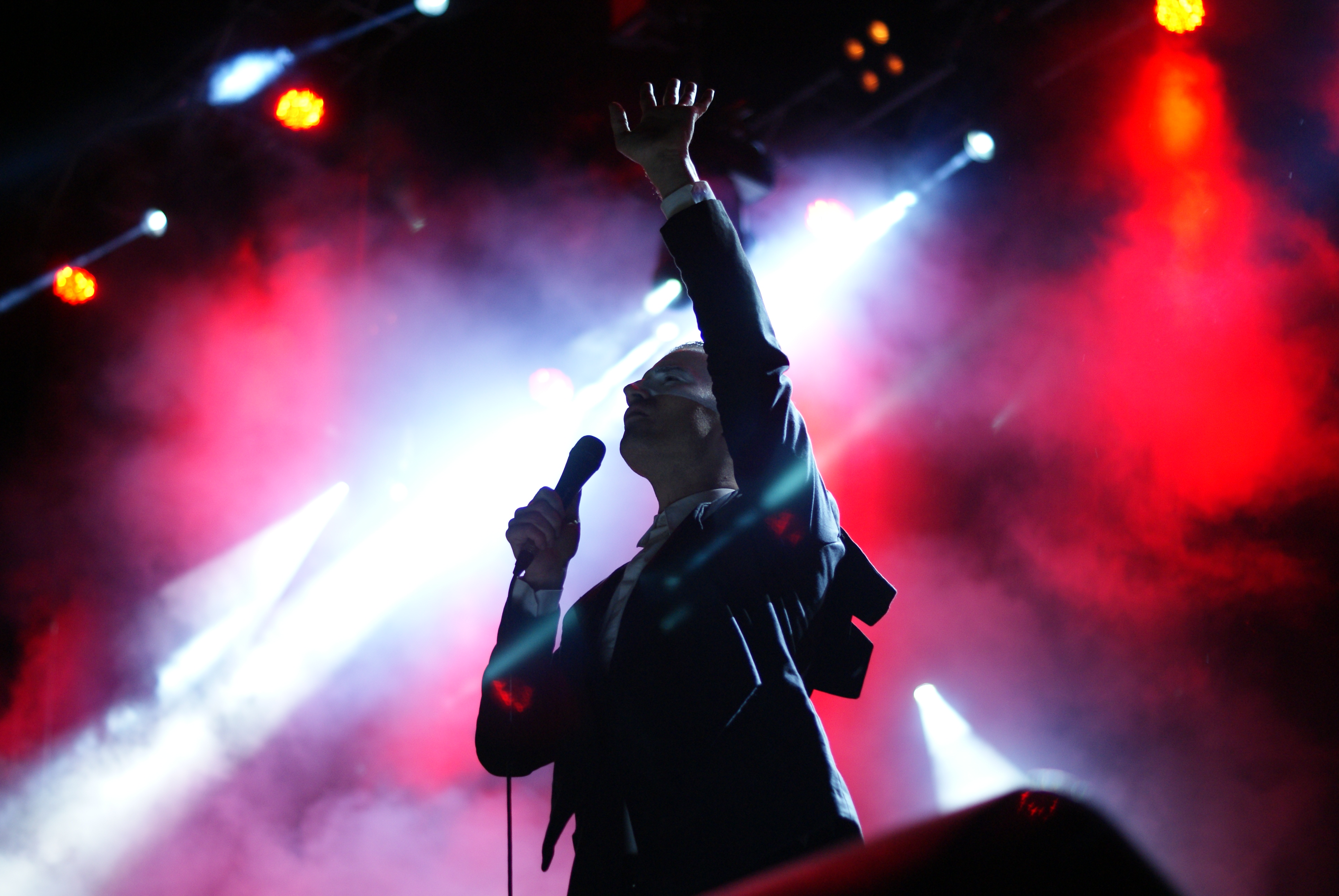
- Monarchy performing at the Palencia Sonora festival in Palencia, Spain, June 2016

Background information
- Also known as: Milke
- Origin: London, England
- Genres: Synth-pop
- Years active: 2009–2021
- Labels: Neon Gold; This Is Music; Mercury; Moda; 100%; Monstercat
- Members: Andrew Armstrong; Ra Black
- Website: www.monarchysound.com

Monarchy were a British-based Australian electronic music duo consisting of Andrew Armstrong (also known as Andrew "Friendly" Kornweibel; producer, DJ) and Ra Black (also known as Ra Khahn; vocals, lyrics). Based in London, the duo was previously known as Milke. They have released four studio albums and two extended plays.

== History ==
In November 2009, Monarchy was featured as "Band of the Day" on The Guardian website. Monarchy's debut single "Gold in the Fire" was released on 1 February 2010 on Neon Gold Records, containing the B-side "Black, the Colour of My Heart". They have created remixes for Ellie Goulding, Kelis, Lady Gaga, Marina and the Diamonds, Jamiroquai, Kylie Minogue, Orchestral Manoeuvres in the Dark and Fyfe Dangerfield.

Their first live show was broadcast into space from Cape Canaveral, Florida, in June 2010, making them the first band ever to perform live into space. They have since performed at various London and UK venues including XOYO and HMV Forum, and festivals including The Big Chill, Popaganda in Sweden, Bestival, Eurosonic Festival in the Netherlands, Midem in Cannes, as well as Paris, Dijon, Rouen, Amsterdam, and across Europe. In 2011 they performed at Coachella Valley Music and Arts Festival, Hay Festival and Melt! festival, amongst others. Monarchy played the Together Winter Music Festival in London at the Alexandra Palace on 26 November 2011.

After signing to Mercury Records in February 2010, Monarchy was set to release their self-titled debut album that August. However, the duo were dropped by Mercury a few months later, and the album's release was cancelled. Their debut album was ultimately released on 11 July 2011 by independent label 100% Records under a new title, Around the Sun, with a slightly different track listing. The Guardian gave the album three out of five stars and stated that "[t]he lyrics are often arrant nonsense [...] but there are many pleasures here." NME rated the album five out of 10, comparing Monarchy to Hurts, The Sound of Arrows and Steps. Popjustice placed Around the Sun at number fourteen on its list of the best albums of 2011. Their song "The Phoenix Alive" was featured in EA Sports game, FIFA 12 with remix of Kris Menace.

Monarchy's single "Disintegration" was released digitally on 14 January 2013 and features Neo-Burlesque performer Dita Von Teese, who also appears on the track's accompanying music video. The duo released the single "Living Without You" on 28 April 2014. Their extended play Almost Human, was officially released on 8 September 2014, after premiering exclusively on Vibe's website on 15 August. Monarchy's second studio album, Abnocto, was released on 6 March 2015 by Hacan Sounds. It was preceded by the single "Dancing in the Corner" on 19 January 2015.

On 27 April 2015, Armstrong announced the split of Monarchy. On 1 June, he announced that the duo had reconciled and would continue touring and creating new music.

Monarchy collaborated with electronic artist Karma Fields on the track "Faint Echoes", taken from the album New Age | Dark Age, released on 2 March 2016.

On 6 August 2021 the band announced they would be splitting once again. This was accompanied by the release of the bands latest album SYZYGY.

== Discography ==
=== Studio albums ===
Title	Details
Around the Sun	Released: 11 July 2011; Label: 100%; Formats: CD, digital download
Abnocto	Released: 6 March 2015; Label: Hacan Sounds; Formats: CD, LP, digital download
Mid:Night	Released: 18 January 2019; Label: Warner Music Spain; Formats: CD, LP, digital download

=== Extended plays ===
Title	Details
Almost Human	Released: 8 September 2014; Label: Hacan Sound; Format: Digital download
Re|Vision	Released: 15 June 2015; Label: Hacan Sound; Format: Digital download

=== Singles ===
Title	Year	Album
"Gold in the Fire"	2010	Around the Sun
"The Phoenix Alive"	2010	Around the Sun
"Love Get Out of My Way"	2010	Around the Sun
"I Won't Let Go"	2011	Around the Sun
"Maybe I'm Crazy"	2011	Around the Sun
"You Don't Want to Dance with Me" (featuring Britt Love)	2011	Around the Sun
"Disintegration" (featuring Dita Von Teese)	2013	Abnocto
"Living Without You"	2014	Abnocto
"Dancing in the Corner"	2015	Abnocto
"Hula Hoop 8000"	2016	Mid:Night
"MidNight"	2016	Mid:Night
"Dance Like Hell"	2016	Non-album single
"Deep Cut"	2018	Mid:Night
"Back to the Start"	2019	Mid:Night
"Glow Vision"	2019	Non-album singles
"Just Give Me Your Love"	2020	Non-album singles

=== Music videos ===
Title	Year	Director(s)
"The Phoenix Alive"	2010	Nils Porrmann
"Love Get Out of My Way"	2010	Price James
"I Won't Let Go"	2011	Roy Raz
"You Don't Want to Dance with Me" (featuring Britt Love)	2011	Ramy Dance
"Disintegration" (featuring Dita Von Teese)	2013	Roy Raz
"Living Without You"	2014	Jimmy Ahlander and Robin Antiga
"Almost Human"	2014	Matthew Daily Young
"The Beautiful Ones"	2014	Maud Regnault and Thomas Blanchard
"Dancing in the Corner"	2015	Ch. Martínez
"Black Widow"	2015	Ross McElwain and Manos Ioannou
"Fractured World"	2015	Rosie Roche
"Girls & Boys" (featuring Dita Von Teese)	2015	Andrew Armstrong
"Hula Hoop 8000"	2017	Virgili Jubero
"MidNight"	2018	Alberto Van Stokkum
"Back to the Start"	2019	Mar del Corral

=== Remixes ===
Title	Year	Artist
"She Needs Me" (Monarchy Black Galaxy Remix)	2010	Fyfe Dangerfield
"Hollywood" (Monarchy 'Gliese Remix')	2010	Marina and the Diamonds
"Acapella" (Monarchy Urania Club Mix)	2010	Kelis
"Starry Eyed" (Monarchy 'The Horse Head Nebular' Remix)	2010	Ellie Goulding
"Dance in the Dark" (Monarchy 'Stylites' Remix)	2010	Lady Gaga
"White Knuckle Ride" (Monarchy Remix)	2010	Jamiroquai
"Sister Marie Says" (Monarchy Twin Galaxies Remix)	2010	Orchestral Manoeuvres in the Dark
"Better than Today" (Monarchy 'Kylie Through the Wormhole' Remix)	2010	Kylie Minogue
"Mantra Mania" (Monarchy Remix)	2016	S'Express
