= Spring Tigers =

American pop band from Athens, Georgia

- Origin: Athens, Georgia, United States
- Genres: Indie Rock; pop
- Years active: 2008–present
- Labels: Bright Antenna
- Members: Kris Barratt; Stephen James; Shane Davis; Eli Barnard; Brad Elliott
- Past members: Chase Prince

Spring Tigers are an American pop band from Athens, Georgia. The band was formed in March 2008.

== History ==
The band was formed when Kris Barratt, as frontman of the since disbanded group, the Capes, found himself stranded in Athens mid-tour when his record label was unable to fly him back to England. According to Barratt, the new band was formed to open for the band, the Lodger, only five days before the showtime, "One night when I was at GO Bar, I talked to a guy I knew that worked there about playing the show with me, and between the two of us we were able to find more people and form a band to play the show." The band's name is derived from a song by Guided By Voices.

Spring Tigers signed in 2009 to indie label Bright Antenna. They released their eponymous mini-LP Spring Tigers in 2009. Carl Gauze of Ink19, in his review, noted the band's "energetic pop", and wrote, "this band has some real potential and with a few more years touring and recording, they just might be the next overnight sensation".

The band finished an LP which Barratt described as, "more rock and less glossy than the mini album ... loud and angry but still catchy basically. We've switched from Fenders and AC30's to Gibson's and Marshalls." however they were mired in legal issues and decided to pull the album from release. The band officially split but the majority of members reformed as "Haints".

== Band members ==
Current members

- Kris Barratt (guitar/vocals)
- Stephen James (keys/drums/guitar)
- Shane Davis (guitar)
- Eli Barnard (bass)
- Brad Elliott (drums)

Former members

- Chase Prince (drums)

== Discography ==
- Spring Tigers (2009)
