= 1996 (song) =

Single by The Wombats

from the album This Modern Glitch
- Released: 2011
- Length: 4:20
- Label: 14th Floor Records; Bright Antenna
- Songwriters: Matthew Murphy; Tord Øverland-Knudsen; Dan Haggis

The Wombats singles chronology
"Techno Fan" (2011)	"1996" (2011)	"Your Body Is a Weapon" (2013)

"1996" is a song by Liverpudlian indie band, The Wombats. It was the sixth and final single released from their second album This Modern Glitch. The title of this album is also taken from a line in '1996'.

== Track listings ==
1996 - Single
No.	Title	Length
1.	"1996"	4:20

1996 (Remixes) - EP
No.	Title	Length
1.	"1996"	4:20
2.	"1996" (James Njie Remix)	5:23
3.	"1996" (Discopolis Remix)	4:08
4.	"1996" (Lenno Remix)	4:53
5.	"1996" (Echoes Remix)	3:05
