= This Modern Glitch =

2011 studio album by The Wombats

Studio album by the Wombats
- Released: 22 April 2011
- Recorded: 2010
- Studios: Various: Eldorado Recording Studios (Burbank); Barefoot Studios (Los Angeles); Whitewood Studios (Liverpool); NRG Recording Studios (North Hollywood); University of Las Vegas Studios (Las Vegas); Pomwell Studios; Ruby Red Productions (Atlanta)
- Genres: Indie pop; alternative dance; new wave music; post-punk
- Length: 40:31
- Labels: 14th Floor, Bright Antenna (US)
- Producers: Rich Costey, Eric Valentine, Butch Walker, Jacknife Lee, The Wombats

The Wombats chronology
A Guide to Love, Loss & Desperation (2007)	This Modern Glitch (2011)	Glitterbug (2015)

Singles from This Modern Glitch
- 1. "Tokyo (Vampires & Wolves)" Released: 24 September 2010; 2. "Jump into the Fog" Released: 24 January 2011; 3. "Anti-D" Released: 11 April 2011; 4. "Techno Fan" Released: 5 June 2011; 5. "Our Perfect Disease" Released: 14 August 2011; 6. "1996" Released: 7 November 2011

The Wombats Proudly Present This Modern Glitch, usually shortened to This Modern Glitch, is the second major studio album by English rock band the Wombats. Released in the UK on 25 April 2011, the album was supported by three singles prior to its release: "Tokyo (Vampires & Wolves)", "Jump into the Fog", "Anti-D". A further three singles were released following release: "Techno Fan", "Our Perfect Disease", and "1996". The Wombats produced the album alongside Rich Costey, Eric Valentine, Butch Walker, and Jacknife Lee. Upon its release, the album received favourable reviews by critics. It has sold 126,772 copies in the UK as of April 2015. For its 10th anniversary, the album was re-released as a "10th anniversary edition" on vinyl and digitally containing B-sides, remixes and acoustic versions.

== Singles ==
- "Tokyo (Vampires & Wolves)" is the first single released from the album, it was released on 24 September 2010. It peaked at number 23 on the UK Singles Chart, and also charted at number 33 in Australia as well as number 66 in the Netherlands. It came in at number 8 on Australia's 'Hottest 100' countdown of 2010.
- "Jump into the Fog" is the second single released from the album, it was released on 24 January 2011. It peaked at number 35 on the UK Singles Chart and at number 16 on the US Billboard Alternative Songs chart.
- "Anti-D" is the third single released from the album, it was released on 11 April 2011. It peaked at number 42 on the UK Singles Chart.
- "Techno Fan" is the fourth single released from the album, it was released on 5 June 2011. It peaked at number 60 on the UK Singles Chart.
- "Our Perfect Disease" is the fifth single released from the album, it was released on 14 August 2011.
- "1996" was the sixth single released from the album on 7 November 2011.

== Reception ==
Professional ratings
Aggregate scores
Source	Rating
Metacritic	59/100
Review scores
Source	Rating
AllMusic	4/5 stars
American Music Channel	3.5/5 stars
BBC Music	(very favourable)
Consequence of Sound	3.5/5 stars
Daily Mirror	4/5 stars
The Guardian	3/5 stars
NME	4/10 stars
Paste	(7.1/10)
The Sunday Times	3/5 stars
thinkofmusic	6/10 stars
The Tune	(2.4/5)

The album received mixed to favourable reviews, with an aggregated score of 59 from Metacritic. Mark Beaumont of the BBC described the album as 'a flawless modern classic', as well as calling it 'pop album of the year, by at least a dozen choruses'. Matt Collar of AllMusic gave a similarly positive review, saying ' This Modern Glitch finds the gleefully cynical Brit trio delivering a batch of catchy, immediately memorable dance-rock tracks the likes of which haven't been heard since the glory days of Blur'. The Daily Mirror called the album 'triumphant', singling out Anti-D as 'epic'.

== Track listing ==
The official track listing:

No.	Title	Length
1.	"Our Perfect Disease"	3:46
2.	"Tokyo (Vampires & Wolves)"	3:45
3.	"Jump into the Fog"	3:51
4.	"Anti-D"	4:39
5.	"Last Night I Dreamt..."	3:32
6.	"Techno Fan"	3:58
7.	"1996"	4:19
8.	"Walking Disasters"	4:16
9.	"Girls/Fast Cars"	3:35
10.	"Schumacher the Champagne"	4:50

iTunes bonus tracks
No.	Title	Length
11.	"Valentine"	3:58
12.	"Track by Track" (Video)	--:--

iTunes Deluxe Edition bonus tracks
No.	Title	Length
11.	"Valentine"	3:58
12.	"Track by Track" (video)
13.	"Tokyo (Vampires & Wolves)" (music video)
14.	"Jump Into the Fog" (music video)
15.	"Anti-D" (music video)
16.	"Techno Fan (This Acoustic Glitch)" (video)
17.	"Anti-D (This Acoustic Glitch)" (video)

HMV bonus tracks
No.	Title	Length
11.	"Tokyo (Vampires & Wolves)" (acoustic version)
12.	"Jump Into the Fog" (acoustic version)

Australian bonus content
No.	Title	Length
11.	"Anti-D" (acoustic version)	4:44
12.	"Techno Fan" (acoustic version)	3:55
13.	"Tokyo (Vampires & Wolves)" (autoKratz Koenji Remix)	4:53
14.	"Tokyo (Vampires & Wolves)" (Grum Remix)
15.	"Tokyo (Vampires & Wolves)" (SiN Remix)

10th Anniversary Edition
No.	Title	Length
11.	"Addicted to the Cure"	3:41
12.	"Valentine"	3:57
13.	"How I Miss Sally Bray"	3:24
14.	"I'm a Robot Like You"	3:51
15.	"Wonderful Distraction"	4:18
16.	"Dear Hamburg"	3:56
17.	"Shock Goodbyes and P45's"	4:27
18.	"Avalanche"	4:01
19.	"Trampolining"	3:36
20.	"IOU's"	4:04
21.	"Guillotine"	4:06
22.	"Reynold's Park"	3:40
23.	"Tokyo (Vampires & Wolves) (This Acoustic Glitch)"	3:54
24.	"Anti-D (This Acoustic Glitch)"	4:43
25.	"Jump into the Fog (This Acoustic Glitch)"	3:41
26.	"Techno Fan (This Acoustic Glitch)"	3:55
27.	"Tokyo (Vampires & Wolves)" (Grum Remix)	5:23
28.	"Tokyo (Vampires & Wolves)" (SiN Remix)	4:08
29.	"Tokyo (Vampires & Wolves)" (autoKratz Koenji Remix)	4:53
30.	"Tokyo (Vampires & Wolves)" (Superhumanoids Remix)	3:05
31.	"Jump into the Fog" (Crystal Fighters Remix)	4:52
32.	"Techno Fan" (Afrojack Extended Club Remix)	7:43
33.	"Techno Fan" (Diplo Remix)	4:24
34.	"Our Perfect Disease" (Plastic Plates Remix)	5:50
35.	"1996" (Discopolis Remix)	4:53
36.	"1996" (Echoes Remix)	5:28
37.	"1996" (James Njie Remix)	6:07
38.	"1996" (Lenno Remix)	5:49

== Personnel ==
- Matthew Murphy – lead vocals, guitars, keyboards, synthesizers, electric piano (10), electric lute (10), omnichord (10), programming, percussion
- Tord Øverland Knudsen – bass guitar, synthesizers, keyboards, piano (2), baritone guitar (4, 6), glockenspiel (4), omnichord (5), programming, percussion, backing vocals
- Dan Haggis – drums, synthesizers, keyboards, piano (2, 4), organ (4), electric piano (5), banjo (10), dulcimer (4), programming, percussion, backing vocals
- Rich Costey – programming, percussion
- John Hill – programming
- Dave Navarro – additional guitar (9)
- Graeme Revell – string arrangements and conducting (4, 10)

personnel per album liner notes and Discogs

== Charts and certifications ==
=== Weekly charts ===
Chart (2011)	Peak position
Australian Albums Chart	2
Austrian Albums Chart	38
Belgium (Flanders) Albums Chart	93
Dutch Albums Chart	31
German Albums (Offizielle Top 100)	24
Norwegian Albums Chart	14
Scottish Albums Chart	5
Swiss Albums Chart	33
UK Albums Chart	3

=== Year-end charts ===
Chart (2011)	Position
Australian Albums Chart	36

=== Certifications ===
Region	Certification	Certified units/sales
Australia (ARIA)	Gold	35,000^{^}
United Kingdom (BPI)	Gold	100,000^{^}
^{^} Shipments figures based on certification alone.
