= Tokyo (Vampires & Wolves) =

2010 single by the Wombats

Single by the Wombats

from the album This Modern Glitch
- Released: 24 September 2010
- Recorded: 2010
- Genre: Alternative dance, synthpop
- Length: 3:51
- Label: 14th Floor, Bright Antenna
- Songwriters: Matthew Murphy, Dan Haggis, Tord Øverland-Knudsen
- Producer: Eric Valentine

The Wombats singles chronology
"My Circuitboard City" (2009)	"Tokyo (Vampires & Wolves)" (2010)	"Jump into the Fog" (2011)

"Tokyo (Vampires & Wolves)" is a song by Liverpudlian indie band the Wombats. It was the first single to be released from their second album This Modern Glitch. The song was added to the A-list on BBC Radio 1.

== Background ==
In an interview with Digital Spy, drummer Dan Haggis said:

"We've approached this album slightly differently from the last. "Whereas the first album was practically recorded live with a few overdubs, this time round we've had the time to really play with the sonics. Now we just can't wait to get out there and get sweaty."

Singer Matthew Murphy told XFM about the sound of the new single: "I don't think we consciously thought we'd make a synth-pop-whatever record. It just happened. There are a lot more keyboards and I didn't play as much guitar. It's quite an angsty, anxious song, wanting to run away from everything. A lot of our songs are escapist, I think."

The cover also resembles a map of Tokyo.

== Critical reception ==
Fraser McAlpine of BBC Chart Blog gave the song a positive review stating:

There are times when taking the things that clever people say on face value is a dangerous game.

Take this song. We all know that Matt Murphy is a smart man, with a keen eye for the wry, so it's a toss-up as to whether this is supposed to be a parody of all the songs bands write about the existential horrors of life on the road, or actually one of those songs bands write about the existential horrors of life on the road, only one with a keener-than-usual sense of self-awareness, written by a man with a knack for jamming up happy pop tunes with sad lyrics.

Or it could just be a genuine song about feeling dehumanised by the rigours of life in a touring pop band, and wanting to return to the one great night out that made it all seem worthwhile.

Or all of these things. Or none of these things..

The song also came eighth in the largest music poll in the world, Australian radio station's Triple J's Hottest 100 of 2010.

== Chart performance ==
"Tokyo (Vampires & Wolves)" debuted on the UK Singles Chart on 3 October 2010, where it debuted at number 23; marking the band's fifth top 40 hit and the third most successful of these behind "Moving to New York" and "Let's Dance to Joy Division", which reached numbers 13 and 15 respectively. The single spent only two weeks within the top 40, falling to number 32 in its second week and number 43 the week after. On 14 November, the single made its last appearance within the UK top 100 at number 99, marking its seventh and last week on the chart.

== Track listings ==
CD single
No.	Title	Length
1.	"Tokyo (Vampires & Wolves)"	3:51
2.	"Tokyo (Vampires & Wolves)" (Grum Remix)	5:23

iTunes EP
No.	Title	Length
1.	"Tokyo (Vampires & Wolves)"	3:51
2.	"Tokyo (Vampires & Wolves)" (Grum Remix)	5:23
3.	"Tokyo (Vampires & Wolves)" (SiN Remix)	4:08
4.	"Tokyo (Vampires & Wolves)" (AutoKratz Koenji Remix)	4:53
5.	"Tokyo (Vampires & Wolves)" (Superhumanoids Remix)	3:05

== Personnel ==
- Matthew Murphy – vocals, guitar, Casiotone MT-45, various synths
- Tord Øverland Knudsen – backing vocals, bass guitar, Moog synthesizer, piano, percussion
- Daniel Haggis – backing vocals, drums, piano, various synths

== Charts ==
Chart (2010)	Peak position
Australia (ARIA)	33
Europe (European Hot 100 Singles)	71
Germany (GfK)	78
Netherlands (Single Top 100)	66
Scotland Singles (OCC)	23
Switzerland Airplay (Schweizer Hitparade)	72
UK Singles (OCC)	23

== Certifications ==
Region	Certification	Certified units/sales
Australia (ARIA)	Gold	35,000^{^}
United Kingdom (BPI)	Gold	400,000^{‡}
^{^} Shipments figures based on certification alone.^{‡} Sales+streaming figures based on certification alone.

== Release history ==
Region	Date	Format	Label	Catalogue
United Kingdom	24 September 2010	Digital download	14th Floor	B0041X915M
United Kingdom	27 September 2010	CD single	14th Floor	B0041X915M
