= Busy Bein' Born =

Single by Middle Class Rut

from the album No Name No Color
- Released: 2011
- Genre: Alternative rock: post-hardcore
- Songwriters: Zack Lopez and Sean Stockham

Middle Class Rut singles chronology
"New Low" (2010)	"Busy Bein' Born" (2011)	"Are You on Your Way" (2012)

"Busy Bein' Born" is a song by Middle Class Rut from their 2010 album No Name No Color. The song ranked #47 on Billboard Rock Songs and #29 on Billboard Alternative Songs in 2011. The song was also included on the band's The Red EP.

== Premise ==
The video details child kidnapping, forced child labor and a Fight Club for children.

== Charts ==
Chart (2011)	Peak position
US Alternative Airplay (Billboard)	26
US Rock Songs (Billboard)	47
