= The Sunshine of Your Youth =

Studio album by Cheerleader
- Released: May 19, 2015
- Recorded: EastWest Studios; The Ballroom Studio; Springhouse Sound
- Genres: Indie pop Alternative rock Nu gaze
- Length: 37:29
- Language: English
- Label: Bright Antenna
- Producer: Mark Needham

Cheerleader chronology
On Your Side (2014)	The Sunshine of Your Youth (2015)

The Sunshine of Your Youth is the debut album by American indie pop band Cheerleader, released in 2015 by Bright Antenna Records. The album release was supported by a nationwide tour with UK act The Wombats.

== Critical reception ==
Spin wrote that the album "showcases a series of fizzy, blurry-eyed tracks: 'A Million Ways' combines dream-rock guitar riffs with sugary-sweet melodies, while the whimsically synthy 'Dreamer' glides into shoegaze territory with frontman Joe Haller’s lo-fi vocals at the forefront." The Saratogian wrote that "the band stays true to their sunny, optimistic name throughout, delivering a record full of hope, wonder, and undeniable warmth."

== Track listing ==
1. New Daze - 3:31
2. The Sunshine of Your Youth - 3:28
3. On Your Side - 4:06
4. Do What You Want - 3:55
5. Perfect Vision - 4:12
6. Haunted Love - 3:50
7. A Million Ways - 4:04
8. Dreamer - 3:12
9. The Quiet Life - 3:48
10. Little Bird - 3:23

== Personnel ==
- Produced and mixed by Mark Needham
- Assistant engineer: Will Brierre
- Mastered by Emily Lazar at The Lodge in NYC, assisted by Rich Morales
- Additional vocals on "On Your Side", "Perfect Vision", and "Dreamer" courtesy of Christa Tubach
- Art direction and design: Ryan Penn
- Band photo: Carrie Davenport
