= Pick Up Your Head =

Studio album by Middle Class Rut
- Released: June 25, 2013
- Genre: Alternative rock Indie rock
- Length: 40:23
- Language: English
- Label: Bright Antenna
- Producer: Self-Produced

Middle Class Rut chronology
No Name No Color (2010)	Pick Up Your Head (2013)	Gutters (2018)

Pick Up Your Head is the second album by Middle Class Rut, released June 25, 2013 by Bright Antenna Records. The album is available as a digital download, CD and 12" double record. Produced by the band, the album was mixed by Dave Sardy.

On April 26, 2013, Loudwire premiered the music video for the single "Aunt Betty".

== Track listing ==
1. Born Too Late - 2:24
2. Leech - 3:02
3. Weather Vein - 3:12
4. No More - 3:21
5. Cut the Line - 3:33
6. Sing While You Slave - 3:01
7. Dead Eye - 4:03
8. Pick Up Your Head - 3:23
9. Police Man - 3:26
10. You Don't Belong - 2:28
11. Aunt Betty - 4:23
12. Take a Shot - 4:08

Deluxe Edition Bonus Tracks

1. I Need to Know (Tom Petty and the Heartbreakers cover) - 2:25
2. Nothin' - 4:42

== Singles ==
Year	Song	Peak chart positions	
Year	Song	US Alt.	US Active Rock.
2013	"Aunt Betty"	34	38
