= Spring Tigers (EP) =

Spring Tigers (Mini-LP)

EP by Spring Tigers
- Released: October 19, 2009
- Genre: Pop; Indie Rock
- Length: 17:35
- Label: Bright Antenna
- Producer: Sep V

Spring Tigers is the debut mini-LP by Spring Tigers, released October 19, 2009, under exclusive US license to Bright Antenna. The album was made available as a digital download, CD and Limited Edition 10" record.

== Track listing ==
1. Car Song - 2:16
2. Hyboria - 3:02
3. Just Suggesting - 3:22
4. Beep Beep - 2:51
5. New Improved Formula - 2:01
6. Stripmalls in the Sun - 4:05

== Personnel ==
Spring Tigers

- Drums - Chase Prince
- Keys - Stephen James
- Bass - Eli Barnard
- Guitar - Shane Davis
- Vocals/Guitar - Kris Barratt

Technical personnel

- Engineered by Joel Hatstat at The Bakery
- Produced by Sep V
- Mixed by Mark Needham
- Mastered by Andy VanDette at Masterdisk NYC
