= Faded (EP) =

EP by Flagship
- Released: July 10, 2015
- Genre: Alternative rock
- Length: 20:25
- Language: English
- Label: Bright Antenna
- Producer: Flagship; Leonardo Solis (Tracks 1, 2, 3, & 5); Joel Khouri (Track 4)

Flagship chronology
Flagship (2013)	Faded (2015)	The Ladder (2018)

Faded is an EP by American alt-rock band Flagship, released July 10, 2016 by Bright Antenna Records. The album was made available as a Digital Download, and CD. The video for "I Want You" premiered on Earmilk.

== Track listing ==
1. "Merry Us Carry Us" - 3:47
2. "Not So Bad" - 3:13
3. "Faded" - 4:18
4. "I Want You" - 4:00
5. "Nothin'" - 5:07

== Personnel ==
- Produced by Leonard Solis (Tracks 1, 2, 3, & 5) and Joel Khouri (Track 4)
- Mixed by Leonard Solis (Tracks 1, 2, 3, & 5) and Jeremy Sh Griffith (Track 4)
- Mastered by Ryan Smith (Tracks 1, 2, 3, & 5) and Greg Calbi (Track 4)
- A&R by Braden Merrick
