= Magic Wands =

American alternative rock band

- Origin: Nashville, Tennessee, United States
- Genres: Dream pop, post-punk, new wave
- Years active: 2008–present
- Labels: Ark Recordings, Bright Antenna, Cleopatra, Casa del Puente Discos, Metropolis
- Members: Chris Valentine; Dexy Valentine
- Website: magicwandsband.com

Magic Wands is an American rock band, originally from Nashville, Tennessee, and currently based in Los Angeles, California.

== History ==
The band was formed by Dexy Valentine (guitar, keyboards, vocals) and Chris Valentine (guitar, vocals) in summer 2008, after Chris found a copy of Dexy's song "Teenage Love" and the two got in touch. Dexy moved from Los Angeles to Nashville and the two began to write music together. The name of the band stemmed from the gift of a magic wand from Chris to Dexy while the two were living on opposite sides of the country.

Their first single, "Black Magic", was released on 7" vinyl in 2008 by Ark Recordings. In late 2009, the band signed to indie label Bright Antenna and released their first EP, Magic Love & Dreams, recorded in New York City with producer John Hill (Santigold/Lykke Li). Prefix's review gave the album a 7 out of 10 score, with critic Matthew Richardson writing, "The whole EP is covered with the cosmic haze of dream-pop, while the Valentines maintain the attitude of punk kids".

On February 17, 2010, RCRD LBL released a download of the track "Warrior", remixed by the xx.

The Wands' debut studio album, Aloha Moon, was announced on the Spin website on February 7, 2012, along with a stream of the single "Space". Reviewer David Marchese wrote that the track was "a sexy and propulsive stunner...a really cool song, suggestive of the darker side of '80s pop and brighter side of falling in love".

On April 5, 2012, RCRD LBL premiered the band's non-album cover of the Madonna song "Burning Up".

Aloha Moon was released on April 24, 2012, by Bright Antenna. The band toured as openers for the Jesus and Mary Chain in summer 2012.

Magic Wands relocated to Los Angeles, and recorded their second album, Jupiter The album marked a change in approach, as Dexy Valentine noted.

While the album was being mixed, Dexy Valentine reformed her prior band, Bonfire Beach, self-releasing the digital album Lit in 2013, issuing an eponymous 2014 album on Cleopatra Records and touring with the Dandy Warhols. Meanwhile, Chris Valentine traveled, studied ancient sound healing Magic Wands also contributed a cover of David Bowie's "Cat People (Putting Out Fire)" to the 2015 Cleopatra tribute album A Salute to the Thin White Duke – The Songs of David Bowie.

Jupiter was eventually released by Cleopatra on February 26, 2016.

On May 18, 2018, the band released their third studio album, Abrakadabra on Argentine label Casa Del Puente Discos. That same month, Magic Wands also self-released the Portals digital-only compilation album collecting B-sides, demos and other unreleased recordings. A vinyl edition of Abrakadabra was released on July 13 by US label Etxe Records., Abrakadabra on Los Angeles, California, and Washington, DC–based label on vinyl offering a full-length digital download with bonus track "Puzzle of Love". Argentina based label Casa Del Puente Discos is providing CD versions of the release.

== Discography ==
=== Studio albums ===
- Aloha Moon (2012, Bright Antenna)
- Jupiter (2016, Cleopatra Records)
- Abrakadabra (2018, Etxe Records & Productions [Vinyl]; Casa Del Puente Discos
- Illuminate (2020, self-released)
- SWITCH (May 12, 2023, Metropolis Records)

=== EPs ===
- Magic Love & Dreams 12"/CD EP (2009, Bright Antenna)

=== Singles ===
- "Black Magic" 7" (2008, Ark Recordings)
- "Warrior (The xx Remix)" digital single (2010, RCRD LBL)
- "Black Magic (D. Sardy Mix)" promo CDr (2012, Bright Antenna)
- "Burning Up" (Madonna cover) digital single (2012, RCRD LBL)

=== Compilation albums ===
- Portals (2018, self-released)

=== Compilation appearances ===
- "Cat People (Putting Out Fire)" (David Bowie cover) on A Salute to the Thin White Duke - The Songs of David Bowie (2015, Cleopatra Records)
