= Magic Love & Dreams EP =

Magic Love & Dreams

EP by Magic Wands
- Released: May 25, 2009
- Genre: Dream pop
- Length: 12:23
- Language: English
- Label: Bright Antenna
- Producer: John Hill

Magic Wands chronology
Magic Love & Dreams	Aloha Moon

Magic Love & Dreams is the debut EP by Magic Wands, released May 25, 2009 on the Bright Antenna label. The album was made available as a digital download, CD and a limited-edition 12" picture disc. It was released in the UK on July 6, 2009 by Young and Lost Club Records on standard black vinyl 12" with an extra track.

== Track listing ==
=== US/Japan release ===
1. Black Magic - 2:35
2. Starships - 3:17
3. Teenage Love - 3:17
4. Kiss Me Dead - 3:14

=== UK release ===
1. Kiss Me Dead - 3:14
2. Warrior - 3:24
3. Black Magic - 2:35
4. Teenage Love - 3:17
5. Starships - 3:17
