= Aloha Moon =

Studio album by Magic Wands
- Released: April 24, 2012
- Genre: Dream pop
- Length: 34:45
- Language: English
- Label: Bright Antenna
- Producers: Sep V, Dave Sardy

Magic Wands chronology
| Magic Love & Dreams (2009) | Aloha Moon (2012) | Jupiter (2016) |

Professional ratings
Aggregate scores
| Source | Rating |
|---|---|
| Metacritic | 67/100 |
Review scores
| Source | Rating |
| COMA Music Magazine | (Favorable) |

Aloha Moon is the debut studio album by American dream pop band Magic Wands, released on April 24, 2012, by Bright Antenna. The album was made available as a digital download, CD and vinyl LP. It was produced by Sep V and Dave Sardy.

== History ==
The album was announced on the Spin website on February 7, 2012, along with a stream of the single "Space".

On February 28, 2012, the music video for "Space" premiered at Paper.

On March 12, 2012, Sep V's remix of "Black Magic" premiered at Prefix Magazine.

The album was released by Bright Antenna on April 24, 2012.

== Track listing ==
=== Vinyl edition ===
1. Aloha Moon
2. Teenage Love
3. Kaleidoscope Hearts
4. Crystals
5. Warrior
6. Black Magic
7. Treasure
8. Wolves
9. Kiss Me Dead
10. Space (Sep V Mix)

=== Digital/CD version ===
1. Aloha Moon
2. Teenage Love
3. Kaleidoscope Hearts
4. Crystals
5. Warrior
6. Black Magic
7. Treasure
8. Wolves
9. Kiss Me Dead
10. Space (D. Sardy Mix)

=== Digital deluxe version ===
1. Aloha Moon
2. Teenage Love
3. Kaleidoscope Hearts
4. Crystals
5. Warrior
6. Black Magic
7. Treasure
8. Wolves
9. Kiss Me Dead
10. Space (D. Sardy Mix)
11. Heartbreak Whirl
12. Warrior (D. Sardy Mix)
13. Space (Sep V Mix)
14. Black Magic (Sep V Mix)
15. Space (Radio Edit)

== Use In Media ==
Black Magic was a playable song in the game Rocksmith 2014.
