= If You Want It =

Single by Orchestral Manoeuvres in the Dark

from the album History of Modern
- B-side: "Alone"; "Idea 1"
- Released: 6 September 2010
- Recorded: 2007–2010
- Studio: Motor Museum, Liverpool
- Genre: Synth-pop
- Length: 4:45 (album version); 4:04 (single edit)
- Label: 100% Bright Antenna
- Songwriters: OMD, Tracey Carmen
- Producer: OMD

Orchestral Manoeuvres in the Dark singles chronology
"Universal" (1996)	"If You Want It" (2010)	"Sister Marie Says" (2010)

Audio video
- "f You Want It" on YouTube

"If You Want It" is the thirty-first UK single by the English electronic band Orchestral Manoeuvres in the Dark (OMD), released on 6 September 2010 by 100% Records as the first single from their eleventh studio album "History of Modern". It is the group's first single since "Universal" in 1996, and is the first single with the original line-up since "Dreaming" in 1988. The song was a top 50 hit in Germany.

The track was previewed, along with "History of Modern (Part II)" on their website during August and was announced as the album's first single. The artwork was revealed later that month.

== Music video ==
The music video for "If You Want It" was released on the band's website on 16 August 2010. It shows a group of dancers performing underneath the spotlight while the two band members watch the display.

== Track listing ==
=== CD single, Germany (10 September 2010) ===
1. "If You Want It" – 4:42
2. "Alone" – 4:24
3. "If You Want It" (Villa Nah Remix) – 4:24
4. "If You Want It" (Club Royale Remix) – 3:25

=== Vinyl single, UK (6 September 2010) ===
1. "If You Want It" (radio edit) – 3:59
2. "Idea 1"

=== CD single, UK (10 September 2010) ===
1. "If You Want It" (French Horn Rebellion Remix) – 3:47
2. "If You Want It" (We Have Band) – 5:04
3. "If You Want It" (Villa Nah Remix) – 4:24
4. "If You Want It" (Club Royale Remix) – 3:24
5. "If You Want It" (Teeth Remix) – 4:10
6. "If You Want It" (Syntomatix Remix) – 6:29

== Personnel ==
- Toby Harris – sleeve design
- Peter Saville – design
- Robin Schmidt – mastering
- Mike Crossey – mixing (tracks 1 and 2), OMD*
- Morgan Price – additional mixing (tracks 1 and 2)
- Oliver Buchannan – additional mixing (tracks 1 and 2)
- Guy Katsav – mixing, additional programming (track 8)
- OMD – production (all tracks), mixing (tracks 3, 7, 9–12)
- All tracks mastered at 24-96 Mastering
- Recorded and mixed at The Motor Museum Studio, Liverpool

== Chart performance ==
Chart	Peak position
German Singles Chart	49
UK Singles Chart	176
