= History of Modern =

Studio album by Orchestral Manoeuvres in the Dark
- Released: 20 September 2010
- Recorded: 2007–2010
- Studios: Motor Museum, Liverpool
- Genre: Synth-pop
- Length: 58:02
- Labels: 100% Bright Antenna
- Producer: OMD

Orchestral Manoeuvres in the Dark chronology
Messages: OMD Greatest Hits (2008)	History of Modern (2010)	English Electric (2013)

Singles from History of Modern
- 1. "If You Want It" Released: 6 September 2010; 2. "Sister Marie Says" Released: 15 November 2010; 3. "History of Modern (Part I)" Released: 28 February 2011

History of Modern is the eleventh studio album by the English electronic band Orchestral Manoeuvres in the Dark (OMD), released on 20 September 2010 by 100% Records. It is their first studio album since 1996, and the first to feature the classic four-piece OMD line-up since 1986's The Pacific Age. It was recorded remotely, with band members compiling the tracks via the Internet.

History of Modern received generally positive reviews and peaked at number 28 on the UK Albums Chart. It was a hit in Germany, reaching number 5 – the group's highest chart placing for an album in that country. The record was released in the US on Bright Antenna on 28 September 2010.

On 2 March 2011 an EP, History of Modern (Part I) was released containing remixes and B-sides from History of Modern.

== Background ==
OMD reformed in 2006 with its classic line-up of Andy McCluskey, Paul Humphreys, Martin Cooper and Malcolm Holmes (singer McCluskey had used the OMD moniker as a solo project from 1989 to 1996). Following the band's reunion, there was renewed public interest; a planned nine-date tour evolved into 50 shows. The group determined there would be sufficient interest in a new studio album. It was recorded remotely, with tracks compiled via the Internet.

A free download demo track taken from the album, titled "Sister Marie Says", was released on 25 November 2009 and featured backing vocals from British classical crossover soprano Keedie Babb. The song dates to 1981 and was almost included on Universal (1996), but was shelved. The second track to be played from the record was "History of Modern (Part II)"; it was aired on 31 May 2010 on BBC Radio 6 Music.

The artwork for History of Modern was conceived by Peter Saville and designed by Four23. The title was devised by McCluskey after he took his daughter to an art exhibition called "The History of Modernism".

Remixes and B-sides from the History of Modern sessions were included on the EP History of Modern (Part I) (2011).

== Singles ==
"If You Want It" was released as the first single on 6 September 2010. It was OMD's first single since 1996's "Universal". In October, "Sister Marie Says" was announced as the album's second single, and was released on 15 November 2010. The third single, "History of Modern (Part I)" was remixed in radio and extended forms, and was released on 28 February 2011.

== Reception ==
Professional ratings
Review scores
Source	Rating
AbsolutePunk	88%
The A.V. Club	C+
DIY	3.5/5 stars
Evening Standard	4/5 stars
Hampshire Chronicle	4/5 stars
Mojo	3/5 stars
MusicOMH	3.5/5 stars
Q	4/5 stars
Spin	7/10
Urb	3.5/5 stars

History of Modern was met with generally positive reviews. The Daily Telegraph critic Neil McCormick described the album as "extraordinarily good, a belting synth-pop classic crammed with catchy tunes and complicated lyrics about matters of life and death, art and philosophy." Q were also complimentary, noting that OMD's "winning way with a rattling pop tune is timeless" and that the record "refines their sound and gives it a modern production tweak". A mildly favourable Roy Wilkinson of Mojo wrote, "As reiterated via his work for Atomic Kitten, singer Andy McCluskey rarely struggles for hooks". Conversely, BBC reviewer John Doran was unimpressed, stating, "A few highs aside, this is a poor return from the 80s hit-makers... it's not too late for OMD to stride all the way back to greatness. But this album isn't even a stumble in the right direction."

Classic Pop ranked History of Modern fifth in their "Top 20 Reunion Albums", noting that it echoes OMD's "golden period" of the early 1980s. In a poll of 3,200 Modern Synthpop readers, it was voted the 12th-best synth-pop album of the 2010s.

== Track listing ==
No.	Title	Writer(s)	Length
1.	"New Babies; New Toys"	McCluskey	3:52
2.	"If You Want It"	McCluskey/Tracey Carmen	4:45
3.	"History of Modern (Part I)"	McCluskey	4:41
4.	"History of Modern (Part II)"	Humphreys/McCluskey	4:13
5.	"Sometimes"	McCluskey	3:46
6.	"RFWK"	McCluskey	3:46
7.	"New Holy Ground"	Humphreys/McCluskey	3:42
8.	"The Future, The Past, and Forever After"	McCluskey	4:52
9.	"Sister Marie Says"	McCluskey	4:00
10.	"Pulse"	McCluskey/Remee/Ali Tennant/Mich Hansen/Joseph Belmaati	3:42
11.	"Green"	Humphreys/McCluskey/Stuart Kershaw	4:17
12.	"Bondage of Fate"	Humphreys/McCluskey/Hannah Peel	4:06
13.	"The Right Side?"	McCluskey/Simon Leonard/David Baker	8:20

US bonus track
No.	Title	Length
14.	"Save Me" (Contains vocals by Aretha Franklin from original recording of "Save Me" on Atlantic Records)	3:08

== B-sides and other tracks ==
"Alone" – B-side to digital download and CD versions of "If You Want It" single.
"Idea 1" – B-side to limited edition 7" vinyl single of "If You Want It".
"The Grand Deception" – B-side to CD version of "Sister Marie Says".
"History of Modern, Pt. III & IV" – B-side to limited edition 7" vinyl single of "Sister Marie Says".

== Personnel ==
=== Orchestral Manoeuvres in the Dark ===
- Andy McCluskey – lead and backing vocals, bass guitar
- Paul Humphreys – keyboards, backing vocals
- Martin Cooper – keyboards
- Malcolm Holmes – drums, percussion programming

=== Studio personnel ===
- Mike Gould – percussion (track 1)
- Jessica Stavely-Taylor – backing vocals (track 3)
- Jessica Samuel – backing vocals (track 3)
- Monika Blomeid – backing vocals (track 3)
- Stuart Kershaw – piano and string arrangement (track 5)
- Jennifer John – backing vocals (track 5)
- Lucy Styles – backing vocals (track 5)
- Doreen Edwards – backing vocals (track 8)
- Guy Katsav – extra programming, co-production (track 9)
- Szhirley Rokahaim – backing vocals (track 10)
- Anna Ord – backing vocals (track 10)
- Abigail Clancy – backing vocals (track 10)
- Hannah Peel – organ, backing vocals, samples (track 12)

== Chart performance ==
History of Modern reached No. 5 on the German Albums Chart, OMD's highest ever position there. It also cracked the national albums charts of several countries including reaching No. 97 in the Netherlands, No. 63 in Switzerland, No. 36 in Austria and No. 28 in the United Kingdom where it reached No. 3 on the official independent chart as well, remaining 12 weeks in the top 50.

=== Charts ===
Chart (2010)	Peak position
Austrian Albums (Ö3 Austria)	36
Belgian Albums (Ultratop Wallonia)	74
Dutch Albums (Album Top 100)	97
European Top 100 Albums	18
French Albums (SNEP)	181
German Albums (Offizielle Top 100)	5
Scottish Albums (Official Charts)	30
Swiss Albums (Schweizer Hitparade)	63
UK Albums (Official Charts)	28
UK Album Downloads (Official Charts)	23
UK Independent Albums (Official Charts)	3
