= Hello (The Capes album) =

Studio album by The Capes
- Released: October 11, 2005; February 28, 2006; January 10, 2007
- Genre: Indie rock
- Label: Hard Soul Records; Fabtone Records (Japan)
- Producer: Lenny Franchi

Professional ratings
Review scores
Source	Rating
Allmusic	link
Pitchfork Media	(6.6/10) link

Hello is the debut album by South London five-piece, The Capes. It was released by Hard Soul Records mid-October 2005 in the UK and on February 28, 2006, in the US.

The album sees the band expanding on the promise of their 2005 Taste EP, fusing catchy Britpop-style hooks with complex arrangements, harmonies and splashes of synth.

== Track listing (UK & US) ==
1. Mexican Broads
2. Super Girls
3. What You Want
4. Carly
5. First Base
6. Francophile (Version 1.5)
7. Shinjuki Hi-5
8. Comet Tails
9. Tightly Wound
10. Stately Homes
11. Gimme
12. Sun Roof
