= Backfire at the Disco =

- Cover of the original release.

Single by the Wombats

from the album A Guide to Love, Loss & Desperation
- Released: 9 April 2007; 21 April 2008
- Genre: Indie rock
- Label: 14th Floor
- Songwriters: Dan Haggis, Tord Øverland Knudsen, Matthew Murphy

The Wombats singles chronology
"Moving to New York" (2006)	"Backfire at the Disco" (2007)	"Kill the Director" (2007)

Additional Artwork
- Cover of the re-release.

"Backfire at the Disco" is a single from British indie band, the Wombats. It is from their debut album, The Wombats Proudly Present: A Guide to Love, Loss & Desperation. It was originally released on April 9, 2007, but was re-released on April 21, 2008.

== Formats and track listings ==
Track listings of major single releases of "Backfire at the Disco".

=== First release ===
UK CD single
(Released April 9, 2007)

1. "Backfire at the Disco"
2. "Backfire at the Disco (KGB Remix)

UK 7" single (Gatefold Sleeve, Coloured Vinyl)
(Released April 9, 2007)

1. "Backfire at the Disco"
2. "Little Miss Pipedream"

UK 7" single (Picture Disc)
(Released April 9, 2007)

1. "Backfire at the Disco"
2. "Moving to New York (BBC Radio 1 Session)"

=== Second release ===
UK CD single
(Released April 21, 2008)

1. "Backfire at the Disco"
2. "Patience (BBC Radio 1 Live Version)"

UK 7" single (Coloured Vinyl)
(Released April 21, 2008)

1. "Backfire at the Disco (Live from The JD Set feat. Peter Hook)"
2. "Let’s Dance to Joy Division (Live acoustic version)"

UK 7" single (Picture Disc)
(Released April 21, 2008)

1. "Backfire at the Disco (South Central remix)"
2. "Caravan in Wales"

== Reviews ==
In reviews, Backfire at the Disco is said to "gnaw itself into your brain like some kind of tropical disease". It is also said to be one of "three superb singles in a row from The Wombats". The video contains a pastiche of the famous derided 1979 video from Cliff Richard "Wired for Sound". This involves people in lurid spandex outfits on roller skates. The Cliff Richard video is currently in the Top 5 Worst Videos ever made on VH1.

== Charts ==
Chart (2007)	Peak position
UK Singles (OCC)	67
Chart (2008)	Peak position
UK Singles (OCC)	40
