= Moving to New York =

- Cover of the original release

Single by The Wombats

from the album A Guide to Love, Loss & Desperation
- Released: 26 October 2006; 14 January 2008
- Genre: Indie rock
- Label: 14th Floor Records
- Songwriter: The Wombats

The Wombats singles chronology
"Moving to New York" (2006)	"Backfire at the Disco" (2007)

Additional artwork
- Cover of the re-release

"Moving to New York" is the debut single by English band the Wombats, taken from their debut album A Guide to Love, Loss & Desperation. It was originally released as a non-album single on 7-inch, in limited edition packaging, on 26 October 2006; it was re-released on 14 January 2008, two months after the release of the album.

"Moving to New York" is considered one of the band's signature songs. Like one of their other signature songs, "Let's Dance to Joy Division", the song was written by lead singer Matthew Murphy after an experience he had at a nightclub in the band's home city of Liverpool; however, whereas "Let's Dance to Joy Division" was inspired by spending a joyous night out with his then-girlfriend, Murphy wrote "Moving to New York" after being told by a girl he liked that she was going to stay in for the night before he went out to a nightclub and saw her there.

"Moving to New York" was classified silver by the BPI in 2015, meaning it has sold over 200,000 copies in the UK alone.

== Formats and track listings ==
Track listings of major single releases of "Moving to New York".

=== First release ===
UK 7" single (Limited Edition packaging) (released October 26, 2006)

1. "Moving to New York"
2. "Party in a Forest (Where's Laura?)"

=== Second release ===
UK CD single (released January 14, 2008)

1. "Moving to New York"
2. "Moving to New York" (Kyte remix)

UK 7" single (Gatefold Sleeve, coloured vinyl)

1. "Moving to New York"
2. "Moving to New York" (Paul van Dyk remix)

UK 7" single (picture disc)

1. "Moving to New York"
2. "(Everything I Do) I Do It for You (XFM Session)"

== Reception ==
Critics of the single have said that "the song is upbeat and catchy". The Unreality Music website described the song as "one of those joyous, frenetic noise-fests".

== In the media ==
The song was used in the end credits of the sitcom The Inbetweeners in the episode "Thorpe Park".

The song was remixed and released as a single by trance music DJ/producer Paul van Dyk.

== Charts ==
=== Weekly charts ===
Chart (2008)	Peak position
European Hot 100 Singles (Billboard)	48
Scotland Singles (OCC)	16
UK Singles (OCC)	13

=== Year-end charts ===
Chart (2008)	Position
UK Singles (OCC)	126

== Certifications ==
Region	Certification	Certified units/sales
United Kingdom (BPI)	Platinum	600,000^{‡}
^{‡} Sales+streaming figures based on certification alone.
