= Cheerleader (band) =

American indie pop band

Background information
- Origin: Philadelphia, Pennsylvania, U.S.
- Genres: Indie pop, nu gaze
- Years active: 2012–2021
- Label: Bright Antenna
- Members: Joe Haller; Paul Impellizeri; Josh Pannepacker
- Website: cheerleadersounds.com

Cheerleader was an American indie pop band from Philadelphia, Pennsylvania, United States. Formed in 2012, the band signed in 2013 to Bright Antenna Records and have so far released a 7-inch single, "Perfect Vision"/"Waiting Waiting", in the United Kingdom, the On Your Side EP in the United States, an LP, The Sunshine of Your Youth, released May 19, 2015, and a single, "Bang, Bang", in the United States, on May 30, 2019.

== History ==
The band was formed in 2012 in Connecticut by schoolmates Joe Haller and Chris Duran. When the duo moved to Philadelphia in 2013 they began to produce and release demos on SoundCloud which drew attention from the likes of NME and Nylon. The group expanded to a five-piece with the addition of Paul Impellizeri, Josh Pannepacker and Carl Bahner. After a year of tours which included the festivals CMJ, the NME stage at Great Escape and SXSW, the band signed to Bright Antenna Records in 2013 where they have released two singles, an EP and their debut LP entitled The Sunshine of Your Youth. Their next album, Almost Forever, was released in 2020.

In early 2021, Cheerleader released an album of demos written between the two studio albums, Demos 2016–2018, and announced their retirement.

== Band members ==
=== Current ===
- Joe Haller – vocals, guitar
- Paul Impellizeri – bass guitar, vocals
- Josh Pannepacker – keys, guitar
- Sean Donaghy – drums

=== Former ===
- Carl Bahner – drums
- Chris Duran – lead guitar

== Discography ==
=== Extended plays ===
- On Your Side (Bright Antenna, October 7, 2014)

=== Studio albums ===
- The Sunshine of Your Youth (Bright Antenna, May 19, 2015)
- Almost Forever (Bright Antenna, February 7, 2020)

=== Singles ===
- "Perfect Vision" / "Waiting Waiting" (Bright Antenna/Young And Lost Club, April 28, 2014)
- "Bang, Bang" (Bright Antenna, May 30, 2019)
