= History of Modern (Part I) =

EP by Orchestral Manoeuvres in the Dark
- Released: 28 February 2011
- Recorded: The Motor Museum Studio, Liverpool, UK
- Genre: Synth-pop; house
- Length: 49:55 (CD version); 15:36 (10" version)
- Language: English
- Label: Blue Noise; 100% (UK); Bright Antenna (US)
- Producer: Self-produced

Orchestral Manoeuvres in the Dark chronology
The OMD Remixes (1998)	History of Modern (Part I) (2011)

History of Modern (Part I) is a 2011 EP by the English electronic band Orchestral Manoeuvres in the Dark (OMD), released on 28 February 2011 by 100% in the UK and Bright Antenna in the US. The EP was released as a digital download, CD and 10" record. Released after the 2010 LP History of Modern, it contains remixes as well as B-sides.

Financial Times music critic Ludovic Hunter-Tilney called the title track "a storming dance-pop number with muscularly rippling synths and surging vocals: a song to rank with any in their back catalogue".

== Track listings ==
=== CD ===
Side one

1. "History of Modern (Part I)" – 4:39
2. "History of Modern (Part II)" – 4:11
3. "History of Modern (Part III & IV)" – 2:03
4. "History of Modern (Part I)" (Krystal Klear Remix) – 4:55
5. "History of Modern (Part I)" (Roger Erickson Remix) – 4:38
6. "History of Modern (Part I)" (Selebrities Remix) – 4:21

Side two

1. "History of Modern (Part I)" (OMD's Extended Remix) – 5:32
2. "History of Modern (Part I)" (radio edit) – 3:12
3. "VCR" – 3:26
4. "The Grand Deception" – 3:26
5. "Idea 1" – 4:41
6. "Alone" – 4:22

=== 10" ===
Side A

1. "History of Modern (Part I)" (radio edit) – 3:12
2. "History of Modern (Part I)" (OMD's Extended Remix) – 5:32

Side B

1. "The Grand Deception" – 3:26
2. "VCR" – 3:26

Note: The tracks "VCR" and "The Grand Deception" appear in reverse order on Side B due to either a printing or pressing error.
