= Jump into the Fog =

"Jump Into the Fog"

Single by The Wombats

from the album This Modern Glitch
- Released: 24 January 2011
- Recorded: 2010
- Genre: Alternative dance; synthpop; alternative rock
- Length: 3:37
- Label: 14th Floor Records; Bright Antenna
- Songwriter(s): The Wombats
- Producer(s): Rich Costey

The Wombats singles chronology
"Tokyo (Vampires & Wolves)" (2010)	"Jump Into the Fog" (2011)	"Anti-D" (2011)

"Jump Into the Fog" is a song by English rock band The Wombats from their second studio album, This Modern Glitch. The single was released in the UK on 23 January 2011 as a digital download in EP form, including three B-sides: "How I Miss Sally Bray", "Valentine", and "Addicted to the Cure". It debuted at No. 35 on the UK Singles Chart on 30 January 2011, marking the band's sixth top 40 hit.

== Critical reception ==
Popped Music blog gave the song a positive review, stating:

The Wombats have raised the bar somewhat with this track. It poses an interesting question as to what their forthcoming album will sound like. Their usual sound is very upbeat and very indie pop disco. This, however, has a darker sound, for them at least. It feels a little more sober, and for once they may not have decided to release an indie disco classic. This shows a little more maturity in terms of sound. Fret not though Wombats fans, they haven't changed so much that you won't recognise them.

== Chart performance ==
"Jump Into the Fog" debuted on the UK Singles Chart at No. 35 on 30 January 2011, marking the band's sixth top 40 hit and the second single to reach the top 40 from This Modern Glitch. It was also their first song to enter the US Billboard Alternative Songs chart, with a peak position of number 15.

== Track listing ==
Digital download
No.	Title	Length
1.	"Jump Into the Fog"	3:37
2.	"How I Miss Sally Bray"	3:24
3.	"Valentine"	3:58
4.	"Addicted to The Cure"	3:41

== Charts ==
Chart (2011–12)	Peak position
UK Singles (OCC)	35
US Rock Songs (Billboard)	30
US Alternative Songs (Billboard)	15

== Release history ==
Region	Date	Format
United Kingdom	23 January 2011	Digital download
United Kingdom	24 January 2011	Vinyl
