= Middle Class Rut =

American band

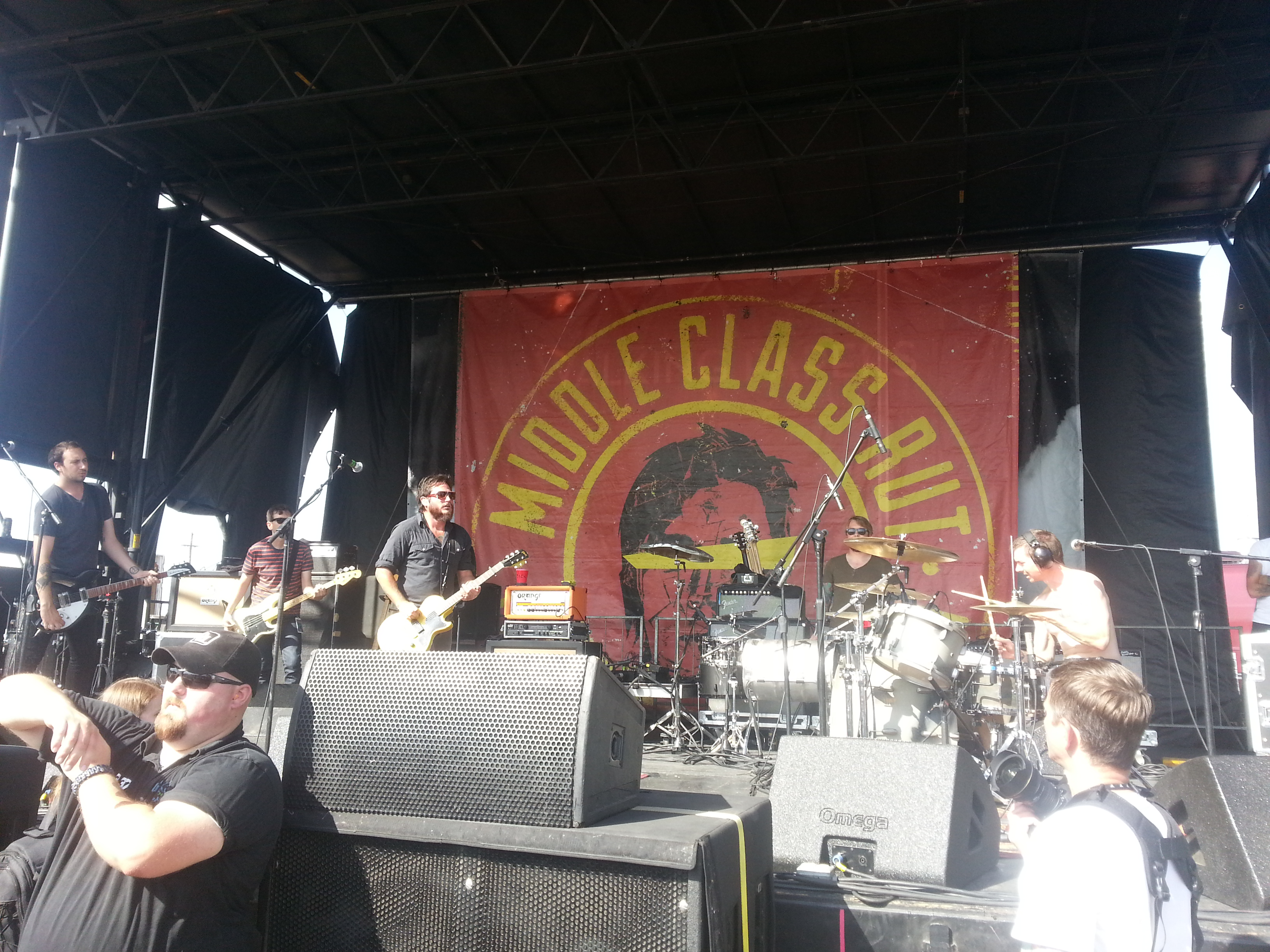

Background information
- Origin: Sacramento, California, United States
- Genres: Alternative rock, post-punk, indie rock
- Years active: 2006–2015, 2017–present
- Labels: Bright Antenna; Kids (UK)
- Members: Zack Lopez; Sean Stockham
- Website: Middle Class Rut myspace, Middle Class Rut website

Middle Class Rut, also known as MC Rut, is an American alternative rock band duo consisting of vocalist/guitarist Zack Lopez and vocalist/drummer Sean Stockham. They were formed in Sacramento, California in December 2006. After several EP's, in 2010 they released their first full-length LP, No Name No Color. Their second album, Pick Up Your Head, was released June 25, 2013. After a brief hiatus, the band returned in 2018 with their third album, Gutters.

== Biography ==
Middle Class Rut was formed after the dissolution of Lopez and Stockham's previous band, Leisure, which was signed to DreamWorks Records in 2000 when Lopez and Stockham were in their teens. Leisure came to an end in 2003 and, after taking a hiatus from performing, Lopez and Stockham came together again to form Strangler, which would soon after be renamed Middle Class Rut.

The band played its first major national tour in the fall of 2007 with Receiving End Of Sirens and Envy On The Coast. Alternative Press reviewed MC Rut's live performance, saying "…it's mind-blowing to witness the sheer depth and complexity of the sound these two guys are capable of unleashing on their own…but once the novelty subsides, you're left with incendiary post-rock with visible traces of '90s alternative." The band toured with Burning Brides during July 2008 and 3 during October 2008.

In late 2007 Sacramento alternative rock station KWOD 106.5 FM (defunct) featured Middle Class Rut's "New Low" as part of its on-air local band feature. KWOD DJ/Music Director Andy Hawk received the submission direct from the band, and KWOD DJ Rubin played "New Low" later that day. "New Low" reacted immediately and was quickly added to regular rotation. The song became one of the most requested of the year, and KWOD developed a relationship with the band. At the end of 2008, "New Low" was voted top song of the year by KWOD listeners in an online poll conducted by the station. Throughout 2008, Zack and Sean did numerous live interviews with KWOD DJs Rubin and Andy Hawk to promote local MC Rut shows. KWOD's parent company flipped the station's format in mid-2009 to an all 1990s format. During a local show after the flip, Middle Class Rut singer/guitarist Zack Lopez made mention of it by saying, "There's been a death in Sacramento. KWOD 106.5 gave us and a lot of good local bands a chance to be heard by a much bigger audience than we could ever get on our own. So thank you, KWOD. We'll miss you."

The band released two self-titled EPs, referred to as the Red EP and the Blue EP due to their respective colors, in early 2008, as well as a limited-edition 7" in the UK on November 24, 2008, which featured "Busy Bein' Born" and "All Walks of Life".

In September 2008, the band came to the attention of BBC Radio 1 DJ, Zane Lowe, who then featured their song, "Busy Bein' Born", as his Single of the Week during the week of October 20, 2008. In November 2008, the band was profiled in the Radar section of NME magazine, which described them as "...epic noise alchemists...," and played a five-stop tour in London, England for the first time. On November 19, 2008, the band recorded a live session for BBC One in Studio Four of the BBC's Maida Vale Studios. After this tour, Kerrang! magazine wrote in its December 12, 2008 issue, "[Their] sound is nothing short of colossal, and one that a mere two-piece shouldn't be able to create, combining the boisterous swagger and pomp of Jane's Addiction and the feral fury of Rage Against the Machine.", and Rocksound's December 2008 Christmas issue pegged them as "Ones to Watch", saying, "Their debut double A-side single 'Busy Bein' Born'/'All Walks of Life' is a breath of fresh air in the midst of the musical stench that emo is now emitting."

On March 10, 2009, Zane Lowe of Radio 1 debuted a new song called 'I Guess You Could Say' and named it as his Hottest Record in the World. The song is featured on the EP, 25 Years.

On May 1, 2009, Middle Class Rut performed at the 2009 Road Recovery Benefit show at the Nokia Theatre in New York.

During a concert in Cesar Chavez Park in Sacramento, California on June 19, 2009, lead singer Zack Lopez announced that Middle Class Rut would be releasing their debut album for which they had recently been recording new material. Lopez did not announce a release date. Outside a concert in Montreal, QC on March 17, 2010, Lopez said the new album was going to be out hopefully next summer.

Middle Class Rut opened for Social Distortion at the end of 2009, and Alice In Chains for the second half of their 2010 tour. They also opened for Them Crooked Vultures in Los Angeles, CA on April 14, 2010, and Las Vegas, Nevada on April 17, 2010. On October 4, 2010, Middle Class Rut released their full-length album, No Name No Color in the United States and November 22, 2010, in the UK.

On October 30, 2010, Middle Class Rut opened for Chevelle's second night of the 10 Year Anniversary show at the Metro in Chicago, IL. Chevelle singer and guitarist Pete Loeffler is a fan of Middle Class Rut.

On December 17, 2010, Middle Class Rut opened "The Night 89x Stole Christmas" show featuring Middle Class Rut, Sick Puppies and My Chemical Romance at the Fillmore in Detroit, Michigan.

In February 2011, Middle Class Rut opened for 30 Seconds to Mars at the Main Street Armory in Rochester, New York. On May 21, 2011, Middle Class Rut opened "DC101 Chili Cook-Off" featuring Middle Class Rut, Paper Tongues, Neon Trees, Panic! at the Disco, Papa Roach, Seether and Weezer at RFK Stadium grounds in Washington, D.C.

The band appeared on the 2011 Vans Warped Tour.

Starting February 2012, Middle Class Rut co-headlined tour the United States with Chevelle and Janus.

On April 26, 2013, Loudwire premiered the music video for the single "Aunt Betty".

For Record Store Day 2014 the band released a limited edition 7" Factories/Indians featuring previously unreleased tracks.

On September 18, 2015, Zack Lopez announced via the band's Facebook account that the band was on an indefinite hiatus, due to scheduling and recording purposes of the duo.

On September 9, 2017, the band successfully completed a Kickstarter campaign to fund the third album. According to a post on the band's official Facebook page, the third album was estimated to be released in May 2018.

== Members ==
- Zack Lopez - vocals, guitar
- Sean Stockham - vocals, drums, percussion, guitar

== Discography ==
=== Studio albums ===
List of studio albums
Title	Album details
No Name No Color	Released: October 5, 2010; Label: Bright Antenna; Formats: CD, LP, digital download
Pick Up Your Head	Released: June 25, 2013; Label: Bright Antenna; Formats: CD, LP, digital download
Gutters	Released: August 3, 2018; Label: Self-released; Formats: CD, LP (Deluxe Version), digital download

=== Extended plays ===
List of extended plays
Title	EP details
Middle Class Rut: Blue EP	Released: 2008; Label: Self-released; Formats: LP
Middle Class Rut: Red EP	Released: 2008; Label: Self-released; Formats: LP
Busy Bein' Born/All Walks of Life	Released: 2008; Label: KIDS, Bright Antenna; Formats: LP
Busy Bein' Born/Start to Run	Released: 2009; Label: Bright Antenna; Formats: LP
25 Years	Released: May 26, 2009; Label: Bright Antenna; Formats: CD, LP, digital download

=== Singles ===
List of singles, with selected chart positions, showing year released and album name
Title	Year	Peak chart positions			Album
Title	Year	US Alt.	US Main. Rock	US Rock	Album
"All Walks of Life"	2008	—	—	—	Non-album single
"I Guess You Could Say"	2009	—	—	—	Non-album single
"New Low"	2010	6	38	12	No Name No Color
"Busy Bein' Born"	2011	26	—	47	No Name No Color
"Hurricane"	2011	—	—	—	Non-album single
"Are You on Your Way"	2012	33	—	—	No Name No Color
"Aunt Betty"	2013	38	31	—	Pick Up Your Head
"Dead Eye"	2013	—	—	—	Pick Up Your Head
"Pick Up Your Head"	2014	—	—	—	Pick Up Your Head
"Factories/Indians"	2014	—	—	—	Non-album single
"No Sale"	2018	—	—	—	Gutters
"—" denotes a recording that did not chart or was not released in that territory.
