= Beware of Darkness (band) =

American rock band

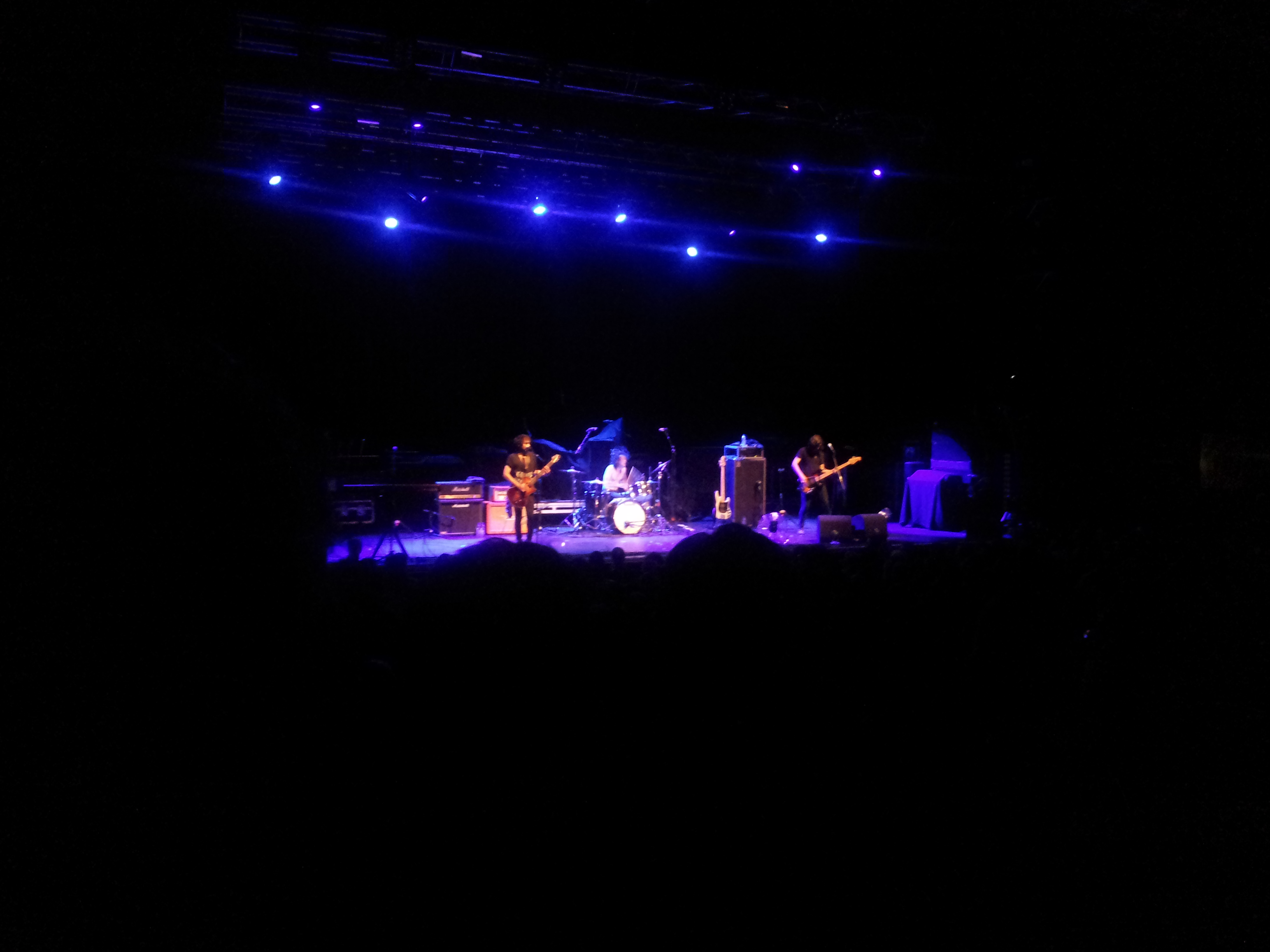
- Beware of Darkness, as support act to The Smashing Pumpkins, 2013

Background information
- Origin: Santa Barbara, California, U.S.
- Genres: Alternative rock; indie rock; blues rock; hard rock; garage rock
- Years active: 2010–2020; 2021–present
- Label: Bright Antenna
- Past members: Kyle Nicolaides; Daniel Curcio; Lionel Forrester Jr.; Tony Cupito
- Website: bewareofdarknessmusic.com

Beware of Darkness is an American rock band that consisted of vocalist/guitarist Kyle Nicolaides, bassist Daniel Curcio, and drummer Lionel Forrester Jr. Their debut album, Orthodox was released May 7, 2013. Their second album Are You Real? was released on September 16, 2016.

== History ==
=== 2010–2011: Early years ===
Beware of Darkness, named after George Harrison's 1970 song "Beware of Darkness," formed in 2010 after Kyle Nicolaides met Tony Cupito at one of Kyle's acoustic solo shows in downtown Los Angeles at an RnB club called First and Hope. The two began playing shows with various bass players until they met Daniel Curcio, who was visiting Santa Monica after finding out he had a long lost half brother living there. Their first show was at the Roxy Theatre in LA. Not long after solidifying the lineup, they signed a record deal with Bright Antenna Records and began opening up shows for rock legends such as Social Distortion as well as touring with indie act The Wombats.

=== 2012–2014: Orthodox ===
In 2012, Beware of Darkness were asked to open for Tegan and Sara, Stone Temple Pilots, Bush, Deftones and played at the 2012 SXSW Festival. They recorded their debut record Orthodox in Fall 2012 at Eagle Rock Studios, The Village Recorder, The Sound Factory, Hillside Studios and the Valley Recording Company.

Four lyric videos for the tracks included on the band's initial Howl EP were released April 16, 2012, on the website of American Songwriter. The music video for the band's debut single "Howl" premiered on September 14, 2012, on Fuse.

The band's debut record, entitled Orthodox, was released on May 7, 2013, in the United States and was executive produced by Dave Sardy (LCD Soundsystem, Oasis, Band of Horses, NIN, Rage Against the Machine, Gorillaz, Jay-Z, White Denim).

In 2013 after playing at SXSW, Beware of Darkness toured the UK for the 1st time which included an appearance at the famed Reading and Leeds Festival and a tour across Europe as main support for The Smashing Pumpkins The band have performed at several radio festivals and shows with Cage The Elephant, Alice in Chains, AWOLNATION, Thirty Seconds to Mars, Soundgarden and Jane's Addiction. In August 2013, they were nominated by the UK's Classic Rock magazine for "Best New Band" along with Deap Vally and Walking Papers.

The band's song "Howl" has been featured in the video game soundtracks of Saints Row IV, Need for Speed: Most Wanted, EA Sports UFC and Gran Turismo. The song has been featured in several television and movie projects including Stephen King's Under the Dome, Red 2, Monday Night Football and Nitro Circus 3D. On May 15, 2013, the band performed "Howl" live on Conan.

The video of the band's second single "All Who Remain" was premiered by Rolling Stone on December 24, 2013 and has appeared in NBC's Parenthood.

=== 2015–2020: Are You Real? and break-up ===
The band started recording their second studio album in fall of 2015. The band recorded 100 songs during the recording process of Are You Real. The album was released on September 16, 2016. On October 11, 2019, the band released a new single called "Bloodlines". On March 19, 2020, the band announced their break-up.

=== 2021: Unreleased songs and new music ===
On March 19, 2021, exactly one year after announcing the band's break-up, the band announced two new songs, titled "Millennials" and "Infinite In Your Arms", would be released on March 26, 2021. The post continued by saying, "They are a thank you for anyone who has supported the band over the years."

In April 2021, Nicolaides also announced he is continuing to make music as Beware of Darkness and to expect new music and a new LP soon.

== Musical style ==
Beware of Darkness has been described as alternative rock, indie rock, blues rock, hard rock, and garage rock.

== Band members ==
Former members

- Kyle Nicolaides – lead vocals, lead guitar (2010–2020)(2021-Present)
- Tony Cupito – drums, percussion (2010–2017)
- Daniel Curcio – bass (2010–2019)
- Lionel Forrester Jr. – drums, percussion (2017–2019)

== Discography ==
=== Albums ===
List of studio albums
Title	EP details
Orthodox	Released: May 7, 2013; Label: Bright Antenna; Formats: CD, digital download
Are You Real?	Released: September 16, 2016; Label: Bright Antenna; Formats: CD, digital download

=== Extended plays ===
List of extended plays
Title	EP details
Howl EP	Released: April 17, 2012; Label: Bright Antenna; Formats: CD, digital download
Sanctuary Season	Released: February 10, 2015; Label: Bright Antenna; Formats: CD, digital download

=== Singles ===
Title	Year	Peak chart positions	Album
Title	Year	US Main.	Album
"Howl"	2013	6	Orthodox
"All Who Remain"	2013	19	Orthodox
"Muthafucka"	2016	—	Are You Real?
"Dope"	2016	—	Are You Real?
"Are You Real?"	2016	—	Are You Real?
"Summer Daze"	2017	—	Are You Real?
"—" denotes releases that did not chart.
