= Westcoast Songwriter's Conference =

Annual conference in the United States

The Westcoast Songwriter's Conference is an annual conference hosted by the Westcoast Songwriter's organization.

The conference is usually held in San Francisco, California.

== Organization ==
West Coast Songwriters is a 501(c)3 nonprofit educational organization founded in 1979 in California. It has been headed by executive director Ian Crombie since 1988.

== Conference ==
The annual Westcoast Songwriter's Conference offers educational classes on songwriting techniques, live performance skills, navigating contracts and the legal environment of the music and performance industry. Each attendee may schedule song pitching sessions each day with an industry professional.

The conference is staffed by such notables as country writer Steve Seskin, musical director for the Grammy pre-telecast Larry Batiste, record producer and artist development professional Scott Mathews as well as many other industry professionals.

Each night following the day's events, there are concerts where the hits songwriters perform along with the yearly winners of the WCS songwriting contest. The intent of the conference is to enable individual artists and writers to become part of a community which helps to develop, relationships, craft and business skills.
