= Kill the Director =

2007 single by the Wombats

- 2007 release artwork

Single by the Wombats

from the album The Wombats Proudly Present: A Guide to Love, Loss & Desperation
- B-side: Metro Song"; "There She Goes"; "Sunday TV"; "Bleeding Love"
- Released: 25 June 2007
- Length: 2:50
- Label: 14th Floor
- Songwriters: Dan Haggis; Tord Øverland Knudsen; Matthew Murphy
- Producers: Steve Harris; the Wombats

The Wombats singles chronology
"Backfire at the Disco" (2007)	"Kill the Director" (2007)	"Let's Dance to Joy Division" (2007)

"Kill the Director" is a song by English indie rock band the Wombats. Originally released in 2007, the song reached number 35 on the UK Singles Chart. The track was re-released as a download and 7-inch single in 2008 with the 7-inch only being available from the band's website, this time reaching number 48 on the UK chart. The 7-inch re-releases contain cover versions of "There She Goes" by the La's and "Bleeding Love" by Leona Lewis.

== Track listings ==
=== First release ===
UK CD single

1. "Kill the Director"
2. "Kill the Director" (KUT FM live acoustic session)

UK 7-inch single (purple)

A. "Kill the Director"
B. "Metro Song"

UK 7-inch single (red)

1. "Kill the Director"
2. "Kill the Director" (CSS remix)

=== Second release ===
UK CD single

1. "Kill the Director"
2. "There She Goes" (live from Triple J)

UK 7-inch single 1

1. "Kill the Director"
2. "Sunday TV"

UK 7-inch single 2

1. "Kill the Director"
2. "Bleeding Love"

== Chart performance ==
On 6 July 2008, Kill the Director entered the UK Singles Chart at number 93 on downloads alone. The following week, the song moved up to number 48 following the physical release.

=== Weekly charts ===
Chart (2007)	Peak position
Scotland Singles (Official Charts)	27
UK Singles (Official Charts)	35

Chart (2008)	Peak position
Scotland Singles (Official Charts)	35
UK Singles (Official Charts)	48

== Certifications ==
Region	Certification	Certified units/sales
United Kingdom (BPI)	Platinum	600,000^{‡}
^{‡} Sales+streaming figures based on certification alone.
