= 25 Years (EP) =

EP by Middle Class Rut
- Released: May 26, 2009
- Genre: Alternative rock Indie rock
- Length: 28:03
- Language: English
- Label: Bright Antenna
- Producer: Self-produced

25 Years is a 2009 EP by Middle Class Rut, released on May 26, 2009, under exclusive Worldwide license to Bright Antenna. The EP was released as a digital download, CD and 12" record.

== Track listing ==
1. 25 Years - 4:01
2. Dead Set - 4:41
3. I Guess You Could Say - 4:17
4. Busy Bein Born - 4:49
5. Tied Up - 3:51
6. I Don't Really Know - 6:24
