= Pasadena Boys Choir =

- Origin: Pasadena, California
- Genres: Classical music, Pop Music, Folk Music
- Years active: 1925–1957, 1971–2013
- Website: Pasadena Boys Choir (defunct)

The Pasadena Boys Choir was one of the oldest civic boy choirs in the United States, founded in 1925 by Dr. John Henry Lyons, and active until its closure in 2013.

== History ==
Founded in 1925 by Dr. John Henry Lyons as an adjunct of the Pasadena school system, The Pasadena Boys Choir was one of the oldest civic boy choirs in the United States. In 1971, the Choir was reorganized by John Barron, as a private, non-profit educational institution. The Choir was composed of boys between the ages of 8 and 13 from all ethnic and socio-economic backgrounds who attended public, private and parochial schools throughout the greater San Gabriel and San Fernando Valleys. Between 1971 and 2013, over 2,000 boys were members of the Choir.

The organization's admission policy was strictly non-discriminatory and non-denominational and any boy who met the 8-to-13 age requirement was welcome to apply. All members attended their own schools, and the initial time commitment on a boy's part was two, two-hour classes each week, held in the carriage house of a large South Pasadena estate. The large majority of participants originated from the upper-middle-class cities of Pasadena, South Pasadena, and San Marino.

Over the years, the Choir received numerous awards and commendations. Endorsements came from the California Parent Teachers Association, the State Superintendent of Schools, and the California State Legislature in Sacramento.

Training Program

Boys that entered the Pasadena Boys Choir program were initially assigned to a Beginner's Class for at least one semester. There they began a comprehensive training program which eventually prepared them for public performance. The boys received professional instruction in music theory, vocal production, ear training, stage deportment and public speaking. Included in this initial introduction were classical, patriotic, folk, songs from musicals and contemporary pop music.

After successfully completing the beginner's program, boys advanced to the next level of training and were moved to the main performance group. The boys were expected to remain for a full term of training through their eighth grade school year or age 13.

Performances

During a typical season from September to June, the Choir was called upon to perform in a number of varied concert and entertainment venues. Among these were weddings, banquets, conventions and seasonal programs. In addition, the choir received occasional calls from movie, television and other production companies in the Southern California area.

Summer Camp

The choir operated during the normal school year with the exception of a two-week summer camp session during the last week of July and the first week of August, typically held at a hotel away from their Pasadena-area base.

== Closure ==
After 42 years of re-established life under the direction of John R. Barron, the Pasadena Boys Choir closed in June 2013. The closure was attributed to several factors including Mr. Barron's retirement, the departure of his longtime assistant Byron Espina, and the inability to find a suitable replacement music director specialized in boy choir leadership.

In his final remarks, Barron cited changes in public school curriculum, increasing diversification of after-school interests that limited interest in the choir, and economic challenges as primary causes for the choir's shrinking membership. At its peak, the choir had boasted a membership of 130 boys and held a prominent place in Southern California's performing arts community.

The choir gave its final performances on June 8-9, 2013, at St. Edmund's Episcopal Church in San Marino, with current members joined by choir alumni. The nonprofit 501(c)(3) status of the organization was maintained after closure in hopes that someone might eventually revive the choir.

== Notable Performances ==
Notable performances included the choir's recording of William Kraft's "Contextures II: The Final Beast" with the Los Angeles Philharmonic Orchestra under the direction of André Previn in 1986. Another highlight was a 1981 self-published recording of Civil War songs arranged by Alan Boehmer titled "The Union Forever."
