= Bright Antenna Records =

US record label

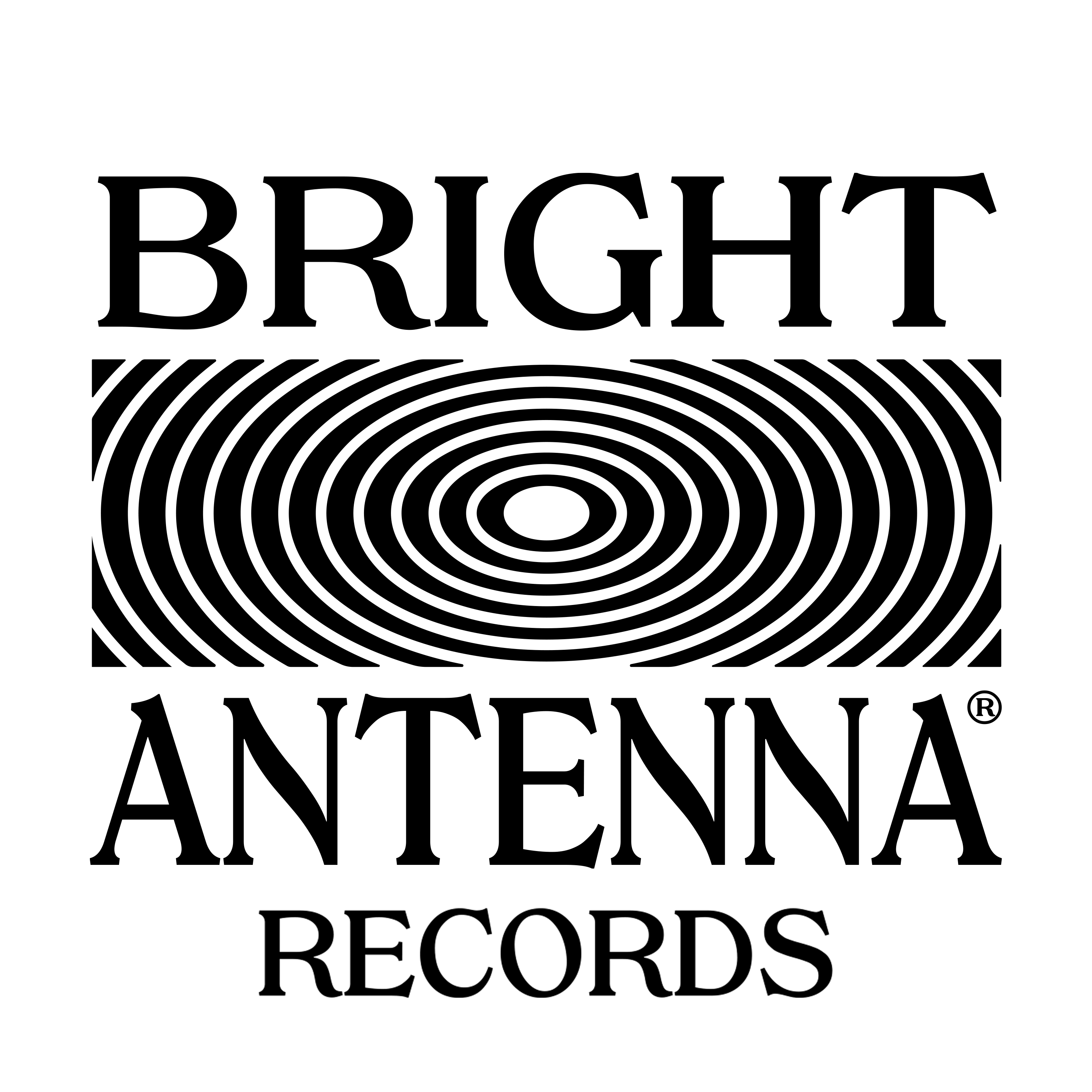
- Founded: 2007
- Founder: Sep V Tiffanie DeBartolo
- Distributor: AWAL
- Genre: Alternative rock; indie pop; synth-pop; indie rock; rock
- Country of origin: United States
- Location: Mill Valley, California
- Official website: brightantenna.com

Bright Antenna Records is an independent record label, founded in 2007 and based in Mill Valley, California. The label was created by producer Sep V and by writer Tiffanie DeBartolo and named after the lyrics to the song "The Spirit of Radio" by Rush. Bright Antenna specializes in artist development and, in addition to its label services, operates an online store for its vinyl and specialty products. BA's staff includes A&R veteran Braden Merrick, who discovered and broke The Killers.

== Roster ==
As of July 2025, Bright Antenna's roster of artists includes:

- Akira Galaxy
- Meg Elsier
- Khatumu
- Martin Luke Brown
- East Forest
- Fana Hues
- Lee Lewis
- Love Fame Tragedy
- Prep
- Sports Team
- Wilderado
- Windser
- The Wombats

== Past artists ==
- Beware of Darkness
- Cheerleader
- Cloud Castle Lake
- Dan The Man (of The Wombats)
- Far
- Flagship
- In The Valley Below
- Jimmy Gnecco (of Ours)
- Kyle Nicolaides
- Love Thy Brother
- Margolnick (of Flagship)
- Magic Wands
- Middle Class Rut
- Mona
- Orchestral Manoeuvres in the Dark (OMD)
- Paul Hartnoll (of Orbital)
- trubbleboy
- Roman Lewis
- Robert Smith (of The Cure)
- Reuben Hollebon
- Spring Tigers
- The Catholic Comb
- Zack Lopez (of Middle Class Rut)

== Discography ==
- Akira Galaxy – What's Inside You (EP) (2024)
- Beware of Darkness – Howl EP (2012)
- Beware Of Darkness – Howl (single) (2013)
- Beware of Darkness – Orthodox (2013)
- Beware of Darkness – Sanctuary Season (2015)
- Beware Of Darkness – Dope (single) (2016)
- Beware Of Darkness – Muthafucka (single) (2016)
- Beware Of Darkness – Are You Real? (single) (2016)
- Beware of Darkness – Are You Real? (2016)
- Beware Of Darkness – Summer Daze (single) (2017)
- The Catholic Comb – The Catholic Comb EP (2008)
- The Catholic Comb – Vampire Life (2008)
- Cheerleader – Perfect Vision/Waiting Waiting (2014)
- Cheerleader – On Your Side (2014)
- Cheerleader – The Sunshine of Your Youth (2015)
- Cheerleader – Bang, Bang (single) (2019)
- Cloud Castle Lake – Twins (single) (2017)
- Cloud Castle Lake – Bonfire (single) (2017)
- Cloud Castle Lake – Malingerer (single) (2018)
- Cloud Castle Lake – Genuflect (single) (2018)
- Cloud Castle Lake – Malingerer (2018)
- Cloud Castle Lake – The Meeting (Original Motion Picture Soundtrack) (2018)
- Dan The Man – Something Good (single) (2017)
- Dan The Man – Circadian Circus (2017)
- Fana Hues – Hues (2020)
- Fana Hues - Moth (2024)
- Fana Hues – fana + flora (2022)
- Far – Pony (2009)
- Flagship – blackbush EP (2012)
- Flagship – Break The Sky (single) (2013)
- Flagship – Flagship (2013)
- Flagship – Are You Calling (single) (2014)
- Flagship – I Want You (single) (2015)
- Flagship – Faded EP (2015)
- Flagship – You Shook Me All Night Long (single) (2017)
- Flagship – Midnight (single) (2017)
- Flagship – The Electric Man (2017)
- Flagship – Philadelphia Babe (single) (2018)
- Flagship – The Ladder (EP) (2018)
- In The Valley Below – Bloodhands (Oh My Fever) (single) (2017)
- In The Valley Below – Elephant EP (2017)
- In The Valley Below – Desperate Dance (single) (2018)
- In The Valley Below – Rise (single) (2019)
- In The Valley Below – Blue Sky Drugs (single) (2019)
- In The Valley Below – The Pink Chateau (2019)
- Jimmy Gnecco – Bring You Home (2010)
- Jimmy Gnecco – The Heart (2010)
- Jimmy Gnecco – The Heart X Edition (2011)
- Khatumu – free therapy (EP) (2025)
- Kyle Nicolaides – American Hymns (single) (2018)
- Kyle Nicolaides – American Hymns (acoustic) (single) (2018)
- Kyle Nicolaides – Space Between Us (single) (2018)
- Kyle Nicolaides – Now Or Nowhere Vol. 1 (2018)
- Lee Lewis – Something Burning (2024)
- Love Fame Tragedy – Life Is A Killer (2024)
- Love Thy Brother – Love Me Better (feat. Ariel Beesley) (single) (2016)
- Love Thy Brother – Arrested (feat. Norma Jean Martine) (single) (2018)
- Magic Wands – Magic Love & Dreams (2009)
- Magic Wands – Teenage Love (Single) (2012)
- Magic Wands – Space (Single) (2012)
- Magic Wands – Black Magic (Single) (2012)
- Magic Wands – Aloha Moon (2012)
- Magic Wands – Space 19 (single) (2019)
- Magic Wands – Kaleidoscope Hearts 19 (single) (2019)
- Magic Wands – Black Magic 19 (single) (2019)
- Magic Wands – Aloha Moon 19 (2019)
- Margolnick – Sugar Cube City (2021)
- Margolnick – Pop-tart EP (2018)
- Meg Elsier – spittake (deluxe) (album)(2025)
- Middle Class Rut – 25 Years (2009)
- Middle Class Rut – All Walks of Life/Busy Bein' Born (2008)
- Middle Class Rut – Busy Bein' Born/Start to Run (2009)
- Middle Class Rut – New Low (single) (2010)
- Middle Class Rut – No Name No Color (2010)
- Middle Class Rut – Hurricane (2011)
- Middle Class Rut – Aunt Betty (single) (2013)
- Middle Class Rut – Pick Up Your Head (2013)
- Middle Class Rut – Factories/Indians (2014)
- Mona – In The Middle (2017)
- Mona – Kiss Like A Woman (single) (2018)
- Mona – Not Alone (single) (2018)
- Mona – Thought Provoked (single) (2018)
- Mona – Soldier On (2018)
- Mona – Better Now (single) (2018)
- Mona – Goons (single) (2019)
- Orchestral Manoeuvres In The Dark – Save Me (single) (2010)
- Orchestral Manoeuvres In The Dark – If You Want It (single) (2010)
- Orchestral Manoeuvres In The Dark – History of Modern (2010)
- Orchestral Manoeuvres In The Dark – If You Want It (2010)
- Orchestral Manoeuvres In The Dark – Sister Marie Says (2010)
- Orchestral Manoeuvres In The Dark – History of Modern (part I) (2011)
- Orchestral Manoeuvres In The Dark – Live In Berlin (2011)
- Paul Hartnoll feat. Robert Smith – Please (2007)
- PREP – PREP (2020)
- PREP – As It Was (single) (2022)
- PREP – The Programme (2024)
- Reuben Hollebon – Faces (single) (2015)
- Reuben Hollebon – Haystacks (single) (2015)
- Reuben Hollebon – Terminal Nostalgia (2015)
- Reuben Hollebon – On & On (single) (2016)
- Reuben Hollebon – On & On EP
- Roman Lewis – Mindless Town (single) (2018)
- Roman Lewis – Midnight in Paris (single) (2018)
- Roman Lewis – Rose (single) (2018)
- Roman Lewis – Ways (single) (2018)
- Roman Lewis – Heartbreak (for now) (2019)
- Sports Team – Here It Comes Again (single) (2019)
- Sports Team – M5 (single) (2019)
- Sports Team – Deep Down Happy (2020)
- Spring Tigers – Spring Tigers (2009)
- The Catholic Comb – The Catholic Comb – EP (2009)
- The Wombats – 1996 (single) (2011)
- The Wombats – Anti–D (single) (2011)
- The Wombats – Jump Into the Fog (single) (2011)
- The Wombats – Our Perfect Disease (single) (2011)
- The Wombats – Techno Fan (single) (2011)
- The Wombats – Tokyo (Vampires & Wolves) (single) (2010)
- The Wombats – The Wombats (2008)
- The Wombats – The Wombats Proudly Present: This Modern Glitch (2011)
- The Wombats – Your Body Is a Weapon (single) (2013)
- The Wombats – Glitterbug (2015)
- The Wombats – Beautiful People Will Ruin Your Life (2018)
- Various Artists – Bright Antenna Record Store Day Compilation (2015)
- Wilderado – Sorrow (single) (2018)
- Wilderado – You Don't Love Me (single) (2018)
- Wilderado – Favors (2018)
- Wilderado – Favors (Acoustic) (2018)
- Wilderado – Surefire (2019)
- Wilderado – Surefire (Piano) (2020)
- Wilderado – CFS (2020)
- Wilderado – Revenant (2020)
- Wilderado – Take Some Time (2020)
- Wilderado – Head Right (2021)
- Wilderado – Talker (2024)
- Windser – Where the Redwoods Meet the Sea (2023)
- Windser – Windser (album) (2025)
- Zack Lopez – I Don't Know (single) (2016)
- Zack Lopez – Bonzo Rathet (single) (2016)
- Zack Lopez – Bloodlines (2016)
- Zack Lopez – Life On The Run (2016)
