= Oedipus (band) =

American rock band

- Origin: Los Angeles
- Genres: Rock, indie rock, alternative rock
- Years active: 2001–2013
- Spinoffs: JJXO
- Members: Jeremy Haffner; Stephen Cohen; Keith Larsen
- Website: oedipusband.com

Oedipus was a rock band from Los Angeles. The band consisted of Jeremy Haffner (lead vocals, bass guitar), Stephen Cohen (guitar, vocals) and Keith Larsen (drums, vocals). The band's influences included Rage Against the Machine, Tool, Muse, 311 and Incubus, among others.

In 2013, Haffner and Cohen called the end of Oedipus. They are now part of a musical project JJXO.

== History ==
=== Formation and first releases (2001–2009) ===
Jeremy Haffner and Stephen Cohen first met each other through local youth hockey team at the age of 6. "In 1997, we were the first California youth team to ever win a National Championship," says Cohen. The two musicians formed a band when they were teens, in 2001.

Rhinelander native drummer Keith Larsen moved to California, and was accepted to Cal State Long Beach University's graduate music master's program. For two years he was attending class during the day, and performing gigs with several different groups in the evenings. He graduated in the spring of 2004, and although at that time he was in a band that was quite popular, he wasn't optimistic about its future. One day Larsen was discussing various options with the band's producer Darian Cowgill, and heard music he wasn't familiar with. "I asked Darian what he was listening to, and where I could get the CD," said Larsen. "He answered, 'Oh, this is one of my groups, Oedipus. You know, they're looking for a drummer.' I couldn't believe my ears. They were great!" Larsen auditioned for the position, and as Jeremy Haffner was impressed, Larsen joined Oedipus line-up in 2004 and played his first concert with the band in February 2005.

The band has recorded and self-released albums Humbility (2005) and Covetous (2008), as well as two EPs. They have also self-booked and promoted their own tours throughout the U.S. In a May 2012 interview with portal wSzczecinie.pl, Jeremy Haffner said that the band had been working to sign a record deal in the U.S. for a long time. They even got an audition at Columbia Records in New York City and the record company loved them, but asked Oedipus to get back to them in six months with some new material. In the meantime, Columbia employees were let go, and the band was back to square one.

=== Success in Europe and Vicious Little Smile (2010–2012) ===
In 2010, Oedipus released a single titled "Tres Las", which received some critical acclaim. Among others, DJs from Polish radio station Eska Rock found the song on the Internet and started playing it on Eska Rock. One evening the band was surfing their Facebook page, and began getting hundreds of friend requests from teens in Poland. As they searched YouTube, they found a fan-produced video of "Tres Las" with over 40,000 views. The song received a lot of airplay in Europe, going number one in Poland. "We were apparently huge over there," said Larsen. "We had music execs from over there wanting to fly us over for shows. It was kind of insane."

The band played its first concert in Poland in October 2010, and got the full "rock star" treatment. After a three-day trip full of media interviews, the band came back to Los Angeles. "We went from being treated like superstars to just being normal guys again," said Larsen. "But we knew we had something." The hit song and trip to Poland landed Oedipus record and publishing deals in Poland and Germany. The follow-up single "Burn It Down" became another hit in Europe, and two Oedipus songs were featured on the Polish version of the contemporary hits album Now That's What I Call Music, next to stars like Katy Perry and Snoop Dogg. The band returned to Poland in 2011 and 2012, headlining Ursynalia festival in Warsaw. "That was our first huge concert experience. We played in front of tens of thousands of people. It was intense," said Larsen.

In 2011, Oedipus signed a worldwide recording deal with THC Music/Rocket Science/Sony RED and on March 13, 2012, an album titled Vicious Little Smile was released.

=== JJXO (2013) ===
In 2013, Haffner started a musical project called JJXO, to take a break after touring with Oedipus. Joined by Stephen Cohen, they released their debut EP Split Lip Serenade in July 2013, distributed by Paradise Artists and available as a free download. Shortly after, drummer/percussionist David Cannava (Mad in the Hat) and keyboardist Chris Woods (CityZen, The Memorials) joined the band. JJXO represents more electronic sound than Oedipus records. In January 2014, Haffner revealed that he and Cohen had called the end of Oedipus a year before.

== Band members ==
- Jeremy Haffner – lead vocals, bass (2001–2013)
- Stephen Cohen – guitar, vocals (2001–2013)
- Keith Larsen – drums, vocals (2004–2013)

== Discography ==
=== Studio albums ===
Title	Album details
Humbility	Released: January 26, 2005; Label: Swollen Foot Music
Covetous	Released: August 25, 2008; Label: Oedipus
Vicious Little Smile	Released: March 13, 2012; Label: Thom Hazaert Company

=== Extended plays ===
Title	Album details
Holding Out for More	Released: 2011

== Music videos ==
Song	Year	Album	Director(s)	Source
"Tres Las"	2011	Vicious Little Smile	Red Earth	
"Gimme a Chance"	2011	Vicious Little Smile	Red Earth	
"Kiss on the Fist"	2012	Vicious Little Smile	Red Earth	
