= A Guide to Love, Loss & Desperation =

Studio album by The Wombats
- Released: 5 November 2007
- Recorded: Rockfield Studios, Monmouth, Wales; Electric Lady Studios, New York City, United States; Brick Lane, London, England; RAK Studios, London, England
- Genres: Indie rock, post-punk, new wave
- Length: 44:24
- Label: 14th Floor
- Producers: Stephen Harris, The Wombats, Jimmy Robertson

The Wombats chronology
Girls, Boys and Marsupials (2006)	A Guide to Love, Loss & Desperation (2007)	This Modern Glitch (2011)

Singles from A Guide to Love, Loss & Desperation
- 1. "Moving to New York" Released: 26 October 2006; 2. "Backfire at the Disco" Released: 9 April 2007; 3. "Kill the Director" Released: 25 June 2007; 4. "Let's Dance to Joy Division" Released: 8 October 2007

Professional ratings
Aggregate scores
Source	Rating
Metacritic	65/100
Review scores
Source	Rating
AllMusic	3/5 stars
Digital Spy	4/5 stars
The Guardian	3/5 stars
LAUNCHcast	(7/10)
NME	(7/10)
Pitchfork Media	(5.9/10)
Spin	3.5/5 stars
stv.tv	3/5 stars
This Is Fake DIY	4/5 stars
Yahoo! Music UK	3.5/5 stars

The Wombats Proudly Present: A Guide to Love, Loss & Desperation, usually shortened to A Guide to Love, Loss & Desperation, is the debut international studio album by English rock band the Wombats. It was released by 14th Floor Records on 5 November 2007. Most of the songs first appeared on the band's 2006 Japan-only album Girls, Boys and Marsupials. A DVD to accompany the album includes footage of the band at the South by Southwest festival, along with music videos from their recent singles.

The album was recorded at Rockfield Studios and reached No. 11 on the UK Albums Chart. It contains a pregap before the first track, which contains the band attempting to make wine glasses "ring" and extolling the virtues of the French wine Beaujolais, ending with them performing a mock advert for Beaujolais. The album had sold 335,361 copies in the UK as of April 2015.

== Track listing ==
All lyrics are written by Matthew Murphy, except where noted; all music is composed by the Wombats, except where noted.

No.	Title	Length
1.	"Tales of Girls, Boys & Marsupials" (lyrics by the Wombats)	1:10
2.	"Kill the Director"	2:42
3.	"Moving to New York"	3:31
4.	"Lost in the Post"	3:06
5.	"Party in a Forest (Where's Laura?)"	3:27
6.	"School Uniforms"	3:14
7.	"Here Comes the Anxiety"	2:31
8.	"Let's Dance to Joy Division"	3:11
9.	"Backfire at the Disco"	3:13
10.	"Little Miss Pipedream"	4:12
11.	"Dr. Suzanne Mattox PhD" (includes elements from the chorus of "Help Me, Rhonda", by the Beach Boys)	3:33
12.	"Patricia the Stripper"	4:01
13.	"My First Wedding" (track ends at 4:36. hidden track; Tales of Girls, Boys and Marsupials piano instrumentation version)	6:38

iTunes bonus tracks
No.	Title	Length
14.	"Derail and Crash"	3:29
15.	"Metro Song"	3:51

Bonus DVD
No.	Title	Length
1.	"Let's Dance to Joy Division" (video)
2.	"Kill the Director" (video)
3.	"Backfire at the Disco" (video)
4.	"Moving to New York" (video)
5.	"The Wombats in Austin"
6.	"Found Footage"

== Personnel ==
- Matthew Murphy – vocals, guitar, synthesizers, piano
- Dan Haggis – backing vocals, drums, synthesizers, piano, stylophone, harmonica, melodica
- Tord Øverland-Knudsen – backing vocals, bass, synthesizers, cello
- Llangattock Primary School – kids choir on "Let's Dance to Joy Division"
- Ian McNabb - banjo

== Charts and certifications ==
=== Weekly charts ===
Chart (2007)	Peak position
Australian Albums (ARIA)	35
Dutch Albums (MegaCharts)	57
UK Albums Chart (OCC)	11
US Heatseeker Albums	20

Chart (2023)	Peak position
Hungarian Albums (MAHASZ)	39

=== Year-end charts ===
Chart (2008)	Position
UK Albums (OCC)	74

=== Certifications ===
Region	Certification	Certified units/sales
Australia (ARIA)	Gold	35,000^{^}
United Kingdom (BPI)	Platinum	300,000^{^}
^{^} Shipments figures based on certification alone.
