= Orthodox (album) =

Studio album by Beware of Darkness
- Released: May 7, 2013
- Recorded: Eagle Rock Studios; The Village Recorder; The Sound Factory; Hillside; Valley Recording Company
- Genres: Alternative rock; blues rock; garage rock; hard rock
- Length: 45:24
- Label: Bright Antenna
- Producers: Kyle Nicolaides; Dave Sardy; Greg Gordon

Beware of Darkness chronology
Howl EP (2012)	Orthodox (2013)	Sanctuary Season (2015)

Singles from Orthodox
- 1. "Howl" Released: May 7, 2013; 2. "All Who Remain" Released: May 7, 2013

Orthodox is the debut studio album by American rock band Beware of Darkness, released May 7, 2013 by Bright Antenna Records. The album was made available as a digital download, CD and double vinyl.

== Track listing ==
All songs written by Kyle Nicolades, except "All Who Remain" written by Kyle Nicolades/John 5

No.	Title	Length
1.	"Howl"	4:03
2.	"Sweet Girl"	2:35
3.	"Ghost Town"	4:25
4.	"Amen Amen"	4:09
5.	"All Who Remain"	3:43
6.	"Heart Attack"	3:34
7.	"Morning Tea"	4:19
8.	"End of the World"	3:00
9.	"Life on Earth?"	3:46
10.	"My Planet Is Dead"	3:35
11.	"Salvation Is Here"	4:44
12.	"Hummingbird"	3:39
13.	"Be My Exorcist (bonus track)"	3:16

== Charts ==
Chart (2013)	Peak position
US Heatseekers Albums (Billboard)	30

== Personnel ==
Beware of Darkness

- Kyle Nicolaides – lead vocals, lead guitar
- Daniel Curcio – bass
- Tony Cupito – drums, percussion

Additional

- Executive Producer: D. Sardy
- Produced by Greg Gordon & Kyle Nicolaides
- Engineered by Greg Gordon, & Claudio Cueni
- Mixed by D. Sardy
- “Sweet Girl”, “Life On Earth” & “Hummingbird” mixed by Claudio Cueni
- “Ghost Town” mixed by Mark Needham
- Mastered by Stephen Marcussen
- Photography by Miguel Starcevich
- Design by Kii Arens
- A&R by Braden Merrick
- Additional Musicians: Drums on “Sweet Girl by Joey Benenati Cello on “Ghost Town” by Stevie Blacke Vocals on “Ghost Town” by Elsie Kunkel
- Intro of “End of the World” engineered by Sep V. & Paul Glueckert
