= Let's Dance to Joy Division =

Single by the Wombats

from the album A Guide to Love, Loss & Desperation
- Released: 8 October 2007
- Genre: Indie rock
- Label: 14th Floor
- Songwriter(s): The Wombats

The Wombats singles chronology
"Kill the Director" (2007)	"Let's Dance to Joy Division" (2007)	"Moving to New York" (2008)

"Let's Dance to Joy Division" is a song by British rock band the Wombats, released as the second single from their debut album A Guide to Love, Loss & Desperation. The song was made available to download on 8 October 2007, with a physical release one week later. It is based on a drunken night out experienced by lead singer Matthew Murphy at Le Bateau, a nightclub in the band's home city of Liverpool, during which he and his then-girlfriend danced on a table to "Love Will Tear Us Apart" by Joy Division. The lyrics examine the irony of dancing happily to a famously sad song.

It is considered to be one of the band's signature songs. There is a hidden track on the 7" vinyl version of the single which features bassist Tord Knudsen singing the Postman Pat theme song in his native Norwegian. "Let's Dance to Joy Division" features on the BBC Three show Scallywagga as the theme song, and is featured in an episode of the BBC Three show Uncle. The song also includes backing singers from Llangattock School, a local primary school located close to the famous Rockfield Recording Studios, Monmouth.

== Formats and track listings ==
Track listings of major single releases of "Let's Dance to Joy Division".

UK CD single
(Released 15 October 2007)

1. "Let's Dance to Joy Division"
2. "Let's Dance to Joy Division (KGB Remix)"

UK 7" single (numbered yellow vinyl)
(Released 15 October 2007)

1. "Let's Dance to Joy Division"
2. "Derail and Crash"
3. "Postman Pat in Norwegian" (hidden track)

UK 7" single (numbered clear vinyl)
(Released 15 October 2007)

1. "Let's Dance to Joy Division"
2. "Tales of Girls, Boys and Marsupials (Live from Fuji Rocks)"
3. "School Uniforms (Live from Fuji Rocks)"

== Chart performance ==
On 14 October 2007, the single entered the UK Singles Chart at No. 35 on downloads alone. A week later, after a physical release, it peaked at #15, before falling gradually down the chart in the following weeks.

The song also came in at No. 12 in the Triple J Hottest 100 of 2007.

It reached No. 19 on the Dutch Singles Chart.

It reached No. 76 on the Australian Singles Chart.

It was the Free Single of the Week on iTunes Store on 2 June 2008.

It was featured in Matchstick Productions' Claim, as the music featured for Swedish freeskier Jacob Wester.

== Awards ==
On 28 February 2008, "Let's Dance to Joy Division" won an NME Award for Best Dancefloor Filler.

== Charts ==
Chart performance for "Let's Dance to Joy Division"
Chart (2007–2008)	Peak position
Australia (ARIA)	76
Netherlands (Single Top 100)	19
Scotland (OCC)	10
UK Singles (OCC)	15

== Certifications ==
Certifications for "Let's Dance to Joy Division"
Region	Certification	Certified units/sales
United Kingdom (BPI)	Platinum	600,000^{‡}
^{‡} Sales+streaming figures based on certification alone.
