= New Low (song) =

2010 song by Middle Class Rut

"New Low" is a song written by Zack Lopez and Sean Stockham recorded by Middle Class Rut from their 2008 Extended Play Red and their 2010 album No Name No Color. The song is featured in the NBA 2K12 soundtrack.

== Charts ==
Chart (2010–11)	Peak position
Canada Rock (Billboard)	31
US Alternative Songs (Billboard)	6
US Mainstream Rock (Billboard)	38
US Hot Rock Songs (Billboard)	12
