= Flagship (band) =

American rock band

- Origin: Charlotte, North Carolina
- Genres: Alternative rock
- Years active: 2011–present
- Label: Bright Antenna Records
- Members: Drake Margolnick; Michael Finster; Matthew Padget; Chris Comfort; Grant Harding

Flagship is an American rock band from Charlotte, North Carolina. Formed in 2011, the group consists of Drake Margolnick (vocals, guitar), Michael Finster (drums), Matthew Padget (lead guitar, backing vocals), Chris Comfort (bass guitar), and Grant Harding (keyboards, synths).

== History ==
The band is a combination of two earlier Charlotte acts: Campbell the Band and Margolnick's solo work. In late 2011, the band signed to Bright Antenna Records. They left Bright Antenna at some point between the release of The Ladder EP in April 2018 and the self-released Faces on the Wall in September 2024.

The band toured with The Wombats in spring 2012. Reviewers noted the band's "power and emotion," coupled with their songs' "dreamlike quality."

On May 8, 2012, the band released their debut EP entitled blackbush available on iTunes and as a physical CD available at shows.

Flagship's self-titled debut album was released on October 8, 2013. The first song off the new album "Are You Calling" was premiered in a lyric video on the website Metrolyrics on July 12, 2013.

== Band members ==
- Drake Margolnick – vocals, guitar
- Michael Finster – drums
- Matthew Padget – lead guitar, backing vocals
- Chris Comfort – bass guitar
- Grant Harding – keyboards, synths

== Discography ==
=== Studio albums ===
- Flagship (Bright Antenna, October 8, 2013)
- The Electric Man (Bright Antenna, March 10, 2016)
- Faces on the Wall (Flagship, September 4, 2024)

=== Extended plays ===
- blackbush EP (Bright Antenna, May 8, 2012)
- Faded EP (Bright Antenna, July 10, 2015)
- The Ladder EP (Bright Antenna, April 13, 2018)
