= WXKS =

WXKS may refer to:

- WXKS (AM), a radio station (1200 AM) licensed to Newton, Massachusetts, United States
- WXKS-FM, a radio station (107.9 FM) licensed to Medford, Massachusetts, United States
- WKOX (AM), a radio station (1430 AM) licensed to Everett, Massachusetts, United States, which used the call sign WXKS from 1979 until 2010
