= WKOX =

WKOX may refer to:

- WKOX (AM), a radio station (1430 AM) licensed to Everett, Massachusetts, United States
- WXKS (AM), a radio station (1200 AM) licensed to Newton, Massachusetts, United States, which used the call sign WKOX from 1947 until 2010
- WROR-FM, a radio station (105.7 FM) licensed to Framingham, Massachusetts, United States, which used the call sign WKOX-FM from 1959 until 1971
