= Pebbles (radio personality) =

American radio personality (born 1964)

- Born: Susan Lynne Semedo; August 29, 1964 (age 62); Wareham, Massachusetts
- Presenting career
- Style: Radio personality
- Country: United States
- Previous shows: Celebrity gossip, entertainment, news on WILD, Boston. (1988–1995); The Baltazar & Pebbles Morning Show on WJMN, Boston (1995–2001); The Ramiro & Pebbles Morning Show on WJMN (2001–2012); The GetUp Crew with Ramiro, Pebbles, Leroy & Melissa on WBQT, Boston (2013-2026)
- Website: hot969boston.com/podcasts/voices-with-pebbles/

Susan Lynne Semedo ("Pebbles") (born August 29, 1964) is an American radio presenter, personality, and voice-over artist in the Boston, Massachusetts, area.

== Early life and education ==
Pebbles is Cape Verdean and a native of Wareham, Massachusetts. Her mother, Henrietta (Lopes) Semedo, was an office manager and her father, Kenneth Semedo, was a radiologic technician who retired in 1989. As she grew up, she had dreams of being a lawyer, pediatrician, or newscaster.

After graduating from Sacred Heart High School in Kingston, Massachusetts in 1982, Pebbles attended Northeastern University in Boston first as an engineering student, but later switched majors, and graduated with a degree in communications studies.

== Career ==
She started her radio career in 1988 in Boston at WILD 1090, a station with a predominantly African-American audience, first as a midday on-air personality, before becoming part of the station's morning show.

In 1995, Pebbles left WILD for JAM'N 94.5 (WJMN), a Boston hip-hop FM radio station, to co-host the "Baltazar & Pebbles Morning Show." While Baltazar left the morning show in 2001, Pebbles remained at WJMN and was paired with Ramiro Torres to form the "Ramiro & Pebbles Morning Show." She interviews celebrities and reports on traffic, news, and entertainment gossip, with segments including Entertainment Update, Fast Facts, and The Ladies Room. She is known for her "big-sister" aura at a station where 18 to 34-year-old women are the largest audience. Her Ladies Room segment includes advice for women on relationships, styles, and careers.

In January 2011, WJMN was ranked fourth in the Boston area, with 1,063,800 listeners, according to Arbitron.

Pebbles also runs her own communications company providing vocals for commercials, web presentations, audio books and phone systems. She writes an online blog called "The Pebbles Perspective".

In an interview with the Boston Globe in 2006, Pebbles said that while interviewing celebrities is definite perk of her job, "I like when we get to talk to audience members and people call in the show. That's the fun part for me."

December 6, 2012 marked Pebbles' last day at Jam'n 94.5 after being released from her contract from Clear Channel. She joined Greater Media's Hot 96.9 and became the new morning drive host, debuting on January 8, 2013. On March 1, Greater Media announced that she would be reunited with Baltazar on the morning show beginning March 4. They remained an on-air team until August 19, 2014, when Baltazar was abruptly replaced by Jermaine Wiggins.

In May 2026, Pebbles stepped down from the Hot 96.9 morning show in order to focus on her "Positively Pebbles" podcast and weekly newsletter.

== Women on-air in Boston ==
Pebbles is credited by New England media critics for her staying power on the morning radio dial, in a field where few women have had such success. Radio industry professionals have said that in the world of popular music radio, where on-air personalities have to have a "colorless lifestyle," Pebbles has made herself relatable to any group.

She also serves as a strong role model to young girls in the Boston area interested in technology and science.

Pebbles is a strong supporter of youth literacy, and spent National Reading Month in March 2011 going to schools to read. Each student in the classrooms received a special backpack, books and school supplies.

Newspaper articles have labeled women hip-hop/pop/rock radio morning show hosts in Boston a "vanishing species," saying that women are often replaced by male personalities who can compete with syndicated male-dominated morning shows.

There are currently a handful of women morning radio hosts and co-hosts on Boston's 20 top-ranked popular music stations, including Pebbles on WBQT, co-host Kennedy on WWBX, Rita Cary on WXRV, and traffic reporter Lisa on the "Matty in the Morning" show on WXKS-FM.

== Etymology of the nickname ==
Pebbles, whose real name is Susan Semedo, was given her radio nickname while at WILD in the 1980s.

Program Director Elroy Smith told her she needed a radio-friendly name, and gave her three choices: Pebbles, Gypsy, or Asia. She chose Pebbles because, at the time, R&B singer "Pebbles" Reid was popular for the song "Mercedes Boy". "It kind of had a buzz around the name, which is good," Pebbles told the Boston Globe in 2006.

== Achievements ==
"The Ramiro & Pebbles Morning Show" was awarded Best Morning Show by Cityvoter.com in January 2011.

Pebbles reported from the 1998 Winter Olympics in Nagano, Japan.
