= FNX =

FNX may refer to:

- First Nations Experience (FNX), a non-profit television network in San Bernardino, California
- FN FNX, a model of autoloading semi-automatic pistol available in various calibers
- Quadra FNX Mining, a mining company based out of Toronto

== See also ==
- WFNX (disambiguation), a call sign that has been held by several radio stations in the United States
