= WZLX =

Classic rock radio station in Boston

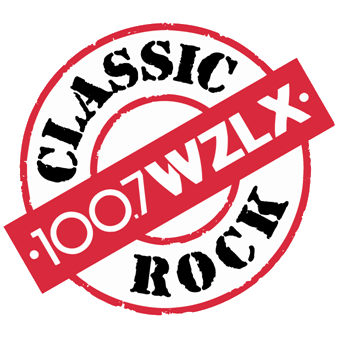
- Boston, Massachusetts; United States
- Broadcast area: Greater Boston
- Frequency: 100.7 MHz (HD Radio)
- Branding: 100.7 WZLX

Programming
- Format: Classic rock
- Subchannels: HD2: Simulcast of WRKO (talk); HD3: Simulcast of WXKS (talk)
- Affiliations: Premiere Networks

Ownership
- Owner: iHeartMedia; (iHM Licenses, LLC)
- Sister stations: WBWL; WBZ; WJMN; WRKO; WXKS; WXKS-FM; WZRM

History
- First air date: October 1948
- Former call signs: WCOP-FM (1948–1976); WTTK (1976–1978); WHUE-FM (1979–1984); WCOZ (1984–1985); WKKT (1985)

Technical information
- Licensing authority: FCC
- Facility ID: 13806
- Class: B
- ERP: 21,500 watts
- HAAT: 235 meters (771 ft)
- Transmitter coordinates: 42°20′50.3″N 71°4′57.1″W

Links
- Public license information: Public file; LMS
- Webcast: Listen live (via iHeartRadio)
- Website: wzlx.iheart.com

WZLX (100.7 FM) is a classic rock radio station in Boston, Massachusetts. This station is owned and operated by iHeartMedia. WZLX was one of America's first classic rock FM stations. Its studios are in Medford, and its transmitter is atop the Prudential Tower.

== History ==
WZLX originally known as WCOP-FM is notable for being one of the first FM stations to break simulcasting with its AM partner. WCOP-FM's separate programming was initially classical music and was one of the first FM stations in the region to (briefly) broadcast in FM stereo (the station would resume stereo programming in the early 1970s).

In 1965, WCOP (AM) had become Boston's affiliate for the NBC Radio Network, and WCOP-FM would often simulcast the hourly NBC Radio newscasts. By 1969, NBC Radio's weekend series Monitor had moved from WCOP to WCOP-FM, to allow the former to broadcast more hours of country music on the weekends.

WCOP-FM went through a number of format and callsign changes, including beautiful music in the late 1960s until 1973, oldies (as "Total Gold 101, WCOP-FM") from 1973 to 1974, country from 1974 to October 1976, "progressive country" (as WTTK, "TK101") from October 1976 to December 1978, beautiful music (as WHUE-FM) from January 1979 to January 1985, and top 40 (as WKKT, "The Cat") for a few months, beginning in February 1985. In December 1984, while still a beautiful music station, WHUE-FM sought and received the WCOZ call letters formerly on 94.5; the call sign was only used for two weeks prior to becoming WKKT.

The station adopted its current format and callsign, WZLX, in mid-October 1985. At the suggestion of Dan Mason, VP of the station's owner, First Media Corporation, and station manager David Meszaros, the company hired Gary Guthrie as the architect of its classic hits format, a format aimed at people who experienced adolescence in either the 1960s and 1970s and enjoyed the music of those eras, but did not care for the then-current heavy metal or top 40 'hot hits' of the 1980s. These were people whose mindset was getting too old for AOR and top 40, but were too young for or not interested in oldies. WZLX is considered one of the classic rock format's earliest success stories as reflected by the station's 19th to 2nd place climb in the Adults 25-54 demographic in its first ratings period.

In 1986, Guthrie spread his concept of the format to other radio stations he consulted, and Bill Smith was hired to be the station's program director and morning personality. Guthrie would return in 1990 for an additional on-site stint to repair the station's ratings.

A series of ownership changes made WZLX a part of Cook Inlet Radio Partners, then Infinity Broadcasting in late 1992. Infinity was renamed CBS Radio in December 2005.

In 1997, WZLX radio host George Taylor Morris created a media frenzy about the "Dark Side of the Rainbow" phenomenon, in which Pink Floyd's album The Dark Side of the Moon is said to synch up with the movie The Wizard of Oz.

In 2005, WZLX, along with sister stations WBMX and WODS, were rumored to flip to CBS Radio's ever-expanding "Jack FM" format. Had WQSX (now WEEI-FM) not flipped to the format as "93.7 Mike FM" on April 14, WZLX might have flipped to the format the next day as 100.7 Jack FM.

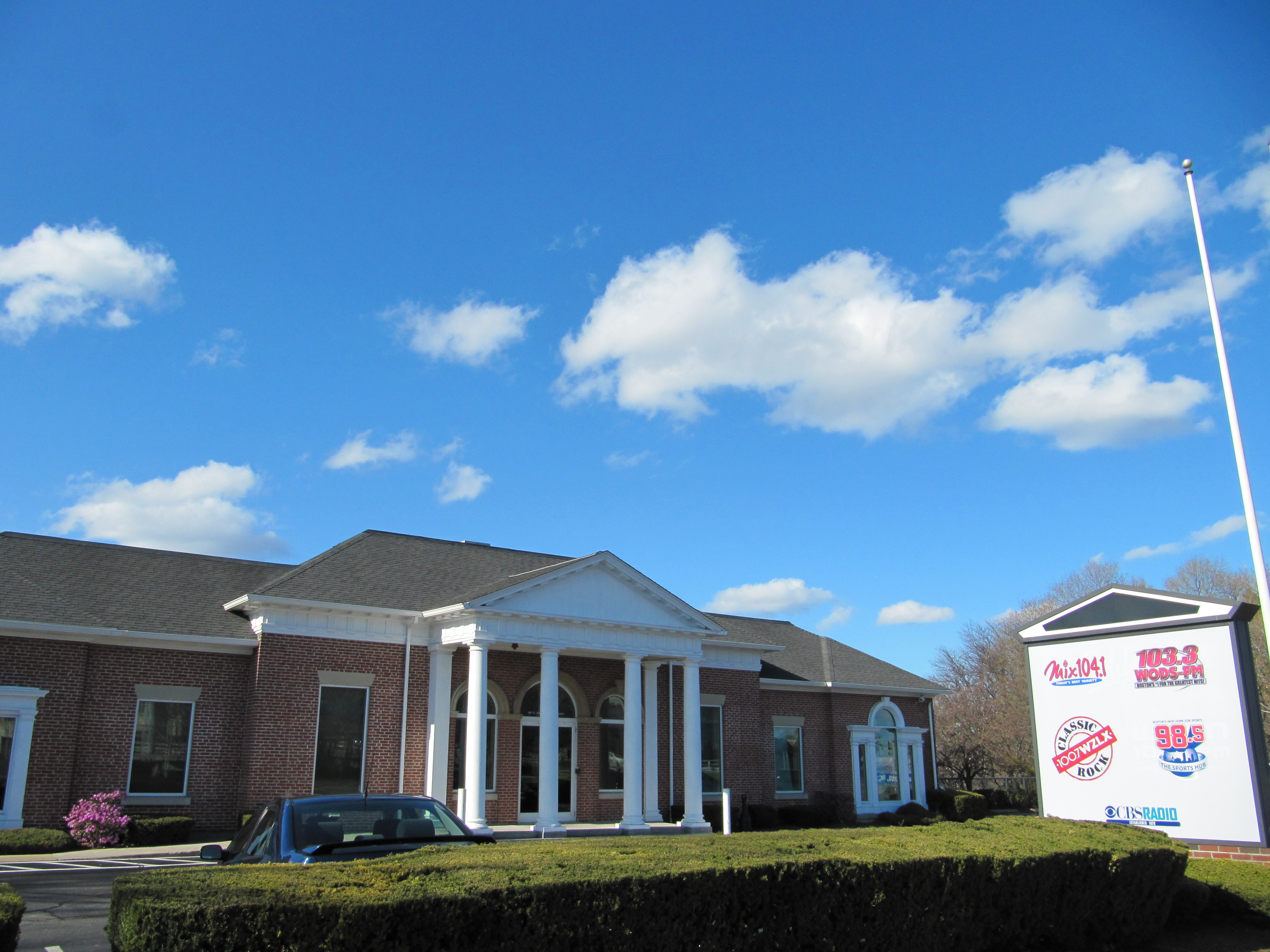
CBS Boston studios, home of WZLX from 2007 until 2018

From 1991 to 2007, the station had its studios on the 24th floor of the Prudential Tower in downtown Boston, the location of its transmitter. On March 3, 2007, the station moved crosstown to the facility where sister stations WODS and WBCN were clustered in the CBS studios in Brighton. The antenna is still atop the Prudential Tower.

In the spring of 2007, WZLX became the very first FM station in the country to broadcast programming in full digital 5.1 stereo surround sound. This flagship effort coincides with the recent move of the industry to implement the HD Radio format.

On February 2, 2017, CBS Radio announced it would merge with Entercom (which locally owned WEEI, WEEI-FM, WKAF, WRKO and WAAF). On October 10, CBS Radio announced that as part of the process of obtaining regulatory approval of the merger, WZLX would be one of sixteen stations that would be divested by Entercom, along with sister stations WBZ and WBZ-FM, as well as WRKO and WKAF (WBMX, WODS, WEEI AM and FM, and WAAF would be retained by Entercom, while WBZ-FM was traded to Beasley Broadcast Group in exchange for WMJX). On November 1, iHeartMedia announced that they would acquire WZLX, WBZ (AM), WRKO, and WKAF. To meet ownership limits set by the FCC, iHeart placed WKOX into the Ocean Stations Trust in preparation for a sale to a permanent buyer. The merger was approved on November 9, 2017, and was consummated on November 17. iHeart then began operating WZLX, WBZ, and WKAF under a local marketing agreement. The sale of WZLX, WRKO, WKAF, and WBZ to iHeart was completed on December 19, 2017.

== Programming/personalities ==
As of July 2026, WZLX's daily on-air lineup features Carter Alan in middays, Kenny Young in afternoon drive, and Corey Rotic (voice-tracked from WMMS in Cleveland) in evenings.

Morning drive is helmed by longtime disc jockey Chuck Nowlin. Debuting in 2025, "The Chuck Nowlin Morning Show" is an interactive, music-intensive program featuring former WAAF and WEEI personality Danielle Murr, WZLX program director Chris Tyler, and producers Mike Pelosi and Jack Gill. Nowlin previously hosted afternoons at WZLX since 1991, having previously worked at WAAF throughout the 1980s.

Weekends feature Rob Anthony of WMMS, Doug Palmieri of WHJY in Providence, Rhode Island, and "The Rock Revolution" with Mike Pelosi. Syndicated programming includes Live in Concert, Sammy Hagar's Top Rock Countdown, and Carol Miller's Get the Led Out.

There have been several prominent morning shows throughout the station's history:

- With the coming of Howard Stern to sister-station WBCN in 1996, Charles Laquidara and his show, The Big Mattress, took up residence at WZLX.
- Upon Laquidara's retirement in 2000, former WFNX personality "Morning Guy Tai" Irwin and comedian Steve Sweeney launched Mornings with Tai and Steve Sweeney. Following Tai's departure early in its run, the show was renamed to Steve Sweeney's Neighborhood with co-host Lance Norris, which ended in 2005.
- Former Van Halen singer David Lee Roth hosted mornings on WZLX during a 2-week "audition" in 2005. Roth would later, briefly take over for Howard Stern on several East Coast stations including WBCN, following Stern's move to SiriusXM satellite radio in 2006.
- Longtime morning team Karlson and McKenzie assumed morning drive duties on August 1, 2005, with Kevin Karlson, Pete McKenzie, and Heather Ford transferring from WPDH in Poughkeepsie, New York. The show's run, by then known as Karlson, McKenzie, and Heather, ended due to the sudden death of Karlson in October 2023. McKenzie and Ford continued hosting Boston's Only Classic Rock Morning Show with producer Kenny Young through early 2024.
- On May 20, 2024, The Rich Shertenlieb Show premiered, a sports-centric show featuring former New England Patriots linebacker Ted Johnson, journalists Michael Hurley and Emerson Lotzia, and producer Kenny Young. Shertenlieb co-hosted the Toucher & Rich show on both WBCN and WBZ-FM from 2006 until 2023. As a result of low ratings, conflicts in the direction of the show, and corporate-wide budget cuts at iHeartMedia, Shertenlieb's program was canceled on November 4, 2024, after less than six months on the air.

Barry Scott and The Lost 45s was a long-running program on Sunday nights. Scott previously served as WZLX's marketing and promotions director from the station's inception until 1992.

=== Sports conflict broadcasts ===
At the beginning of October 2013, WZLX carried Boston Celtics games that conflicted with Boston Bruins games. Games were produced by sister station WBZ-FM (which is the flagship for both teams). In addition, some Bruins games conflicting with WBZ-FM's New England Patriots broadcasts aired on WZLX starting in 2011 (previously, WBZ served this function). Celtics and Bruins broadcasts were dropped from WZLX following the sale to iHeartMedia, which separated the station from WBZ-FM (now owned by the Beasley Broadcast Group). As of April 2020, conflicting Bruins games had moved WBOS, while conflicting Celtics games moved to WROR-FM.

=== WZLX HD2 ===
WZLX previously aired an all-blues format on its HD2 subchannel called "Radio Mojo". On December 19, 2017, WZLX-HD2 began simulcasting sister talk radio station WRKO.

=== WZLX HD3 ===
WZLX previously aired a freeform rock format on its HD3 subchannel called "WBCN" which continued the name of the former Boston AOR station. On January 29, 2016, WZLX-HD3 switched to an adult standards format as "The Lounge". After the sale of the station to iHeart was completed on December 19, 2017, the HD3 channel was removed. In early March 2020, the HD3 channel was reopened and started carrying the K-Love network under a lease agreement with EMF Broadcasting. In 2021, the lease ended, and the HD3 programming was changed to a simulcast of another sister talk radio station, WXKS.
