= Prudential Tower =

Office building in Boston, Massachusetts

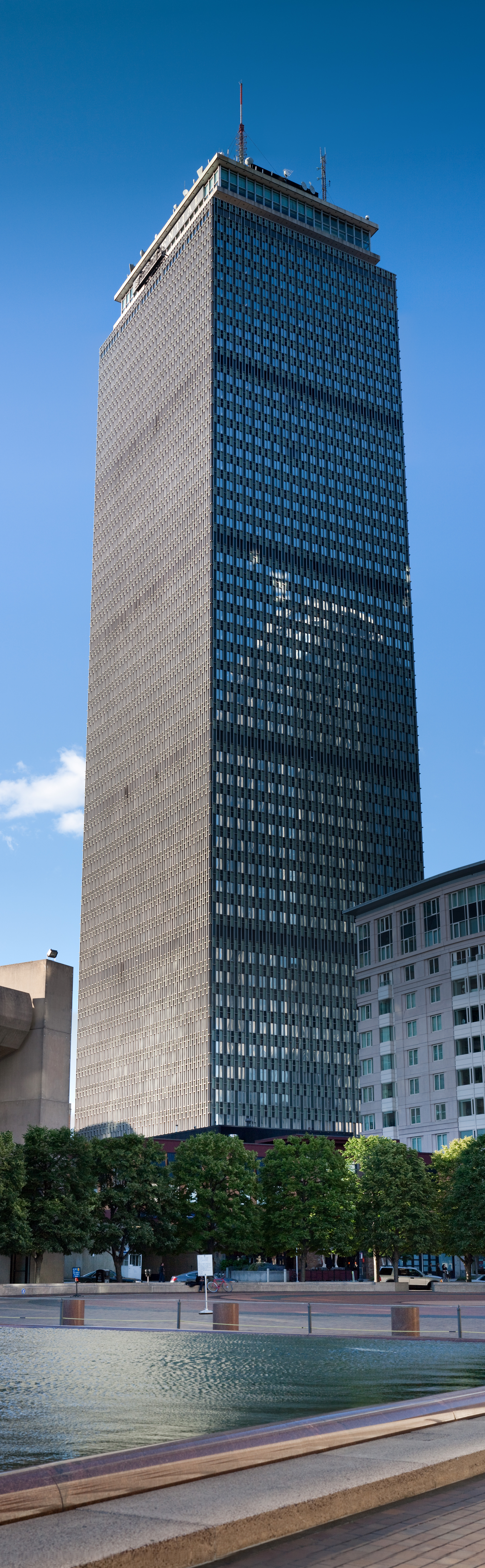
- Vertical panoramic view of the Prudential Tower

Record height
- Tallest in Boston from 1964 to 1976^{[I]}
- Preceded by: Custom House Tower
- Surpassed by: John Hancock Tower

General information
- Type: Office, Observation, Restaurant, Retail
- Location: 800 Boylston Street; Boston, Massachusetts; 02199
- Coordinates: 42°20′49.78″N 71°04′57.08″W
- Construction started: 1960
- Completed: 1964

Height
- Antenna spire: 907 feet (276 m)
- Roof: 749 feet (228 m)

Technical details
- Floor count: 52
- Floor area: 1.2 million square feet (111,484 m^{2})

Design and construction
- Architect: The Luckman Partnership
- Developer: Boston Properties

Website
- www.prudentialcenter.com

The Prudential Tower (also known as the Prudential Building or, colloquially, the Pru) is an international style skyscraper in Boston, Massachusetts. The building, a part of the Prudential Center complex, currently stands as the 2nd-tallest building in Boston in surface/roof height, behind the John Hancock Tower. The Prudential Tower was designed by Charles Luckman and Associates for Prudential Insurance. Completed in 1964, the building is 749 feet (228 m) tall, with 52 floors (surface/roof height), and as of January 2021, is tied with others as the 114th-tallest in the United States. It contains 1.2 million sq ft (110,000 m^{2}) of commercial and retail space. Including its radio mast, the tower's pinnacle height reaches 907 feet (276 m).

== History ==
The Prudential Tower began construction in 1960 with steel erection work by Donovan Steel. During its construction in December 1963, poet Arthur Crew Inman committed suicide due to the sound of construction outside his apartment. This unveiled what was then believed to be the longest diary ever composed by an American. Upon its completion in 1964, the Prudential was the tenth tallest building in the world and the tallest building in North America outside of New York City, surpassing the Terminal Tower in Cleveland, Ohio. It also ended the Custom House Tower's 59-year reign as the tallest building in Boston, and passed Hartford's Travelers Tower as the tallest building in New England.

The newly built Prudential Tower dwarfed John Hancock Financial's headquarters building, built in 1947. This spurred the insurance rival to build the 1975 John Hancock Tower, which is slightly taller at 790 feet (240 m).

Today, the Prudential is no longer among the fifty tallest buildings in the U.S. in architectural height, but at 907 feet (276 m), it still stands in that rank based on pinnacle height. Within Boston, in addition to the nearby John Hancock tower, several other tall buildings have since been built such as the Four Seasons Hotel & Private Residences (One Dalton Street) at 742 feet (226 m), and the Millennium Tower in the Downtown Crossing neighborhood at 685 feet (209 m). The financial district includes the 614-foot (187 m) Federal Reserve Bank, now the 5th tallest. As of 2025, the Prudential, John Hancock, and the Four Seasons towers dominate the Back Bay skyline.

== Critical reception ==
When it was built, the Prudential Tower received mostly positive architectural reviews. The New York Times called it "the showcase of the New Boston [representing] the agony and the ecstasy of a city striving to rise above the sordidness of its recent past".

But Ada Louise Huxtable called it "a flashy 52-story glass and aluminum tower ... part of an over-scaled megalomaniac group shockingly unrelated to the city's size, standards, or style. It is a slick developer's model dropped into an urban renewal slot in Anycity, U.S.A.—a textbook example of urban character assassination." Architect Donlyn Lyndon called it "an energetically ugly, square shaft that offends the Boston skyline more than any other structure". In 1990, Boston Globe architecture critic Robert Campbell commented: "The Prudential Center has been the symbol of bad design in Boston for so long that we'd probably miss it if it disappeared."

== Ownership ==
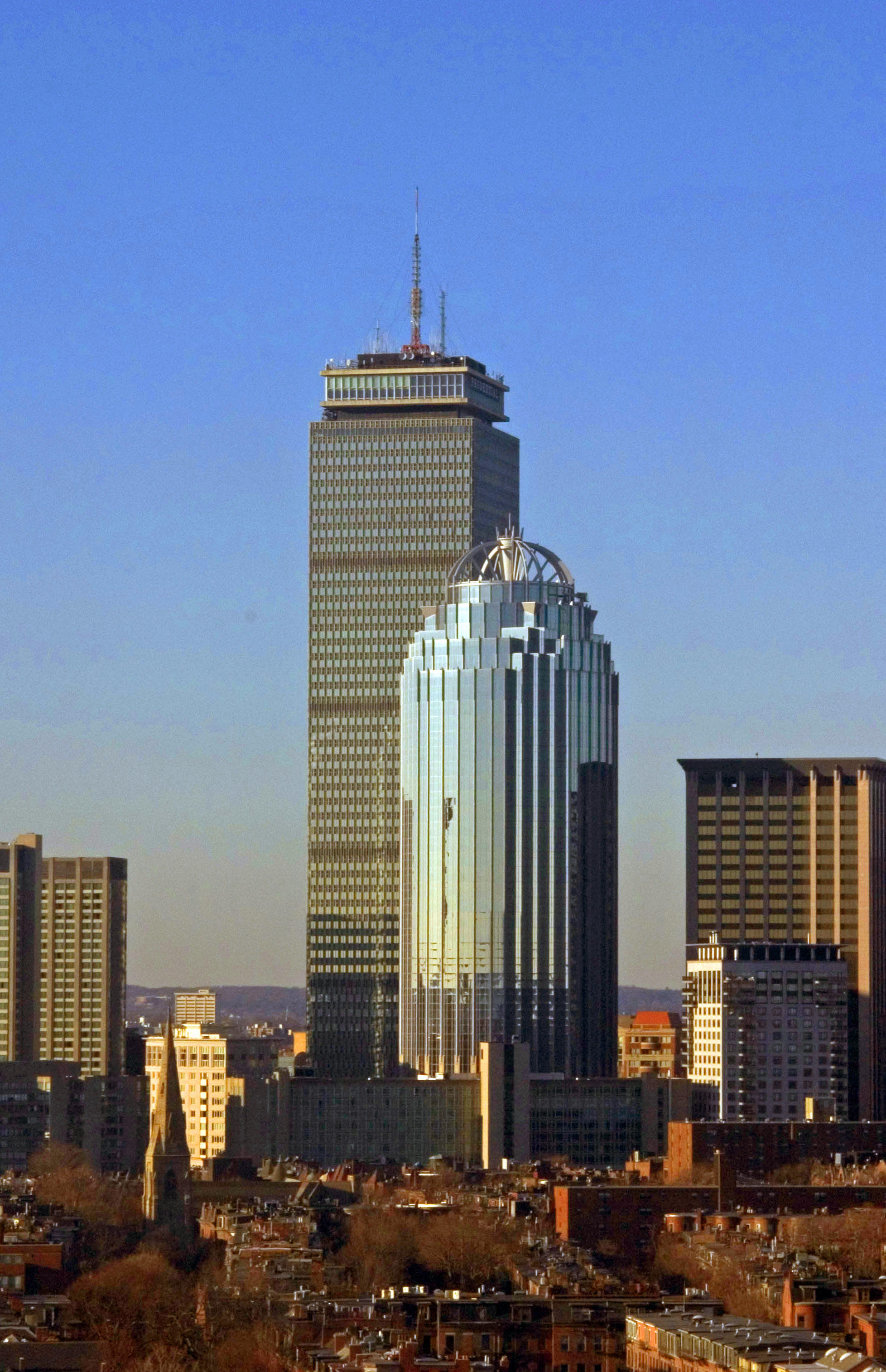
The Prudential Tower behind 111 Huntington Avenue, as seen from the South End

The Prudential Center is currently owned by Boston Properties. The building is one of several Prudential Centers built around the United States (such as the tower in Chicago) constructed as capital investments by Prudential Financial (formerly, The Prudential Insurance Company of America). Preceding Prudential Financial's demutualization, Prudential sold many of its real estate assets, for instance most of the air rights in Times Square (New York City), and the Prudential Center in Boston, to put cash on the corporate balance sheets.

The Gillette Company, now a unit of Procter & Gamble, once occupied 40 percent of the space in the structure but has since vacated many of these floors. Boston-based law firm Ropes & Gray moved into much of this space, including the 37th through 49th, in fall 2010. Other major tenants include Wall Street investment firm Home State Corporation, Partners HealthCare, Club Monaco, Exeter Group, and Accenture. Boston Properties acquired the building in 1998.

However, Prudential Financial's then head of global marketing, and Boston native, Michael Hines, suggested that the real estate deal only go through with the condition that Prudential retain the name and signage rights for the Prudential Center and Prudential Tower. Signage rights in Boston are very limited, and Prudential's are grandfathered. The other notable backlit signs allowed above 100 feet (30 m) include The Colonnade Hotel, Boston, State Street Bank sign, Sheraton sign, and the Boston Citgo sign. Using similar negotiations, Prudential retains two notable signs in Times Square.

== Features and design ==
=== Lighting ===
The tradition of using the window lights to support local sports teams and events began at its inception in 1964 supporting the charity drive for the United Fund, a predecessor of the United Way. The building's windows have been illuminated with "GO B's" to support the Boston Bruins during the Stanley Cup playoffs and "GO SOX" or a "1" during important World Series and postseason games.

In the 1999, 2003, 2004, 2007, 2013 and 2018 Major League Baseball playoffs, the building's tenants turned on and off their lights to spell out "GO SOX", providing a visual for Boston Red Sox fans nearby and at Fenway Park. The tower appears in nearly all pictures of deep right field from the left field line, and is prominently featured in most broadcasts from the park.

A normal display of 91 foot tall letters takes over 140 man-hours, covers 18 floors of the building, uses 165 additional window lights, and 260 window block out panels.

On April 22, 2013, the City of Boston requested the lighting of the Prudential Tower with the number "1" in support of The One Fund Boston and those affected by the Boston Marathon bombing. The display was seen on the north side of the building, overlooking Boylston Street, where the tragedy occurred just a week earlier.

Over the past few years, the Prudential Tower has been illuminated through light-emitting diodes (LEDs), that have the capacity to create a glow near the top of the building. The lighting is used for special occasions and charitable events and can support nearly every color, including pink, maroon, red, orange, yellow, gold, green, blue, and purple.

=== Prudential Center ===
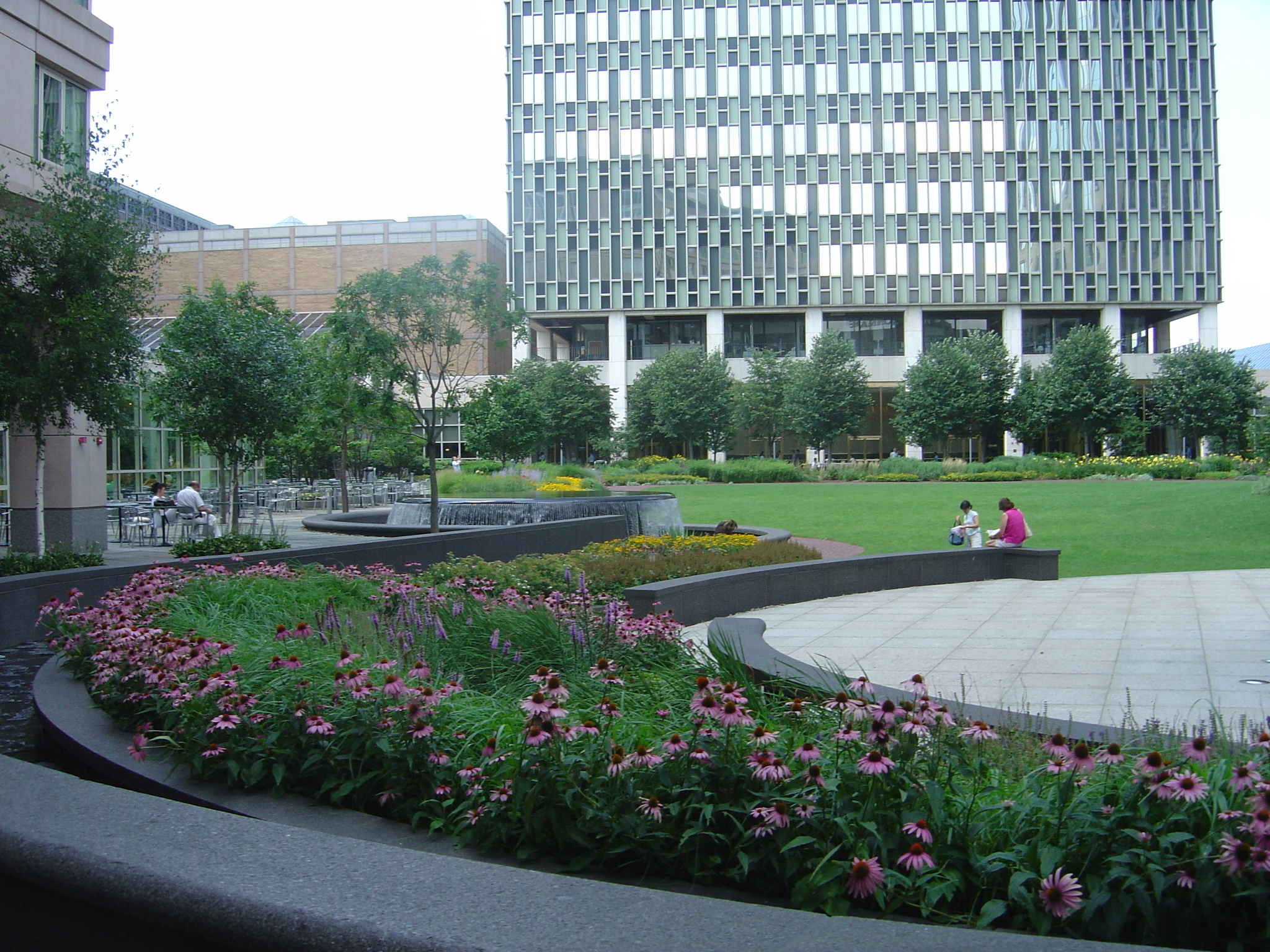
Prudential Center courtyard, July 2006

The Prudential Center, situated on 23 acres (93,000 m^{2}), is in the Back Bay neighborhood at 800 Boylston Street and houses the 620,000-square-foot (58,000 m^{2}) Prudential Center shopping mall in the base. Known to locals as "the Pru," it is bordered by Belvidere, Dalton, Boylston, and Exeter streets overlooking Huntington Avenue. Before the Prudential development, the site was a switch yard for the Boston and Albany Railroad. By 1965, a part of the negotiations for the Massachusetts Turnpike extension included the construction of the roadway below parts of the Prudential complex. The Prudential still has its own (eastbound only) exit from the turnpike for this reason.

The new skyscraper at 111 Huntington Avenue was completed in 2002, directly across the street from The Colonnade Hotel, at 120 Huntington Avenue. The third tower of the Prudential Center, 101 Huntington Avenue, is, at a mere 25 stories, overshadowed by the other two.

The Hynes Convention Center is connected to the complex, as well as the existing Sheraton Hotel Boston at Copley Place, which combined was considered the first mixed-use development in New England and awarded the Urban Land Institute's Best Mixed Use Development Award in 2006. By the fall of 2007, another major development was completed along Boylston Street at the Prudential Center complex: the Mandarin Oriental, Boston hotel. In 2016, 888 Boylston Street, a 17-story LEED Platinum-certified office building, completed the last site of the Prudential Center complex.

The complex has direct indoor connections to two MBTA stops, Prudential and Back Bay. Prudential is on the Huntington Avenue side of the building directly outside the Colonnade Hotel and is the first station on the Green Line E branch after its split from the main line at Copley Square. Back Bay is a stop on the Orange Line and is connected to the Pru complex via a pedestrian tunnel to the Copley Place mall, which in turn is attached by an elevated walkway over Huntington Avenue. Back Bay station is also served by Amtrak, including the Acela high-speed train.

The Prudential Center serves as one of three starting locales for the Boston Duck Tours, a popular tourist attraction in the city.

In November 2016, a 45,000-square-foot (4,200 m^{2}) Eataly restaurant and food store was opened, replacing the existing food court.

== Observation deck and restaurant ==
The 50th-floor observation deck known as the Skywalk Observatory was for many years the highest publicly accessible viewpoint in New England, since the higher deck atop the John Hancock Tower had closed after the September 11 attacks in 2001.

The Skywalk and the 52nd-floor restaurant Top of the Hub—which had operated since December 1965—were both scheduled to close permanently on April 18, 2020, but ended operations earlier that March due to the COVID-19 pandemic in the United States.

Top of the Hub was operated by the Stouffer Corporation and later by Select Restaurants Inc., which managed several other "Top of" locations across the United States. Known for live jazz, seafood towers, and panoramic city views, the restaurant became a popular venue for special occasions.

In June 2023, the top three floors of the Prudential Tower reopened as View Boston, a 59,000-square-foot (5,500 m^{2}) attraction that includes an enclosed observation deck and gift shop on the 52nd floor; an indoor–outdoor bar called Stratus and wrap-around terrace on the 51st floor; and a bistro called The Beacon on the 50th floor.

== Antenna and broadcast tenants ==
The main rooftop mast supports two FM master antennas, and a top-mounted television antenna previously used by WBPX. The upper master antenna, manufactured by Electronics Research, Inc. (ERI), serves WZLX 100.7, WWBX 104.1, WMJX 106.7, and WXKS-FM 107.9. The lower master antenna was installed in the late 1990s, also by ERI, and serves WBOS 92.9, WBQT 96.9, and WROR-FM 105.7. The FM stations each transmit with approximately 22,000 watts ERP and in HD Radio. The roof also has a smaller tower with standby antennas for WZLX, WWBX, WROR-FM, WXKS-FM. All 7 FM broadcast tenants have backups located in Newton as well.

The studios of FM station WBCN occupied space on the 50th floor for a period in the 1970s and WEEI (AM 590 and FM 103.3), when it was CBS Radio owned and operated, had its offices and studios on the 44th floor in the second half of the 1960s.

== List of tenants ==
Notable tenants of the Prudential Center include:

- Accenture
- Advent International
- Boston Properties
- Eversource Energy
- Federal Home Loan Banks
- Gordon Brothers
- MFS Investment Management
- Partners HealthCare
- Regus
- Robins Kaplan LLP
- Ropes & Gray
- SAS
- Savills
- Simpson Gumpertz & Heger Inc.
- Wayfair
- Willis Towers Watson

== See also ==
- Prudential Center
- List of tallest buildings in Boston

Preceded by Custom House Tower	Tallest Building in Boston; 1964–1976; 228 m	Succeeded by John Hancock Tower
Preceded by Terminal Tower	Tallest building in the United States outside of New York City; 1964–1969; 228 m	Succeeded by John Hancock Center
