= WFNX =

WFNX may refer to:

- WFNX (LP), a non-commercial, Low Power FM station (101.3 FM), licensed to Scituate Community Radio, Inc.
- WFNX (FM), a defunct radio station (95.3 FM) formerly licensed to serve Grand Marais, Minnesota, United States
- WKMY (FM), a radio station (99.9 FM) in Athol, Massachusetts that held the call sign WFNX from 2013 to 2020
- WBWL (FM), a radio station (101.7 FM) in Boston, Massachusetts, which held the call sign WFNX from 1983 to 2012
