= Five All Night, Live All Night =

Five All Night, Live All Night was a locally produced late-night TV show on Boston station WCVB-TV, channel 5 that aired from March 5, 1980 to December 12, 1982. It was part of a late night block of programming called Five All Night that went on the air in 1972. Locally owned at that time, WCVB was one of the first stations in the country to start broadcasting 24-hours a day.

== Beginnings ==
Five All Night, Live All Night was first produced by WBCN-FM "News Dissector" Danny Schechter. Steve Schlow was the executive producer and the associate producer was Vicki Gordon. WCVB auditioned about fifty candidates to host the show. Schlow chose Boston radio personality Matt Siegel to host the show, as he was impressed by his dating advice segment and his interview with Boston Globe sportswriter Peter Gammons.

The program began at 2:15 a.m, following Tomorrow, and ran for approximately two hours. When the station became an ABC affiliate, it aired at 1:30 am following Nightline.

Five All Night, Live All Night first aired on March 5, 1980. During the program's first week, its guests included Bill Lee, Taj Mahal, Allen Ginsberg, Timothy Leary, and Tony Cennamo.

== Issues ==
Five All Night, Live All Night had a budget of about $400 per show. It had only one camera and microphone weekdays and two cameras and three microphones on Saturdays. It had no prop budget, which resulted in crew members furnishing the set, which was made to look like an apartment, with items from home. Advertising spots on the program cost $50 (compared to $3,000 to $5,000 for prime time spots).

The early shows were plagued with technical difficulties, including problems transferring phone calls and the loss of audio or video. A few weeks into the show's run, Boston band Human Sexual Response performed their song "Butt Fuck" accompanied by a nude female dancer. The song aired uncensored, due to the fact that the director was preoccupied with the presence of the nude woman, and the station received some complaints the next day. During an appearance by Wendy O. Williams, Williams removed her halter top and bared her breasts.

== Format ==
Five All Night, Live All Night featured interviews guests, live music, and telephone calls. It had a studio audience on Fridays and Saturdays. During Siegel's tenure as host, its running segments included "Dr. Matt's Advice to the Lovelorn," "Insomniacs Alliance", "Let's Talk Security" (for night security guards), and "The Groovy Movie". Although the show was called Five All Night, Live All Night, it was often prerecorded.

== Departure of Schechter and Siegel and cancellation ==
Schechter was fired by the station on June 13, 1980, due to "irreversible philosophical differences" over the show's content. Schechter wanted to target Boston's young, college-aged, rock-and-roll audience while the station wanted to go after a broader audience. He was succeeded by Kevin Dawkins. In December 1980, Siegel left the program after he took a job at WXKS-FM. He was replaced on a temporary basis by the show's announcer, Nancy Villone and then by Dan Kain. The show was canceled by WCVB on December 12, 1982.

== Guests ==
During the show's run, its guests included Dr. Henry Heimlich (inventor of the Heimlich maneuver), Howard Zinn (who promoted his book A People's History of the United States), Robert Rimmer (on a program about alternative marital arrangements), Allen Ginsberg, Timothy Leary, David Brenner, Abbie Hoffman, Illinois Jacquet, Art Blakey, Tom Snyder, Bill Lee, Dennis Eckersley, Dave Cowens, Marvin Hagler, Erica Jong, William Shatner, Tom Davis, Al Franken, Bill Murray, John Ehrlichman, Elaine Noble, Dapper O'Neil, The Cars, Iggy Pop, Bob Marley, Taj Mahal, Arlo Guthrie, Richie Stotts, and Wendy O. Williams.
