= Turn (The Wombats song) =

2017 song by English band, The Wombats

Single by The Wombats

from the album Beautiful People Will Ruin Your Life
- Released: 6 December 2017
- Length: 3:28
- Label: 14th Floor; Bright Antenna

The Wombats singles chronology
"Lemon to a Knife Fight" (2017)	"Turn" (2017)	"Cheetah Tongue" (2018)

Music video
- "Turn" on YouTube

"Turn" is a song by English indie rock band, The Wombats. It was first released as a single from their fourth studio album, Beautiful People Will Ruin Your Life, on 6 December 2017. It followed the release of the album's lead single, "Lemon to a Knife Fight". The song was well received, and charted on the US Alternative Songs chart. With the album collectively, the song achieved high levels of success for the band.

== Background and release ==
"Turn" is the third track on The Wombats' fourth studio album, Beautiful People Will Ruin Your Life. The fourth album is more experimental in their sound, departing from a classic punk-rock sound. Frontman of The Wombats, Matthew Murphy, said that he was pushing for the album to be more "organic and less synth driven", and thus, "Turn" was a mistake that pushed the album into a new direction. The song was written while the band was in New York, and it is about the irritabilities and quirks that one experiences in a relationship, as evidenced by the lyrics, "Maybe it's the crazy I'd miss, maybe it's the bullshit I'd miss".

The song was first released as the second promotional single from the album in late 2017, and then with the album in February 2018. Following that, it was also released as a collaboration with Dagny, and then as a remix with Ayokay. In 2018, it was also released as a Spotify single, alongside a cover of "Los Ageless", originally sung by artist St. Vincent. The song was also released on vinyl and CD, alongside download and streaming on music streaming platforms such as Spotify and Apple Music.

== Influence and style ==
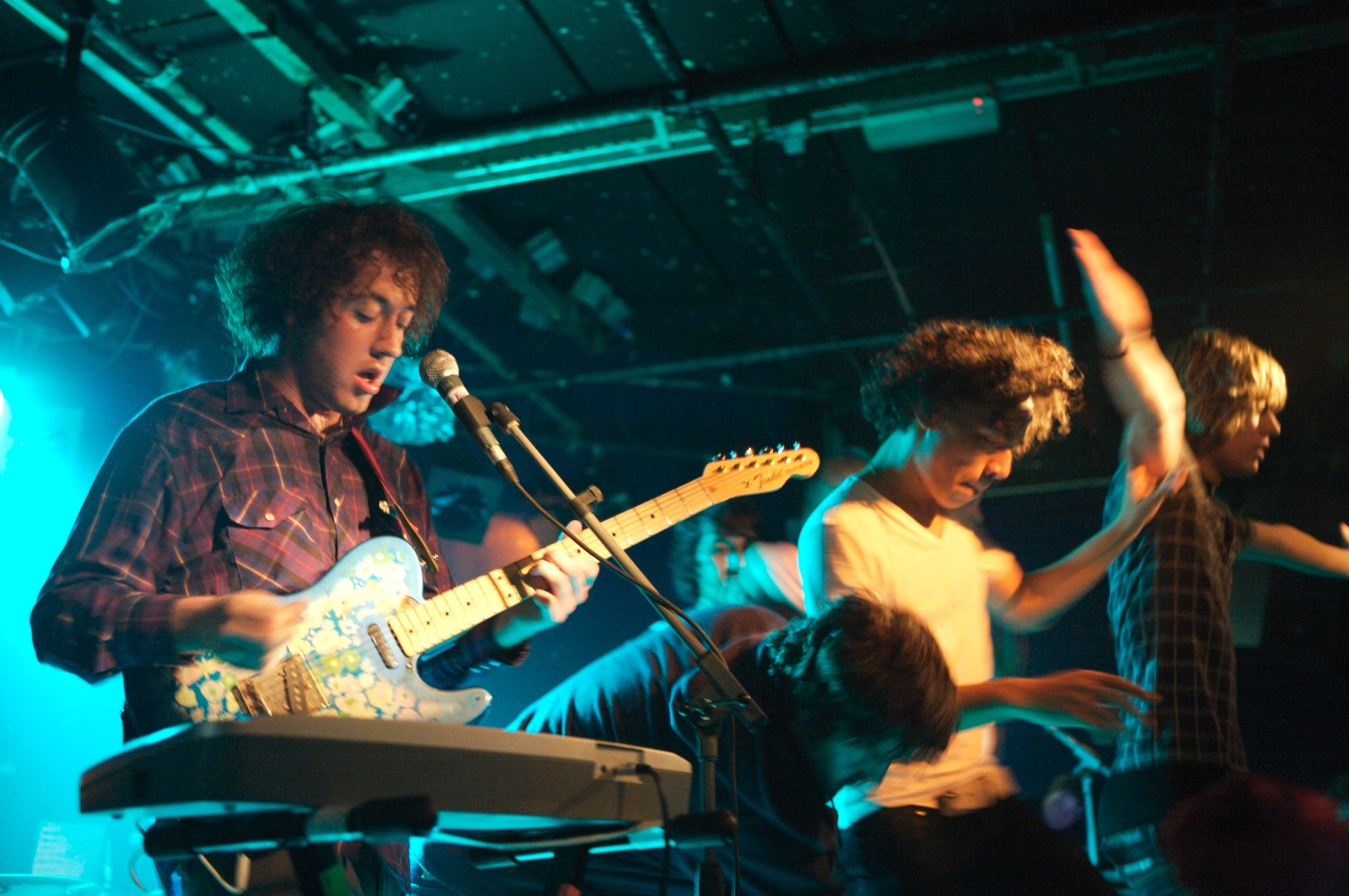
The Wombats

The song, and album as a whole, features a more laid-back tone, as opposed to their other albums. It features a slow beat, with a heavy emphasis on guitar sounds, and as the lead singer, Matthew Murphy describes it, “probably the most electronic song on the album”. It is also a departing from Matthew Murphy’s usual singing tone, switching instead to more higher pitched riffs. The song also references Canadian rapper, Drake, with the lyrics:

"They say the best memories are the ones that we forget /like listening to Drake at your best friend's swimming pool/Floating anti-clockwise in a red mushroom."

Matthew Murphy said the name-drop was "autobiographical", stating that he and his wife were listening to Drake and that there was “a lot of imagery from that day which felt good to use for the song." Murphy also added: "I knew when I was writing it that there was something kind of special, that I needed to relax and not try to rush it, which I kind of normally do with a lot songs I get excited about. So I was just like, okay this feels great let's chill out and let's not freak out and we'll slowly pick away at it for a couple of weeks and then yeah that's what happened." He described it as a “beautiful mistake".

== Critical reception ==
The song was well received, both as a single and in relation to its corresponding album. Wall of Sound called it "one of the highlights of the record." Atwood Magazine said it was the "cornerstone of their music", "a chilling vibrant track that encompasses the indecision of a relationship", with "inspired lyrics, strong vocals and understated production." Rolling Stone called it a "gentler, lovelorn ballad, boosted by acoustic strumming and flashes of falsetto from Matthew Murphy." The Edge UK described the song as being on another level, stating that it "reintroduced fans to the band's immersive post-punk guitar and electronic-inspired pop beat. Amnplify wrote that the song "pushes boundaries with of alt-pop innovation with a lush, ultramodern indie soundscape, irrepressible hooks and tragic-comic lyricism belied by a newfound maturity and emotional moving depth." In mid April 2018, the song was listed as Annie Mac's Hottest Record on BBC Radio 1. It was also featured as the 'Song of the Week' for RadioBDC, Boston for the first week of 2018.

== Chart performance ==
"Turn" peaked at number 36 on the US Alternative Songs chart in April 2018. It was their fourth entry on the chart, alongside "Jump into the Fog", which peaked at number 16 in 2011, "Give Me a Try", which peaked at number 19 in 2015, and "Greek Tragedy", which peaked at number 32, also in 2015.

=== Weekly charts ===
Chart (2018)	Peak position
UK Indie (OCC)	20
US Alternative Airplay (Billboard)	36

== Certifications ==
Region	Certification	Certified units/sales
United Kingdom (BPI)	Gold	400,000^{‡}
^{‡} Sales+streaming figures based on certification alone.

== Music video ==
The music video for "Turn" was released on 14 April 2018, directed by Brother Willis, who has also directed music videos for artists such as King Krule, Beirut and Fickle Friends. It features the three band members, with Matthew Murphy headlining, accompanied by spinning visuals, such as disembodied brains, and absurd situations. Willis said of the video, "There's something about the pace of the song (coupled with the title of course) that suggested a constantly spinning visual to me. The lyrics so visually depict specific memories that it seemed like a logical way to show memories floating around inside Murphy's head."

== Live performances ==
The Wombats performed "Turn" during an intimate session in the Sound Lounge at 101WKQX in early February 2018. They also performed it at Paste Studios in New York City in early October 2018, as well as on the JBTV Music Television stage in late September 2018. In February 2018, they performed an acoustic rendition of the song for Rolling Stone. They also performed the song on the morning Zoe Ball Show in 2018.

== Credits and personnel ==
The song was produced by Catherine Marks (who has produced work with other bands such as Wolf Alice, The Killers and Foals), Mark Crew (who has produced work with Bastille), and Marius D. Hagen.

- Matthew Murphy – lead vocals, guitars, keyboards, production
- Dan Haggis – drums, percussion, keyboards, guitars, backing vocals
- Tord Øverland Knudsen – bass guitar, keyboards, backing vocals, production
