= Lemon to a Knife Fight =

2017 single by the Wombats

Single by the Wombats

from the album Beautiful People Will Ruin Your Life
- Released: 7 November 2017
- Recorded: 2017
- Genre: Indie rock; alternative; post-punk
- Length: 3:26
- Label: 14th Floor (UK); Bright Antenna (US)
- Songwriters: Matthew Murphy; Matt Rad

The Wombats singles chronology
"Emoticons" (2015)	"Lemon to a Knife Fight" (2017)	"Turn" (2017)

"Lemon to a Knife Fight" is a song by English rock band the Wombats. It was released as the lead single from the band's fourth album, Beautiful People Will Ruin Your Life, on 7 November 2017. The music video for the song was released on 29 November 2017.

== Conception ==
In an interview with Australian radio station triple J, frontman Matthew Murphy said, "I was in Los Angeles, driving along Mulholland, and I was having an argument with my now-wife and she basically just handed me my own arse on a plate. I never win an argument with her, so that's kind of what the song is about."

== Reception ==
The song was generally well received by critics. The Edge UK described it as a song "soaked in emotion". Harry Fortuna writes, "The lyrics offer a melancholy that has become deeply associated with the Wombats, but successfully aligns it with the up-tempo, dance-inducing indie beat that is fit to take this once overlooked band to mainstream stardom." Rolling Stone described it as a song "full of electric buzzing guitars and firm percussion". Atwood Magazine described it as "violent and mysterious" while praising Murphy's clear vocals and the band's "signature jangly riffy guitar". The song was featured on BBC Radio 1's "Tune of the Week", as well as Radio 1's "Specialist Chart" in 2017.

== Personnel ==
- Matthew Murphy
- Tord Øverland Knudsen
- Dan Haggis
- Mark Crew – production
- Catherine Marks – production

== Charts ==
Chart (2018)	Peak position
UK Indie (OCC)	24

== Certifications ==
Region	Certification	Certified units/sales
United Kingdom (BPI)	Silver	200,000^{‡}
^{‡} Sales+streaming figures based on certification alone.
