= RadioBDC =

Internet radio station in Boston, Massachusetts

- Boston, Massachusetts; United States

Programming
- Format: Alternative Rock

History
- First air date: August 13, 2012
- Last air date: April 1, 2018

RadioBDC was a commercial alternative rock music internet radio station based in Boston, Massachusetts.

== History ==
Shortly before Phoenix Media/Communications Group sold WFNX to Clear Channel Communications, boston.com hired longtime WFNX staffers Henry Santoro, Julie Kramer, Adam 12 and Paul Driscoll to DJ their new internet radio station, RadioBDC. Boston.com created RadioBDC to provide a soundtrack for their website visitors. The letters BDC in RadioBDC Stand for "Boston Dot Com."

RadioBDC officially launched on August 13, 2012 at noon EST. The first song they played was "I Want My City Back" by Boston-native band The Mighty Mighty Bosstones, which was chosen in a poll by Boston.com readers after 3,700 votes. Dicky Barrett, the frontman for The Bosstones was on the phone with the staff for the launch.

On March 26, 2018 it was announced that RadioBDC would be spun off from boston.com and be re-branded as Indie617.com. The new station launched on Monday April 2, 2018.
