= Lance Norris =

American actor

- Born: August 9, 1962; Des Moines, Iowa
- Died: December 10, 2023 (aged 61)

Lance Norris (August 9, 1962 – December 10, 2023) was an American actor/writer/director/stand-up comic/critic/mentalist.

== Life and career ==
Norris was born in Des Moines, Iowa, and attended Emerson College and Whitman College. Norris contributed to morning shows for Boston's WBCN and WZLX. He collected some of his radio scripts as the book Ask A Bitter Man. He was also a consultant for the short-lived Mike O'Malley Show on NBC, and wrote for the Emmy-nominated Politically Incorrect with Bill Maher on Comedy Central and Saturday Night Live's Weekend Update on NBC. He was listed as a Contributing Editor in one issue of the National Lampoon, in 1994. Norris has written a number of plays including 8 Gr8 D8s and JWL and taught acting workshops. He is an adjunct professor at the University of Massachusetts Amherst. His band, Lance Norris and The Dog Track Gravy, are currently active in the Northeast college and club market. His song "Good Morning" is played every morning at 7:00 on Radio A1A in Key West. The song was also used as the theme music for The Big Mattress on WBCN in Boston in the 90's.

== Televised performances ==
- NOS4A2 (2019)
- Castle Rock (2018)
- SMILF (2017)
- The Stools (2015)
- 20/20 (November 26, 2001)
- Saturday Night Live (1994)
- America's Funniest People (October 17, 1993)
- Politically Incorrect (1994)
- The Mike O’Malley Show (1999)
- Against The Law (1990)
- The Movie Loft (2001)

== Feature films ==
- Don't Look Up (2021)
- Coda (2021)
- I Care a Lot (2020)
- The Equalizer 2 (2018)
- Graduates (2018)
- Proud Mary (2018)
- Daddy's Home 2 (2017)
- Super Troopers 2 (2017)
- The Polka King (2017)
- The Finest Hours (2016)
- Bleed for This (2015)
- Spotlight (2015)
- Ted 2 (2015)
- The Equalizer (2014)
- The Judge (2014)
- American Hustle (2013)
- The Heat (2013)
- Zookeeper (2011)
- The Town (2010)
- The Invention of Lying (2009)
- Mystic River (2003)
- Anathema (2003)
- No Sleep (2005)
- Be Cool (2004)
- The Mouse (1996)
- With Honors (1994)
- Luther the Geek (1990)
- Glory (1989)
- Lung Foo Chuk Gang II (1989)
- Daihao Meizhouboa (1989)
- God of Gamblers (1989)
- Tong Gen Sheng (1989)
- Lie Mo Qun Ying (1989)

== Discography ==
- Meat The Stools (1989)
- Sophomore Slump (1990)
- Khaki (1990)
- Soft as a Grape (1991)
- The Unplayable Lie (1992)
- X-mas With The Stools (1994)
- All of Mao's Good Little Children Sing The Songs of Lance Norris (1995)
- Draconian Measures (1998)
- Nine Inch Jails (2000)
- Samples- A Musical Ouvre-View of The Stools (2004)
- Untraditionally Handsome (2010)
- A Case of The Vapors (2012)
- Music To Fight Teenaged Loitering (2013)
- Punch Buggy Yellow (2014)
- Punch Buggy Red (2014)
- Punch Buggy Green (2014)
- I'll Snuggle When I'm Dead (2014)
- Rock Is Dead: Long Live Paper And Scissors (2014)
- I Just Can't Get Enough of That Minimalism (2015)
- Duck and Cover (2015)
- Grandma Was A Dancer (2015)
- At The Corner of Sheer Narcissism and Crippling Self-Doubt (2015)
- Work Songs For The 1% (2016)
- Y'all Outa Here (2016)
- Proof of Life (2016)
- Abnctka Roadski (2016)
- Greatest Hits (Plus 12 New Songs) (2016)
- Chinese Whisper (2016)
- Boom Dada Boom (2016)
- Done A Runner (2016)
- Forlorn Hope (2016)
- The Revenge of The Turkracken (2016)
- Welcome To Trumpmerica (2017)
- As Beers Go By (2020)

== Collected work ==
- Ask A Bitter Man Vol. 1, 1992, Dutchco Press. ISBN 1-4116-2646-X
- I've Seen Better Film on the Teeth of Wolverines, 2007. Dutchco Press. ISBN 978-0-615-15938-6
- The Drunken Tweets of Donald J. Trump Vol 1, 2017, Dutchco Press ISBN 978-1-387-38134-0
- The Brummagem Screwdriver, 2018, Dutchco Press ISBN 978-1-387-64124-6

== See also ==
- Derren Brown
- Pseudoscience
- True-believer syndrome
