= Billy Costa =

American radio and television personality

- Born: William Anthony Costa; December 24, 1952 (age 73); Cambridge, Massachusetts
- Education: Emerson College
- Known for: Radio and television host

William Anthony Costa (born December 24, 1952) is an American radio and television host in the Boston area, best known since 2022 as the host of the Billy and Lisa in the Morning show on WXKS-FM in Boston.

== Early life ==
Costa grew up in East Cambridge, Massachusetts, where he graduated from Cambridge Rindge and Latin School. He attended Merrimack College in Massachusetts on a hockey scholarship, majoring in English.

He and his parents are of Portuguese ancestry. Costa’s parents died before his radio career truly took off, with his father dying at 48 and his mother at 52.

After transferring to Emerson College in Boston, he found a job as a disc jockey at a local nightclub. He later joined the Emerson radio station, WERS, as a DJ.

After graduating from Emerson with a degree in English, Costa worked at a few other radio stations, including WBOS, before contacting WXKS-FM "Kiss 108" in 1980 for a lifestyle/entertainment news show he proposed.

Costa pays his ex-wife $26,000 monthly in alimony.

== Radio and TV ==
=== Matty In The Morning (1980 – May 3, 2022) ===
Costa told Kiss 108 about a lifestyle/entertainment segment he could host. This evolved into his Top 30 Countdown which is broadcast every Saturday morning and Sunday evening.

Costa co-hosted Matty In The Morning with Matt Siegel and Lisa Donovan from 2001 until Siegel's retirement on May 3, 2022.

=== Billy and Lisa In The Morning (August 8, 2022 – present) ===
On May 3, 2022, Costa was named the new permanent host of Kiss 108's morning radio show Matty in the Morning following former host Siegel’s announcement of his retirement. Costa hosts Billy and Lisa In The Morning with Donovan, Justin Augirre, and Winnie Akoury on weekday mornings from 6 to 10 am.

=== TV (1993 – present) ===
Costa was the host of The Phantom Gourmet, a restaurant review show, which broadcast its first episode on June 26, 1993. In 2003, Costa moved to a new show, TV Diner on New England Cable News (NECN), which was cancelled in September 2013. Costa now hosts Dining Playbook with Jenny Johnson on New England Sports Network (NESN).

In 2011, Costa started hosting a WGBH-TV show, High School Quiz Show and continued through 2023. He was succeeded in 2024 by PBS Digital Studios host Joe Hanson.

== Awards ==
Costa has received an Emmy Award nomination for his work on Evening Magazine and has received a Children's Television Award for Rap Around, his kids' talk show.
