= WZRM =

Spanish-language contemporary hit radio station in Boston

- Brockton, Massachusetts; United States
- Broadcast area: Greater Boston
- Frequency: 97.7 MHz (HD Radio)
- Branding: Rumba 97.7

Programming
- Language: Spanish
- Format: Contemporary hit radio
- Affiliations: Premiere Networks

Ownership
- Owner: iHeartMedia; (iHM Licenses, LLC)
- Sister stations: WBWL; WBZ; WJMN; WRKO; WXKS; WXKS-FM; WZLX

History
- First air date: July 21, 1948
- Former call signs: WBET-FM (1948–1977); WCAV (1977–1999); WBOT (1999–2005); WILD-FM (2005–2006); WKAF (2006–2021)
- Call sign meaning: "Rumba"

Technical information
- Licensing authority: FCC
- Facility ID: 19633
- Class: A
- ERP: 2,050 watts
- HAAT: 173 meters (568 ft)
- Transmitter coordinates: 42°12′42.4″N 71°6′49.2″W

Links
- Public license information: Public file; LMS
- Webcast: Listen live (via iHeartRadio)
- Website: rumba977.iheart.com

WZRM (97.7 FM, "Rumba 97.7") is a Spanish-language radio station in the Boston market, carrying a Spanish contemporary hits format. Owned and operated by iHeartMedia, it serves the Metro Boston and South Shore areas of Massachusetts, and is licensed to Brockton. The station's studios are located in Medford and the transmitter site is atop Great Blue Hill.

== History ==
=== WBET-FM and WCAV ===
WZRM first went on the air in 1948 as WBET-FM, the sister station of WBET (990 AM, now WBMS 1460) in Brockton (WBET would subsequently buy WBKA 1450 and WBKA-FM 107.1, shut down the WBKA stations, and move its AM facility from 990 to 1460). The two stations almost always simulcast programming for the next 28 years. On November 1, 1976, WBET-FM went stereo and broke away from the AM to broadcast a top 40 format. On January 1, 1977, the call letters were changed to WCAV. In July 1982, the station switched to country music and targeted the South Shore of Massachusetts. This format continued until 1999. For some of that time, WCAV was the only country music station on the FM dial in the Greater Boston area.

=== WBOT and WILD-FM ===
In 1999, WCAV was purchased by Radio One, a company that owns and operates radio stations which target African American communities. Radio One made many transmitter improvements and established new studios in Roxbury, a largely African American section of Boston. After weeks of dead air and a five-day long stunt of a loop of Tone Lōc's "Wild Thing", the station was relaunched on December 6, 1999, as WBOT, Hot 97.7, targeting the Greater Boston area with a mainstream urban format.

From the very beginning, the 97.7 signal had been plagued by a poor signal in Boston and points north. However, after the relocation of WBOT's transmitter to Great Blue Hill in Milton, Massachusetts, in summer 2005, the station's signal improved dramatically.

WBOT never made any significant strides against its main competitor (and eventual sister station) WJMN ("Jam'n 94.5"), a station which had no signal problem and depended chiefly on the region's large Caucasian population for success. At the same time, Radio One had been experiencing great success with the urban adult contemporary and urban oldies format of WILD (1090), an AM radio station that was prohibited by Federal Communications Commission (FCC) regulations from operating at night.

On October 20, 2005, Radio One moved the format and intellectual property of WILD to WBOT's FM signal. This move eliminated WBOT from the Boston radio dial, and created the new 97.7 WILD FM. WILD-FM would air the urban adult contemporary programming previously heard on WILD (AM) during the day, and aired the old WBOT's mainstream urban format during the late afternoon and early evening hours. The station officially changed call letters to WILD-FM on October 26, 2005.

The former "Hot 97.7" format subsequently reappeared on 97.5, before moving to 87.7 as a pirate radio station. The operations on these frequencies were not affiliated with Radio One. The station was shut down in 2010. The group now maintains a web-only presence.

=== Entercom buys WILD-FM ===
On August 20, 2006, radio industry website All Access reported that Entercom had agreed to purchase WILD-FM from Radio One; by the next day, Entercom had assumed control of the station via an LMA, and WILD-FM signed off with "Wild Thing" by Tone-Loc at about 7:00 p.m., as the station began stunting with Microsoft Sam's voice reciting a countdown (while interspersing a random quote a few times every 30 seconds or 1 minute) to 5:30 p.m. the following day, August 22, 2006. At that time, the station began simulcasting Worcester-based rock station WAAF, with the first song under the simulcast being "For Those About To Rock (We Salute You)" by AC/DC. The station changed its calls to WKAF on August 30, 2006, to reflect the new simulcast.

The move expanded the signal reach of WAAF to cover Boston, the Route 128 corridor and the South Shore. However, both WAAF and WKAF still had signal issues in much of Southeastern Massachusetts and the North Shore.

=== The New 97.7/The Beat ===
During December 2016, rumors were circulating that Entercom was planning to split the WAAF simulcast and flip WKAF to an urban format in January 2017. In addition, the Twitter profiles for the new afternoon hosts of WAAF only mentioned 107.3 FM; a simulcast for the station was also added onto the HD2 channel of WKAF and the HD3 channel of WEEI-FM, which, as HD Radio did not have signal interference, could cover areas of Boston that 107.3 didn't cover, thus eliminating the need for a simulcast and making room for such a move. Those rumors were confirmed on the 3rd, as WKAF began running liners redirecting listeners to WAAF, the aforementioned HD channels, or WAAF's online stream. On January 5, 2017, at 10:50 a.m., in the middle of playing "You've Got Another Thing Coming" by Judas Priest, WKAF split from the simulcast and flipped back to urban adult contemporary with a heavy rhythmic oldies base, branded as "The New 97.7". The first song was "Cool It Now" by Boston's own New Edition.

On February 2, 2017, CBS Radio (which locally owned WBZ (AM), WBZ-FM, WBMX, WODS, and WZLX) announced it would merge with Entercom. On October 10, 2017, CBS Radio announced that as part of the process of obtaining regulatory approval of the merger, WKAF would be one of sixteen stations that would be divested by Entercom, along with sister station WRKO, WBZ (AM), WBZ-FM, and WZLX. On November 1, 2017, iHeartMedia announced that they would acquire WKAF, WBZ (AM), WRKO and WZLX (WBZ-FM would be swapped to Beasley Broadcast Group in exchange for WMJX). To meet ownership limits set by the FCC, iHeart would place WKOX into the Ocean Stations Trust in order to be sold off to a different owner. The merger was approved on November 9, 2017, and was consummated on November 17. iHeart then began operating WKAF, WBZ, and WZLX under a local marketing agreement. The sale of WKAF, WRKO, WZLX, and WBZ to iHeart was completed on December 19, 2017.

On June 28, 2019, at 6:00 a.m., after playing "End of the Road" by Boyz II Men, WKAF flipped to a self-described "rhythmic classic hits" format as "97.7 The Beat", which was a variation of the rhythmic oldies format featuring rhythmic and pop hits from the 1980s, 1990s, and 2000s. The first song on "The Beat" was "Beat It" by Michael Jackson.

=== Rumba 97.7 ===
Previous logo

On May 24, 2021, at noon, after playing "It's So Hard to Say Goodbye to Yesterday" by Boyz II Men, WKAF began stunting with unbranded Spanish language music, while promoting an announcement to take place the following day at noon. At the promised time, the station flipped to a Spanish-language contemporary hits format as "Rumba 97.7". The first song on "Rumba" was "Dakiti" by Bad Bunny. This move returned the format and branding to the market, as it had previously broadcast on WKOX until the station's sale the previous year (as well as a previous simulcast with the station and WXKS (AM) from 2006 to 2010). On June 2, 2021, WKAF changed its call sign to WZRM to match the "Rumba" branding.
