= WJMN (FM) =

Rhythmic contemporary radio station in Boston

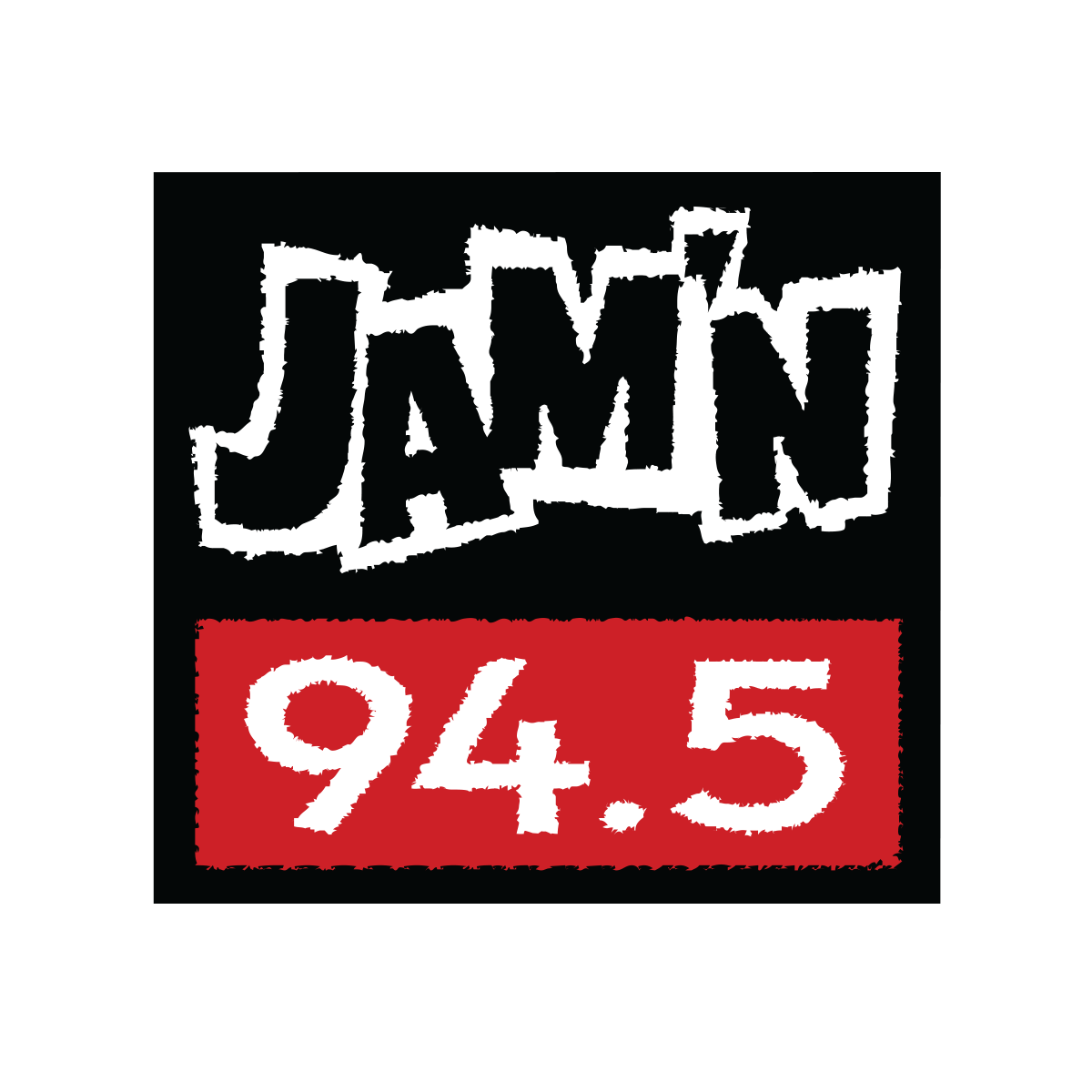
- Boston, Massachusetts; United States
- Broadcast area: Greater Boston
- Frequency: 94.5 MHz (HD Radio)
- Branding: Jam'n 94.5

Programming
- Format: Rhythmic CHR
- Subchannels: HD2: Black Information Network

Ownership
- Owner: iHeartMedia; (iHM Licenses, LLC)
- Sister stations: WBWL; WBZ; WRKO; WXKS; WXKS-FM; WZLX; WZRM

History
- First air date: March 31, 1948
- Former call signs: WHDH-FM (1948–1972); WCOZ (1972–1984); WZOU (1984–1993)
- Call sign meaning: "Jam'n"

Technical information
- Licensing authority: FCC
- Facility ID: 53972
- Class: B
- ERP: 9,200 watts
- HAAT: 353 meters (1,158 ft)
- Transmitter coordinates: 42°18′27.3″N 71°13′25.20″W

Links
- Public license information: Public file; LMS
- Webcast: Listen live (via iHeartRadio)
- Website: jamn945.iheart.com

WJMN (94.5 FM) is a rhythmic CHR radio station licensed to Boston, Massachusetts, United States, and is owned and operated by iHeartMedia. The station's studios are located in Medford and its transmitter site is in Newton, Massachusetts.

== History ==
=== WHDH-FM (1948–1972) ===
WJMN was originally WHDH-FM: a sister station to, and simulcast of, WHDH (850 AM). In 1965, to comply with a Federal Communications Commission regulation limiting simulcasting between commonly owned AM and FM stations in the same city, WHDH-FM began separate programming with an automated middle-of-the-road format in stereo. In late 1967, WHDH-FM changed its format to automated progressive rock (predating future FM rocker WBCN by several months), but by late 1969, the station returned to automated beautiful music after a little "intervention", allegedly from WHDH Inc.'s chief executive officer, Harold J. Clancy (who did not particularly approve of putting rock and roll on "MY FM station!"). Although this format remained until 1975, it was not particularly successful, despite a 1972 attempt to establish a separate identity by changing the call letters to WCOZ (as in "Cozy").

=== WCOZ (1972–1984) ===
Originally owned by Herald-Traveler Corp., parent of the Boston Herald-Traveler newspaper, the station was sold to Blair Radio in 1972, and in the 1980s to Sconnix. Several ownership changes followed which eventually resulted in Clear Channel Communications (now iHeartMedia) acquiring 94.5 FM.

In the summer of 1975, WCOZ announced that it would change its format to an album-oriented rock station under their new name WCOZ 94½ FM, which it did on August 15 of that year. Although automated at first, a team of live announcers was hired, led by Kenny Shelton and program director Clark Smidt. By the end of 1975, WCOZ had live announcers around the clock that also included George Taylor Morris, Leslie Palmiter, Lisa Karlin, Mark Parenteau and Robert Desiderio. Talking Heads performed a session at the station's studio in 1977, tracks from which appear on their 1981 live album The Name of This Band is Talking Heads. The entirety of the session was issued as Live at WCOZ '77 in 2024.

WCOZ's format was tightened significantly in 1978, when new program director Tommy Hadges arrived from arch rival WBCN. Parenteau simultaneously defected to WBCN at that point. In 1980, another new program director, John Sebastian, arrived and made some changes. WCOZ was still a rock station, but its focus was tightened to loud, hard rock (or "Kickass Rock 'N' Roll!", according to the station's slogan) with minimal announcer talk and short play list. It was extremely successful, peaking with a 13.1 in the ratings in 1982, but with the changes in rock music during the 1980s, the station's success did not last; its rival WBCN moved past it in the ratings. By late 1983, WCOZ had changed formats to a short lived adult contemporary format.

=== WZOU (1984–1993) ===
In September 1984, the station's call letters were changed to WZOU, and flipped to a Top 40 format to compete against WXKS-FM and WHTT. In 1986, it became known as Z-94. Program director David Gariano had success with the Top 40 format, which featured original 1984 personalities Mike Morin and Brad Krantz, Jeff Michaels, Steve York, Jim Cutler, Uncle Johnny, Jon "Rock N Roll" Anthony, Marc Mitchell, and Scott Brunner. In 1985, Pat McKay and Karen "The Madam" Blake joined the morning team. In June 1987, Dan McCoy arrived to do afternoons and eventually moved to mid-days, where he remained until April 1990. WZOU was Boston's affiliate for Rick Dees Weekly Top 40.

Though WHTT would change formats in 1986, WXKS-FM successfully adapted to a Top 40/CHR format in December 1982, and would cut into Z-94's ratings later in the decade. What also didn't help the station's ratings was the declining popularity of the format in the late 1980s–early 1990s.

=== WJMN (1993–present) ===
Since its inception on May 11, 1993, "Jam'n 94.5" has become one of Boston's most successful radio stations. Even after its sale to Chancellor in 1996, station management decided not to tamper with the format as they see WJMN as part of a winning combination with top 40/CHR sister station WXKS-FM, a formula that continues to the present day.

When "Jam'n" debuted, the station had a playlist of a balanced mix of R&B/hip-hop, rhythmic pop, and dance product (the same approach was used at WXKS-FM when it made the transition from disco to urban in 1981, and then to Top 40 the following year). However, by the end of 1999, it began to play a variety of music that was along the lines of urban contemporary hits, heavy on the hip-hop to the extent of not playing non-rap rhythmic tracks. This would last until the beginning of 2009, when WJMN began tweaking their musical selection to once again include rhythmic/pop-charting artists like Britney Spears, Justin Bieber, Kesha, Katy Perry, David Guetta, Edward Maya, Adele, and Lady Gaga. This tweaking has sparked a lot of talk on radio message boards and follows a pattern among rhythmic-format stations that have scaled back on the heavy amount of hip-hop in favor of a more balanced approach. This continued until mid 2013, when facing competition from rhythmic AC-formatted WBQT (which features some of WJMN's former airstaff), WJMN has added more hip hop and R&B content and scaled back on dance tracks, but still remains rhythmic. Because of this, several music trades (like Mediabase) and Nielsen Audio have listed WJMN as Rhythmic because the audience it targets is racially mixed and the region's African-American population is not that large. Primetime mixshow mainstay DJ Roy Barboza was known for his flawless style of mixing, and as one of New England's premier mix-masters. DJ Gee Spin showcased his polished skill on the turntables, hosting 'The Launch Pad' on Sunday evenings. The early 2000's also saw a cross-over/strategic partnership which featured Hot 97 NYC Superstar DJ Funkmaster Flex on WJMN airwaves.

WJMN's voiceover artist was, at first, Brian James. From the late 1990s until 2019, the station's voiceover artist was Eric Edwards; he has since been replaced by Lucas Nugent. "Jam'n" morning drive, for the first two years, was hosted by John "J.R." Edwards. In February 1995, Baltazar, former night show host at WQHT in New York City, took over mornings. Two months later, Pebbles, formerly of WILD, became morning co-host. The duo were very popular among Boston listeners, particularly with younger audiences. Baltazar left the show on October 26, 2001, giving way to the "Ramiro and Pebbles Morning Show" when afternoon host Ramiro Torres moved to mornings. Pebbles was unexpectedly let go from the station in December 2012, with mornings then hosted by Torres, Santi "Krazy Kulo" DeOleo and Ashlee Feldman, under the name "The Ramiro's House Morning Show". Torres and DeOleo were let go in July 2015 due to their contracts not being renewed. Frankie Vinci, formerly of station KHTS in San Diego (and also a native of the nearby suburb of Framingham), would join the morning show alongside Feldman, with the show now titled "The Jam'n Morning Show w/ Frankie & Ashlee." On May 12, 2016, WJMN replaced Vinci and Feldman with the syndicated Breakfast Club from sister WWPR-FM in New York. On March 25, 2019, Feldman and DeOleo would return to mornings, and would be joined by longtime station mixer DJ Pup Dawg and DJ 4eign.

WJMN also has an HD2 sub-channel that serves as a local affiliate of the Black Information Network, which is an all-news service specifically geared toward African-American listeners. It previously broadcast a soft adult contemporary format known as The Breeze from November 2018 to June 30, 2020. It also previously broadcast old-school hip hop music from January 27, 2006, to March 1, 2013, and offered a simulcast of sister station WXKS from then until November 2018.

For a time, Boston was the largest market without an urban-formatted radio station; heritage R&B AM daytimer WILD, which served the area's African-American community since 1967, began airing China Radio International programming in June 2011, and its one-time hip hop sister station WBOT (which later became urban AC WILD-FM), which gave the market its first full-time urban outlet on the FM band in 1999 despite having a weak signal, has been defunct since the summer of 2006, when Radio One (which owned both stations) sold it to Entercom and flipped it to a simulcast of WAAF as WKAF. However, in February 2016, AM station WZBR flipped from a simulcast of WSRO to urban (they have since changed formats). In January 2017, WKAF flipped back to urban AC, returning that format to the Boston market for the first time since WILD-FM flipped over ten years prior, and 11 months later, became a sister station to WJMN.
