= Phoenix Media/Communications Group =

American media corporation

Phoenix Media/Communications Group is an American, Boston, Massachusetts-based corporation with several publishing and broadcasting interests.

== Operations ==
Phoenix Media previously published The Boston Phoenix and Stuff Magazine, both of which went out of business in 2013, and the Providence Phoenix until its shutdown in 2014. The company also published the Portland Phoenix in Maine before the publication folded in February of 2019. A few months later, the publication was revived but closed in 2023 citing difficulties securing advertising relationships during the COVID-19 pandemic. In addition the paper-owned radio station WFNX based in Lynn, MA, from 1983 until 2012 when it was sold to Clear Channel and is now country music station WBWL (the WFNX call letters were subsequently used on an unrelated station in Athol, MA, now WKMY).

The Boston Phoenix has its origins in an alternative newsweekly started in 1966. In 1972, it absorbed Cambridge Phoenix, a rival publication, and the company has used the "Phoenix" name ever since. In 1998, the company acquired the newspaper in Rhode Island and re-christened that publication Providence Phoenix in 1993. In September 1999, the paper extended its reach into Maine and southern New Hampshire with the publication of the Portland Phoenix.

The sports and magazine division published the official yearbooks for the Boston Celtics, the Boston Bruins, and the Boston Marathon, in addition to program guides for the Tweeter Center for the Performing Arts, and the Bank of America Pavilion summer music series.

Through its Tele-publishing, Inc., subsidiary, Phoenix Media owns People2People.com, the world's largest provider of voice personals to the publishing industry. Phoenix Media also owns MassWeb Printing, an offset printing facility that prints many of its products plus many other regional newspapers.
