= Matt Siegel =

American retired radio personality (born 1950)

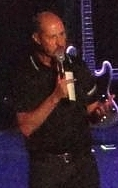
- Siegel in 2013
- Born: March 27, 1950 (age 76); Spring Valley, New York, U.S.
- Years active: 1972–2022
- Presenting career
- Show: The Matty in the Morning Show
- Station: WXKS-FM
- Country: United States
- Website: www.mattyinthemorning.com

Matt Siegel (born March 27, 1950) is an American retired radio personality. He was the host of the Matty in the Morning Show in Massachusetts on KISS 108 for 41 years, from 1981 to 2022. The show has a legacy in Boston; Matt has worked with a variety of co-hosts, including Bill Rossi, Lisa Lipps, and, most recently, Billy Costa and Lisa Donovan.

== Early life ==
Siegel's first introduction to the spotlight came during high school. Though a quiet and reserved student, he auditioned to emcee the school talent show. He got the gig and was told that he was a natural with the microphone. While Siegel was student teaching at Oneonta University, a professor who was amused by his classes, directed him towards show business.

His first job in radio was a daytime shift in Oneonta, New York, and then in 1972, he got a job with KWFM-FM in Tucson, AZ - a radical underground progressive rock station. From there he worked as a freelance producer and commercial voice-over announcer at Warner Bros. Records.

While vacationing in Boston in 1977, Siegel stumbled into a job opening with WBCN-FM. He filled in for Charles Laquidara, who had taken a leave of absence. After two months on the morning show, he was hired permanently as the midday host, where he stayed for 2½ years. There he created a spoof call-in show called Dr. Matt’s Advice to the Love Lorn, which, in turn, led to a job at WCVB-TV (Channel 5) hosting a show called Five All Night Live. This was followed by a national appearance on Life’s Most Embarrassing Moments with host Steve Allen.

In the summer of 1980, Siegel was offered the morning spot with KISS 108 FM, Matty in the Morning.

== Matty in the Morning Show (1981—2022) ==
Siegel was the host of KISS 108's morning show since it first aired on January 12, 1981. On the show with Siegel were co-hosts Billy Costa and Lisa Donovan, and producers Justin Aguirre, Winnie Akoury and Dominick Famularo.

Although Siegel was best known for his comedic and light-hearted approach to morning radio, two of his most memorable shows came in the wake of tragedy: September 11th and the Boston Marathon Bombings. During both instances, Siegel stayed on the air all day providing critical updates and a calm presence to his Boston listeners.

At approximately 9:20 a.m. on May 19, 2021, Siegel announced on air that his bosses had ordered him to stop discussing the news of Demi Lovato coming out as non-binary and ended the broadcast abruptly with the words "Matty out." WCVB confirmed later that day that Siegel would be returning to the show the following day.

On May 3, 2022, after an unexplained two week absence from the morning show, Siegel announced his retirement.

== An Evening with Matty in the Morning (2018 - present) ==
In 2018, Siegel announced a one-man comedy show at The Wilbur Theatre in Boston, called An Evening with Matty in the Morning. The show includes stories from his childhood, his career and a series of Q&As from the audience.

The first nine shows, which took place between 2018 and 2019, sold over 10,000 tickets. After a brief hiatus in 2020, he performed subsequent shows in 2021 and 2022.

== Personal life ==
Siegel lives in Palm Beach Gardens, FL with his wife Maryanne. He has four children. His daughter Alexandra Siegel has been featured in videos on Funny or Die, had a guest appearance on ABC Family's Switched at Birth as well as HBO's Eastbound & Down, and was featured in Taco Bell's 2014 commercial "Hello Father" and its 2016 follow up "Hold My Baby".

In 2017, director Hailey Millar created a short biographical documentary titled My Life is Not a Show which highlights Siegel's work and personal life.

== Awards ==
As host of Matty In The Morning, Siegel won the National Association of Broadcasters' Marconi Award for Personality of the Year (major market) in 2001 and 2009.

Siegel was inducted into the Massachusetts Broadcaster's Hall of Fame in 2012 and, after four nominations, was inducted into the National Radio Hall of Fame in 2024.
