= WBWL (FM) =

Country music radio station in Lynn–Boston, Massachusetts

- Lynn, Massachusetts; United States
- Broadcast area: Greater Boston
- Frequency: 101.7 MHz (HD Radio)
- Branding: 101.7 The Bull

Programming
- Format: Country music
- Subchannels: HD2: Pride Radio
- Affiliations: Premiere Networks

Ownership
- Owner: iHeartMedia; (iHM Licenses, LLC)
- Sister stations: WBZ; WJMN; WRKO; WXKS; WXKS-FM; WZLX; WZRM

History
- First air date: August 5, 1963
- Former call signs: WLYN-FM (1963–1977); WLYN (1977–1979); WLYN-FM (1979–1983); WFNX (1983–2012); WHBA (2012–2013); WEDX (2013–2014)
- Call sign meaning: phonetically pronounced as "Bull"

Technical information
- Licensing authority: FCC
- Facility ID: 40824
- Class: B1
- ERP: 13,500 watts
- HAAT: 138 meters (453 ft)
- Transmitter coordinates: 42°25′52″N 71°5′17″W

Links
- Public license information: Public file; LMS
- Webcast: Listen live (via iHeartRadio)
- Website: thebull1017.iheart.com

WBWL (101.7 FM) is a commercial radio station licensed to Lynn, Massachusetts, and serving Greater Boston. It is owned by iHeartMedia and it airs a country music format that includes some acoustic-driven pop crossover hits not otherwise heard on country radio. The studios are on Cabot Road off Revere Beach Parkway in Medford. The Bull carries two nationally syndicated country music programs: The Bobby Bones Show in morning drive time and After Midnite with Granger Smith overnight. From 1983 to 2012, the station was known as WFNX ("The Phoenix"), among the first to broadcast a modern rock format.

WBWL is a Class B1 FM station, with an effective radiated power (ERP) of 13,500 watts. Because it is short-spaced to co-owned WWBB (101.5 FM) in Providence and WCIB (101.9 FM) in Falmouth, WBWL cannot have the power of a full Class B station. It broadcasts using HD Radio technology, carrying "Pride Radio" on its HD2 digital subchannel. The transmitter site is on Murray Hill in Medford.

== History ==
=== WLYN-FM (1963–1982) ===
WBWL signed on August 5, 1963, as WLYN-FM, owned by Puritan Broadcasting Service along with WLYN (1360 AM). At the outset, WLYN-FM largely simulcast its AM sister station during hours in which the AM was on the air. During the 1970s, the simulcast was cut to drive time, with WLYN-FM brokering the remaining time to ethnic programmers; by 1974, the station's English-language programming included country music. Although WLYN changed its call letters to WNSR in 1977, WLYN-FM retained its call sign, but dropped the "-FM" suffix; both changes were reversed on December 31, 1979.

WLYN-FM began to devote its nighttime programming to new wave music in 1981. The following year, the station had become a full-time modern rock station known as "Y102", with the ethnic programming moving to the AM station.

=== WFNX (1982–2012) ===
In September 1982, Puritan announced that it would sell WLYN-FM to Stephen Mindich, publisher of the Boston Phoenix; the station eventually became part of the Phoenix Media/Communications Group. Mindich retained the modern rock format upon assuming control in March 1983, relaunching it on April 11 as "Boston Phoenix Radio", with the WFNX call letters coming into use ten days earlier. WFNX would subsequently become one of the earliest alternative rock stations. The classic rock of the previous owners were gradually replaced with new wave, "deep cuts", British punk, and a sprinkling of jazz and reggae. The first song on WFNX was "Let's Go to Bed" by The Cure.

WFNX broadened its focus to Greater Boston after the sale to Mindich, opening a sales office at the Phoenix offices in Boston, but its studios remained in the same building as WLYN in Lynn. The station did move its transmitter from WLYN's tower in Lynn to Medford in 1987 to provide a better signal within the market.

At 7 pm on August 29, 1991, WFNX DJ Kurt St. Thomas gave Nirvana's album Nevermind its world premiere by playing the album from start to finish. Nirvana's 1993 Nevermind It's an Interview limited-edition promotional release on Geffen Records was produced and engineered at the station by Kurt St. Thomas and Troy Smith. The original interview sessions were recorded by St. Thomas the night of Nirvana's first appearance on NBC's Saturday Night Live in 1992.

In October 1992, the station launched One in Ten, a program dedicated to lesbian, gay, bisexual and transgender issues. The show was broadcast until 2010.

The station sponsored a free Green Day concert at the Hatch Memorial Shell in Boston on September 9, 1994. An estimated 70,000 to 100,000 showed up, which WFNX, the Metropolitan District Commission and the Massachusetts State Police were not prepared for. The concert ended 20 minutes into Green Day's set when the crowd became uncontrollable, leaving 100 people injured, 24 of whom were sent to local hospitals, and 31 were arrested.

WFNX had a long history of breaking new bands. WFNX became the first commercial radio station to broadcast Allen Ginsberg's Howl on Friday, July 18, 1997, despite U.S. Federal Communications Commission Safe Harbor laws.

WFNX continued to expand its reach starting in 1998, when it established a translator station, W276AI (101.3 FM), on the John Hancock Tower to improve WFNX's reception in Boston. During 1999 and 2000, Phoenix Media/Communications Group also acquired WCDQ (92.1 FM, renamed WPHX-FM) in Sanford, Maine, WNHQ (92.1 FM, renamed WFEX) in Peterborough, New Hampshire, and WWRX-FM (103.7 FM) in Westerly, Rhode Island, to serve as WFNX simulcast stations. WWRX-FM was sold to Entercom, eventually becoming WVEI-FM, in 2004.

On March 30, 2006, WFNX vastly increased its power after receiving permission from the FCC to begin broadcasting from a new transmitter and a new antenna located atop One Financial Center in downtown Boston. To promote its signal upgrade in downtown Boston, WFNX sold all of its commercial ad time to beverage maker Snapple from Memorial Day, May 29 through Independence Day, July 4, 2006, (both are national holidays in the United States). The unique deal allowed the station to eliminate traditional commercial breaks for that time. Following WFNX's move, operation of W267AI (101.3 FM) was discontinued as superfluous. Even after its series of expansions, WFNX broadcast at a lower power than other Boston market stations, limiting WFNX's signal in the outer portions of the market.

The combination of WFNX's signal upgrade and the departure of Howard Stern from WBCN resulted in a significant ratings change in the core rock 18–34 demographic in Boston starting in 2006. Arbitron Ratings four ratings books in 2007 (Fall 2006, Winter 2007, Spring 2007, Summer 2007) showed that WFNX's weekday 18–34 audience share had increased by 43% over 2005, while WBCN's 18–34 share decreased by 39% from 2005. Ratings hit their high point in the Fall of 2008 thanks to the success of morning show "The Sandbox". WFNX was never able to get over the 12+ hump of 1.0 following that mark.

WPHX-FM was sold to Aruba Capital Partners in 2011; its simulcast of WFNX ended on August 11, when it relaunched as WXEX-FM.

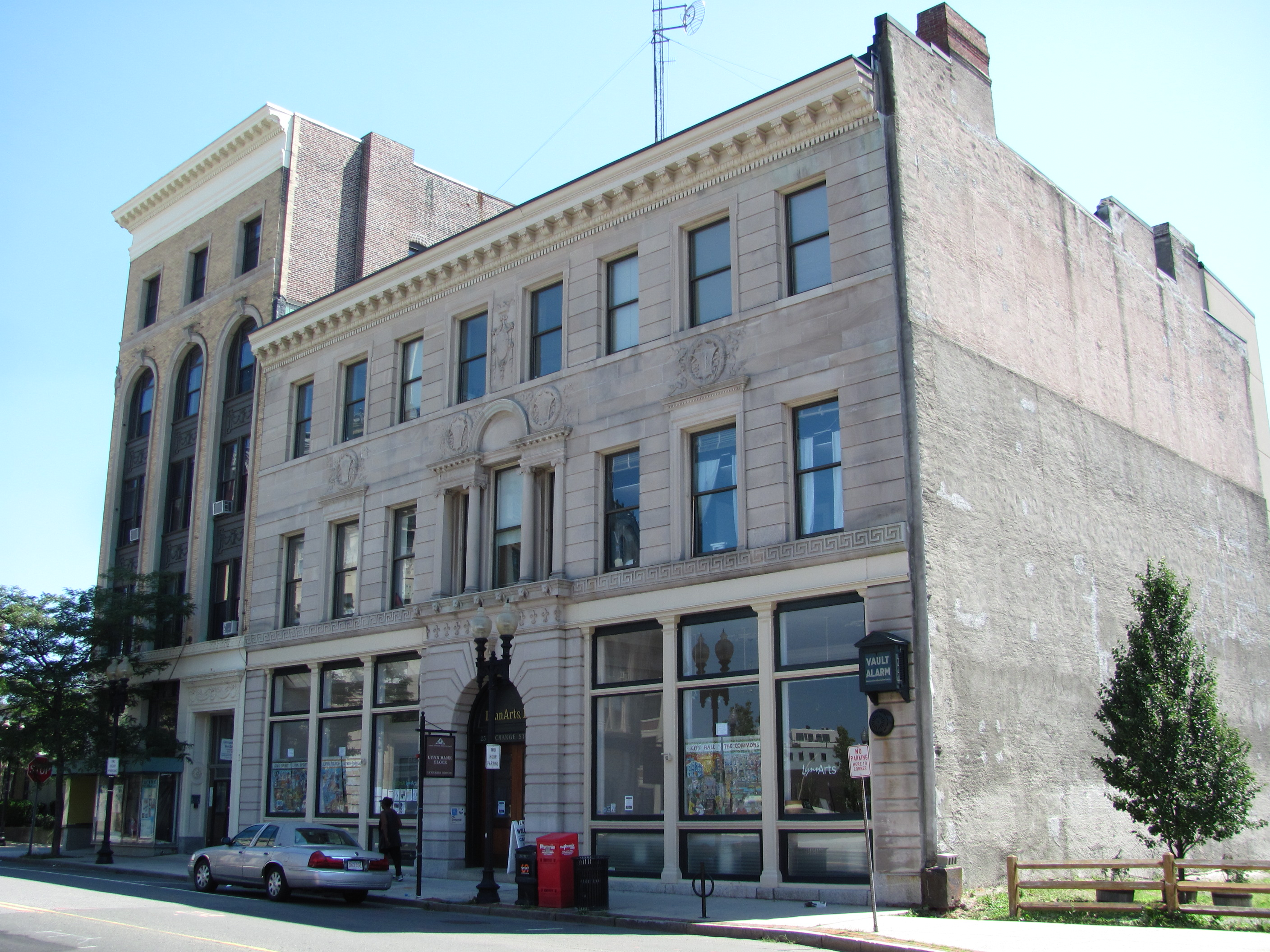
The studios and offices of WFNX were located on the second floor of 25 Exchange Street in Lynn, with the station's studio/transmitter link antenna mast on the roof.

On May 16, 2012, Phoenix Media/Communications Group announced that it would sell WFNX to iHeartMedia (then known as Clear Channel Communications) for $14.5 million, after finding it difficult to sustain its continued operation. The next day, WFEX was sold to Blount Communications, which would rename that station WDER-FM. Live programming ended on July 20, 2012, with the last song being "Let's Go to Bed" by the Cure (the first song on WFNX in 1983); an automated version of WFNX remained available online until March 2013, when the Boston Phoenix publication shut down (citing huge financial losses), and was also heard on 101.7 FM until 4:00 p.m. on July 24, 2012, when Clear Channel assumed control of the station. At that time, after playing "Shake It Out" by Florence and the Machine, 101.7 began stunting with a loop of the Boston-famous song "Dirty Water" by the Standells.

The 2012 sale of the station to Clear Channel did not include WFNX's intellectual property, and the Phoenix continued to stream automated music on WFNX.com. The company had plans to eventually launch WFNX.com as a full-service internet radio station. On August 17, 2012, WFNX hired former programming director Kurt St. Thomas as executive producer for the internet station.

WFNX.com officially relaunched as an internet station at midnight October 31, 2012. The first song played on the revived station was "Comeback Kid" by Sleigh Bells.

Shortly before the sale of the station, The Boston Globe announced plans for an online alternative rock station for its Boston.com website, and later hired former WFNX DJs Adam 12, Julie Kramer, Paul Driscoll, and Henry Santoro. The station, RadioBDC, launched on August 13, 2012.

On March 14, 2013, it was announced that WFNX.com would not continue in its current form after the announcement that the Boston Phoenix would be shutting down. At midnight on March 19, 2013, WFNX.com was officially shut down; the final song played on the station was "Old Friend" by Sea Wolf.

As for the WFNX call letters, they would later be picked up by a radio station in Athol. After that station was sold and changed call letters to WKMY in 2020, the WFNX call letters would move to a station in Grand Marais, Minnesota. On January 23, 2024, the Minnesota station returned its license to the Federal Communications Commission (FCC) rendering the WFNX call letters available for reassignment. On February 5, 2024, Scituate Community Radio, a new low-power FM (LPFM) station licensed to Scituate, was granted the WFNX-LP call letters bringing the WFNX call letters back to Massachusetts. WFNX-LP currently airs an Adult Album Alternative and community affairs format.

=== WHBA (2012) ===
At approximately 4:28 p.m. on July 24, 2012, WFNX relaunched as WHBA, an adult hits station branded as "101.7 The Harbor". The first song on "The Harbor" was "Sweet Emotion" by locally founded band Aerosmith. The launch of WHBA marked the return of the adult hits format to the Boston market; a similar format aired on WMKK (93.7 FM) from March 2005 until it became WEEI-FM in September 2011. The station launched with commercial free music through Labor Day. During its short life, the station never had DJs.

=== WEDX (2012–2014) ===
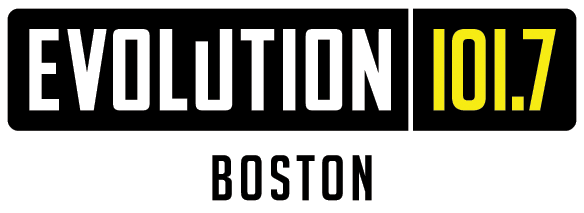
WEDX's logo as "Evolution 101.7", used from December 20, 2012, to June 12, 2014

On December 20, 2012, at 6:00 pm, the station flipped to dance, branded as "Evolution 101.7"; the format had been launched as an online station on Clear Channel's iHeartRadio service six weeks earlier. The final song on "The Harbor" was "Sweet Caroline" by Neil Diamond (a song that has become synonymous with the city of Boston through its playing at Fenway Park during Red Sox games), while the first song on "Evolution" was "Don't You Worry Child" by Swedish House Mafia. As "Evolution", the station claimed to be "the first real EDM station in the country." The call letters were changed to WEDX on January 2, 2013. On January 14, 2013, Sisanie, who provides voicetracks for several top 40 and rhythmic top 40 stations also owned by iHeartMedia (including WEDX's sister station WXKS-FM), became the first "airstaffer" to be added to WEDX's daily lineup, voicetracking in afternoons. In December 2013, the station began simulcasting on WXKS-FM's HD2 channel, which previously broadcast an all-comedy format. The move occurred due to WEDX's limited signal, which is nulled to the south to protect Providence and Cape Cod-based sister stations WWBB (101.5 FM) and WCIB (101.9 FM).

=== WBWL (2014–present) ===
On June 13, 2014, at noon, after playing "How You Love Me" by 3lau, WEDX began airing a country music stunt and asking listeners to go online and use the hashtag "#CountryOn1017" to vote on what artists the station should play. At 3:00 pm, WEDX officially flipped to country, branded as "101.7 The Bull". The first song on "The Bull" was "This Is How We Roll" by Florida-Georgia Line. The new format competes against established country station WKLB-FM (102.5 FM), and serves as the Boston affiliate of the syndicated Bobby Bones Show. "Evolution" remained available through WXKS-FM's HD2 channel, the iHeartRadio mobile application, and in early-morning blocks on Saturdays and Sundays on WXKS-FM; "Evolution" returned to 101.7 on its HD2 channel on December 19, 2017. The call letters were changed to WBWL on June 30, 2014, to match the new format.

iHeartMedia had filed with the FCC to downgrade the signals of stations it owns in Rhode Island (WWBB) and on Cape Cod (WCIB), which enabled WBWL to offer a non-directional, upgraded signal, from the previous transmitter site in Medford. The modifications were completed in August 2014.

"Evolution" would be removed from WBWL-HD2 entirely on June 26, 2019, when it flipped to iHeart's "Pride Radio" format of Top 40/Dance music targeting the LGBTQ community. This marks the second such format to air in Boston, the other being Entercom's "Channel Q" network airing on WBGB-HD2.

== Former simulcast frequencies ==
=== WFEX ===
In December 1999, 92.1 WFEX of Peterborough, New Hampshire, began simulcasting 101.7 WFNX. Previously WFEX was WNHQ, simulcasting 105.5 WJYY of Concord, New Hampshire.

WFEX was sold to Blount Communications Group, which uses it to simulcast WDER, a Christian religious station out of Derry, New Hampshire, as WDER-FM.

=== WPHX ===
On July 21, 1999, 92.1 WPHX-FM of Sanford, Maine, began simulcasting of 101.7 WFNX. Previous to the simulcast, WPHX-FM was WCDQ, playing classic rock as Mount Rialto Radio. The WFNX simulcast on WPHX-FM ended in August 2011, when WPHX-FM switched to a simulcast of WXEX 1540 AM, Exeter, New Hampshire, under the WXEX-FM calls. The station had a Sanford sister station on 1220 AM, also using the WPHX callsign. It was on the air until August 2010, when the transmitter failed, and remained off until June 2011. Prior to that, the station served as ESPN Radio affiliate. Following WPHX-FM's sale, WPHX (AM) took on simulcasting WFNX until Port Broadcasting bought the AM station in 2012 and changed its call sign to WWSF.

=== WWRX ===
From 2000 to 2003 and again briefly in 2004, WFNX was simulcast on 103.7 WWRX-FM in Westerly, Rhode Island, a facility that, as WVEI-FM, now simulcasts another Boston radio station, WEEI-FM. For a short time in 2003, WWRX broadcast its own local programming of alternative rock, with local DJs, though retaining the "FNX" branding. Phoenix Media/Communications Group sold the station to Entercom in March 2004 and reverted to simulcasting WFNX until the transition took effect in April.

== Bibliography ==
- 1992 Broadcasting & Cable Marketplace, page A-165
