= WXKS (AM) =

Radio station in Newton, Massachusetts

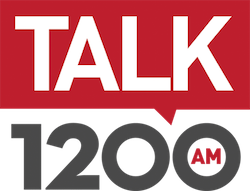
- Newton, Massachusetts; United States
- Broadcast area: Greater Boston
- Frequency: 1200 kHz
- Branding: Talk 1200

Programming
- Format: Conservative talk radio
- Affiliations: Fox News Radio; Compass Media Networks; Premiere Networks; Westwood One

Ownership
- Owner: iHeartMedia; (iHM Licenses, LLC)
- Sister stations: WBWL; WBZ; WJMN; WRKO; WXKS-FM; WZLX; WZRM

History
- First air date: April 21, 1947
- Former call signs: WKOX (1947–2010)
- Former frequencies: 1190 kHz (1947–1985)
- Call sign meaning: Taken from sister station WXKS-FM; previously used on the former WXKS (1430 AM) in Everett, now WKOX (AM)

Technical information
- Licensing authority: FCC
- Facility ID: 20441
- Class: B
- Power: 50,000 watts
- Transmitter coordinates: 42°17′20.35″N 71°11′19.2″W
- Repeater: 100.7 WZLX-HD3 (Boston)

Links
- Public license information: Public file; LMS
- Webcast: Listen live (via iHeartRadio)
- Website: talk1200boston.iheart.com

WXKS (1200 AM) – branded Talk 1200 – is a commercial conservative talk radio station licensed to Newton, Massachusetts, serving the Greater Boston area. Owned by iHeartMedia, WXKS serves as the Boston affiliate for Fox News Radio, The Glenn Beck Program, The Clay Travis and Buck Sexton Show, The Sean Hannity Show and The Mark Levin Show; and the home of syndicated personalities Bill Handel, Ron Wilson, Gary Sullivan and Leo Laporte. The WXKS studios are located in the Boston suburb of Medford, while the station transmitter resides in Newton. Besides its main analog transmission, WXKS streams online via iHeartRadio.

== History ==
=== WKOX (AM) ===
On April 21, 1947, the station signed on as WKOX, a daytime-only station on 1190 kHz in Framingham. WKOX would be paired with an FM adjunct, WKOX-FM 105.7, on February 10, 1960. Fairbanks Communications purchased WKOX and WKOX-FM in 1970. In 1985, WKOX switched frequencies to 1200 kHz and received authorization to broadcast around the clock. For many years, WKOX functioned as a full service station oriented towards the MetroWest region.

Following stints with satellite-fed oldies and talk radio, WKOX became a partial simulcast of its FM sister station, then known as country-formatted WCLB-FM 105.7, on March 1, 1993. The only deviation from this simulcast was morning drive, which continued to be programmed separately with a local talk show. That August, WKOX switched to ABC Radio/Satellite Music Network's "Real Country" format, featuring classic country to complement the more contemporary country sound on WCLB; the local morning news-talk program was again retained.

Another attempt at talk, including a show hosted by former WEEI (590 AM) and WRKO host Gene Burns, was made on October 2, 1995. By this point, WKOX had begun to orient itself to the Boston market as a whole rather than MetroWest. WKOX's talk format was largely replaced with brokered programming in October 1996, mostly consisting of ethnic and foreign language shows; by 1997, WKOX's daytime schedule largely featured programming in creole and Spanish, with some talk programming remaining in other time periods. Notably, contemporary Christian music station WJLT (1060 AM) leased out WKOX's overnight hours to extend its programming schedule, since WJLT was bound at the time to daytime-only operations; by 1999, the bulk of the station's daytime programming was also religious in nature, in Spanish.

As early as 1995, WKOX pursued options to upgrade its power and serve the entire Boston area. The FCC approved plans to have the station change its city of license to Newton and move its transmitter site to a site also utilized by WUNR, where it would operate at 50,000 watts. Community opposition delayed this series of moves for nearly 13 years, and also significantly delayed attempts by Fairbanks Communications to divest WKOX. While Westinghouse Broadcasting and B-Mass Holding Company had expressed interest, by 1998, WKOX was the last remaining radio station in the Fairbanks portfolio. After Richard M. Fairbanks died in August 2000, WKOX was finally sold to Clear Channel Communications (now iHeartMedia) in early 2001.

The brokered format, by then primarily consisting of Spanish-language religious programming, was retained until 2004, when the station began simulcasting a progressive talk radio format with the original WXKS (1430 AM). Both stations switched to a Spanish tropical format, branded as "Rumba", on December 21, 2006. WKOX completed the transmitter and city of license move to Newton in the fall of 2008, and began broadcasting at 50,000 watts full-time in April 2009. On September 4, WXKS (1430 AM) broke from the WKOX simulcast and flipped to a Spanish adult hits format, branded as "Mia 1430".

=== WXKS (2010–present) ===
"Rush Radio 1200" logo.

Clear Channel announced in January 2010 that WKOX would once again change to a talk format in April; the launch was stepped up to March 8 after WRKO dropped The Rush Limbaugh Show from its line-up. With this format change, WKOX changed call letters to WXKS on March 1; WXKS (1430 AM) concurrently changed its calls to WKOX. Coast to Coast AM was the first talk program to air on the station, moving from WRKO in February 2010, several weeks before the full format change. "Rumba" programming ceased on March 5, at which time the station began stunting. For the first year of the talk format, WXKS was branded as "Rush Radio 1200", named for Limbaugh; similar branding was utilized at WRNO-FM in New Orleans, WRDU in Raleigh-Durham, and WPTI in Greensboro, North Carolina. Less than a year later, on February 28, 2011, WXKS re-branded itself as "Talk 1200 Boston."

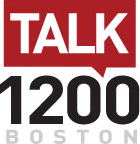
Original "Talk 1200 Boston" logo.

Local hosts Jeff Katz and Jay Severin were both dismissed from WXKS on August 6, 2012; Katz was reassigned to then-co-owned WRVA in Richmond, Virginia, while Severin joined TheBlaze Radio Network. That same day, both Rush Limbaugh and Coast to Coast AM returned to WRKO's lineup. For the next four days, WXKS continued with the remainder of its syndicated programming before stunting with a 10-minute loop of political gaffes; this led into a format switch to comedy radio that August 13 as the Boston affiliate for 24/7 Comedy Radio. Branded "Matty's Comedy 1200" in honor of WXKS-FM morning host Matt Siegel—who announced the launch on both his show and on WXKS—the comedy format began with a routine from Cambridge native Dane Cook.

"Bloomberg 1200" logo.

On February 27, 2013, Clear Channel announced that WXKS would begin to carry Bloomberg Radio's financial news and information programming as of March 1. The comedy format continued on the second HD Radio subchannel of WXKS-FM until December 2013. The simulcast of 1200 AM, which had previously been on 107.9-HD2, moved to the HD2 subchannel of WJMN, replacing old-school hip hop. In September 2013, WXKS began broadcasting Harvard University football, men's hockey, and men's basketball games. The broadcasts were produced by an independent packager who paid for the airtime.

Bloomberg L.P. announced on July 3, 2017, that the following day, Bloomberg Radio would move its programming to WRCA and its FM translator at 106.1 MHz. WXKS continued to simulcast the Bloomberg programming for several months.

After Bloomberg's local marketing agreement with WXKS ended on March 1, 2018, the station took on the conservative talk programming that had been on WKOX, including Rush Limbaugh. WXKS also returned to the "Talk 1200" branding. WKOX returned to a tropical music format and was moved into a trust ownership, and would later eventually donated to Delmarva Educational Association.

The simulcast on WJMN's HD2 channel ended in November 2018, when it was replaced with iHeartMedia's "Breeze" soft adult contemporary programming. In September 2021, WXKS reappeared on the HD Radio dial, this time on the third sub-channel of sister station WZLX, replacing K-Love.

Initially, during its conservative talk format, WXKS carried some programming from Fox Sports Radio, including its morning show. On November 1, 2021, the station replaced Fox Sports Radio's 2 Pros and A Cup of Joe with a regionally-syndicated program hosted by Jim Polito, produced by Worcester sister station WTAG.
