= WKOX (AM) =

Radio station in Everett, Massachusetts

- Everett, Massachusetts; United States
- Broadcast area: Greater Boston
- Frequency: 1430 kHz
- Branding: La Verdad Boston

Programming
- Language: Spanish
- Format: Christian radio

Ownership
- Owner: Delmarva Educational Association
- Operator: Global Ministries Foundation

History
- First air date: January 20, 1952
- Former call signs: WHIL (1952–1973); WWEL (1973–1979); WXKS (1979–2010)
- Call sign meaning: Carried over from the former WKOX (1200 AM)

Technical information
- Licensing authority: FCC
- Facility ID: 53964
- Class: D
- Power: 2,500 watts (day); 26 watts (night)
- Transmitter coordinates: 42°26′9.35″N 70°59′33.18″W

Links
- Public license information: Public file; LMS

WKOX (1430 AM, "La Verdad Boston") is a commercial radio station licensed to Everett, Massachusetts, United States, serving Greater Boston. Owned by the Delmarva Educational Association, it broadcasts a Spanish-language Christian radio format from a transmitter in Saugus.

== History ==
The station signed on January 20, 1952, as WHIL, a daytime-only station based in Medford, Massachusetts. After an attempt to program pop music, the station flipped to country music in the 1960s, and added an FM station, WHIL-FM 107.9, which simulcast the AM during the day and continued with similar programming at night.

In 1972, the FM was changed from WHIL-FM to WWEL-FM, and both stations switched to a format of instrumental versions of pop hits and show tunes known as beautiful music, with the stations simulcast most of the day. On August 28, 1973, WHIL became WWEL, to match the FM station's call sign.

In January 1979, after the stations were sold, the call letters were changed to WXKS and WXKS-FM, with the "KS" in the call letters representing the word "Kiss". Both stations launched a disco format (mostly, but not completely, simulcast), with the FM ("Kiss 108") soon becoming one of Boston's most popular radio stations, although the AM had very few listeners. The FM side eventually made a very successful transition from disco to mainstream top 40; by that time, however, the AM no longer had the same format as the FM.

From December 31, 1979, until October 4, 2004, WXKS was an adult standards-format station, which at first carried the Music of Your Life format, with the music played by local personalities. For a time in the 1980s, WXKS became quite successful, especially among older listeners, in spite of its daytime status. Later, WXKS went to 24-hours-a-day operation and broadcast programming from both the Music of Your Life and AM Only/America's Best Music satellite networks, along with a local morning show during the early 2000s.

On October 4, 2004, WXKS made a format change to liberal talk, for the most part carrying programming from the Air America radio network. Since the WXKS nighttime signal is very directional, sister station WKOX (1200 AM) in Framingham also broadcast the same programming.

At noon on December 21, 2006, the stations dropped the progressive talk format in favor of a Spanish tropical format called "Rumba".

On September 4, 2009, WXKS split from the simulcast with WKOX and flipped to Spanish-language Top 40, branded "Mia 1430", using the format from Premium Choice. The two stations then swapped call letters on March 1, 2010, as part of 1200 AM's transition to a conservative talk format.

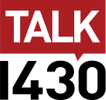
Logo as "Talk 1430", from June 2015 through February 2018.

The conservative talk format that had been on WXKS reappeared on WKOX in 2015. WXKS had given up the format in 2012, and the two stations that had bought the programming that had been on WXKS, WRKO (The Rush Limbaugh Show) and WMEX (The Sean Hannity Show and the Glenn Beck Radio Program), discontinued the shows in two separate moves in 2015. WKOX confirmed the news on June 25, 2015, with the station opting for the Premiere Networks conservative talk lineup (which, in addition to Hannity, Limbaugh, and Beck's programs, included Buck Sexton and Jason Lewis) plus a tape-delayed broadcast of Westwood One's The Mark Levin Show; overnight and morning drive programming was supplied by Fox Sports Radio. While conservative talk shows were on the air, national news from Fox News Radio was heard at the beginning of each hour.

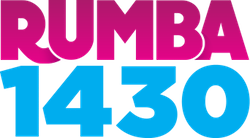
Logo as "Rumba 1430", from February 2018 through August 2020.

On November 1, 2017, iHeartMedia disclosed that it was selling WKOX to comply with Federal Communications Commission (FCC) ownership limits following its proposed acquisition of WBZ, WRKO, WKAF, and WZLX. The move followed the merger of CBS Radio and Entercom, with both companies needing to divest stations to different owners to meet ownership limits and revenue concentration limits set by the FCC and the Department of Justice. The divestment into the trust was completed on December 19. On March 1, 2018, iHeartMedia moved the conservative talk format back to WXKS; WKOX then switched to a Spanish-language hit music format and revived the "Rumba" branding.

On April 30, 2020, iHeartMedia announced that the trust would be donating WKOX to Delmarva Educational Association. On August 11, 2020, after the sale closed, WKOX flipped to gospel music as "1430 The Light". iHeart would revive the "Rumba" branding and Spanish CHR format on WKAF (now WZRM) in May 2021. On March 29, 2021, WKOX changed its format to Spanish Christian, branded as "Buenas Nuevas Radio". It eventually rebranded as "La Verdad Radio".

== HD Radio ==
WKOX is currently broadcasting in HD Radio. The station also broadcast on HD2 signal of sister station WBWL until December 19, 2017.
