= WBGB (FM) =

Adult hits radio station in Boston

- Boston, Massachusetts; United States
- Broadcast area: Greater Boston
- Frequency: 103.3 MHz (HD Radio)
- Branding: Big 103

Programming
- Language: English
- Format: Adult hits
- Subchannels: HD2: Channel Q

Ownership
- Owner: Audacy, Inc.; (Audacy License, LLC)
- Sister stations: WEEI; WEEI-FM; WMJX; WVEI; WBMX

History
- First air date: July 1948
- Former call signs: WEEI-FM (1948–1983); WHTT (1983–1986); WMRQ (1986–1987); WODS (1987–2020)
- Call sign meaning: "Big Boston"

Technical information
- Licensing authority: FCC
- Facility ID: 9639
- Class: B
- ERP: 8,700 watts
- HAAT: 351 meters (1,152 ft)
- Transmitter coordinates: 42°18′27.7″N 71°13′24.9″W

Links
- Public license information: Public file; LMS
- Webcast: Listen live (via Audacy)
- Website: www.audacy.com/big103boston

WBGB (103.3 MHz) – branded as Big 103 – is a commercial adult hits FM radio station licensed to Boston, Massachusetts. Owned by Audacy, Inc., the station serves Greater Boston. The WBGB studios are located in the Boston neighborhood of Brighton, while the station's transmitter resides in nearby Newton. Besides a standard analog transmission, WBGB broadcasts over two HD Radio channels, and is available online via Audacy.

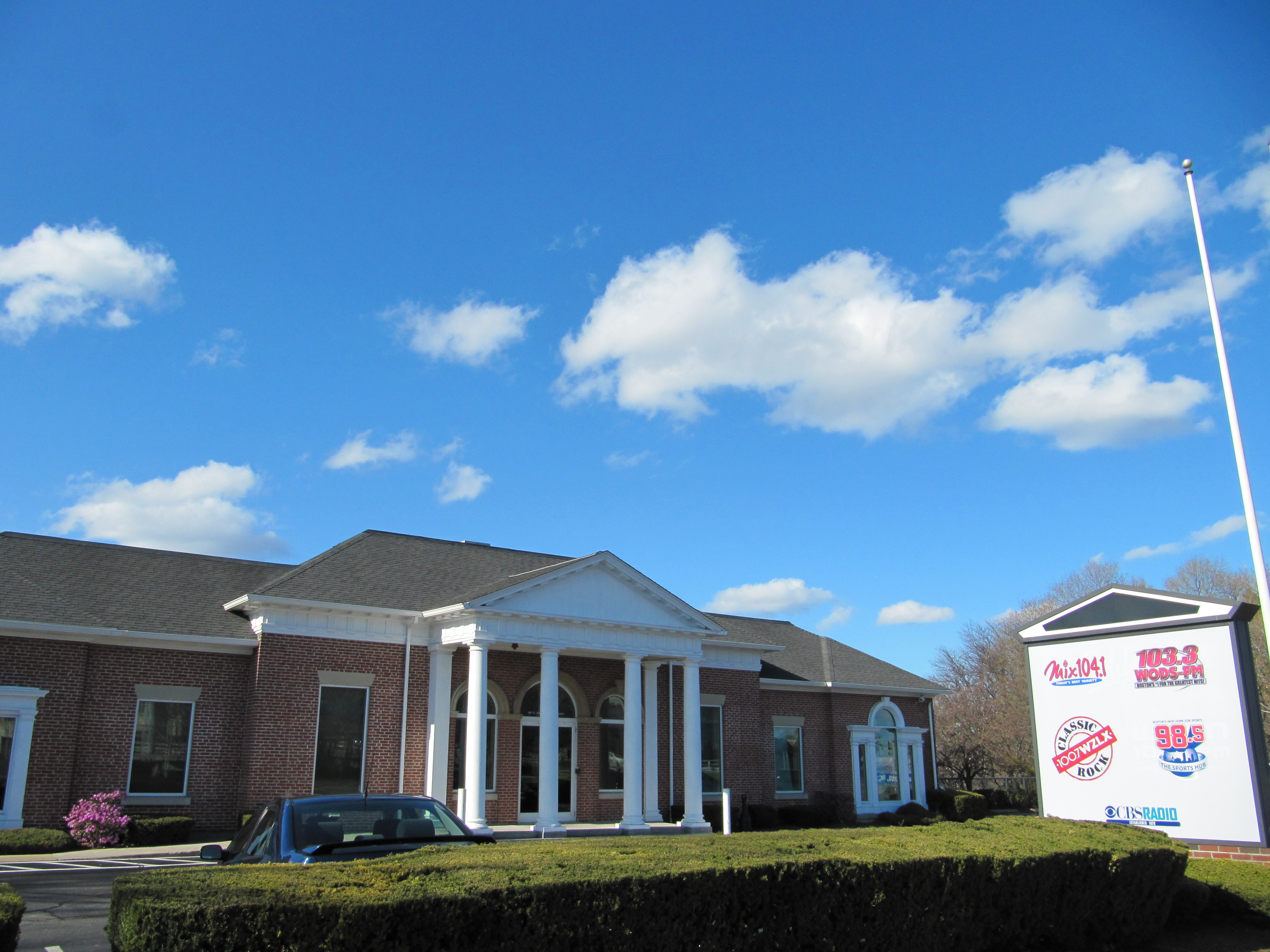
Former CBS Radio Boston studios in 2011

== History ==
=== WEEI-FM (103.3) ===
The station signed on the air in July 1948 as WEEI-FM, under the ownership of CBS. In its early years, it mainly simulcast co-owned WEEI (590 AM). Beginning in 1965, WEEI-FM began carrying "The Young Sound", an easy listening format focusing on instrumental versions of recent pop tunes, which aired on many of CBS's FM owned-and-operated stations. By 1969, "The Young Sound" had evolved to an automated Top 40/AOR hybrid format, with voice tracked announcements by Dick Provost. In late 1972, WEEI-FM flipped to adult contemporary, then evolved into its famous "Soft Rock" format in 1977, which remained in place until 1983. During the Soft Rock years, WEEI-FM's playlist was limited to the softer hits of rock-oriented artists, artists heard only on Top 40 stations were not aired.

=== First Top 40 era ===
By 1981, all of the other owned-and-operated CBS FM radio stations were carrying the "Hot Hits" format, supervised by programmer Mike Joseph, except for WCBS-FM in New York City. Unlike its sister stations, though, WEEI-FM played hits from the past several years as well as the hits of the current day. At midnight on March 9, 1983, WEEI-FM changed its call sign to WHTT, and re-branded as "HitRadio 103" and then "Power 103". The first song under WHTT and their new format was "Back On The Chain Gang" by The Pretenders. WHTT would compete against WXKS-FM and WZOU for the next three years.

WHTT continued with a Top 40 format until 7:00 p.m. on July 7, 1986, when, after playing "Don't You (Forget About Me)" by the Simple Minds, the station flipped to an adult rock format known as Boston's Quality Rock, playing a blend of softer album-oriented rock cuts, some pop songs and some eclectic smooth jazz, launching with "FM (No Static at All)" by Steely Dan. The station's call sign changed to WMRQ, branded on-air as "Q-103". The air staff stayed on from WHTT initially, though most gradually left over the next year.

=== Oldies era ===
On October 7, 1987, after playing "Better Things" by the Kinks, the station switched to an oldies format, playing the rock and roll Hits from 1955 to 1969, and was branded as "Oldies 103". The first song on "Oldies 103" was "Fun Fun Fun" by The Beach Boys. The station had a very deep playlist, playing a larger number of songs than most oldies stations. The station's call letters were soon changed to WODS to reflect the oldies format. WMRQ's airstaff stayed with the station despite the format change, and a couple of people continued at the station right up to the station's final day in 2012. By 1989, WODS was also playing a very limited amount of music from the early 1970s up to 1972 mixed with the 1950s and 1960s.

As time went on, WODS added more 1970s' music but continued to focus on the 1960s and still played a considerable number of pre-1964 oldies. In the late 1990s, the station rebranded as "Oldies 103.3". In 2001, WODS began to move away from 1950s' music. The station added more late 1970s' songs and a few 1980s' hits. In 2001, Little Walter's Time Machine was replaced with the Boston-based syndicated show The Lost 45s, the program's host Barry Scott stayed with the station until WODS's final day, when he became the first to be hired away by long-time rival WROR-FM. Scott also hosted the long-running "Saturday Night Party" show featuring dance and party hits, from 2003 to 2012. In 2002, WODS eliminated most of the pre-64 oldies. When new Program Director Jon Zellner arrived in 2004, the station was focusing on 1964 to 1979 with just a handful of pre-1964 oldies and early ‘80s songs mixed in.

In 2005, there were rumors CBS was planning to switch one of its Boston FM stations to adult hits as "Jack FM" which had been successful in a number of other radio markets, WODS was one of those stations under consideration, similar oldies stations in Chicago, Baltimore, and New York had flipped at the same time. These rumors were rendered moot when Entercom-owned WQSX (93.7 FM) switched to adult hits as "93.7 Mike FM" instead on April 14, 2005.

Prior to the 1990s, WODS only played moderate amounts of Christmas music during the holiday season and did not go wall to wall, even on Christmas Day. Beginning in the early 1990s, the station began wall to wall Christmas music on Christmas Eve and continued until Christmas evening. Beginning in 2003, WODS played holiday music from a week before Thanksgiving until Christmas Day. However, in 2007, it started its Christmas music on Monday November 12, and in 2008, it commenced on Thursday, November 6, the earliest it has ever been. This tradition was continued in 2009 with Christmas music playing on Friday, November 13, and it started on Thursday, November 18 in 2010. In 2011, Christmas music began on Friday, November 11.

WODS added HD Radio operations in 2009. Its second HD channel carried a "soft rock" format known as "The Cove", and the HD3 channel carried a simulcast of WBZ. After the sign on of "98.5 The Sports Hub" on August 13, 2009, the simulcast moved to the HD3 channel of 98.5, while 103.3 HD3 flipped to Christian rock, branded as "Mercy Rock: The Christian Rock of Boston".

In 2007, WODS added Casey Kasem's American Top 40: The '70s Saturday nights at 11:00 p.m. and The Wolfman Jack Show Sunday nights at 11:00 p.m. In October 2008, WODS switched nights for the two shows and added a second airing of "AT40:70s" on Sunday mornings at 10:00 a.m. The 2-hour version (second and third hours) played in the morning and the entire 3-hour version played at night. In 2009, the morning broadcast was dropped with AT40:70s airing only Sundays at midnight.

In 2008, WODS added Tom Kent's nationally syndicated show weeknights from 7:00 p.m. to 10:00 p.m. As a result, the Top 20 Countdown, a Thursday night staple on WODS for many years, was moved to Saturdays from 7:00 a.m. to 9:00 a.m. with Patrick Callahan as host as of October 4, 2008. The Top 20 Countdown was originally known as the Thursday Night Countdown, with hosts including Sandy Benson, Patrick Callahan and J.J. Wright. Tom Kent's syndicated show only lasted a few months and was replaced with local programming again.

In October 2009, WODS changed its station branding from "Oldies 103.3" to "103.3 WODS". At that point, WODS began focusing on hits from 1970 to 1989, with only a few 1960s songs per hour. The station also played an occasional 1990s song as well. However, this adjustment did more to hurt than help in the ratings.

Over the years, WODS produced numerous free summer concerts starting at the steps of Boston City Hall Plaza in 1988 before moving to the larger Hatch Memorial Shell in May 1996. Acts who have performed as part of the concert series include Chubby Checker (August 11, 1990), Paul Revere & the Raiders (August 4, 1990), The Monkees, Peter Cetera, Bobby Vee (July 7, 1990), Gary Puckett & The Union Gap (July 14, 1990), The Cadillacs & The Chiffons (both July 21, 1990), The Jive Five & The Del-Vikings (both July 28, 1990), and dozens more.

The final concert lineup during the summer of 2012 included Jefferson Starship, Burton Cummings (of The Guess Who) and Rick Springfield.

=== Notable WODS on-air personalities ===
- Frank Kingston Smith
- Barry Scott of The Lost 45s

=== Second Top 40 era ===
On June 27, 2012, CBS announced that the station would flip back to Top 40 as "103.3 AMP Radio" the following day at Noon. Within hours of the announcement, the air staff was laid off and the station began to run jockless, with recorded liners thanking loyal listeners of WODS and advising them that "Boston's Greatest Hits" would move to its HD2 subchannel. One of the now-unemployed DJs, Paula Street (who had been with WODS since February 1988), confirmed on the Radio-Info Boston message board that a goodbye show for the format would happen before the flip at Noon.

The last show of The Breakfast Club with John Laurenti and Karen Blake took place on June 28, 2012, concluding with one "last song" by them. Jay Gordon, Barry Scott, and both Paula Street and J.J. Wright each followed on-air, playing their last respective songs for WODS, ending with Street and Wright's selection to sign off the program, "Fun Fun Fun" by The Beach Boys, WODS' first song as an oldies station. Following a jockless half-hour with songs either with "time" or "change" in the title or overall theme (ending with "Last Dance" by Boston native Donna Summer), the station went into a five-minute long introductory montage, culminating with the launch of "AMP Radio" at 12:00 p.m., with "Where Have You Been" by Rihanna being the first song played.

As part of the format change, the classic hits format moved to WODS-HD2, displacing "The Cove". WODS-HD3 played Christmas music during the 2012 holiday season, replacing the "Mercy Rock" format, which moved to WBMX-HD3; it would be replaced with a revived "Cove" that following January.

Former Elvis Duran and the Morning Show co-host TJ Taormina became the host of the station's morning drive show on April 1, 2013.

On February 2, 2017, CBS Radio announced it would merge with Entercom (which locally owned WEEI, WEEI-FM, WRKO, WKAF, and WAAF). WODS, WBMX, WEEI-AM-FM and WAAF were retained by Entercom, while sister stations WBZ and WZLX, as well as WKAF and WRKO, were spun off to iHeartMedia (WBZ-FM was then traded to Beasley Broadcast Group in exchange for WMJX). The merger was approved on November 9, 2017, and was consummated on November 17.

On February 26, 2019, it was reported that Entercom was flipping HD channels in six markets, including WODS-HD2 (replacing the oldies/classic hits format), to its "Channel Q" network, which carries a talk and dance music format aimed at the LGBTQ community. Morning host TJ Taormina was let go by Entercom on April 3, 2020, due to budget cuts resulting from the COVID-19 pandemic. "Producer Matt" Shearer from The TJ Show temporarily anchored mornings for the remainder of the top 40 format's run.

=== Big 103 ===
At 10:00 a.m. on May 28, 2020, after playing "Happier" by Marshmello and Bastille, WODS flipped to adult hits, branded as "Big 103, Music Unleashed". The new format features a playlist focusing on music from the 1970s through the 2000s. The first song on "Big" was "Welcome to the Jungle" by Guns N' Roses. On June 4, 2020, WODS changed its call letters to WBGB; concurrently, the former WODS call letters were moved to a sister station in West Hazleton, Pennsylvania. WBGB is voiced by Howard Cogan, the same voiceover talent heard on Jack FM radio stations nationwide, such as Audacy sister station KCBS-FM in Los Angeles.
