= WFNX (FM) =

- Grand Marais, Minnesota; United States
- Broadcast area: North Shore (Lake Superior)
- Frequency: 95.3 MHz
- Branding: 95.3 The Otter

Programming
- Language: English
- Format: Defunct (was adult album alternative)

Ownership
- Owner: Shire & Shore Communications, LLC.

History
- First air date: 1998 (as WXXZ)
- Last air date: January 23, 2024
- Former call signs: KANQ (1995–1996); WXXZ (1996–2018); WVVE (2018–2020)
- Call sign meaning: The WFNX call sign once belonged to a modern Rock station in Boston from 1983 to 2012, now known as WBWL; the call sign was acquired by WVVE when 99.9 in Boston was acquired by the Educational Media Foundation and their call sign was changed from WFNX to WKMY

Technical information
- Licensing authority: FCC
- Facility ID: 18531
- Class: C1
- ERP: 63,000 watts
- HAAT: 209 meters (686 ft)
- Transmitter coordinates: 47°44′56″N 90°21′28″W

Links
- Public license information: Public file; LMS

WFNX (95.3 FM; "The Otter") was a commercial FM radio station licensed to Grand Marais, Minnesota, United States, and serving the North Shore region. The station aired an adult album alternative format. WFNX broadcast with an ERP of 63,000 watts.

== History ==
As WXXZ, this station along with KAOD (106.7 FM) in Babbitt, formerly simulcast KQDS-FM from Duluth. In 2017, Midwest Communications sold W288AI (Ely), WXXZ, and KAOD to Aurora Broadcasting LLC.

In 2017, WXXZ and KAOD both changed their call signs. WXXZ changed its call sign to WVVE, and KOAD changed its call sign to KZJZ.

In May 2018, after stunting, WVVE and KZJZ launched an adult album alternative format branded as "Radio North Of Ordinary".

In June 2019, Shire & Shore Communications announced that it would sell WVVE to Zoe Communications, Inc, however the transaction was never consummated.

On September 16, 2019, WVVE returned to air simulcasting WHRY, an oldies station in Hurley, Wisconsin. Its call sign was changed to WFNX on June 15, 2020.

In March 2021, the radio station, now operating as 95.3 The Otter, re-committed to its AAA format as a local, independent broadcasting company serving the Minnesota North Shore.

WFNX returned its license to the Federal Communications Commission (FCC) on January 23, 2024. The FCC cancelled it on January 25, 2024.

On November 10, 2025, FM Jazz 91.7 added the call letters WVVE FM as a very low power community radio station in Miami Beach, Florida, playing smooth jazz since Nov. 10, 2019.

== Sources ==
- northpine.com
- New AAA Radio Station Launches In Northeastern Minnesota
- fccinfo.com
- Boreal.org
