= WXKS-FM =

- Medford, Massachusetts; United States
- Broadcast area: Greater Boston
- Frequency: 107.9 MHz (HD Radio)
- Branding: Kiss 108 (pronounced "Kiss One-Oh-Eight")

Programming
- Language: English
- Format: Contemporary hit radio
- Subchannels: HD2: WBZ simulcast (news/talk)
- Affiliations: Premiere Networks

Ownership
- Owner: iHeartMedia; (iHM Licenses, LLC)
- Sister stations: WBWL; WBZ; WJMN; WXKS; WZLX; WZRM

History
- First air date: September 1, 1960
- Former call signs: WHIL-FM (1959); WISK (1959–1961); WHIL-FM (1961–1972); WWEL (1972–1973); WWEL-FM (1973–1979)
- Call sign meaning: Kiss-FM

Technical information
- Licensing authority: FCC
- Facility ID: 53965
- Class: B
- ERP: 20,500 watts
- HAAT: 235 meters (771 ft)
- Transmitter coordinates: 42°20′50.4″N 71°4′57.2″W

Links
- Public license information: Public file; LMS
- Webcast: Listen live (via iHeartRadio)
- Website: kiss108.iheart.com

WXKS-FM (107.9 MHz), branded Kiss 108, is a commercial contemporary hit radio station licensed to serve Medford, Massachusetts, and covering Greater Boston. Owned by iHeartMedia, the WXKS-FM studios are in Medford and the station transmits from atop the Prudential Tower in Downtown Boston.

== History ==
The station first went on the air September 1, 1960, as WHIL-FM, a simulcast of sister station WHIL (now WKOX), and broadcasting its programming after sunset when WHIL signed off. For much of the 1960s, WHIL and WHIL-FM were country music stations, but in late 1972, both stations switched to beautiful music as WWEL and WWEL-FM ("Well"). The calls referred to Wellington Square in Medford, where the station studios were located.

Despite moving the FM transmitter to the Prudential Tower in 1972, WWEL-FM was not very successful as a beautiful music station. In 1978, WWEL-FM broadcast the night games of the Boston Red Sox as their flagship station (WITS, now WMEX) delivered a poor night signal in much of Metro Boston. The stations were sold to Heftel Communications, operated by Cecil Heftel, in early 1979. Heftel changed the callsign to WXKS, adopted "Kiss 108" as an identity, and changed to a disco format in January 1979.

Sunny Joe White, a young programmer (who had previously programmed WILD in Boston), came aboard at "Kiss 108" upon its shift to disco and had much to do with the station's early success. At the end of 1979, WXKS' AM station dropped disco to adopt an adult standards format, while WXKS-FM slowly evolved into urban contemporary when disco's popularity crashed. By the end of 1981 and into early 1982, the station evolved into a Top 40/CHR with a heavy rhythmic/R&B/dance direction under the guidance of White. WXKS-FM, in turn, became one of the most influential Top 40 stations in the nation, in part due to their reputation for breaking songs that did not fit the traditional Top 40/CHR model, and given that Boston lacked an urban contemporary FM outlet during this period (since WILD was an AM daytimer), it was not afraid to play songs from that genre. (The genre would later become the format now known as rhythmic contemporary, which is now the current format of sister station WJMN.) With WXKS leaning towards a rhythmic direction at the time, more mainstream titles were heard in the market on WVBF-FM, WROR-FM, and WEEI-FM. In December 1982, WXKS-FM shifted to a more mainstream Top 40 format. WXKS-FM would compete against WEEI-FM (later WHTT) and WZOU (both competitors would later change formats; WHTT dropped the format in 1986 (though what would become WODS would again program a Top 40/CHR from 2012 to 2020), while WZOU changed formats and became WJMN in 1993). In 1984, WXKS became an affiliate of Scott Shannon's Rockin' America Top 30 Countdown, as well as the Rick Dees Weekly Top 40.

In June 1982, Pyramid Broadcasting, headed by station general manager Rich Balsbaugh, bought the station from Heftel.

In 1987, White asked Boston icon John Garabedian (who previously owned, programmed and DJ'd on WMEX, WBCN, and V66/WVJV-TV) to do a weekend shift. Garabedian proposed the idea of a live, nationally syndicated, all-request show called Open House Party for Saturday and Sunday nights. It was the first of its kind and quickly spread to over 200 radio stations over the next 30 years. WXKS-FM was the show's flagship station until the station dropped the program in 2007, along with most other iHeartMedia stations (then-Clear Channel) because of a company policy that ultimately banned syndicated programming not produced in-house, though Open House Party consistently had the highest ratings of any show on their stations.

In January 1996, Evergreen Media bought the station. On February 9, 1996, sister station WYNY in New York City simulcast WXKS-FM as part of a week-long stunt of simulcasting sister stations nationwide before flipping formats to rhythmic adult contemporary the following day as WKTU. In September 1997, Evergreen merged with Chancellor Media. After another merger, WXKS was bought by Clear Channel Communications, now known as iHeartMedia, in August 2000.

From January 14, 2008, until August 2009, WXKS-FM's programming was simulcast on WSKX in York, Maine. After ending the simulcast, WSKX continued to offer a top 40 format until 2012.

== Programming ==
"Kiss 108" is one of the United States and New England's most prominent top 40 stations, notable primarily for its annual Kiss Concert, which draws some of the best-known names in the pop music business to Mansfield's Xfinity Center concert venue each spring. From January 12, 1981, until his retirement in May 2022, morning DJ Matt Siegel was a fixture on the Boston airwaves and was briefly nationally syndicated during the late 1990s.

The "Kiss Top 30 Countdown" is a locally produced program on Kiss 108, hosted by DJ Billy Costa. The countdown once aired solely on Saturday mornings but is now broadcast twice each weekend, on Saturday mornings and Sunday nights.

== HD Radio ==
On January 27, 2006, WXKS-FM went live with an HD2 digital broadcast referred to by Clear Channel Communications (now iHeartMedia), who by then had acquired the station, as the "Artists' Channel". The broadcast was also available as an Internet radio station. It then went to a "new CHR" format before becoming a simulcast of WXKS in 2010. In August 2012, that station changed formats to all-comedy, with the HD2 channel following suit. When 1200 AM flipped to Bloomberg Radio in February 2013, the all-comedy format was retained on the HD2. However, in December of that year, the HD2 channel flipped to a simulcast of the dance format of sister station WEDX; when WEDX itself changed format on June 13, 2014, and became WBWL, the dance format, branded "Evolution 101.7", remained on the HD2. On December 19, 2017, "Evolution 101.7" was transferred to the HD2 channel of WBWL and WXKS-FM-HD2 began simulcasting WBZ, which iHeartMedia had recently acquired.

== Notable past personalities ==
- Carson Daly
- Dale Dorman
- John Garabedian
- J. J. Wright
- Skip Kelly
- Matt Siegel
- Jay Thomas
- Wendy Williams
