= Jon =

Name

- Gender: Male
- Language: English, Nordic

Origin
- Meaning: God has given

Other names
- Related names: Jhon, Johan, Johannes, John, Jón, Jonathan, Jonn, Jonni, Jonnie, Jonny, Yahya, Yehia

Jon is a masculine given name. It is often short for Jonathan. The name is spelled Jón in Iceland and on the Faroe Islands. In the Nordic countries, it is derived from Johannes.

== Notable people ==
- Jon Aaraas (born 1986), Norwegian ski jumper
- Jon Abbate (born 1985), American gridiron football player
- Jon Abbott, American media executive
- Jon Aberasturi (born 1989), Basque bicycle racer
- Jon Ramon Aboitiz (1948–2018), Filipino businessman
- Jon Abrahams (born 1977), American actor
- Jon Abrahamsen (born 1951), Norwegian footballer
- Jon Ackerson, American lawyer and politician
- Jon Adams, American folk musician
- Jon Adkins (born 1977), American baseball player
- Jon Agee (born 1960), American writer and illustrator
- Jon Agirre (born 1997), Spanish cyclist
- Jon E. Ahlquist (1944–2020), American molecular biologist and ornithologist
- Jon Akass (1933–1990), British journalist
- Jon Åker (1927–2013), Norwegian hospital director
- Jon Akin (born 1977), American soccer forward
- Jon Allen, multiple people
- Jon Almaas (born 1967), Norwegian TV host and actor
- Jon Alpert (born 1948), American journalist and documentary filmmaker
- Jon Olav Alstad (born 1968), Norwegian politician
- Jon Alston (born 1983), American film director, screenwriter, producer, and former football player
- Jon Charles Altman (born 1954), Australian anthropologist and economist
- Jon Amiel (born 1948), English film and television director
- Jon Anabo (born 1939), American gridiron football player
- Jon Ander, multiple people
- Jon Andersen, American professional wrestler
- Jon Øyvind Andersen, Norwegian black metal guitarist
- Jon Anderson, multiple people
- Jon Andrå (1888–1966), Norwegian politician
- Jon Andrews (born 1967), New Zealand cyclist and coach
- Jon Andrus, American physician
- Jon Angelucci (born 1975), Australian football player
- Jon Anik (born 1978), American sports commentator
- Jon Applebaum (born 1985), American politician and attorney
- Jon Appleton (1939–2022), American composer and teacher
- Jon Aramburu (born 2002), Venezuelan footballer
- Jon Arfstrom (1928–2015), American artist
- Jon Armstrong (born 1974), English speedway rider
- Jon Arnett (1935–2021), American handball player
- Jon Arthur (1918–1982), American entertainer
- Jon Asamoah (born 1988), American football player
- Jon Ashton (born 1982), English footballer
- Jon Ashton (footballer, born 1979)
- Jon Aspiazu (born 1962), Spanish footballer
- Jon C. Aster, American pathologist
- Jon Astley (born 1951), British record producer
- Jon Aston (born 1976), Wales international rugby league footballer
- Jon Atkinson (born 1968), English cricketer
- Jon Auer (born 1969), American musician
- Jon Jon Augustavo, American director
- Jon Aurtenetxe (born 1992), Spanish footballer
- Jon Avila (born 1985), Filipino actor
- Jon Avnet (born 1949), American film and television director, writer and producer
- Jon Awe (born 1980), American ice hockey player
- Jon Ayling (born 1967), English cricketer
- Jon Azkargorta (born 1963), Spanish rugby union player
- Jon B. (born 1974), American rhythm and blues singer
- Jon Audun Baar, Norwegian jazz drummer
- Jon Baddeley, auctioneer, broadcaster and lecturer
- Jon S. Baird (born 1972), Scottish film director
- Jon Robin Baitz (born 1961), American dramatist
- John Baker, multiple people
- Jon Bakero, multiple people
- Jon Bakhshi, American nightclub promoter
- Jon Bakken (born 1943), Norwegian politician
- Jon Fredrik Baksaas, chairman of GSMA
- Jon Baldwin (born 1989), American football player
- Jon Balke (born 1955), Norwegian jazz pianist
- Jon Ballantyne (born 1963), Canadian pianist and composer
- Jon Ballantyne (footballer) (born 1969), Australian rules footballer
- Jon A. Ballis (born 1970), law firm chairman
- Jon Bannenberg (1929–2002), Australian yacht designer
- Jon Mohammad Barakzai, Afghan former Guantanamo Bay detainee
- Jon Barinholtz (born 1979), American actor
- Jon Barkman (born 1979), Canadian ice hockey player
- Jon Barrenetxea (born 2000), Spanish cyclist
- Jon Barry (born 1969), American basketball player
- Jon Barwise (1942–2000), American mathematician, philosopher and logician
- Jon Bass, multiple people
- Jon Batiste (born 1986), American musician
- Jon Bauer (born 1977), Canadian singer
- Jon Bauman (born 1947), American singer
- Jon Bausor, British costume designer
- Jon Bautista (born 1995), Spanish footballer
- Jon Beare (1974–2023), Canadian rower
- Jon Beason (born 1985), American football player
- Jon Beavers (born 1984), American actor
- Jon Beck Shank (1919–1977), American poet
- Jon Becker (born 1972), American politician
- Jon Beckerman, American writer, director and producer
- Jon Beckwith (born 1935), American musicologist and geneticist
- Jon Beedle (born 1961), British guitarist and songwriter
- Jon Beekhuis (born 1960), American race car driver
- Jon Belaustegui (born 1979), Spanish handball player
- Jon Bell (born 1997), Jamaican footballer
- Jon Bell (filmmaker), Australian screenwriter and filmmaker, cowriter on Redfern Now
- Jon Bellion (born 1990), American singer, songwriter, and rapper
- Jon Belmont, American radio newscaster
- Jon L. Belsher, American physician, former chief of aerospace medicine
- Jon Benjamin, multiple people
- Jon Trondson Benkestok (c. 1530–1593), Norwegian nobleman
- Jon T. Benn (1935–2018), Hong Kong actor
- Jon Bennett (born 1965), American racing driver
- Jon Bentley, multiple people
- Jon Berkeley, Irish illustrator and author
- Jon Berle (1932–2010), Norwegian actor, dancer and choreographer
- Jon Bernad (born 1983), American artist
- Jon Berney (born 1976), Australian rower
- Jon Bernson, American singer-songwriter
- Jon Bernthal (born 1976), American actor
- Jon Berti (born 1990), American baseball player
- Jon Beswetherick (born 1978), English footballer
- Jon Beutjer (born 1980), American gridiron football player
- Jon Bevan (born 1967), English golfer
- Jon Bewers (born 1982), English footballer
- Jon Bilger (born 1969), New Zealand sailor
- Jon Billsberry, British psychologist
- Jon Bing (1944–2014), Norwegian writer and professor of law
- Jon Bingesser (born 1939), American football coach and school administrator
- Jon Birger, American journalist
- Jon Birkfeldt (born 1996), Swedish footballer
- Jon Blaalid (born 1947), Norwegian civil servant
- Jon Blackman (born 1975), American football player
- Jon Blair (born 1950), South African-born British film director and producer
- Jon Blais (1971–2007), American triathlete
- Jon Blake, multiple people
- Jon Bleby, British field hockey player
- Jon Frode Blichfeldt (born 1944), Norwegian psychologist
- Jon Bluming (1933–2018), Dutch martial artist
- Jon Blundy (born 1961), British petrologist
- Jon Boardman (born 1981), English footballer
- Jon Boden (born 1977), British singer, composer and musician
- Jon Boden (rugby union) (born 1978), English rugby league and rugby union player
- Jon Bogdanove (born 1958), American comics artist and writer
- Jon Eilert Bøgseth (born 1959), Norwegian ski jumper
- Jon Bois (born 1982), American sportswriter and video producer
- Jon Bokenkamp (born 1974), American writer and producer
- Jon Bolen, American professional wrestler and bodybuilder
- Jon Bon Jovi (born 1962), American singer, songwriter, guitarist, and actor, founder and frontman of the rock band Bon Jovi
- Jon Bond (born 1957), American businessperson
- Jon Bonné, American wine and food writer
- Jon Borchardt (born 1957), American football player
- Jon Bortey Noawy (born 1939), Ghanaian footballer
- Jon Bosak, creator of the XML specification
- Jon Bostic (born 1991), American football player
- Jon Bounds (born 1975), English writer
- Jon Boutcher, British police officer
- Jon Bowden (born 1963), English footballer
- Jon Bowermaster (born 1954), American journalist and oceans expert
- Jon Bradley (born 1981), American football player
- Jon Brady (born 1975), Australian soccer player and manager
- Jon Bramnick (born 1953), member of the New Jersey Senate
- Jon Brant (born 1955), American musician and business owner
- Jon Breakingbury (born 1982), Wales international rugby league footballer
- Jon Brennan (born 1981), Jersey rugby union player and footballer
- Jon Brent (born 1956), Zimbabwean cricketer
- Jon Brewer (born 1950), English film director
- Jon D. Brien (born 1970), American politician
- Jon Briggs (born 1965), British narrator
- Jon Brion (born 1963), American composer, singer, songwriter, and record producer
- Jon Jon Briones (born 1965), Filipino-American actor
- Jon Brittain, British playwright and director
- Jon Brittenum (1944–2022), American football player
- Jon Brockman (born 1987), American basketball player
- Jon Brooks, multiple people
- Jon Brower Minnoch (1941–1983), heaviest ever recorded human
- Jon Bru (born 1977), Spanish cyclist
- Jon Bruning (born 1969), 31st Attorney General of Nebraska
- Jon Brunt (born 1974), American curler
- Jon Bryant (born 1986), Canadian singer-songwriter
- Jon Bryant (rugby union) (born 1976), footballer
- Jon Budmayr (born 1990), American football player
- Jon Buller (born 1970), Canadian singer
- Jon Bumstead (born 1957), American politician
- Jon Bunch (1970–2016), American songwriter
- Jon Burge (1947–2018), Chicago police chief charged with misconduct
- Jon Burgerman, English artist
- Jon Burklo (born 1984), American soccer coach
- Jon G. Burns (born 1952), American politician
- Jon Burnside, Canadian politician
- Jon Burr (born 1953), American double bass player and author
- Jon Burton (born 1969), British video game designer
- Jon Buscemi (born 1975), Italian-American fashion designer
- Jon Busch (born 1976), American soccer player
- Jon Butcher (born 1955), American musician and songwriter
- Jon Butler (born 1940), American historian
- Jon Butterworth, Professor of Physics at University College London
- Jon Button (born 1971), American bassist
- Jon Byrd (born 1971), American guitarist
- Jon Byrne (born 1983), Australian baseball umpire
- Jon Callard (born 1966), England international rugby union player
- Jon Callas, American computer security expert
- Jon Caldara, American libertarian activist
- Jon Canter, English television comedy writer
- Jon Caramanica, American journalist and pop music critic
- Jon Card (1960–2024), German-born Canadian drummer
- Jon Cardella, chief executive officer and entrepreneur
- Jon Cardin (born 1970), American politician
- Jon Carey (born 1946), Canadian politician
- Jon Carin (born 1964), American musician, singer, songwriter and producer
- Jon Herwig Carlsen (1937–2022), Norwegian sports commentator
- Jon Carnoy, American writer and director
- Jon Carpenter, American politician
- Jon Carroll (born 1943), American journalist
- Jon Carsman (1944–1987), American painter
- Jon Carson (born 1991), Canadian politician
- Jon Carter, English DJ
- Jon Carter (American football) (born 1965)
- Jon Casey (born 1962), American ice hockey player
- Jon Cassar (born 1958), Maltese-Canadian director and producer
- Jon Castañares (1925–2015), Spanish politician and economist
- Jon Azkueta Castro, Basque romance author
- Jon Catler, American composer
- Jon Cattapan, Australian visual artist
- Jon R. Cavaiani (1943–2014), US Army Medal of Honor recipient
- Jon Cedar (1931–2011), American actor
- Jon Challinor (born 1980), English footballer
- Jon Champion (born 1965), British sports commentator
- Jon Chang Hyok, North Korean military intelligence officer
- Jon Chol-ho (born 1969), North Korean weightlifter
- Jon Christensen, multiple people
- Jon Christiano (born 1958), American ice hockey coach
- Jon Christos (born 1976), British singer
- Jon M. Chu (born 1979), American filmmaker
- Jon Cisky (born 1941), American politician
- Jon Claerbout, American geophysicist and seismologist
- Jon Clardy (born 1943), American chemist
- Jon Clark, multiple people
- Jon Clarke, multiple people
- Jon Clay (born 1963), English cyclist
- Jon Cleary (1917–2010), Australian writer
- Jon Cleary (musician) (born 1962), British-born R&B and funk musician
- Jon Clegg (born 1970), British comedian and impressionist
- Jon Clinch, American novelist
- Jon Coffelt (born 1963), American artist
- Jon Coffman (born 1973), American college basketball coach
- Jon Coghill (born 1971), Australian drummer
- Jonathan Cohen, multiple people
- Jon Cole, multiple people
- Jon Coleman (born 1975), American ice hockey player
- Jon Collins, American basketball player
- Jon R. Collins (1923–1987), American judge
- Jon Comer (1976–2019), American skateboarder
- Jon Comerford, Canadian casting director
- Jon Condo (born 1981), American football player
- Jon Condoret (1934–2010), American architect
- Jon Connolly (born 1981), Scottish footballer
- Jon Connor (born 1985), American rapper
- Jon Conrad, American politician
- Jon Conway (born 1977), American soccer player
- Jon Cooper, multiple people
- Jon Cor (born 1984), Canadian actor and author
- Jon Corbino (1905–1964), Italian-born American painter
- Jon Cornish (born 1984), Canadian gridiron football player
- Jon Corto (born 1984), American football player
- Jon Corzine (born 1947), American politician
- Jon Coulston (1957–2024), British archaeologist
- Jon Court (born 1960), American jockey
- Jon Courtenay (born 1973), English singer and comedian
- Jon Courtney, British musician
- Jon Coutlangus (born 1980), American baseball player
- Jon Cowan, American television producer and writer
- Jon Cowherd, American musician
- Jon Cox (politician), American politician
- Jon Cox (soccer) (born 1986), American soccer player
- Jon Cozart (born 1992), American YouTuber, musician and comedian
- Jon Craig (born 1957), British journalist
- Jon Craig (architect) (1942–2015), New Zealand architect
- Jon Russell Cring (born 1971), American film director
- Jon Crispin (born 1981), American basketball player
- Jon Crosby (born 1976), American musician
- Jon Cross (born 1979), American politician
- Jon Crossland, British designer and illustrator
- Jon Crowcroft (born 1957), British computer scientist
- Jon Cruddas (born 1962), British politician
- Jon Cryer (born 1965), American actor, director, producer, and writer
- Jon Cullen (born 1973), English footballer
- Jon Culshaw (born 1968), English actor, comedian, and impressionist
- Jon Cunliffe (born 1953), British civil servant
- Jon Curran (born 1987), American professional golfer
- Jon Cutler, multiple people
- Jon Cypher (born 1932), American actor
- Jon Dahl Tomasson (born 1976), Danish footballer
- Jon Georg Dale (born 1984), Norwegian politician
- John Daly, multiple people
- Jon Dalzell (born 1960), American-Israeli basketball player
- Jon Daniels (born 1977), American baseball executive
- Jon Danielsson (born 1963), Icelandic economist
- Jon F. Danilowicz, American diplomat
- Jon Dasilva (born 1963), British DJ and producer
- Jon Thares Davidann, United States-East Asian historian
- Jon Davidson (born 1970), English footballer
- Jon Davis, multiple people
- John Davison, multiple people
- Jon Day, British civil servant
- Jon Day (writer), British writer, critic and academic
- Jon Deak (born 1943), American classical composer
- Jon Debus (born 1958), American baseball player and manager
- Jon Decker (born 1966), American journalist
- Jon Deeble (born 1962), Australian baseball player and manager
- Jon Deeks (born 1951), English biostatistician
- Jon DeGuilio (born 1955), American judge
- Jon Delano, American journalist
- Jon Delos Reyes, Guamanian professional mixed martial artist
- Jon Denning (born 1987), American NASCAR driver
- Jon DeRosa (born 1978), American musician
- Jon Dette (born 1970), American drummer
- Jon P. Diamond, American businessman
- Jon Diebler (born 1988), American basketball player
- Jon Dietzen (born 1996), American football player
- Jon DiSalvatore (born 1981), American ice hockey player
- Jon Dooley (1946–2020), British racing driver
- Jon Dore (born 1975), Canadian comedian and actor
- Jon Dorenbos (born 1980), American football player and magician
- Jon Dorotich (born 1962), Australian rules footballer and television commentator
- Jon Dough (1962–2006), American pornographic actor
- Jon Douglas (1936–2010), American tennis and football player
- Jon Doust, comedian, writer and novelist from Western Australia
- Jon Drach (born c. 1981), American football coach
- Jon Draud (born 1938), American politician
- Jon Drenning (born 1965), American musician and songwriter
- Jon Drever (born 1979), British director, producer and screenwriter
- Jon Drew, Canadian musical artist
- Jon Drezner, American architect and designer
- Jon Drummond (born 1968), American Olympic sprinter
- Jon Dudas (born 1968), American lawyer
- Jon Dumbauld (born 1963), American football player
- Jon Dumbrill (born 1935), South African cricketer
- Jon Duncan (born 1975), British orienteering competitor
- Jon Dunkle (born 1960), American serial killer
- Jon Dunn (born 1981), American football player
- Jon Michael Dunn (1941–2021), American philosopher
- Jon Dunwell, American politician
- Jon Duplantier (born 1994), American baseball player
- Jon Durham (1965–2025), English footballer
- Jon Durket (born 1986), American baseball pitcher
- Jon Dybdahl (1942–2023), American theologian
- Jon Dyson (born 1971), English footballer
- Jon Eardley (1928–1991), American jazz trumpeter
- Jon Eberson (born 1953), Norwegian jazz guitarist and composer
- Jon Ebsworth (born 1978), British field hockey player
- Jon Echols (born 1979), American politician
- Jon Edgar, British sculptor
- Jon Edwards (born 1988), American baseball player
- Jon Ehrlich (born 1963), TV and film composer
- Jon Eikemo (1939–2025), Norwegian actor
- Jon Eivind Gullord (born 1958), Norwegian actor
- Jon Ekerold (born 1946), South African motorcycle racer
- Jon Ekstrand (born 1976), Swedish composer and film sound designer
- Jon Eley (born 1984), British speed skater
- Jon Elissalde (born 1992), French professional rugby union player
- Jon Ellingson (born 1948), American politician
- Jon Elmore (born 1995), American basketball player
- Jon Elrick (born 1983), New Zealand rugby union player
- Jon Elrod (born 1977), American attorney and politician
- Jon H. Else (born 1944), American documentary filmmaker
- Jon Elster (born 1940), Norwegian social and political theorist
- Jon Embree (born 1965), American football player and coach
- Jon Engen (1957–2018), American skier
- Jon Engen-Helgheim (born 1981), Norwegian politician
- Jon English (1949–2016), Australian singer, songwriter, musician and actor
- Jon Entine (born 1952), American science writer and consultant
- Jon Epcar (born 1983), American drummer
- Jon Ergüin (born 1980), Spanish canoeist
- Jon Erice (born 1986), Spanish footballer
- Jon David Erickson (born 1969), American economist
- Jon Erikson (1954–2014), American swimmer
- Jon Eriksson Helland, Norwegian Hardanger violin maker
- Jon Erpenbach (born 1961), American politician
- Jon Errasti (born 1988), Spanish footballer
- Jon Erskine (born 1942), British motorcycle speedway rider
- Jon S. Eubanks, American politician
- Jon Evans (born 1973), Canadian novelist, journalist, adventure traveler, and software engineer
- Jon Everist, American video game composer
- Jon Ewing (1936–2014), Australian actor
- Jon Ewo (born 1957), Norwegian author
- Jon Eydmann (1968–2009), British music manager
- Jon Faddis (born 1953), American jazz trumpeter, composer, and conductor
- Jon Faine (born 1956), Australian radio presenter
- Jon Fält (born 1979), Swedish jazz drummer
- Jon Farriss (born 1961), Australian drummer
- Jon Fauer, American cinematographer
- Jon Fausty (1949–2023), American audio engineer and producer
- Jon Favreau (born 1966), American filmmaker and producer
- Jon Favreau (speechwriter) (born 1981), American political pundit
- Jon Harmon Feldman, American screenwriter and director
- Jon Feliciano (born 1992), American football player
- Jon Feltheimer (born 1951), American film producer
- Jon V. Ferrara (born 1960), American entrepreneur
- Jon Finch (1942–2012), English actor
- Jon Finer (born 1976), American diplomat
- Jon Finkel (born 1978), American magic: the gathering and professional poker player
- Jon Finlayson (1938–2012), Australian actor
- Jon Finn, American musician and guitarist
- Jon Paul Fiorentino (born 1975), Canadian writer, editor and professor
- Jon Fish (born 1962), American rower
- Jon Fisher (born 1972), entrepreneur
- Jon Fisher (rugby union) (born 1988), English rugby union player
- Jon Fishman (born 1965), American drummer
- Jon Fitch (born 1978), American mixed martial arts fighter
- Jon Fitch (politician) (1950–2011), American politician
- Jon Henrik Fjällgren (born 1987), Swedish-Sámi singer
- Jon Flanagan (born 1993), English footballer
- Jon Flatabø (1846–1930), Norwegian writer
- Jon Fogarty (born 1975), American racing driver
- Jon Fogarty (footballer) (born 1960), Australian rules footballer
- Jon Folkman (1938–1969), American mathematician
- Jon Fontas (born 1955), American ice hockey player
- Jon Foo (born 1982), British actor
- Jonathan Ford, multiple people
- Jon Foreman (born 1976), American musician
- Jon Fortt (born 1976), American journalist
- Jon Fosheim (1923–2004), American judge
- Jon Fosse (born 1959), Norwegian author and dramatist
- Jon S. Fossel (born 1942), American politician
- Jon Fossum (1923–2007), Norwegian orienteer and politician
- Jon Foster, multiple people
- Jon D. Fox (1947–2018), American politician
- Jon Francis (born 1964), American football player
- Jon Franklin (1942–2024), American writer
- Jon Fratelli (born 1979), Scottish musician, singer, and songwriter
- Jon André Fredriksen (born 1982), Norwegian footballer
- Jon Freeman, multiple people
- Jon French (born 1976), English footballer
- Jon Friedberg, American poker player and business owner
- Jon Fugler (born 1962), English musician
- Jon Fuller, American academic and medical doctor
- Jon Erik Fyrwald (born 1959), American businessman, former Chief Executive Officer of Syngenta Group
- Jon Atle Gaarder (1934–2020), Norwegian diplomat
- Jon Gabrus (born 1982), American actor and comedian
- Jon Gadsby (1953–2015), New Zealand writer and comedian
- Jon Gaines II (born 1999), American football player
- Jon Gallagher (born 1996), Irish footballer
- Jon Garaño (born 1974), Spanish film director and screenwriter
- Jon Garavaglia (born 1974), American basketball player
- Jon García, multiple people
- Jon Garland (born 1979), American baseball player
- Jon Ander Garrido (born 1989), Spanish footballer
- Jon Garrison (born 1944), American tenor
- Jon Gaunt (born 1961), British journalist
- Jon Gaztañaga (born 1991), Spanish footballer
- Jon Gee (born 1959), Australian politician
- Jon Gelius (born 1964), Norwegian journalist
- Jon Gerrard (born 1947), Canadian politician
- Jon Gettman (born 1957), American activist
- Jon Gibson, multiple people
- Jon Giesler (born 1956), American football player
- Jon Gilliam (1938–2020), American football player
- Jon Gillies (born 1994), American ice hockey player
- Jon Gindick (born 1948), American musician
- Jon Ginoli (born 1959), American guitarist
- Jon Gisle (born 1948), Norwegian jurist, encyclopedist and philologist
- Jon Gittens (1964–2019), English footballer
- Jon Gjerde (1953–2008), American politician
- Jon Gjønnes (1931–2021), Norwegian physicist
- Jon Glaser (born 1968), American actor, comedian, and writer
- Jon D. Glassman (born 1944), American diplomat
- Jon Gleed (born 1984), Canadian ice hockey player
- Jon Glover (born 1952), English actor
- Jon Gnagy (1907–1981), American television art instructor
- Jon Goddard (born 1982), English rugby league footballer
- Jon Godden (1906–1984), English novelist
- Jon Godfread (born 1982), American politician
- Jon Andoni Goikoetxea (born 1965), Spanish footballer
- Jon Golding (born 1982), English rugby union player
- Jon Gomez (born 1990), Spanish television presenter
- Jon Gomm (born 1977), English musical artist
- Jon González (born 1973), Spanish footballer and coach
- Jon Gooch (born 1984), British drum and bass, dubstep and electro house producer and DJ
- Jon Goodman (born 1971), footballer
- Jon Goodridge (born 1981), English rugby union player
- Jon Goodwin, multiple people
- John Gordon, multiple people
- Jon Gorenc Stanković (born 1996), Slovenian footballer
- Jon Gorrotxategi (born 2002), Spanish footballer
- Jon Gosier (born 1981), American software developer
- Jon Gosselin (born 1977), American television personality
- Jon Gott (born 1985), Canadian football player
- Jon Gould (1953–1986), film executive
- Jon Dee Graham, American musician, guitarist and songwriter
- Jon Gray (born 1991), American baseball player
- Jon Grayshon (born 1983), English rugby league footballer
- Jon Green (born 1985), Australian rugby league footballer
- Jon Green (cricketer) (born 1980), English cricketer
- Jon Gregory, multiple people
- Jon Greiner (born 1951), American politician and police chief
- Jon Grepstad (born 1944), Norwegian freelance journalist
- Jon Gries (born 1957), American actor, director, and writer
- Jon Grieve, Australian rugby league footballer
- Jon Courtenay Grimwood, Maltese-born British science fiction and fantasy author
- Jon Gruden (born 1963), American football coach
- Jon Grunseth (born 1945), American businessman and politician
- Jon Guenther, American novelist
- Jon Guerra (born 1985), American devotional music singer-songwriter
- Jon R. Guiles (born 1945), American politician
- Jon Gundersen, American diplomat
- Jon Gunn (born 1973), American film director
- Jon Arne Gunnerud, Norwegian handball player
- Jon Gunnes (born 1956), Norwegian politician
- Jon Guridi (born 1995), Spanish footballer
- Jon Guruzeta (born 2000), Spanish footballer
- Jon Guthrie (born 1992), English footballer
- Jon Gutierrez (born 1995), Filipino rapper and actor
- Jon Guttormssøn (died 1577), Norwegian priest and bishop
- Jon Haarberg, Norwegian writer and professor
- Jon Haber, American activist
- Jon Ha-chol (born 1928), North Korean politician
- Jon Haffner (born 1940), Norwegian physician
- Jon Haggins (1943–2023), American fashion designer
- Jon Halapio (born 1991), American football player
- Jon Hall, multiple people
- Jon Halliday (born 1939), Irish historian
- Jon Hallworth (born 1965), English footballer
- Jon Anders Halvorsen (born 1968), Norwegian folk singer and physician
- Jon Hameister-Ries (1984–2021), Canadian gridiron football player
- Jon Hamilton, American journalist
- Jon Hamm (born 1971), American actor
- Jon Ludvig Hammer (born 1990), Norwegian chess grandmaster
- Jon Hammes, American businessman
- Jon Hand (born 1963), American football player
- Jon Hansen (born 1985), American attorney and legislator
- Jon Hanssen-Bauer (born 1952), Norwegian anthropologist, researcher and diplomat
- Jon Rangfred Hanssen (born 1956), Norwegian cyclist
- Jon Harding, New Zealand ecologist
- Jon Hardister (born 1982), American politician
- Jon Hardy (born 1960), Kenyan-born English cricketer
- Jon Hardy (rugby league) (born 1956), American rugby league player
- Jon Hare (born 1966), English computer game designer
- Jon Harley (born 1979), English footballer
- Jon Harnett (born 1988), Canadian lacrosse player
- Jon Harper (born 1978), British musician
- Jonathan Harris, multiple people
- Jon Harrison, multiple people
- Jon Hart (born 1969), Australian rugby union player
- Jon Hassall (born 1973), Australian rules footballer
- Jon Hassell (1937–2021), American trumpeter
- Jon Hassler (1933–2008), American novelist and educator
- Jon Haukeland (born 1953), Norwegian ice hockey coach and administrator
- Jon Havelock, Canadian politician
- Jon Haward, British comics artist
- Jon Hawkins, American politician
- Jon Heacock (born 1960), American football player and coach
- Jon Hecht, politician in Massachusetts
- Jon Heder (born 1977), American actor
- Jon Heese (born 1963), Japanese politician
- Jon Heggedal (born 1935), Norwegian actor
- Jon Heidenreich (born 1969), American professional wrestler and football player
- Jon Hein (born 1967), American broadcaster
- Jon Hellesnes (born 1939), Norwegian philosopher, novelist and essayist
- Jon Hellevig (1962–2020), Finnish lawyer and businessman
- Jon Henderson (born 1944), American football player
- Jon Hendricks (1921–2017), American jazz lyricist and singer
- Jon Hendricks (artist) (born 1939), American artist, activist and curator
- Jon Henricks (born 1935), Australian Olympic swimmer
- Jon Hensley (born 1965), American actor
- Jon Herb (born 1970), American racing driver and sex offender
- Jon Herington (born 1954), American guitarist
- Jon Hernandez (1969–1993), Filipino actor
- Jon Hess, multiple people
- Jon Hesse (born 1973), American football player
- Jon Hewitt (born 1959), Australian film director
- Jon-Erik Hexum (1957–1984), American actor and model
- Jon Heyman (born 1961), American sports journalist
- Jon Hicks, multiple people
- Jon B. Higgins (1939–1984), American singer
- Jon Hilbert (born 1975), American football player
- Jon Hill, multiple people
- Jon Hilliman (born 1995), American football player
- Jon Hinck (born 1954), American politician
- Jon Hinrichsen (born 1999), South African cricketer
- Jon Hinson (1942–1995), American politician
- Jon Hirschtick, software developer and founder of SolidWorks
- Jon Hiseman (1944–2018), English drummer and sound engineer
- Jon Olav Hjelde (born 1972), Norwegian footballer
- Jon Hoadley (born 1983), American politician
- Jon Hodnemyr (born 1995), Norwegian footballer
- Jon Hohman (1942–2018), American football player
- Jon Inge Høiland (born 1977), Norwegian footballer
- Jon Hoke (born 1957), American football player and coach
- Jon Hol, Norwegian engineer and activist
- Jon Robert Holden (born 1976), American-Russian professional basketball player
- Jon Holland (born 1987), Australian cricketer
- Jon Hollingsworth (1971–2006), British Army Special Air Service soldier
- Jon Holmes (born 1973), English comedian and writer
- Jon Holst-Christensen (born 1968), Danish badminton player
- Jon Hooker (born 1972), English footballer
- Jon Hopkins (born 1979), English musician and producer
- Jon Horford (born 1991), American basketball player
- Jon Horst (born 1983), American basketball manager
- Jon Horton, multiple people
- Jon T. Hougen (1936–2019), American spectroscopist
- Jon Howard (born 1985), American musician
- Jon Hromek, Canadian politician
- Jon Hubbard (born 1946), American politician
- Jon Huber (born 1981), American baseball player
- Jon Barlow Hudson (born 1945), American sculptor
- Jon Huertas (born 1969), American actor
- Jon Hui-jong (1930–2020), Norwegian politician
- Jon Hul, American pin-up artist
- Jon Hume (born 1983), New Zealand musician
- Jon Hummel (born 1957), Australian rules footballer
- Jon Hunt (born 1953), British businessman
- Jon Blair Hunter (born 1938), American politician
- Jon Huntsman, multiple people
- Jon Hurwitz (born 1977), American screenwriter and director
- Jon Hustad (1968–2023), Norwegian journalist
- Jon Husted (born 1967), American politician
- Jon Hutman, American production designer
- Jon Hyde, American singer
- Jon Hye-yong (born 1977), North Korean footballer
- Jon Hynes, American musician
- Jon Hyon-chol, North Korean politician
- Jon Hyon-ju (born 1983), North Korean diver
- Jon Iles (born 1954), English actor
- Jon Imber, American artist
- Jon In-chan, North Korean diplomat
- Jon Ingold, British writer
- Jon Ander Insausti (born 1992), Spanish cyclist
- Jon Ippolito (born 1962), American artist
- Jon Irabagon, American musician and jazz saxophonist
- Jon Irazabal (born 1996), Spanish footballer
- Jon Ireland (born 1967), Australian tennis player
- Jon Irisarri (born 1995), Spanish cyclist
- Jon Iru (born 1993), Spanish footballer
- Jon Jo Irwin (born 1969), English boxer
- Jon Isaacs (born 1949), Australian politician
- Jon Istad (1937–2012), Norwegian biathlete and sport shooter
- Jon Jacobs (born 1966), English actor
- Jon Jacobsen (born 1961), American politician
- Jon Jae-son (born 1940), North Korean general
- Jon Jæger Gåsvatn (born 1954), Norwegian politician
- Jon Jakobsen Venusinus (c. 1563–1608), Danish theologian, naturalist and historian
- Jon Jang (born 1954), American jazz pianist, composer, and bandleader
- Jon Jang-mi (born 2001), North Korean artistic gymnast
- Jon Jansen (born 1976), American football player
- Jon Jaqua (born 1948), American football player
- Jon Jaques (born 1988), American basketball player
- Jon Jarl (died c. 1206), Swedish jarl
- Jon Jashni, American media executive
- Jon Jay (born 1985), American baseball player
- Jon Jaylo, Filipino surrealist painter
- Jon Jefferson (born 1955), American writer
- Jon Jelacic (1936–1993), American gridiron football player
- Jon Jenkins (born 1958), Australian politician
- Jon Jenkins (American football) (1926–1999)
- Jon Jennings (born 1962), American politician and basketball coach
- John Jensen, multiple people
- Jon Jerde (1940–2015), American architect
- Jon Joffin (born 1963), South African cinematographer
- Jon Lech Johansen (born 1983), Norwegian programmer
- Jon Johanson, Australian aviator
- Jon Johansson, New Zealand political scientist
- Jon T. Johnsen (born 1942), Norwegian legal scholar
- Jon Johnson (born 1954), American sound editor
- Jon Jones, multiple people
- Jon Jonsson i Källeräng (1867–1939), Swedish politician
- Jon Jost (born 1943), American independent filmmaker
- Jon Juaristi (born 1951), Basque writer
- Jon Judkins (born 1964), American basketball player and coach
- Jon Kaas, American neuroscientist
- Jon Kabat-Zinn (born 1944), American professor emeritus of medicine
- Jon Kabir (born 1979), Bangladeshi singer, actor, and model
- Jon Kalb (1941–2017), American geologist
- Jon Kalinski (born 1987), Canadian ice hockey player
- Jon Kane, American film director
- Jon Kaplan, multiple people
- Jon Karamatsu (born 1974), American politician
- Jon Karrikaburu (born 2002), Spanish footballer
- Jon Katz (born 1947), American journalist
- Jon Kay (born 1969), English TV presenter and journalist
- Jon Kedrowski (born 1979), American mountain climber
- Jon Keeyes (born 1969), American film director
- Jon Keighren (born 1967), British football commentator
- Jon Kelley (born 1965), American football player
- Jon Kelly, British audio engineer
- Jon Kelly (swimmer) (born 1965), Canadian swimmer
- Jon Kempin (born 1993), American soccer player
- Jon Kennedy, multiple people
- Jon Kenny (1957–2024), Irish comedian and actor
- Jon Kent (born 1979), South African cricketer
- Jon Kenworthy (born 1974), Welsh footballer
- Jon Kessler, American artist
- Jon Keyser (born 1981), American politician
- Jon Keyworth (born 1950), American football player
- Jon Kilgore (1943–2020), American football player
- Jon Kilik (born 1956), American film producer
- Jon Kimche (1909–1994), Swiss journalist
- Jon Kimmel (born 1960), American football player
- Jon Kimmich, American video game developer
- Jon Kimura Parker (born 1959), Canadian musician
- Jon King (born 1955), English singer, musician, songwriter and Grammy nominated art director
- Jon King (1963–1995), American actor and model
- Jon Kinyon (born 1962), American writer
- Jon Luke Kirby (born 1998), English rugby league footballer
- Jon Kirksey (born 1970), American football player
- Jon Kistler (born 2003), Swiss ski mountaineer
- Jon Kitna (born 1972), American football player
- Jon Inge Kjørum (born 1965), Norwegian ski jumper
- Jon Klassen (born 1981), Canadian writer and illustrator
- Jonathan Klein, multiple people
- Jon Kleinberg (born 1971), American computer scientist
- Jon Klemm (born 1970), Canadian ice hockey player
- Jon Klette (1962–2016), Norwegian jazz musician
- Jon Kline (born 1980), American cinematographer and filmmaker
- Jon Knokey (born 1981), American politician
- Jon Knott (born 1978), American baseball player
- Jon Knox, American session drummer
- Jon Knudsen (born 1974), Norwegian football coach
- Jon Knuts (born 1991), Swedish ice hockey player
- Jon Kolb (born 1947), American football player
- Jon Koncak (born 1963), American basketball player
- Jon Konigshofer (1906–1990), American architect
- Jon Korkes (1945–2025), American actor
- Jon Kortajarena (born 1985), Spanish model and actor
- Jon Koznick (born 1972), American politician
- Jon Kraft, American business executive
- Jon Krahulik (1944–2005), American judge
- Jon Krakauer (born 1954), American writer and journalist
- Jon Krause (born 1981), Australian politician
- Jon Kreamelmeyer, American cross-country skiing coach
- Jon Kreft (born 1986), American basketball player
- Jon Krick (born 1972), American football player
- Jon Kroll, American producer, director, and writer
- Jon Kudelka (1972–2026), Australian cartoonist
- Jon Kukla, American historian and author
- Jon Kull, chemist and academic administrator
- Jon B. Kutler (born 1956), American chief executive
- Jon Kvist (born 1967), Danish researcher and author
- Jon Kwang-ho, North Korean politician
- Jon Kyl (1942–2026), American politician and lobbyist
- Jon Kyong-hui (born 1986), North Korean long distance runner
- Jon Kyongnin (born 1962), South Korean writer
- Jon Laine (born 1975), American musician
- Jon Lajoie (born 1980), Canadian comedian, actor, and singer
- Jon Ander Lambea (born 1973), Spanish footballer and manager
- Jon Lancaster (born 1988), British racing driver
- Jon Ray Lancaster, American politician
- Jon Land, American author and screenwriter
- Jon Landau (born 1947), American music critic and record producer
- Jon Landau (film producer) (1960–2024), American film producer
- Jon Landon (born 1979), Canadian football player
- Jon Landry, multiple people
- Jon Lane (born 1949), British ice dancing coach and former competitor
- Jon Lange (born 1980), Danish actor
- Jon Langford (born 1957), Welsh musician and artist
- Jon Langston (born 1991), American musician, singer and songwriter
- Jon Lansman (born 1957), British political activist
- Jon Lantz (1952–2007), American football player and coach
- Jon Larrinaga (born 1990), Spanish cyclist
- Jon Larsen, multiple people
- Jon Latimer (1964–2009), British military historian
- Jon Laukvik (born 1952), Norwegian organist
- Jon Laurimore (born 1936), British actor
- Jon Lawrence, British historian
- Jon Laws (born 1964), English footballer
- Jon Arvid Lea (born 1948), Norwegian civil servant
- Jon Leach (born 1973), American tennis player and investment banker
- Jon Lebkowsky (born 1949), American writer
- Jon Ledecky (born 1958), American businessman
- Jon Lee, multiple people
- Jon Leiberman, American television producer
- Jon Leibowitz (born 1958), American lawyer
- Jon Leicester (born 1979), American baseball player
- Jon Magne Leinaas (born 1946), Norwegian theoretical physicist
- Jon Leirfall (1899–1998), Norwegian politician
- Jon Lemmon (born 1984), American soccer player
- Jon Lester (born 1984), American baseball player
- Jon Leuer (born 1989), American basketball player
- Jon D. Levenson (born 1949), American Hebrew Bible scholar
- Jonathan Levine, multiple people
- Jon Levisohn, American academic
- Jon Levy, multiple people
- Jon Lewis, multiple people
- Jon Leyne (1958–2013), BBC journalist
- Jon Lieber (born 1970), American baseball player
- Jon Lien (1939–2010), Canadian conservationist
- Jon Lilletun (1945–2006), Norwegian politician
- Jon Lilley (born 1947), Australian rules footballer
- Jon Lind (1948–2022), American songwriter and performer
- Jon Lindbergh (1932–2021), American underwater diver
- Jon Lindgren, American politician
- Jon Lindsay (politician) (1935–2026), American politician
- Jon Lindsay (musician) (born 1980/1), American recording artist
- Jon Anders Lindstad (born 1994), Norwegian freestyle skier
- Jon Lindstrom (born 1957), American actor
- Jon Link (born 1984), American baseball player
- Jon Litscher (born 1944), American politician
- Jon Harlan Livezey (born 1938), American politician and lawyer
- Jon Lizotte (born 1994), American ice hockey player
- Jon Ljungberg, television personality and comedian
- John Lloyd, multiple people
- Jon Onye Lockard (1932–2015), American artist
- Jon Locke (1927–2013), American television and film actor
- Jon Lomberg (born 1948), American artist and journalist
- Jon Loomis, American poet and writer
- Jon Ander López (1976–2013), Spanish footballer
- Jon Lord, multiple people
- Jon Lormer (1906–1986), American actor
- Jon Lovett (born 1982), American podcaster, writer and television producer
- Jon Lovitz (born 1957), American actor and comedian
- Jon Lucas (born 1975), American screenwriter and director
- Jon Lucas (actor) (born 1995), Filipino actor
- Jon Lucien (1942–2007), British Virgin Islander musical artist
- Jon Lufkin (born 1947), American cross-country skier
- Jon Lugbill (born 1961), American canoeist
- Jon Lukas (1948–2021), Maltese musician
- Jon A. Lund (born 1928), American attorney and politician
- Jon Lundberg (born 1961), American politician
- Jon Lundblad (born 1982), Swedish footballer
- Jon Lung, American television personality
- Jon L. Luther, American foodservice industry executive
- Jon Luvelli (born 1979), Italian–born American street photographer
- Jon Lyng (1945–2003), Norwegian lawyer and politician
- Jon Macken (born 1977), English footballer and manager
- Jon MacKinnon (born 1977), Canadian field hockey player
- Jon MacLennan (born 1987), guitarist and instructor
- Jon Macy, Gay American cartoonist
- Jon C. Madonna (died 2018), American businessman
- Jon Madsen (born 1980), American mixed martial artist
- Jon Magnussen (born 1959), Norwegian economist
- Jon Magrin (born 1994), Maltese rugby league footballer
- Jon Maguire, Welsh musical artist
- Jon Magunazelaia (born 2001), Spanish footballer
- Jon Maloney (born 1985), English footballer
- Jon Manasse, American clarinetist
- Jon Mandle (born 1966), American philosopher
- Jon Maner, American social psychologist and professor at Florida State University
- Jon Manfrellotti, American actor
- Jon Mannah (1989–2013), Australian rugby league footballer
- Jon Jørundson Mannsåker (1880–1964), Norwegian priest and politician
- Jon Mårdalen (1895–1977), Norwegian cross-country skier
- Jon Mark (1943–2021), English singer-songwriter and guitarist
- Jon Marks (1947–2007), British jazz pianist
- Jon Marshall (born 1970), British industrial engineer
- Jon Edward Martin, American author
- Jon Martín (born 2006), Spanish footballer
- Jon Masalin (born 1986), Finnish footballer and coach
- Jon Mathews, American physicist
- Jon Matlack (born 1950), American baseball player
- Jon Matsumoto (born 1986), Canadian ice hockey player
- Jon Matthews (born 1977), American film director
- Jon Mattock, English drummer
- Jon Luke Mau, German weightlifter
- J. Peter May (born 1939), American mathematician
- Jon Mayer (born 1938), American jazz pianist and composer
- Jon McBride (1943–2024), American astronaut
- Jon McBride (filmmaker), American film director
- Jon Phipps McCalla (1947–2026), American judge
- Jon McCarthy (born 1970), Northern Ireland international footballer
- Jon McClure (born 1981), British musician
- Jon McCracken (born 2000), Scottish football player
- Jon McGlocklin (born 1943), American basketball player
- Jon McGraw (born 1979), American football player
- Jon McGregor (born 1976), British novelist and short story writer
- Jon McIsaac (born 1983), Canadian ice hockey referee
- Jon McKennedy (born 1987), American racing driver
- Jon McKenzie, performance theorist
- Jon McLachlan (1949–2024), New Zealand rugby union player
- Jon McLaren (born 1984), Canadian actor
- John McLaughlin, multiple people
- Jon McNaughton, American painter and conservative activist
- Jon McNeill, American businessman
- Jon McShane (born 1991), Scottish footballer
- Jon Meacham (born 1969), American journalist and biographer
- Jon Mead (born 1967), Canadian curler
- Jon Melander (born 1966), American football player
- Jon Mellish (born 1997), English footballer
- Jon Meloan (born 1984), American baseball player
- Jon Merrill (born 1992), American ice hockey player
- Jon Mersinaj (born 1999), Albanian footballer
- Jon F. Merz (born 1969), American writer
- Jon Metzger (born 1959), American musician and educator
- Jon Michelet (1944–2018), Norwegian author
- Jon Middlemiss (1949–2021), British artist and potter
- Jon Midttun Lie (born 1980), Norwegian footballer
- Jonathan Miller, multiple people
- Jon Milligan (born 1956), American politician
- Jon Mills (born 1978), Canadian golfer
- Jon L. Mills (born 1947), American lawyer and former politician
- Jon Minadeo II (born 1982), American antisemite and neo-nazi
- Jon Minnis, Canadian animator
- Jon Mirasty (born 1982), Canadian hockey player
- Jon Mitchell, multiple people
- Jon Mittelhauser, internet pioneer
- Jon Lennart Mjøen (1912–1997), Norwegian actor
- Jon R. Moeller, American businessman
- Jon Molin (born 1956), American tennis player
- Jon Molvig (1923–1970), Australian painter
- Jon Moncayola (born 1998), Spanish footballer
- Jon Montgomery (born 1979), Canadian skeleton racer
- Jon Mooallem, American journalist and author
- Jon Moore (born 1955), Welsh footballer
- Jon Morcillo (born 1998), Spanish footballer
- Jonathan Morgan, multiple people
- Jon Moritsugu (born 1965), American filmmaker and musician
- Jon Morosi (born 1982), American baseball journalist
- Jon Morris (born 1942), American football player
- Jon Morris (ice hockey) (born 1966), American ice hockey player
- Jon Morrison, Scottish actor
- Jon Morrison (baseball), American baseball player
- Jon Morter (born 1974), English radio disc jockey
- Jon Mosar, Swiss geologist and academic
- Jon Moscot (born 1991), American baseball player
- Jon Moss (born 1957), English drummer
- Jon Moss (referee) (born 1970), English football referee
- Jon Mostad (born 1942), Norwegian composer
- Jon Mould (born 1991), Welsh road bicycle racer
- Jon Moulton (born 1950), British venture capitalist
- Jon Moxley (born 1985), American professional wrestler
- Jon Moya (born 1983), Spanish footballer
- Jon Moynihan, Baron Moynihan of Chelsea (born 1948), British businessman
- Jon Mueller (born 1970), American percussionist and composer
- Jon Mueller (baseball) (born 1970), American college baseball coach
- Jon Mullich (born 1961), American actor and playwright
- Jon Mun-sop (1919–1998), North Korean politician
- Jon Murphy, multiple people
- Jon Murray, multiple people
- Jon J Muth (born 1960), American writer and illustrator
- Jon Myer (1922–2001), American inventor
- Jon D. Myers, American politician
- Jon Myong-hui (born 1986), North Korean footballer
- Jon Myong-hwa (born 1993), North Korean footballer
- Jon Myong-song (born 1993), North Korean weightlifter
- Jon Naar (1920–2017), American photographer
- Jon Naismith (born 1965), British radio producer
- Jon Nakamatsu, American musician
- Jon Narbett (born 1968), English footballer
- Jon Narvestad (1932–2015), Norwegian sportsperson and film distributor
- Jon Neill (born 1968), Scotland international rugby league footballer
- Jon Nelson, multiple people
- Jon Nese (born 1961), American meteorologist
- Jon Øivind Ness (born 1968), Norwegian composer
- Jon Neuhouser, American basketball player
- Jon Newby (born 1978), English footballer
- Jon Newlee (born 1959), American basketball coach
- Jon O. Newman (born 1932), American judge
- Jon Newsome (born 1970), English footballer
- Jon Nichols (born 1981), English footballer
- Jon Niese (born 1986), American baseball player
- Jon Nite (born 1980), American songwriter
- Jon Nödtveidt (1975–2006), Swedish musician
- Jon Nolan (born 1992), English footballer
- Jon Ola Norbom (1923–2020), Norwegian economist and politician
- Jon Nørgaard (born 1985), Danish singer
- Jon Normile (born 1967), American fencer
- Jon Norris (born 1962), American football player and coach
- Jon Nunnally (born 1971), American baseball player
- Jon Nurse (born 1981), Barbadian football coach and former player
- Jon Oberheide, American computer scientist
- Jon O'Brien (born 1961), English footballer
- Jon O'Connor (born 1976), English footballer
- Jon Eirik Ødegaard (born 1972), Norwegian footballer
- Jon Øyvind Odland (born 1954), Norwegian politician
- Jon Odlum (1936–2013), St. Lucian politician
- Jon O'Donnell (1954–1997), English footballer
- Jon Odriozola (born 1970), Spanish bicycle racer
- Jon Ogborn, British physicist and educational developer
- Jon Øigarden (born 1971), Norwegian actor
- Jon Okafor (born 1989), American soccer player
- Jon Ander Olasagasti (born 2000), Spanish footballer
- Jon Oliva (born 1960), American heavy metal singer
- Jon Olsen (born 1969), American swimmer
- Jon Olsson (born 1982), Swedish freestyle skier
- Jon O'Mahony (born 1973), British musical artist
- Jon Oosterhuis (born 1977), Canadian gridiron football player
- Jon Opstad, British composer
- Jon Oringer (born 1974), American businessman
- Jon Orloff (born 1942), American physicist, author and professor
- Jon Ortner (born 1951), American photographer
- Jon Aukrust Osmoen (born 1992), Norwegian orienteer
- Jon Ossoff (born 1987), American politician and filmmaker
- Jon Otsemobor (born 1983), English footballer
- Jon Ott (1909–2000), American artist
- Jon Terje Øverland (born 1944), Norwegian alpine skier
- Jon Owen (born 1963), American luger
- Jon Reidar Øyan (born 1981), Norwegian gay rights activist
- Jon Pacheco (born 2001), Spanish footballer
- Jon Palfreman (born 1950), American film producer
- Jon Papernick, American novelist
- Jon Pardi (born 1985), American country singer
- Jon Pareles (born 1953), American journalist
- Jon Paris, American computer scientist
- Jon Jon Park (born 1957), British swimmer
- Jon Parkin (born 1981), English footballer
- Jon Pearce (born 1977), British politician
- Jon Pearn, British record producer
- Jon Pedersen (born 1957), Danish equestrian
- Jon Pelle (born 1986), American ice hockey player
- Jon Penington (1922–1997), British screenwriter and producer
- Jon Perlman (born 1956), American baseball player
- Jon Pertwee (1919–1996), English actor
- Jon Peters (born 1945), American film producer
- Jon Peters (pitcher), American baseball player
- Jon Peterson, multiple people
- Jon Petrie (born 1976), Scotland international rugby union player
- Jon Petrovich (1947–2011), journalist and television executive
- Jon Phelan (born 1986), Canadian rugby player
- Jon Phillip (born 1979), American drummer
- Jon Philp, Australian diplomat and career officer
- Jon Paul Piques (born 1986), Canadian actor, director, internet celebrity and soccer player
- Jon T. Pitts (1948–2024), American mathematician
- Jon Platt (born 1964), American music-publishing executive
- Jon Pleased Wimmin, British electronic musician
- Jon Plowman, British television executive
- Jon Plumer (born 1955), American politician
- Jon Pointing, English actor and writer
- Jon Poling (born 1970), American physician
- Jon Polito (1950–2016), American actor
- Jon Poll, American film director
- Jon Pollock (born 1977), British wheelchair basketball player
- Jon Ponder, American thrice-convicted bank-robber
- Jon Poole (born 1969), British singer-songwriter
- Jon Poppe (born 1984), American football coach
- Jon Porter (born 1955), American politician
- Jon Postel (1943–1998), American computer scientist and internet pioneer
- Jon Potter (born 1963), field hockey player and businessman
- Jon Povey (1942–2023), English drummer
- Jon Povill (born 1946), American screenwriter
- Jon Prescott (born 1981), American actor and model
- Jon Preston (born 1967), New Zealand rugby union player
- Jon Price (born 1973), Swedish rapper
- Jon Proudstar (born 1967), American actor
- Jon Provost (born 1950), American actor
- Jon Prusmack (died 2018), American rugby player and businessman
- Jon Pult (born 1984), Swiss politician
- Jon Painter, American politician
- Jon Paul Puno, American film director
- Jon Purdie (born 1967), English footballer
- Jon Purnell, American diplomat
- Jon Pylypchuk (born 1972), Canadian artist
- Jon Pynoos (born 1942), American gerontologist
- Jon Pyong-ho (1926–2014), North Korean general
- Jon Qwelane (1952–2020), Ancient South African journalist, broadcaster and diplomat
- Jon Radoff (born 1972), American entrepreneur
- Jon Rafman, Canadian artist, filmmaker and essayist
- Jon Rahm (born 1994), Spanish golfer
- Jon Ralston (born 1959), American journalist and political commentator
- Jon Ramstad (1925–2014), Norwegian politician
- Jon Randall (born 1969), American musician and producer
- Jon Rankin (born 1982), American track and field runner
- Jon Ratliff (born 1971), American baseball player
- Jon Rauch (born 1978), American baseball player
- Jon Raven (died 2015), British writer
- Jon Redman, American racing driver
- Jon Redwine, American record producer
- Jon Reep (born 1972), American actor
- Jon Reinertsen (born 1946), Norwegian handball player
- Jon Reinhardt (1943–2020), American politician
- Jon Reiss, American film director
- Jon Rennard, English singer and songwriter
- Jon Reyes, Canadian politician
- Jon A. Reynolds (1937–2022), U. S. Air Force officer
- Jon Rhattigan (born 1999), American football player
- Jon Rheault (born 1986), American professional ice hockey player
- Jon Rhodes (born 1947), Australian photographer
- Jon Richards (born 1963), American politician
- Jon Richardson, multiple people
- Jon Richt (born 1990), American football coach
- Jon Rigby (born 1965), English footballer
- Jon Riggs (born 1962), Australian rules footballer
- Jon Rish (born 1973), American radio personality
- Jon Ritchie (born 1974), American football player and sports radio host
- Jon Ritman, British video game designer
- Jon Ritzheimer (born 1983), American political activist and former naval officer
- Jon H. Roberts (born 1947), American historian
- Jon Roberts (1948–2011), American drug trafficker
- Jon Roberts (footballer) (born 1968), Welsh footballer
- Jon Robertson (born 1989), Scottish footballer
- Jon Robinson, multiple people
- Jon Robyns (born 1982), British actor
- Jon Roehlk (1961–2016), American football player
- Jon Rohloff (born 1969), American ice hockey player
- Jon Peter Rolie (1945–2020), Norwegian novelist
- Jon Rollason (1931–2016), English actor and writer
- Jon Romano, TikTok influencer and convicted school shooter
- Jon Rønningen (born 1962), Norwegian wrestler
- Jon Ronson (born 1967), British-American journalist, author, and filmmaker
- Jon van Rood (1926–2017), Dutch immunologist
- Jon Root (born 1964), American volleyball player
- Jon Roper (born 1976), English rugby league footballer
- Jon Rose (born 1951), Australian musical artist
- Jon Rosenthal (born 1963), American engineer and politician
- Jon Rothstein, American sports writer and reporter
- Jon Routledge (born 1989), English footballer
- Jon Routson (born 1969), American artist
- Jon André Røyrane (born 1983), Norwegian footballer
- Jon Rua (born 1983), American actor, singer and choreographer
- Jon Rubin, American artist and educator
- Jon Rubinstein (born 1956), American electrical engineer
- Jon Raahauge Rud (born 1986), Danish swimmer
- Jon Rudkin (born 1968), English football manager
- Jon Rudnitsky (born 1989), American actor and comedian
- Jon Ruggles (born 1973), American businessman
- Jon Runyan Sr. (born 1973), American football player and politician
- Jon Runyan Jr. (born 1997), American football player
- Jon Russell (born 2000), English footballer
- Jon Ryan (born 1981), Canadian football player
- Jon Rydberg (born 1977), American wheelchair tennis player
- Jon Sakovich (born 1970), Guamanian-American swimmer
- Jon Sallinen (born 2000), Finnish freestyle skier
- Jon Sammels (born 1945), English footballer
- Jon Ola Sand (born 1961), Norwegian television executive
- Jon Sanders, multiple people
- Jon Sandusky (born 1977), American sports executive
- Jon Santacana (born 1980), Spanish para-alpine skier
- Jon Santiago (born 1982), American politician and physician
- Jon Sarkin (1953–2024), American painter
- Jon Savage (born 1953), English music journalist
- Jon Sawyer (born 1964), American football player
- Jon Scales (born 1974), English rugby footballer
- Jon Schaffer (born 1968), American guitarist
- Jon Scheyer (born 1987), American-Israeli basketball player and coach
- Jon Schillaci (born 1971), American child sex offender and former fugitive
- Jon Schleuss, American labor union leader
- Jon Schmidt (born 1966), American pianist
- Jon Schnepp (1967–2018), American filmmaker
- Jon Schofield, Australian musician
- Jon Schofield (canoeist) (born 1985), British canoeist
- Jon Schroder (born 1973), American filmmaker
- Jon Schueler (1916–1992), American painter
- Jon Schwartz (born 1956), American drummer
- Jon Sciambi (born 1970), American baseball broadcaster
- Jon Scieszka (born 1954), American children's writer and reading advocate
- Jon Scott (born 1958), American television news anchor
- Jon Scullion (born 1995), Scottish footballer
- Jon Morgan Searle (1930–2012), Gibraltarian journalist and editor
- Jon Secada (born 1961), Cuban–born American singer and songwriter
- Jon Seda (born 1970), American actor
- Jon Seeliger (born 1995), South African sprinter
- Jon Seger, American ecologist
- Jon Sen (born 1978), British film director
- Jon Ander Serantes (born 1989), Spanish footballer
- Jon Serl (1894–1993), American artist
- Jon Servold (born 1960), Canadian Nordic combined skier
- Jon Sesso (born 1953), American politician
- Jon Shafer (born 1985), American video game designer
- Jon Shain (born 1967), American singer songwriter
- Jon Shanklin (born 1953), British scientist
- Jon Sharp (born 1967), English RL coach and former rugby league footballer
- Jon Shave (baseball) (born 1967), American baseball player
- Jon Shave (musician), songwriter and music producer
- Jon Shaw (born 1983), English footballer
- Jon Sheffield (born 1969), English footballer and coach
- Jon Shenk, American documentary filmmaker
- Jon Shepheard (born 1981), English footballer
- Jon Shepodd (1927–2017), American actor
- Jon Shields (born 1964), American football player
- Jon Shirley (born 1938), American business magnate and philanthropist
- Jon Sholle (1948–2018), American musician
- Jon Shortridge (born 1947), British civil servant
- Jon Siebels (born 1979), American musician
- Jon Sieben (born 1966), Australian swimmer
- Jon Silkin (1930–1997), British poet
- Jon Sim (born 1977), Canadian ice hockey player
- Jon Simmons, American talent manager and acting coach
- Jon B. Simonis, American serial rapist
- Jon Simonssøn (1512–1575), Norwegian city manager, lawspeaker and humanist
- Jon Reed Sims (1947–1984), American conductor
- Jon Singleton (accountant), Canadian public servant
- Jon Singleton (baseball) (born 1991), American baseball player
- Jon Sinton, American serial media entrepreneur
- Jon Siren (born 1978), American musician
- Jon Sivewright (born 1965), Australian actor
- Jon Skeie (1871–1951), Norwegian jurist
- Jon Skolmen (1940–2019), Norwegian actor and comedian
- Jon Sleightholme (born 1972), English rugby union player
- Jonathan Smith, multiple people
- Jon Hallvardson Smør, Norwegian nobleman
- Jon Snersrud (1902–1986), Norwegian Nordic combined skier
- Jon Snoddy, American technology expert
- Jon Snodgrass (sociologist) (1941–2015), Panamanian author
- Jon Snodgrass (musician), American singer-songwriter
- Jon Snow (born 1947), English journalist and television presenter
- Jon Sobrino (born 1938), Spanish Jesuit and theologian
- Jon Solly (born 1963), British long-distance runner
- Jon Solomon (born 1973), American radio disc jockey
- Jon Soltz, American military officer and political advocate
- Jon Sonju (born 1975), American politician
- Jon Sopel (born 1959), British journalist
- Jon Sortland (born 1973), American drummer
- Jon Spaihts (born 1970), American screenwriter and author
- Jon Speelman (born 1956), English chess grandmaster
- Jon Hunter Spence (1945–2011), American writer
- Jon Spencer (born 1965), American singer-songwriter
- Jon Spinogatti, American television and film actor
- Jon Spoelstra (born 1946), American author, sports marketer and business executive
- Jon Šporn (born 1997), Slovenian footballer
- Jon Springer (born 1966), American independent filmmaker
- Jon Sprunk, American fantasy author
- Jon St. Ables (1912–1999), Canadian comics artist
- Jon St. Andre (1939–2017), American ski jumper
- Jon St. Denis, Canadian curler
- Jon St. Elwood (born 1952), American actor
- Jon St. James, American songwriter/producer
- Jon St. John (born 1960), American voice actor
- Jon Staggers (born 1948), American football player
- Jon Stallworthy (1935–2014), British literary critic, professor and poet
- Jon Stanard, American politician
- Jon Stanhope (born 1951), Australian politician
- Jon Stanley (born 1943), American volleyball player
- Jon Stead (born 1983), English footballer
- Jon Stebbins, California musical artist
- Jon Steel (born 1980), Scotland dual-code rugby international footballer
- Jon Steele, American expat author
- Jon Stein, American fintech entrepreneur
- Jon Steinbrecher, athletics commissioner
- Jon Paul Steuer (1984–2018), American actor
- Jon Stevens (born 1961), New Zealand singer
- Jon Stevenson (born 1982), English footballer
- Jon Stewart, multiple people
- Jon Stickley, American guitarist
- Jon Stinchcomb (born 1979), American football player
- Jon Stock (born 1966), British writer
- Jon Stoll (1953–2008), business executive
- Jon Stone (1931–1997), American writer, television producer and director
- Jon Stone (poet) (born 1983), British poet
- Jon Storm-Mathisen (born 1941), Norwegian neuroscientist
- Jon Stratton (born 1950), Australian academic
- Jon Strauss, American academic administrator
- Jon Striefsky (born 1986), American football player
- Jon Rune Strøm (born 1985), Norwegian jazz musician
- Jon Stryker, American architect
- Jon Sudbø (born 1961), Norwegian dentist, physician and former medical researcher
- Jon Sullivan (1950–2021), Australian politician
- Jon Micah Sumrall (born 1980), American musical performer and lead vocalist
- Jon Sumrall (born 1982), American football player and coach
- Jon Sundby (1883–1972), Norwegian farmer and politician
- Jon Sunderland (born 1975), English footballer
- Jon Sundvold (born 1961), American basketball player
- Jon Sung-hun (born 1951), North Korean politician
- Jon Svendsen (1953–2024), American water polo player
- Jon Swain (born 1948), British journalist
- Jon Swan (1929–2022), American dramatist
- Jon Switalski (born 1978), American politician
- Jon Switzer (born 1979), American baseball player
- Jon Symon (1941–2015), British rock musician
- Jon Syverson (born 1980), American drummer
- Jon Szczepanski, American soccer player
- Jon Taffer (born 1954), American entrepreneur and television personality
- Jon Taylor, multiple people
- Jon C. Teaford (born 1943), American historian
- Jon Tecedor (1975–2008), Spanish weightlifter
- Jon Tennant (1988–2020), English paleontologist
- Jon Tenney (born 1961), American actor
- Jon Tenuta (born 1957), American football player and coach
- Jon Teske (born 1997), American basketball player
- Jon Tester (born 1956), American politician and farmer
- Jon Stephenson von Tetzchner (born 1967), Icelandic businessman
- Jon Thaxton (born 1974), British professional boxer
- Jon Theodore (born 1973), American drummer
- Jon Thiel (born 1975), Canadian rugby player
- Jon Thoday (born 1961), British television executive
- Jon Thomas, multiple people
- Jon Thompson, multiple people
- Jon Mikl Thor, Canadian bodybuilder, musician and actor
- Jon Thorbjörnson (born 1976), Swedish politician
- Jon Thorup, American politician
- Jon Thurlow (born 1980), American contemporary worship musician
- Jon Thurston (born 1984), Canadian wheelchair curler
- Jon Tickle (born 1974), British television presenter
- Jon S. Tigar (born 1962), American judge
- Jon Timmons (born 1991), Filipino American actor, model and television personality
- Jon Tiven (born 1955), American record producer
- Jon Tolaas (1939–2012), Norwegian teacher, poet and novelist
- Jon Tomlinson (born 1973), British aerodynamicist
- Jon Tonks, British photographer
- Jon Toogood (born 1971), New Zealand musician
- Jon Toral (born 1995), Spanish footballer
- Jon Toth (born 1994), American football player
- Jon Jon Traxx, American singer, songwriter, producer, multi-instrumentalist
- Jon Treml, American tennis player
- Jon Trickett (born 1950), British labour politician
- Jon Trimmer (1939–2023), New Zealand ballet dancer
- Jon Trott, multiple people
- Jon Tuck (born 1984), Guamanian martial artist
- Jon Tucker, Canadian filmmaker and journalist
- Jon Turner, British yachtsman
- Jon Turteltaub (born 1963), American filmmaker and producer
- Jon Tvedt (1966–2009), Norwegian orienteer and mountain runner
- Jon Åge Tyldum (born 1968), Norwegian biathlete
- Jon Ungphakorn (1947–2025), Thai politician
- Jon Unzaga (born 1962), Spanish cyclist
- Jon Urbanchek (1936–2024), American swimming coach
- Jon Uriarte (born 1961), Argentine volleyball player and coach
- Jon Urzelai (born 1977), Spanish footballer
- Jon Van Caneghem, American video game designer
- Jon Vander Ark, American business executive
- Jon Michael Varese (born 1971), American novelist and literary historian
- Jon Vaughn (born 1970), American football player
- Jon Vega (born 1994), Spanish footballer
- Jon Grunde Vegard (born 1957), Norwegian diver
- Jon F. Vein (born 1963), American lawyer
- Jon Venables (born 1982), British murderer
- Jon Vezner (born 1951), American songwriter
- Jon Vickers, multiple people
- Jon Xabier Vidal (born 1991), Spanish footballer
- Jon Vincent (1962–2000), American gay pornographic actor
- Jon Vinyl, Canadian singer
- Jon Vislie (1896–1945), Norwegian lawyer
- Jon Vitti, American television and film writer
- Jon Voight (born 1938), American actor
- Jon Volpe (born 1968), American gridiron football player
- Jon Walker (born 1985), American musician, singer, songwriter, and record producer
- Jon Wallis (born 1986), English footballer
- Jon Walmsley (born 1956), British actor and singer
- Jon Walshaw (born 1967), English cyclist
- Jon L. Wanzek (born 1964), American film producer
- Jon Warden (born 1946), American baseball player
- Jon Wassink (born 1997), American football player
- Jon Waters (born 1976), American marching band director
- Jon Watts (born 1981), American filmmaker
- Jon Wauford (born 1970), American football player and coach
- Jon Wayne, musical artist
- Jon Weaving (1931–2011), Australian opera singer
- John Weber, multiple people
- Jon Weeks (born 1986), American football player
- Jon Wefald (1937–2022), American academic
- Jon Weinbach (born 1976), American film producer
- Jon Weiner (born 1972), American sports talk radio host
- Jon Wellner (born 1975), American actor
- Jon A. Wellner (born 1945), American statistician
- Jon Wells (born 1978), English rugby league footballer, administrator and TV broadcaster
- Jon Welsh (born 1986), Scottish rugby union player
- Jon Wertheim, American sports journalist and author
- Jon Westborg (born 1946), Norwegian diplomat
- Jon Western (1963–2022), American political scientist
- Jon Westling (1942–2021), American educator
- Jon Whitcomb, American illustrator
- Jon White, multiple people
- Jon Whiteley (1945–2020), Scottish child actor and art historian
- Jon Whitmore (born 1945), American educator and academic
- Jon Whittle (born 1982), English rugby league footballer
- Jon Whyte (1941–1992), Canadian poet
- Jon Wiener (born 1944), American historian and journalist
- Jon P. Wilcox (born 1936), American judge
- Jon Wilkin (born 1983), English rugby league footballer and sports broadcaster
- Jonathan Williams, multiple people
- Jon Winkelried, American financial executive
- Jon Winokur (born 1947), American writer and editor
- Jon Winroth (1935–2006), American wine critic and educator
- Jon Witman (born 1972), American football player
- Jon Wolfe (born 1979), American country music singer-songwriter
- Jon A. Wolff (1956–2020), American geneticist
- Jon Wolfsthal, American security analyst
- Jon Wood (born 1981), NASCAR driver
- Jon Woods (born 1977), American politician
- Jon Worth (born 1980), political blogger, journalist and editor
- Jon Worthington (born 1983), English footballer
- Jon Wozencroft (born 1958), English graphic designer, author and instructor
- Jon Wray (born 1970), English rugby league footballer
- Jon Wright, multiple people
- Jon Wurster (born 1966), American drummer
- Jon Wyatt (born 1973), British field hockey player
- Jon Wynne-Tyson (1924–2020), English author and publisher
- Jon Yarbrough (born 1956/1957), American businessperson
- Jon Z (born 1991), Puerto Rican rapper, singer and record producer
- Jon Zabala (born 1996), Spanish rugby union player
- Jon Zazula (1952–2022), American music industry executive
- Jon Zens, American writer and theologian
- Jon Zogg (born 1960), American football player
- Jon Zuber (born 1969), American baseball player

== Fictional characters ==
- Jon, in the animated comedy series Eddsworld
- Jon Arbuckle, Garfield's owner
- Jon Cassidy, a dinoboy from Dino Ranch
- Jon Snow (character), a character in A Song of Ice and Fire book series and its television adaptation Game of Thrones
- Jon Irenicus, the main villain in the role-playing video game Baldur's Gate II: Shadows of Amn

== See also ==
- John (given name)
- Jonathan (name)
- Jón
- Jon (Albanian name)
- Jon (disambiguation)
