= Jon Snodgrass =

Jon Snodgrass may refer to:

- Jon Snodgrass (sociologist)
- Jon Snodgrass (musician)

== See also ==
- John Snodgrass (disambiguation)
