= Magnussen =

Magnussen is a surname. Notable people with the surname include:

- Arne Magnussen (1884–1970), Norwegian trade unionist, newspaper editor and politician
- Billy Magnussen (born 1985), American actor
- Bjørn Magnussen (born 1998), Norwegian speed skater
- Davur Juul Magnussen, Faroese trombonist
- Einar Magnussen (1931–2004), Norwegian economist and politician
- Fritz Magnussen (1878–1920), Danish film director and screenwriter
- Harro Magnussen (1861–1908), German sculptor
- James Magnussen (born 1991), Australian swimmer
- Jan Magnussen (born 1973), Danish racing driver
- Jon Magnussen (born 1959), Norwegian academic
- Karen Magnussen, OC (born 1952), Canadian figure skater
- Karin Magnussen (1908–1997), German biologist, teacher and researcher
- Kevin Magnussen (born 1992), Danish racing driver
- Ryan Magnussen, American businessperson and media entrepreneur
- Trond Magnussen (born 1973), Norwegian ice hockey player
- Ulf Magnussen (born 1946), Norwegian handball player

== Fictional characters ==
- Charles Augustus Magnussen, a character in the television series Sherlock

== See also ==
- Murder of Martine Vik Magnussen involves the rape and murder of a 23-year-old Norwegian female business student, Martine Vik Magnussen
- Magnusson (disambiguation)
