= John Levy =

John Levy may refer to:

- John Levy (musician) (1912–2012), American jazz double-bassist and businessman
- John Levy (philosopher) (died 1976), British mystic, artist, and musician

== See also ==
- Jon Levy (disambiguation)
