= Jon (Albanian name) =

- Pronunciation: Albanian: [jɔn]
- Gender: Male
- Language: Illyrian, Latin, Greek, Albanian

Origin
- Origin: Illyrian
- Meaning: From Ionius son of Dyrrachus

Other names
- Variant forms: ᾿Ιόνιος (greek); Iŏnius (latin); Ionio (Italian)
- Cognate: Ionian Sea

Jon was the son of Dyrrachus and grandson of Epidamnus, barbarian king who founded the village of Epidamnus that, standing to Appian of Alexandria was erroneously mistake with Durrës.

In his Roman History, Appian shortly tells the legend around Jon who was accidentally killed by Heracles, who was fighting along with Dyrrachus for the foundation of the territory of Durrës. Heracles celebrated Jon's funeral by laying his body on the sea that took his name, Ionian Sea.

== See also ==
- Jon, shortened form of the name Jonathan
- John (given name)
- Jonathan (name)
- Jón
