= Jon Landry (disambiguation) =

Jon Landry may refer to:

- Jon Landry, Canadian ice hockey player
- Jon Landry, lead vocalist of the Canadian band The Stanfields
- Jonathan Landry, drummer of the Canadian band Story Untold

== See also ==
- John Landry, Canadian country musician
- John Landry (actor), British actor
