= Jon Thares Davidann =

U.S.-East Asian Historian

Jon Thares Davidann is a U.S.-East Asian historian specializing in intellectual history. He is professor and Chair of Department of History, Humanities and International Studies at Hawai'i Pacific University.

== Career ==
He began his career at Hawai'i Pacific University in 1997. He also served as the Director of Exchange and Study Abroad Programs at HPU for five years from 2007–2012. His residence in the multicultural milieu of Hawai'i and many travels to East Asia convinced him that traditional narratives of westernization were Eurocentric and mistaken.

As a result, in 2019, he published The Limits of Westernization: American and East Asian Intellectuals Create Modernity, 1860–1960, an extended critique of westernization. The work won the Kenneth Baldridge Prize in 2020.

Davidann published the essay "The Myth of Westernization" in Aeon Magazine in 2021.

Davidann has published six books and 30 articles and essays. He has served as a visiting fellow at Oxford University and as a Fulbright Specialist at Ghent University in Ghent, Belgium and is affiliated researcher there. He has given numerous keynote and invited lectures internationally.

He has served as guest editor of the Journal of American-East Asian Relations.

Davidann hosts a video podcast, History Lens, that discusses current concerns such as impeachment, white supremacy, immigration, gun control, and taxes, and puts them in historical perspective.

== Books ==
- A World of Crisis and Progress: The American YMCA in Japan, 1890-1930. Lehigh University Press. 1998. ISBN 978-0-934223-43-0.
- Trans-Pacific Relations: America, Europe, and Asia in the Twentieth Century, edited by Jon Davidann, Richard Jensen, and Yone Sugita, 2003.
- Cultural Diplomacy in U.S.-Japanese Relations, 1919-1941. Springer. November 26, 2007. ISBN 978-0-230-60973-0.
- David, John Thares, ed. (August 20, 2008). Hawaii at the Crossroads of the U.S. and Japan before the Pacific War. University of Hawaii Press. ISBN 978-0-8248-6275-6.
- The Limits of Westernization: American and East Asian Intellectuals Create Modernity, 1860 – 1960. Routledge. July 11, 2018. ISBN 978-1-351-65588-0.
- Davidann, Jon; Gilbert, Marc Jason (February 8, 2019). Cross-Cultural Encounters in Modern World History, 1453-Present. Routledge. ISBN 978-0-429-75924-6.
