= Jon Sinton =

American serial media entrepreneur

Jon Sinton is an American serial media entrepreneur working in the radio, television and online industries.

== Early life ==
Jon graduated from Upper Arlington High School in Columbus Ohio in 1972 where he was active in student government.

== Early career ==
Sinton's early radio career was as a program director moving from WIOT in Toledo, Ohio to KDKB in Phoenix, Arizona in 1978. By the 1980s he became a radio consultant and vice-president of research and development for the Atlanta-based Burkhart/Abrams consulting company.

By the 1990s he started his own consulting company, Sinton, Barnes and Associates. In 1994 he worked to get Jim Hightower, a populist radio host, a syndicated radio show, to counterbalance conservative host Rush Limbaugh.

== Air America ==
In 2003 he began a venture to start a liberal-leaning radio network. That station would become Air America.

Sinton would later use his clout in the radio industry to become outspoken against the Fairness Doctrine

== Progressive Voices Institute, Inc. ==
In 2011, recognizing that progressives would never catch up on conservative-dominated talk radio or cable television, Sinton and original Air America sales director, Reed Haggard, were joined by online specialist George Vasilopoulos, in starting the non-profit Progressive Voices Institute, Inc. PVI's first educational project is a progressive portal that aggregates all progressive video, audio, and written word in a smartphone application called Progressive Voices App. PV App is an attempt to leverage the burgeoning Mobile internet revolution, and create a Progressive Media Universe on that platform.
