= Jon Deeks =

English biostatistician

Jon Deeks is a professor of biostatistics at the University of Birmingham, England. He was elected a Fellow of the Academy of Medical Sciences in 2021.
