= Jon Paul Puno =

American film director

- Born: 1985 (age 40–41); San Francisco, California, United States
- Education: University of Southern California
- Occupations: Filmmaker, singer
- Notable work: Director of "Peace Grows" (2004) and "Valle de Lágrimas" (2006)
- Website: http://www.jonpaulpuno.com

Jon Paul Puno (born 1985) is an American filmmaker and classical crossover singer. As a filmmaker, he has directed films such as Valle de Lágrimas (2006) and Peace Grows (2004). And also played a small role in the 2006 movie I Will Always Love You (film).

At the young age of 16 Puno created the Peace Grows! documentary which was latterly selected in various film festivals in the US and beyond including the International Festival of Human Rights of Barcelona, Spain, Mill Valley Film Festival, Atlanta Film Festival, Austin Film Festival and Nosotros American Latino Film Festival. Later Puno graduated from the University of Southern California School of Cinematic Arts and went on to direct the film "Valle de Lágrimas" in 2006.
