= Jon Hummel =

Australian rules footballer

Personal information
- Full name: Johann Hummel
- Born: 31 January 1957 (age 69)
- Original team: North Blackburn
- Height: 177 cm (5 ft 10 in)
- Weight: 72 kg (159 lb)

Playing career^{1}
Years	Club	Games (Goals)
1977–1978	Richmond	9 (7)
1979	South Melbourne	14 (20)
1980	Collingwood	3 (4)
Total		26 (31)
- ^{1} Playing statistics correct to the end of 1980.

Johann "Jon" Hummel (born 31 January 1957) is a former Australian rules footballer who played with Richmond, South Melbourne and Collingwood in the Victorian Football League (VFL).

Recruited from North Blackburn, Hummel was a member of Richmond's 1977 VFL reserves premiership team and also played seven senior games that season. After making just two appearances in 1978, Hummel made his way to South Melbourne and kicked five goals on debut for his new club, against Hawthorn at Waverley Park. He played 13 more games for South Melbourne and then switched to Collingwood, where he would play only three times. The rover then joined the Werribee Football Club.
