= Jon A. Ballis =

Law firm chairman (born 1970)

Jon Ballis
- Born: May 30, 1969 (age 56)
- Education: Lehigh University (BA); Harvard University (JD)

Jon A. Ballis is the chairman of Kirkland & Ellis, the largest law firm in the world by revenue. In 2018 Ballis was named to succeed Jeffrey Hammes as chairman beginning in February, 2020.

== Early life and education ==
Ballis grew up in the Chicago area. Ballis attended Highland Park High School, where he played basketball with Jonathan Gray, now COO of Blackstone Inc. In 1987, Ballis went to attend Lehigh University in Bethlehem, Pennsylvania, graduating with High Honors in 1991. He then matriculated to Harvard Law School, graduating cum laude in 1994.

== Career ==
Ballis began working at law firm Sidley Austin in 1994 and earned partner in 2002. He joined Kirkland & Ellis as a partner in 2005. At Kirkland & Ellis he has concentrated on private equity deals. He has handled legal services for major private equity companies including Bain, Blackstone, Centerbridge, Cerberus, Hellman & Friedman, KKR, Madison Dearborn, Pritzker Group, Silver Lake, TPG, and Thomas H. Lee.

As chairman he has continued Kirkland & Ellis's increasing focus on advising private equity deals and poaching revenue producing lawyers from other firms by incentivizing them with high pay.
