= Jon Jaylo =

Filipino surrealist painter (born 1975)

- Born: Jon Jaylo; Philippines
- Known for: Painting (Visual Artist)

Jon Jaylo (born July 1975) is a Filipino surrealist painter, now based in New York City, USA.

== Early life ==
Jon Jaylo was born in Manila, Philippines in 1975. His family moved to Chicago, Illinois to finish his grade school, but he returned to the Philippines after graduating, to study Advertising at Far Eastern University.

== Career ==
Jaylo began creating art when he was four years old. He cites among his artistic influences René Magritte, Paul Delvaux, Gustav Klimt, Frida Kahlo, Salvador Dalí and William Bouguereau.

== Exhibitions ==
- Kaboo Del Mar Music Festival & Art Fair, Distinction Gallery, San Diego, California, September 2018
- If Our Days Won't Last, Group show curated by Jon Jaylo, Distinction Gallery, Escondido, California, 11 November - 2 December 2017
- If Our Own Words Fail, Group show curated by Jon Jaylo, BeinArt Gallery, Brunswick, Australia, 12 March - 2 April 2017
- To End An Echo, Solo Show, BeinArt Gallery, Brunswick, Australia, 12 March - 2 April 2017
- The Eleventh Annual Blab, Group Show, Copro Gallery, Santa Monica, California, 10 September - 1 October 2016
- All These Answers That May Never Come Our Way, Solo Show, Distinction Gallery, California Center for the Arts Escondido, California, 23 September - 13 November 2016
- Small Works 2016, Group Show, BeinArt Gallery, Brunswick, Australia, 17 September - 9 October 2016
- Beinart Surreal Art Show 2016, Group Show, Copro Gallery, Santa Monica, California, 20 February - 12 March 2016
- LA Art Show 2016, Group Show, Distinction Gallery, LA Art Show 2016 Modern Contemporary, California, USA, 27–31 January 2016
- As The Moon Draws Water, Solo Show, Distinction Gallery, Escondido, California, 12 September - 3 October 2015
- Nightmare In Wonderland Project Part II, Group Show, ArtHatch and Distinction Gallery, Escondido, California, USA, 11 April - 2 May 2015
- MI ART 2015, Primo Marella Gallery, Group Show, Milan, Italy, 10–12 April 2015
- Daydreams, Books & Oddities, Solo Show, J Studio, Taguig, Philippines, 31 January 2015
- Scope Miami Beach 2014 International Contemporary Art Show, Group Show, Florida, USA, 2–7 December 2014
- Chrysalis, Solo Show, West Gallery, Ayala Museum, Makati, The Philippines, 23 August - 3 September 2014
- Distinction's 10th Year Anniversary, Group Show, ArtHatch and Distinction Gallery, Escondido, California, USA, 11 June - 3 July 2014
- Enigma, Solo Show, Primae Noctis Art Gallery, Lugano, Switzerland, 8 May 2014
- Mad Hatters, Group Show, Flower Pepper Gallery, Group Show, Pasadena, California, November 2013
- Here Be Dragons, Artworks, Canvas & West Gallery, Ayala Museum, Makati, The Philippines, September 2013
- Cabinet of Curiosities, Solo Show, Ernst & Youngs S1 Raffles Quay, North Tower, Singapore, 29 November 2013 - 28 February 2014
- Vanishing Folklore, Solo Show, Strychnin Gallery, Berlin, Germany, August 2012
- Duo, Solo Show, West Gallery & Ayala Museum, ArtistSpace, second floor, Glass Lane, Ayala Museum, Makati Ave. cor. Dela Rosa St., Greenbelt Park, Makati, Philippines, 1–14 August 2012
- Reverie & Odyssey, Solo Show, Artesan Gallery, Singapore, April 2012
- Painted Sound, Group Show, Flower Pepper Gallery, Pasadena, California, January 2012
- Art Fair - Blooom, Group Show, Strychnin Gallery, Staatenhaus am Rheinpark, Cologne, Germany, October 2011
- Mirage, Solo Show, West Gallery & Ayala Museum, Greenbelt Park, Makati, Philippines, July 2011
- Dystopia, Group Show, Copro Gallery, Santa Monica, California, USA, 19 March 2011
- The Pillars of the Earth: A Tribute to the Masters, Group Show, Distinction Gallery, Escondido, California, 12 March 2011
- The Mad Potters Tea Party, Group Show, Strychnin Gallery, Berlin, Germany, 4 February 2011
- To Unmask an Enigma, Solo Show, Strychnin Gallery, Berlin, Germany, 8 October 2010
- Art Fair 21 Strychnin Bloom, Group Show, Strychnin Gallery, Cologne, Germany, October 2010
- Metamorphosis, Group Show, Copro Gallery, Santa Monica, California, 5 June 2010
- Theatre of Reveries, Solo Show, West Gallery, Quezon City, Philippines, 22 June 2010
- Canvas, Group Show, Everyday Filipino Heroes, Vargas Museum, Quezon City, Philippines, 1 May 2010
- 7 Year Itch, Group Show, Strychnin Gallery, Berlin, Germany, 12 February 2010
- Art 2 Heart, Group Show, Teehankee Foundation, 4/F, Ateneo Schools, Rockwell, Makati, Philippines, 19 December 2009
- Chaos & Harmony, Unit 2C - 05 2F Shops At Serendra, Fort Bonifacio Global City, Philippines, 9 Dec 2009
- Art For Youth's Sake, Southwing Lobby House of Representatives, Quezon City, Philippines, 16 November 2009
- Magistrates, Strychnin Gallery, Berlin, Germany, 13 November 2009
- Tabi Tabi Po, Group Show, 1AM Gallery, San Francisco, California, 13 November 2009
- Illusional Disfunction, Boston Gallery, Cubao, Quezon City, Philippines, 8 August 2009
- Iskwalado, Galerie Anna, SM Megamall, Philippines, 24 July 2009
- Idle Minds, West Gallery, Quezon City, Philippines, 10 July 2009
- Kunstart '09, 6th Intl. Art Fair of Bolzano, Bozen, Italy, 21 May 2009
- Seeing You, Seeing Me, Manila Contemporary White Space, Pasong Tamo Extension, The Philippines, 16 May 2009
- Berlin Show, Strychnin Gallery, Boxhagenerstrasse, Berlin, Germany, 6 February 2009
- Twelve By Nine, West Gallery, SM Megamall, The Philippines, 8 Jan 2009
- Uiwang International Placard Art Festival, Samdong Uiwang City, Kyunggido, South Korea, 3 Oct 2008
- Beyond Borders III, ArtSpace Royal Plaza On Scotts, Singapore, 2 October 2008
- ART 40, Pinto Art Gallery, Rizal, The Philippines, 20 July 2008
- Unexamined Failure, West Gallery, Quezon City, The Philippines, 17 June 2008
- Beautiful Sins, ARTASIA Gallery, The Philippines, 23 April 2008
- Rekindle, Blanc Gallery, Makati, The Philippines, 7 April 2008
- Florante At Laura, U.P. Vargas Museum, Quezon City, The Philippines, 8 February 2008
- December Show, Blanc Gallery, Makati, The Philippines, 4 Dec 2007
- Peculiar People, Tintero Gallery, Quezon City, The Philippines, 30 Oct 2007
- Boxed, Cultural Center of the Philippines, The Philippines, 26 April 2007
