= Jon Onye Lockard =

American artist (1932-2015)

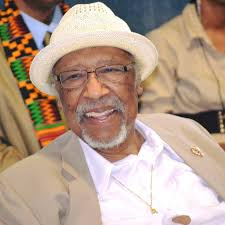
- Lockard in 2013
- Born: January 25, 1932; Detroit, Michigan, U.S.
- Died: March 25, 2015 (aged 83); Ypsilanti, Michigan
- Other names: "Onye", "Onye Eje"
- Occupations: muralist, painter, professor, historian, activist

Jon Onye Lockard (January 25, 1932 – March 25, 2015) was an American muralist, painter, professor, historian, and activist. Lockard's early-to-mid career was centered around the Black Arts Movement of the 1960s and 1970s. He was a founding faculty member of the Department of Afro-American and African Studies at the University of Michigan in Ann Arbor. Additionally, he served as a senior art advisor for the installation of the Martin Luther King Jr. Memorial in Washington, D.C.

After witnessing the founding of the AfriCOBRA group at Jeff Donaldson's CONFABA in 1967, Lockard adopted the name "Onye" after "Onye Eje", meaning "artistic traveler" in the Igbo language. He went on to become a life-long member of the National Conference of Artists after serving as president. His artwork is known to have been in the private collections of prominent public figures such as Gwendolyn Brooks, George Benson, Jacob Javits, Coleman Young, Sidney Poitier, and James Earl Jones.

== Early life ==
Lockard was born to Lillian Jones and Cecil E. Lockard on January 25, 1932, in Detroit, Michigan's east side. Both Lockard's parents were from the South; Jones hailing from Port Arthur, Mississippi and Lockard from Marianna, Arkansas.
