= Jon Thomas =

Jon Thomas may refer to:

- Jon Thomas (politician) (1939–2013), U.S. politician from Florida
- Jon T. Thomas (born 1967), United States Air Force general
- Jon R. Thomas (1946–2017), U.S. government official
