= Jon Kvist =

Danish researcher and author (born 1967)

Jon Kvist (born 6 January 1967) is a Danish researcher and author. He is a professor at the Institute of Society and Globalization, at the Roskilde University, as well as a member of the Nordic Centre of Excellence on Reassessing the Nordic Welfare Model.

== Biography ==
Kvist is the son of a teacher and a psychiatrist. He studied at the University of Odense in Denmark and at the University of Edinburgh in Scotland. From 1998 to 2008, Kvist was a senior researcher for the Danish National Institute of Social Research. In 2002, Kvist co-founded ESPAnet, the European network of Social Policy Analysts, a group of academics who study European social policy. He was a member of its board until 2008.

He is currently a member of the editorial board of the Journal of European Social Policy.

Kvist was on the Expert Group on Welfare in an Independent Scotland set down by the Scottish Government 2013–2014.

Currently, Kvist is on the Danish Government Commission on Unemployment Insurance (Dagpengekommissionen) that is to analyse and recommend reform of the unemployment insurance system.

Kvist is also member of the new European Commission European Network on Social Policy.

== Personal life ==
Kvist has two children.

== Bibliography ==
- Kvist, Jon, Johan Fritzel, Bjørn Hvinden & Olli Kangas (2012) (eds.). Changing Social Equality: The Nordic welfare model in the 21st century. Bristol : The Policy Press.
- Saari, Juho & Kvist, Jon (eds.) (2007). The Europeanisation of social protection. Bristol: Policy Press.
- Kautto, Mikko, Johan Fritzell, Bjørn Hvinden, Jon Kvist & Hannu Uusitalo (eds.) (2001). Nordic Welfare States in the European Context. London: Routledge.
- Ploug, Niels & Jon Kvist (1996). Social Security in Europe. Development or Dismantlement? Deventer: Kluwer Law and Taxation Publishers.
