= Jon Lemmon =

American soccer player

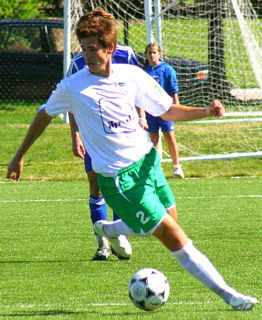

Personal information
- Date of birth: December 28, 1984 (age 41)
- Place of birth: Lawrence, Kansas, United States
- Height: 6 ft 2 in (1.88 m)
- Positions: Midfielder; forward

College career
Years	Team	Apps	(Gls)
2005–2008	MidAmerica Nazarene Pioneers		

Senior career*
Years	Team	Apps	(Gls)
2007–2008	Cleveland City Stars		
2009–2010	HNK Primorac	0	(0)
- * Club domestic league appearances and goals as of 24 October 2009

Jonathan Brooks Lemmon (born December 28, 1984, in Lawrence, Kansas) is an American soccer player.

Although he grew up in Lawrence, KS, Lemmon played high school soccer at Maranatha Academy High School in Shawnee, Kansas, college soccer at MidAmerica Nazarene University, and in the USL for Cleveland City Stars and now with HNK Primorac. He is in the Kansas Sports Hall of Fame, holds the Kansas scoring record with 96 goals and 39 assists in 54 games. He also holds the Maranatha single season scoring record with 39 goals. Selected as an All American and the Heart of America Athletic Conference Offensive Player of the Year in 2008.

== Sources ==
- Heart of America Athletic Conference
- MidAmerica Nazarene University Soccer Roster
- Kansas State Soccer Hall of Fame
