= Jon C. Madonna =

American businessman (died 2018)

Jon C. Madonna was chairman and chief executive officer of KPMG (a professional services firm), in New York City. He was with KPMG for 28 years, where he held numerous senior leadership positions throughout his career, including chairman from 1990 to 1996. Subsequent to his retirement from KPMG in 1996, Madonna served as vice chairman of Travelers Group, Inc. from 1997 to 1998, and president and chief executive officer of CWT Corporate Travel, Inc. from 1999 to 2000. He was chief executive officer of DigitalThink, Inc. from 2001 to 2002 and chairman of DigitalThink, Inc. from April 2002 to May 2004. Madonna was a director of AT&T Inc., Phelps Dodge Corporation, Tidewater Inc. and Visa U.S.A. Inc.

Madonna died on May 30, 2018.
