= Jon Lufkin =

American cross-country skier (born 1947)

Personal information
- Born: July 9, 1947 Rumford, Maine, United States
- Died: September 28, 2024 (aged 77)

Sport
- Sport: Cross-country skiing

Jon Lufkin (July 9, 1947 – September 28, 2024) was an American cross-country skier. He competed in the men's 30 kilometre event at the 1968 Winter Olympics.
