= Jon Maner =

American social psychologist, professor at Florida State University

- Education: Arizona State University (PhD); University of Virginia (MA, BA)
- Known for: evolutionary approach to social cognition and social hierarchy
- Awards: 2013 American Psychological Association Distinguished Scientific Award APA Distinguished Scientific Award for an Early Career Contribution to Psychology, 2009 Developing Scholar Award for outstanding research and creative activity
- Scientific career
- Fields: Social psychology, Evolutionary psychology
- Workplaces: Florida State University; Kellogg School of Management

Jon K. Maner is an American social psychologist and professor in the Department of Psychology at Florida State University. His research focuses on evolutionary psychology, particularly in areas of social hierarchy, social cognition, close relationships, and self-protective processes.

== Education and career ==
Jon K. Maner earned his A.B. in Psychology and Philosophy and his M.A. from the University of Virginia, followed by a Ph.D. in Social Psychology from Arizona State University in 2003.

Maner began his academic career as an assistant professor at Florida State University in 2003, where he became a full professor in 2017. He has also held positions at Northwestern University, including the James J. O'Connor Professorship of Management and Organizations (2014–2017). Additionally, Maner served as the director of graduate studies for the Department of Psychology at FSU from 2022 onwards.

He is a fellow of the Society for Personality and Social Psychology and the Association for Psychological Science. Maner received a Distinguished Scientific Award for Early Career Contribution to Psychology from American Psychological Association in 2013.

== Research interests and contributions ==
Maner’s research spans multiple areas of social psychology, including social hierarchy, intimate relationships, social affiliation, and self-protective motives. He examines how psychological mechanisms related to power, affiliation, mating, and fear are shaped by evolution and, in turn, influence human behavior.

=== Social hierarchy ===
Maner's work investigates dominance, prestige, power, and leadership strategies within social groups. He has significantly contributed to understanding the psychology of social dominance and prestige.

=== Close relationships ===
Maner explores romantic attraction, relationship maintenance, and infidelity from an evolutionary perspective. His work on hormonal cues, attraction, and mating cognitions has been influential, including research on effects of ovulation cues on male behavior, and on sexual overperception.

=== Social affiliation and rejection ===
Maner studies how social exclusion and inclusion influence interpersonal behavior, showing that social exclusion can motivate reconnection.

=== Self-protective processes ===
Maner's research also examines how fear, anxiety, disgust, and threat responses shape human interactions.

== Personal ==
In his free time, Jon Maner bikes and runs marathons.
