= John Snodgrass =

John Snodgrass may refer to:

- John F. Snodgrass (1804–1854), U.S. Representative from Virginia
- John Snodgrass (diplomat) (1928–2008), British diplomat
- John James Snodgrass (1796–1841), British military officer

== See also ==
- Jon Snodgrass (disambiguation)
