= Jon Spinogatti =

American television and film actor

- Born: Jon Spinogatti; United States
- Occupation: Actor
- Years active: 2004-present

Jon Spinogatti is an American television and film actor. Spinogatti had roles in The Wolf of Wall Street, Numb3rs, Desperate Housewives, Strong Medicine, Over There, Gilmore Girls, and ER.

== Filmography ==
Year	Title	Role	Notes
2013	The Wolf of Wall Street	Nicholas the Butler	
2010	Detective Force	Sebastian	
2008	Crossroads	Priest	
2006	Numb3rs	Motel Manager	
2006	Desperate Housewives	MRI Technician	
2005	Over There	Teacher	
2005	Gilmore Girls	Frankie	
2005	ER	Obnoxious Bald Guy	
