= Jon Fuller =

American academic and medical doctor

Dr. Jon D. Fuller, S.J., is a Jesuit priest, a medical doctor who works with AIDS patients, and a professor.

== Education ==
Fuller studied at the University of California, San Diego School of Medicine and was graduated in 1983.

== Medical career ==
Fuller is known for his work with HIV/AIDS patients. He did his residency at the San Francisco General Hospital in 1986. He was also a resident with the Boston Visiting Nurse Association in 1993. He is board certified in family practice. He was the founding president of the National Catholic AIDS Network. He is assistant director of the Adult AIDS Program at Boston Medical Center.

== Teaching career ==
Fuller teaches at Harvard Divinity School, the Boston University School of Medicine, and is the first Margaret E. Pyne Professor of Pastoral Studies at Weston Jesuit School of Theology.
