= Jon Western =

American political scientist (1963–2022)

- Born: 1963; Bismarck, North Dakota
- Died: January 29, 2022; Florence, Massachusetts
- Education: Macalester College (BA); University of Michigan (MPP); Columbia University (PhD)
- Scientific career
- Fields: International Studies
- Institutions: Mount Holyoke College

Jon Western (1963 – January 29, 2022) was an American political scientist who was the Carol Hoffmann Collins '63 Professor of International Relations and Five College Professor of International Relations at Mount Holyoke College and the Five Colleges. He served as vice president for Academic Affairs and Dean of Faculty at Mount Holyoke from 2016 to 2020. He received his B.A. in Political Science and Russian Area Studies from Macalester College, his M.P.P. from the University of Michigan, and his Ph.D. in political science from Columbia University.

== Mount Holyoke College ==
As Vice President for Academic Affairs and Dean of Faculty at Mount Holyoke College from 2016 to 2020, Western served as the college's chief academic officer. He co-led the college's 10-year reaccreditation for the New England Association of Schools and Colleges and the launch of the college's Plan for 2023 strategic plan and its first-ever implementation plan; he led the expansion of the tenure track faculty including the recruitment and hiring of 43 tenure-track faculty in four years and launched new policies on diversity, equity, and inclusion for faculty searches; he oversaw the development of the Fimbel Maker and Innovation Lab; he launched new enrollment management policies to reduce class sizes across the curriculum resulting in an increase from 65% to 75% of classes campus-wide under 20 students. During Western's tenure, the college developed a new department and major in film, Media, and Theater within new investments in a film production and acting studio, a new Data Science major, and a new minor in Organization, Entrepreneurship and Society. The college also established new initiatives around sustainability including a goal of Carbon Neutrality by 2037. In 2020, Western co-led the campus COVID-19 Pandemic Response and the transition of the curriculum and curricular support structures to remote on-line learning and oversaw the faculty adoption of the college's Flexible Immersive Teaching model to ensure equity and access to students accessing the curriculum from on-campus and from remote learning environments around the world.

== Bosnian War ==
Jon Western was an analyst who worked on Balkans and East Europe in the U.S. State Department's Bureau of Intelligence and Research in 1992, when hostilities broke out in the Bosnian War. Western and his colleagues at the State Department and CIA found substantial, corroborated evidence of war crimes (including ethnic cleansing) committed by parties to the conflict, but were unable to convince their superiors to alter U.S. policy toward the war and its belligerents.

As a result, Western resigned on August 6, 1993. This was one week after Marshall Freeman Harris, the State Department's "chief specialist on Bosnia" had resigned, and two weeks before Stephen Walker, desk officer for Croatia resigned also in protest of American policy.

According to Samantha Power in her book, "A Problem from Hell": America and the Age of Genocide, "it was the largest wave of resignations in State Department history. The departure of so many promising young officers reflected a degree of despair but also a capacity for disappointment among officials not evident in... previous genocides."

== Books ==
- The International Community and Statebuilding: Getting Its Act Together? (co-editor, 2012)
- Global Giant: Is China Changing the Rules of the Game? (co-editor, 2009)
- Selling Intervention and War: The Presidency, the Media and the American Public (2005)
