= Jonathan Klein =

Jonathan or Jon Klein may refer to:

- Jonathan Philip Klein (1956–2016), American dog behavior expert
- Jonathan Klein (Getty Images) (born 1960), founder of Getty Images
- Jonathan Klein (racing driver) (born 1987), American racing driver in Indy Lights
- Jon Klein (CNN) (born 1958), former president of the American television news network CNN
- Jon Klein (musician) (born 1960), English guitarist, producer and member of Siouxsie and the Banshees
- Jonathan Klein (actor), starring in The Bacchae
- Jon Klein (playwright), American playwright, see ACT Theatre
- Jonathan Klein, co-founder of production company New Generation Pictures
- Jonathan Klein, sound editor for The Mummy Returns
