= Jon Levisohn =

American academic

- Education: Harvard University
- Occupation: Academic

Jon A. Levisohn is an American academic who is the Jack, Joseph and Morton Mandel Associate Professor of Jewish Educational Thought at Brandeis University. Levisohn is also the director of the Jack, Joseph and Morton Mandel Center for Studies in Jewish Education at Brandeis. He was the chair of the Department of Near Eastern and Judaic Studies until 2024. At Brandeis, he also chairs the Seminar on Contemporary Jewish Life. He is a co-editor of the Mandel-Brandeis Series in Jewish Education.

He is a philosopher of general and religious education. Recent work has focused on how Jews think about the goals of Jewish education. He serves as the host of the Learning About Learning podcast.

== Education ==
- Maimonides School
- Harvard University, BA
- Stanford University, MA
- Stanford University, PhD

== Bibliography ==
=== Books ===
- Jon A. Levisohn and Susan P. Fendrick, eds. Turn it and Turn it Again: Studies in the Teaching and Learning of Classical Jewish Texts. Academic Studies Press, 2013. ISBN 9781936235636.
- Jon A. Levisohn and Jeffrey S. Kress, eds., Advancing the Learning Agenda in Jewish Education. Academic Studies Press, 2018.
- Jon A. Levisohn and Ari Y. Kelman, eds., Beyond Jewish Identity. Academic Studies Press, 2019.
- Jon A. Levisohn, Teaching Historical Narratives: A Philosophical Inquiry into the Virtues of Historical Interpretation. Bloomsbury, 2024.
- Jonathan B. Krasner, Jon A. Levisohn and Sharon Avni, Teaching and Learning in Jewish Day Schools. Brandeis University Press, 2025.
