= Jon Jonsson i Källeräng =

Swedish politician

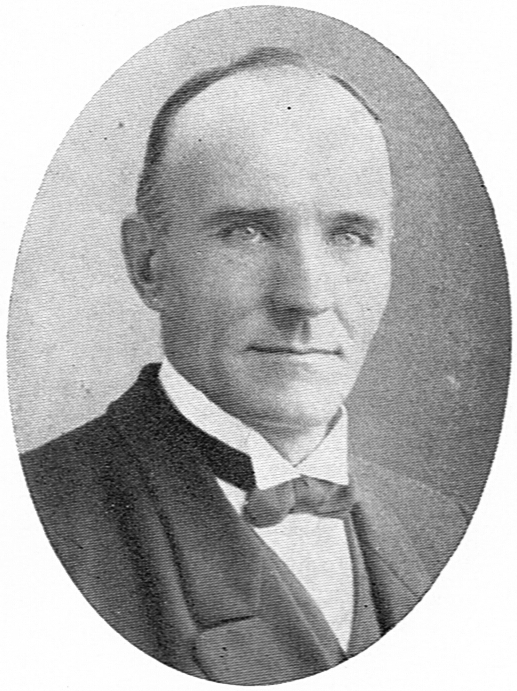
Jon Jonsson SPA 1867 (cropped)

Jon Jonsson i Källeräng (1867–1939) was a Swedish politician. He was a member of the Centre Party.
