= Jon Christensen =

Jon Christensen may refer to:

- Jon Christensen (musician) (1943–2020), Norwegian jazz drummer
- Jon Christensen (journalist) (born 1960), American freelance journalist
- Jon Christensen (politician) (born 1963), American politician and corporate executive

== See also ==
- John Christensen (disambiguation)
