= Jon Narbett =

English footballer

Personal information
- Date of birth: 21 November 1968 (age 57)
- Place of birth: Birmingham, England
- Height: 5 ft 10 in (1.78 m)
- Position: Midfielder

Senior career*
Years	Team	Apps	(Gls)
1986–1988	Shrewsbury Town	26	(3)
1988–1992	Hereford United	149	(31)
1992–1994	Oxford United	15	(0)
1994	Kalmar FF		
1994–1996	Chesterfield	20	(1)
- Kidderminster Harriers
- Evesham United
- Worcester City
- * Club domestic league appearances and goals

Jon Narbett (born 21 November 1968) is an English retired professional footballer who made over 100 appearances for Hereford United. Hereford United paid a then record club transfer fee of £27,500 to Shrewsbury Town for Narbett in December 1988. He scored seven first team goals as a midfielder for Hereford in the 1988–9 season in Division 4 of the Football League. Narbett scored his first League hat-trick in Hereford's 4–2 win over Carlisle United on 15 September 1990 and went on to be United's top goalscorer for the 1990–91 season. Narbett was transferred to Oxford United for £65,000 at the start of 1992–3 season. He also played for Chesterfield and Kalmar before a cruciate knee ligament injury cut his career short in 1996. He tried to resurrect his career by playing non league for Kidderminster Harriers, Evesham United and Worcester City, but eventually retired.

Narbett now lives in Chicago, in the United States of America, working in financial services.
