= Jon Harding =

New Zealand ecologist

Jonathan Sutherland Harding (born 1958) is a freshwater ecologist from New Zealand. He completed a doctorate at the University of Canterbury in 1994, with a thesis on New Zealand's lotic ecoregions. He is a professor emeritus of the University of Canterbury. Harding completed a DSc in 2018 at the University of Canterbury. He served as Dean of Postgraduate Research at Canterbury and was President of the New Zealand Freshwater Sciences Society. Harding is a Senior Fellow of the Higher Education Academy, a member of the Ako Aotearoa Academy and an Honorary member of the New Zealand Freshwater Sciences Society.

== Publications ==
- Harding JS, Benfield EF, Bolstad PV, Helfman GS, Jones EB. Stream biodiversity: the ghost of land use past. Proceedings of the National Academy of Sciences. 1998 Dec 8;95(25):14843-7. According to Google Scholar, this article has been cited 1202 times
- Harding JS, Young RG, Hayes JW, Shearer KA, Stark JD. Changes in agricultural intensity and river health along a river continuum. Freshwater Biology. 1999 Sep;42(2):345-57. According to Google Scholar, it has been cited 272 times.
- Ewers RM, Kliskey AD, Walker S, Rutledge D, Harding JS, Didham RK. Past and future trajectories of forest loss in New Zealand. Biological Conservation. 2006 Dec 1;133(3):312-2. According to Google Scholar, this article has been cited 217 times
- Buss DF, Carlisle DM, Chon TS, Culp J, Harding JS, Keizer-Vlek HE, Robinson WA, Strachan S, Thirion C, Hughes RM. Stream biomonitoring using macroinvertebrates around the globe: a comparison of large-scale programs. Environmental Monitoring and Assessment. 2015 Jan;187(1):1–21 According to Google Scholar, this article has been cited 201 times
- Burdon FJ, McIntosh AR, Harding JS. Habitat loss drives threshold response of benthic invertebrate communities to deposited sediment in agricultural streams. Ecological Applications. 2013 Jul;23(5):1036–47. According to Google Scholar, this article has been cited 176 times
- Hogsden KL, Harding JS. Consequences of acid mine drainage for the structure and function of benthic stream communities: a review. Freshwater Science. 2012 Mar;31(1):108-20.According to Google Scholar, this article has been cited 172 times
