= Jon Peterson =

Jon Peterson may refer to:

- Jon Peterson (politician), member of the Ohio House of Representatives
- Jon Peterson (artist) (born 1945), American artist
