= Jon Ander =

Jon Ander may refer to:

- Jon Ander (footballer, born 1990), Spanish football forward
- Jon Ander (footballer, born 1995), Spanish football goalkeeper
