= Jonathan Morgan =

Jonathan or Jon Morgan may refer to:

- Jonathan Morgan (director) (born 1966), director and former actor in pornographic films
- Jonathan Morgan (politician) (born 1974), Welsh Conservative politician
- Jonathan Morgan (footballer), English football coach and former player
- Jon Morgan (footballer), Welsh footballer
- Jon Morgan (New Hampshire politician), member of the New Hampshire Senate
- Jonathan Morgan (badminton) (born 1979), Welsh badminton player
