= Jon Michael Varese =

American novelist and literary historian (born 1971)

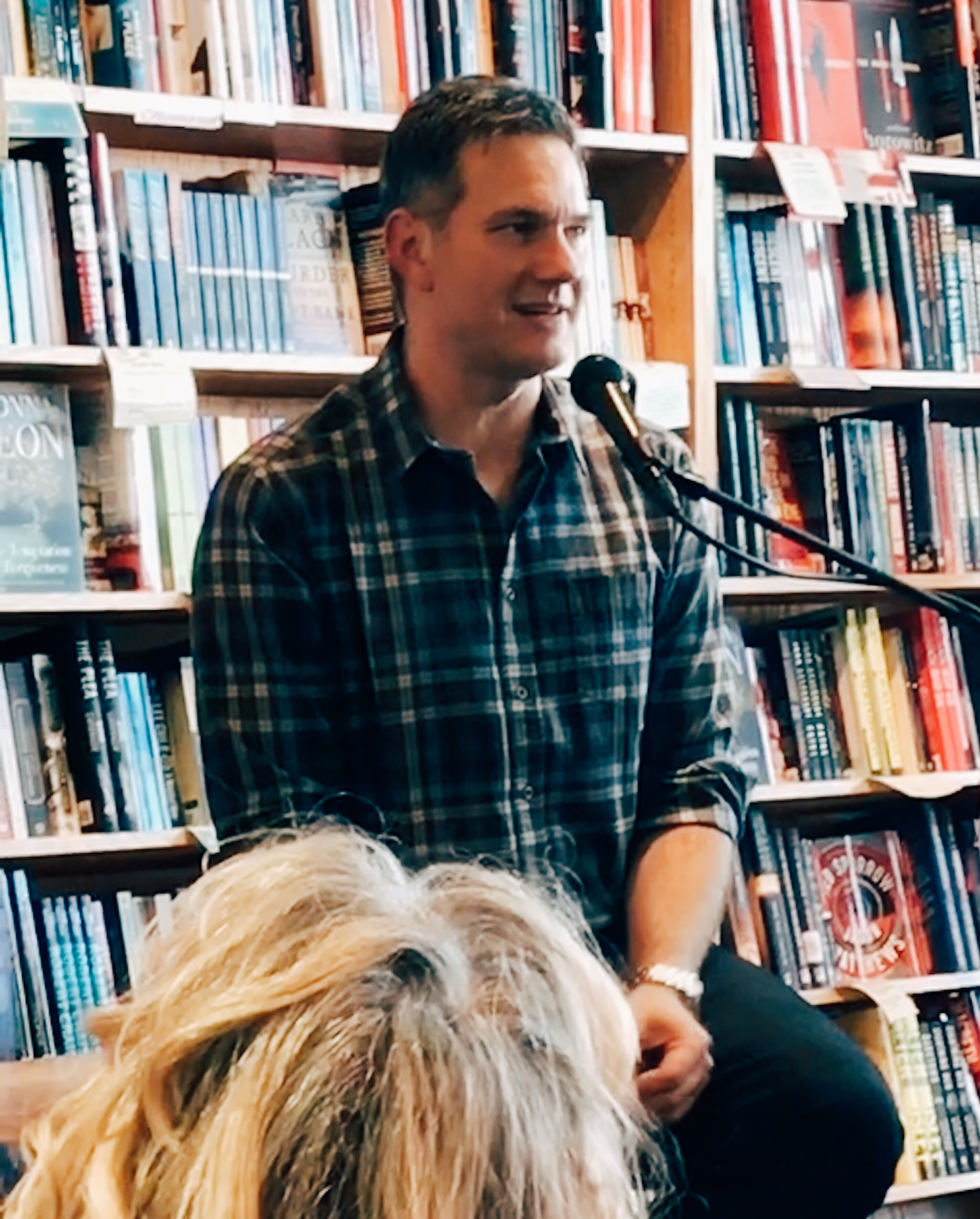
- Varese at Book Passage in San Francisco, July 25, 2018
- Born: December 17, 1971 (age 54); Miami, Florida, U.S.
- Education: Swarthmore College (BA); University of California, Santa Cruz (PhD)
- Writing career
- Genres: Historical Fiction, Gothic Fiction, Magical Realism, Literary History
- Notable work: The Spirit Photographer (2018)
- Website: www.jmvarese.com

Jon Michael Varese (born December 17, 1971) is an American novelist, historian, essayist, educator and technical writer. His 2018 debut novel The Spirit Photographer is set in Reconstruction era Boston, Massachusetts and Louisiana plantation country.

== Early life and education ==
Varese was born in Miami, Florida. He wrote his first story at the age of seven, dictating it to his grandmother, who was the secretary for the City Attorney of Miami. He was first introduced to literature and the work of Charles Dickens at the age of 14 through the mother of a friend.

Varese graduated from Swarthmore College with a B.A. in English Literature, and earned his master's degree and Ph.D. in literature from the University of California, Santa Cruz. His dissertation, The Value of Storytelling (2011), examined the development of 19th-century serial novels in Great Britain, with a focus on the early novels of Charles Dickens, Wilkie Collins, and George Eliot. While finishing the dissertation, Varese worked as a technical writer in Silicon Valley.

== Career ==
=== Fiction ===
Varese's debut novel, The Spirit Photographer (2018), is loosely based on the 19th-century American spirit photographer, William Mumler. Varese drew from Mumler's biography to create an independent novel about a protagonist who was a photographer in Boston after having worked with Mathew Brady during the Civil War to photograph the dead.

One day the photographer sees the face of an African-American woman he knew, who appears as a spirit in a glass-plate photograph of a couple seeking contact with their son who died young. The novel takes place during the Reconstruction era in U.S. history, exploring issues of northern and southern racism in post-Civil War America, and the role of spiritualism in dealing with the widespread grief due to losses during the war. Varese has said that the novel's story was influenced by the work of civil rights activists Bryan Stevenson and Michelle Alexander, who have emphasized the connection between slavery and racial injustice in the US since then.

The Times Literary Supplement said there was not "a dud word in this extraordinary debut novel," and compared Varese's writing to that of Wilkie Collins and Joseph Conrad. Booklist described the novel as "an addicting tale." Chronogram Magazine wrote that it was an ambitious, sprawling debut, "teeming with spirits, secrets, and trauma." PopMatters said that The Spirit Photographer was "atmospheric, lyrical, and poignant", and that it "deftly interweaves strands of history and fantasy."

Varese's second novel, The Company, was published by John Murray in March 2023. The novel is a ghostly thriller based on the true story of arsenic-laced wallpaper in the 19th century. The story follows the Braithwhites, a wealthy family that has run the world's most successful wallpaper firm for over a century, and is narrated by Lucy Braithwhite, the daughter of the family and heir (with her brother John) to the Braithwhite fortune. The novel uses the device of the unreliable narrator to call into question everything that is going on in the book (including the hauntings), and takes inspiration from other 19th-century unreliable female narrators like the governess in Henry James's The Turn of the Screw.

=== Nonfiction and literary criticism ===
Varese's nonfiction and literary criticism have focused on the work of Charles Dickens, particularly Dickens's early novels and the publishing business that supported their development. Varese's edition of Great Expectations was published in 2012 under the Signature imprint of Barnes and Noble publishers.

Similarly, Varese's journalism recasts topics in Victorian literature for general audiences, including a series of pieces that he wrote for The Guardian from 2009 to 2010.

Varese was an original contributor to the Oxford Handbook of Charles Dickens. His chapter on Nicholas Nickleby examined the role of contracts and English contract law in relation to Dickens's fiction during a time when concepts such as copyright, intellectual property, and royalty payments were being developed and debated in both professional and legal spheres.

=== Teaching and outreach work ===
Varese served as the Director of Digital Initiatives for The Dickens Project from 2010 to 2016. Earlier he had directed the development of the Our Mutual Friend Scholarly Pages (1998), a collaborative digital archive co-sponsored by The Dickens Project and the British Broadcasting Corporation (BBC). The collaboration produced one of the first of a few digital archiving projects to be published on the Internet. It was revised for the bi-centenary of Dickens's birth in 2012.

In 2016, Varese was named Director of Public Outreach for The Dickens Project, a role he still occupies. He conducts liaison work between The Dickens Project and the University of Southern California’s Neighborhood Academic Initiative (NAI), USC's primary outreach program to Title 1 schools in South Central Los Angeles. The partnership provides books, curricula advisement, mentorship, and funding for students who are on a dedicated college-bound path as a result of the program.
