= Jon Bakero =

Jon Bakero may refer to:

- Jon Bakero (footballer, born 1971), Spanish retired footballer
- Jon Bakero (footballer, born 1996), Spanish footballer for Phoenix Rising FC
