= Jon Beck Shank =

American poet (1919–1977)

Jon Beck Shank (1919–1977) was an American Mormon poet and a high school English teacher in New York City.

== Biography ==
Shank studied at Brigham Young University. While at BYU, Shank collaborated with Davis Bitton on a theatrical production.

Shank was a native of Pennsylvania and a convert to The Church of Jesus Christ of Latter-day Saints. Shank died in 1977.

In 1945, Shank had a collection of his poems published by Alfred A. Knopf. He later taught high school English in New York City, . Among his students was Roger Rosenblatt, who later wrote an essay praising Mormon artists in which he admitted that this view was largely a result of his association with Shank.

Another of Shank's students was Anne Waldman, who has mentioned him being a scholar of the works of Wallace Stevens.

== Sources ==
- Poetry, Vol. 66, no. 4 July 1945
