= Jon Keighren =

British football commentator

Jon Keighren (born 7 December 1967, in Carlisle) is a football commentator for Stockport County FC and TalkSport. He is also the official commentator for Stockport County Football Club.

Keighren is PR Officer for the Royal British Legion in the north of England. He was previously Head of Media Relations at The University of Manchester, and Head of News and Sport at Signal FM and Imagine FM in Stockport, where he co-hosted the Breakfast Show with Ed James. He is a graduate of Sheffield City Polytechnic and is a member of the Chartered Institute of Public Relations. He is also the co-author of a football book called Get Those Sheep off the Pitch with Phil Staley, a former manager of Accrington Stanley and Macclesfield Town.
