= Jon Urzelai =

Spanish footballer

Personal information
- Full name: Jon Urzelai Inza
- Date of birth: 1 March 1977 (age 49)
- Place of birth: Oñati, Spain
- Height: 1.82 m (5 ft 11 1/2 in)
- Position: Defender

Senior career*
Years	Team	Apps	(Gls)
1995–1999	Real Sociedad B	61	(0)
1999–2000	Novelda	33	(0)
2000–2002	Barakaldo	64	(4)
2002–2004	Eibar	64	(1)
2004–2006	Murcia	42	(0)
2006	Vecindario	13	(0)
2007–2011	Eibar	118	(3)
Total		395	(8)
- * Club domestic league appearances and goals

Jon Urzelai Inza (born 1 March 1977) is a Spanish former professional footballer who played as a defender.

== Club career ==
Urzelai was born in Oñati, Gipuzkoa. He amassed Segunda División totals of 185 matches and two goals over seven seasons, in representation of SD Eibar (four years, two spells), Real Murcia CF (two) and UD Vecindario (one).

In a senior career that spanned 16 years, Urzelai played lower league football with Real Sociedad B, Novelda CF, Barakaldo CF and Eibar. He scored his first goal in the second tier as a member of the latter club, opening a 2–0 home win against Getafe CF on 18 January 2004.
