= Jon Levy =

Jon Levy may refer to:

- Jon Levy (photographer), founder and director of British photography company Foto8
- Jon D. Levy (born 1954), American judge in Maine
- Jon Levy (behavioral scientist), behavior expert and social engineer

== See also ==
- John Levy (disambiguation)
