= Jon Riggs =

Australian rules footballer

Personal information
- Born: 14 November 1962 (age 63)
- Original team: Burnie

Playing career
Years	Club	Games (Goals)
1984–1985	St Kilda	6 (1)

Jon Riggs (born 14 November 1962) is a former Australian rules footballer who played for St Kilda in the Victorian Football League.

Drafted in 1983 from the Burnie Tigers in Tasmania, Riggs was better known as a professional sprinter. He won the Hobart Gift in 1983 and the Esanda burnie Gift ($15000) in 1989. Also played football for West Perth in the WAFL in 1989 and 1990 as well as the Devonport Blues in the TFL in 1991.
