= Jon Kull =

Chemist and academic administrator

F. Jon Kull is the Rodgers Professor of Chemistry and Dean of the Guarini School of Graduate and Advanced Studies at Dartmouth College.

In 1988, Kull graduated magna cum laude with a Bachelor of Arts in chemistry from Dartmouth College. He later received his Doctor of Philosophy in biochemistry from the University of California, San Francisco.

Kull is a structural biologist and biochemist who works on molecular motor proteins and the proteins involved in the regulation of bacterial virulence.

== Selected publications ==
- Endow, Sharyn A.; Kull, F. Jon; Liu, Honglei (15 October 2010). "Kinesins at a glance". Journal of Cell Science. 123 (20): 3420–3424. doi:10.1242/jcs.064113. PMC 2951464. PMID 20930137.
