= Jon Ortner =

American photographer (born 1951)

- Born: Jonathan Ortner; 1951 (age 74–75); Great Neck, New York, U.S.
- Education: University of Kansas
- Occupation: Photographer
- Website: www.ortnerphoto.com

Jon Ortner (born Jonathan Ortner; 1951 in Great Neck, Long Island, New York) is an American photographer known for his work in the Himalaya Mountains of Nepal, Bhutan, and Ladakh. He has photographed and written extensively about southeast Asia, including Cambodia, Myanmar, Thailand, Laos, Bali, Java, and India. He has most recently photographed in the deserts and canyons of the American West. These photos have been collected in Canyon Wilderness of the Southwest. His extensive photography of the American wilderness has been published in Visions of Paradise, American Wilderness. His black and white images of top dancers, athletes and gymnasts was published in the award-winning book Peak of Perfection.

Ortner attended the University of Kansas, in Lawrence, Kansas, where he studied Photography, Systematics and Ecology, and Eastern Philosophy with the Sanskrit scholar Alphonse Verdue. At the age of 20 he made his first journey to India and Nepal where experiences in the Himalaya focused the direction of his photography. In 1978, Ortner moved to Manhattan with his wife Martha McGuire where they opened a commercial studio. His assignment photography has been used in advertising and promotion for corporations and real estate developers.

Ortner's photography in Asia has focused on the highest mountains and deepest gorges on earth, and the meditative philosophies of Hinduism and Buddhism that evolved there. He has led expeditions throughout the Himalaya, some for as long as 65 days. Several of them have been documented in Buddha which has won an IPPY and a ForeWord Book Award. Its introduction was written by Jack Kornfield.

His books combine graphic photography with scholarly and informative text. The importance of pilgrimage, symbolic architecture, and the sacred topography of the Himalaya has been a recurrent theme in both his photography and writings.

Ortner's photographs have been shown at the Nikon, Kodak, and Neikrug Galleries in the United States.

== Bibliography ==
- Visions of Paradise, American Wilderness, ACC Art Books, 2025
- Calendar Girls, 2019, Schiffer Publishing
- Peak of Perfection, Nude Portraits of Dancers, Athletes and Gymnasts 2015 Schiffer Publishing
- Huffington Post Book Review: http://www.huffingtonpost.com/michael-ernest-sweet/photo-book-review-jon-ort_b_7956818.html
- Book Review in ProPhoto Dailey: https://www.ai-ap.com/publications/article/14799/ppd-spotlight-jon-ortners-nude-perfectionism.html
- Canyon Wilderness of the Southwest, Rizzoli Press,
- Buddha (Welcome Books, 2003 978-0-941807-28-9)
- Book Review in Spirituality & Practice: http://www.spiritualityandpractice.com/arts/reviews/view/24530/buddha
- Angkor, Celestial Temples of Khmer Empire (Abbeville Press, 2002 978-0-789207-18-0)
- Japan Times Book Review : https://www.japantimes.co.jp/culture/2003/11/30/books/book-reviews/power-and-glory-of-temple-ruins/#.WzqCXRlJlp8
- Where Every Breath Is A Prayer, A Photographic Pilgrimage into the Spiritual Heart of Asia (Stewart, Tabori & Chang, 1996 978-1-556704-39-0)
- Book Review from Publishers Weekly: https://www.publishersweekly.com/978-1-55670-439-0
- Manhattan Dawn and Dusk (Stewart, Tabori, & Chang 1995 978-1-556704-26-0)

== Awards ==
Communication Arts, Design Award

- AIGA Design Award; Hawaii Visitors Bureau, Award for Best Photography
- Print Magazine, Regional Design Award
- Marsden Grant, Himalayan Research

== Media coverage ==
- National Geographic News, Photographer Showcases Legendary Khmer Temple Preah Vihear
- Architectural Digest, Adrift in a Mughal Garden, May 1990 p. 90–95
- Architectural Digest, New York Special Issue, November 1992, Cover and Special Edition Poster
- GEO Magazine, Where Every Breath Is A Prayer, March 1982, V4, p. 74–85
- GEO Magazine, What happened to Shangri La, June 1983, V5, p. 24–31
- Natural History Magazine, Sacred and Profane Himalaya, January 1988, p. 26–35
- Print Magazine, Peaks, May/June 1985, p. 78–85
- Travel Holiday Magazine, Sea Spell, September 1991, p. 58–64
