= Jon Myer =

American inventor

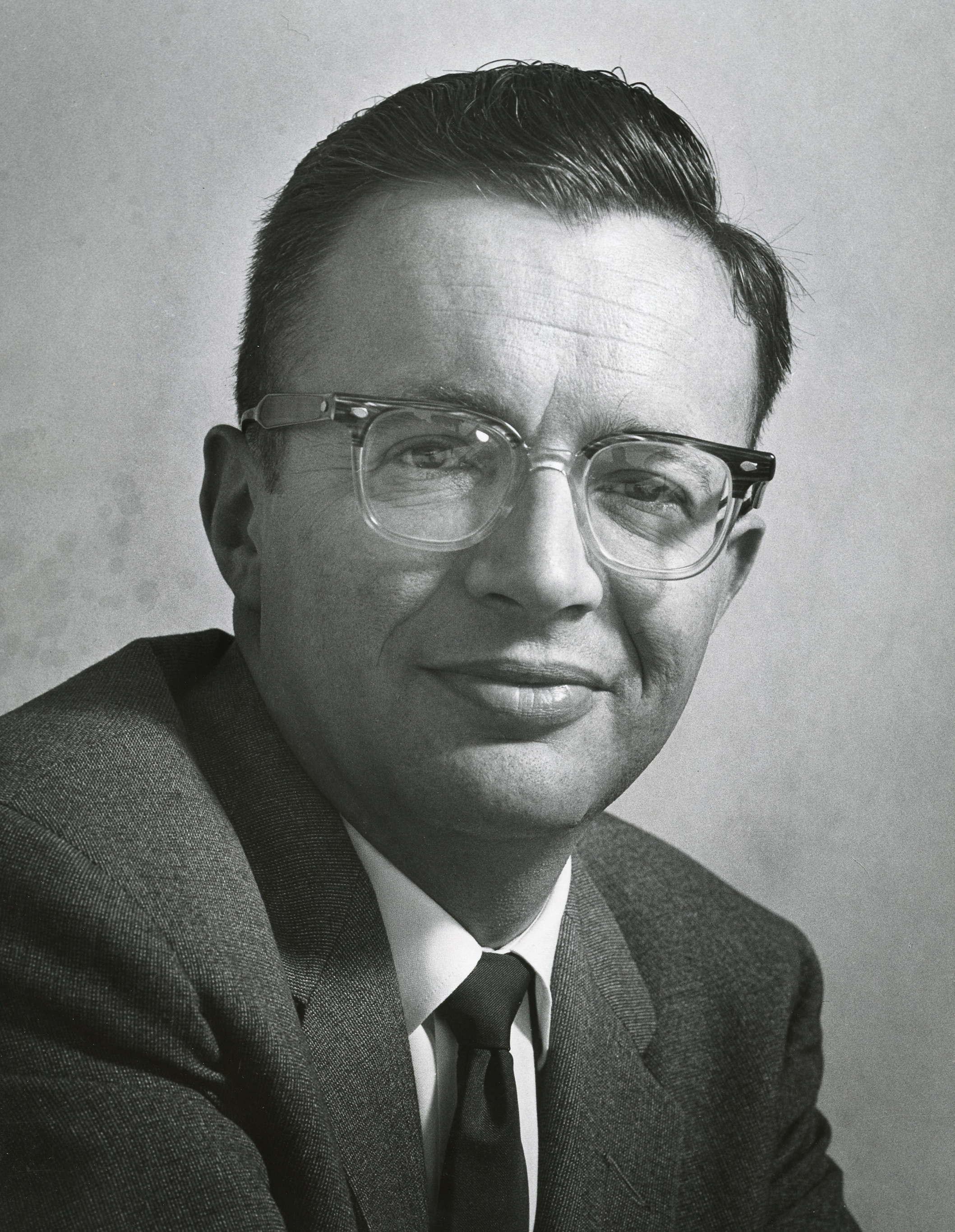
- Born: Hans Wolfgang Mayer; September 29, 1922; Heilbronn, Germany
- Died: August 30, 2001 (aged 78); Woodland Hills, California, U.S.
- Education: Hebrew Technical College
- Notable work: Supermarket Scanner
- Spouse: Gerda Myer (1947-2001)
- Children: 4

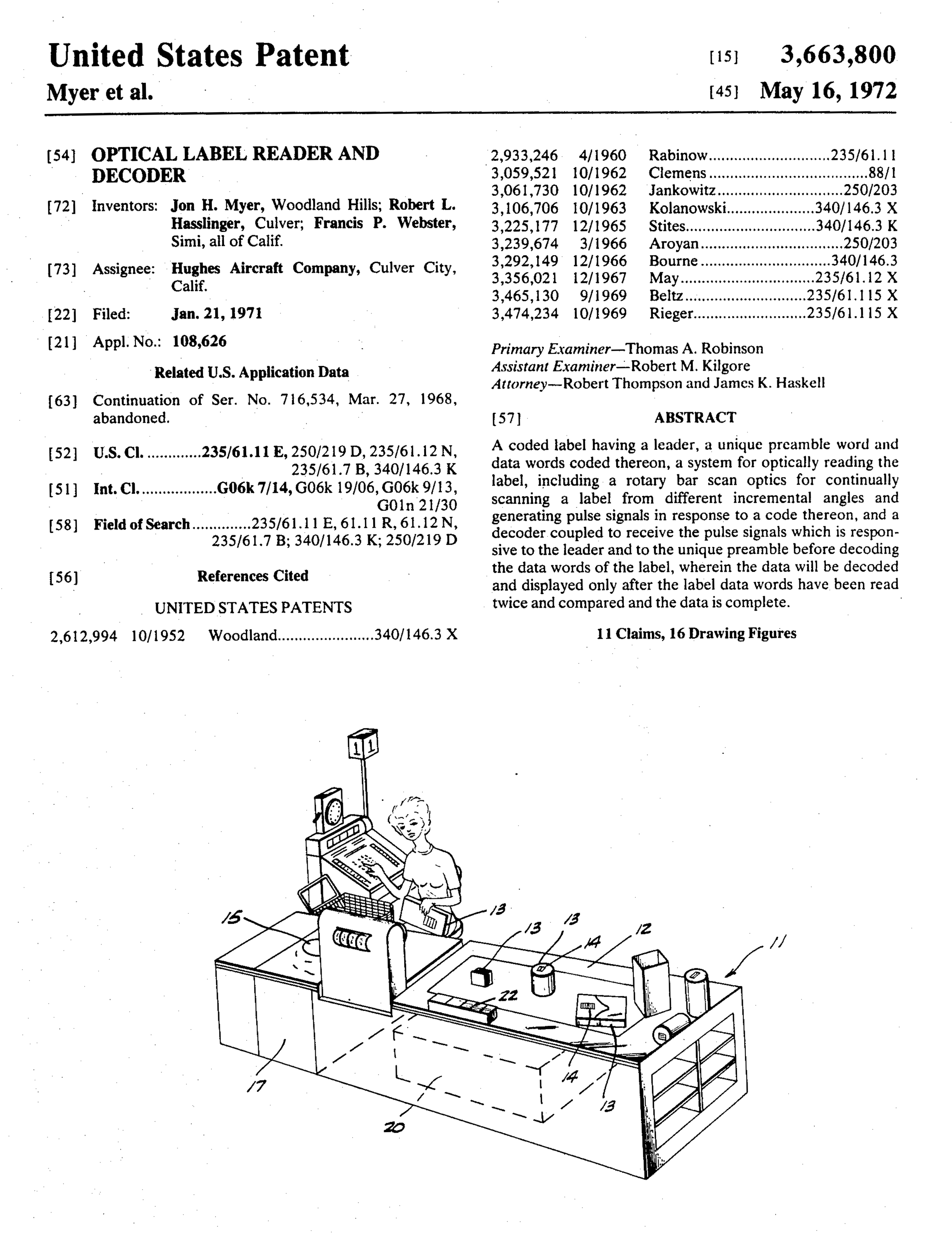
First page of US Patent number 3,663,800 - Optical Label Reader and Decoder

Jon Myer (September 29, 1922 – August 30, 2001) was an experimental physicist and inventor who received 50 U.S. patents in the fields of semiconductors, mechanics, electronics, magnetics and optics. His prolific work encompassed a wide field of research and his inventions ranged from supermarket scanners to laser microwelder technology. Over the course of his career, Myer was the author of 11 scholarly papers on semiconductor materials technology, optical instrumentation, information processing and the history of science. In 1972 he was inducted into the Tau Beta Pi engineering honor society.

== Early life ==
Myer was born Hans Wolfgang Mayer in Heilbronn, Germany. In 1935, at the age of 13, he fled the Nazis to British-governed Palestine with his parents and two younger brothers.

Myer earned his engineering degree in 1941 from the Hebrew Technical College in Haifa and worked at the Technion - Israel Institute of Technology on a variety of projects including anti-magnetic-mine timers for the British Navy. While at the Technion, he worked with George Feher on secret project for the paramilitary Haganah, to devise a system for broad communication of secret information without the use of wired or wireless systems. This project remained a state secret for over 50 years.

== Career ==
In 1942, Myer became an instrument designer and engineer for the Anglo Iranian Oil Co. in Abadan, Iran later returning to the Hebrew Technical College as an instrument designer and engineering consultant. Myer emigrated to the United States in 1947 where he changed his name to Jon Harold Myer. He worked as an instrumentologist in the University of Southern California chemistry department for six years. From 1953 to 1967, Myer worked as an engineer and physicist in the Semiconductor Division as well as the Aerospace Systems division at Hughes Aircraft Company in Newport Beach, California. In 1967, he became a member of the Technical Staff at Hughes Research Laboratories in Malibu, California and was ultimately promoted to Senior Scientist. He also served as a consultant in the Radar Systems Division at Hughes Aircraft in Culver City. Myer was awarded the Hughes Corporate Group Patent Award upon his retirement in 1991.

In addition to his work at Hughes, Myer lectured extensively to professional and lay audiences including school-age children on the subjects of creativity as well as science and technology in society. He also taught science and technology in law enforcement at California Lutheran College.

He received the distinguished service Silver Beaver Award from the Boy Scouts of America in 1966 for creating the first Boy Scouts Explorer post in Newport Beach, California dedicated to science and technology as well as the first to include women.

== Published journal articles ==
- Myer, Jon H. (1952). "A new type of transparent projection slide". Journal of Chemical Education. 29 (1): 28. Bibcode:1952JChEd..29...28M. doi:10.1021/ed029p28.
- Myer, Jon H. (1953). "A Low Noise, Corrosion-Proof, Battery Connection". Review of Scientific Instruments. 24 (1): 82. Bibcode:1953RScI...24...82M. doi:10.1063/1.1770534.
- Myer, Jon H. (1962). "A Survey of Semiconductor Materials Technology". IRE Transactions on Component Parts. 8 (2): 65–69. doi:10.1109/TCP.1961.1136595.
- Myer, Jon H.; Cook, Frank J. (1969). "Optigami—A Tool for Optical Systems Design". Applied Optics. 8 (2): 260. doi:10.1364/AO.8.000260. PMID 20072210.
- Myer, Jon H. (1969). "VEPOL-A vehicular planimetric dead-reckoning computer". IEEE Transactions on Vehicular Technology. 20 (3): 62–68. doi:10.1109/T-VT.1971.23480.
- Myer, Jon H. (1971). "Electron-Beam Plasma-Doping Process". Journal of Applied Physics. 42 (7): 2851–2853. Bibcode:1971JAP....42.2851M. doi:10.1063/1.1660638.
- Myer, Jon H. (1971). "Zoomable kaleidoscopic mirror tunnel". Applied Optics. 10 (9): 2179–2182. Bibcode:1971ApOpt..10.2179M. doi:10.1364/AO.10.002179. PMID 20111290.
- Myer, Jon H. (1972). "Two Zero-g Showers". Astronautics & Aeronautics. 10 (6): 68–69.
- Myer, Jon H. (1972). "MICOR - A New Orientation and Position Insensitive Data Code Reader". Optical Engineering. 11 (4): 110497. Bibcode:1972OptEn..11..497M. doi:10.1117/12.7975908.
- Myer, Jon H. (1972). "The Forgotten Sprengel–Babo Pump: A Continuously Recycling Positive-Displacement Mercury-Drop Gas Pump". Journal of Vacuum Science & Technology. 9 (3): 1106–1111. Bibcode:1972JVST....9.1106M. doi:10.1116/1.1316999.
- Rosenbaum, Arthur L.; Myer, Jon H. (1980). "New Instrument for the Quantitative Determination of Passive Forced Traction". Ophthalmology. 87 (2): 158–163. doi:10.1016/S0161-6420(80)35265-2. PMID 7383545.
