= Jon Dumbrill =

South African cricketer (born 1935)

Personal information
- Born: 9 April 1935 (age 91); Colliers Wood, England
- Source: Cricinfo, 17 December 2020

Jon Dumbrill (born 9 April 1935) is a South African cricketer. He played in twenty first-class matches from 1956/57 to 1965/66.
