= Jon Elissalde =

French professional rugby union player

- Born: Jon Elissalde; 2 December 1992 (age 33)
- Height: 1.75 m (5 ft 9 in)
- Weight: 83 kg (13 st 1 lb)

Rugby union career
- Position: Full back
Senior career
| Years | Team | Apps | (Points) |
| 2013- | Bayonne | 12 | (0) |
- Correct as of 17 January 2015

Jon Elissalde is a French professional rugby union player. He plays at full back for Bayonne in the Top 14.
