= Jon Kedrowski =

American mountain climber

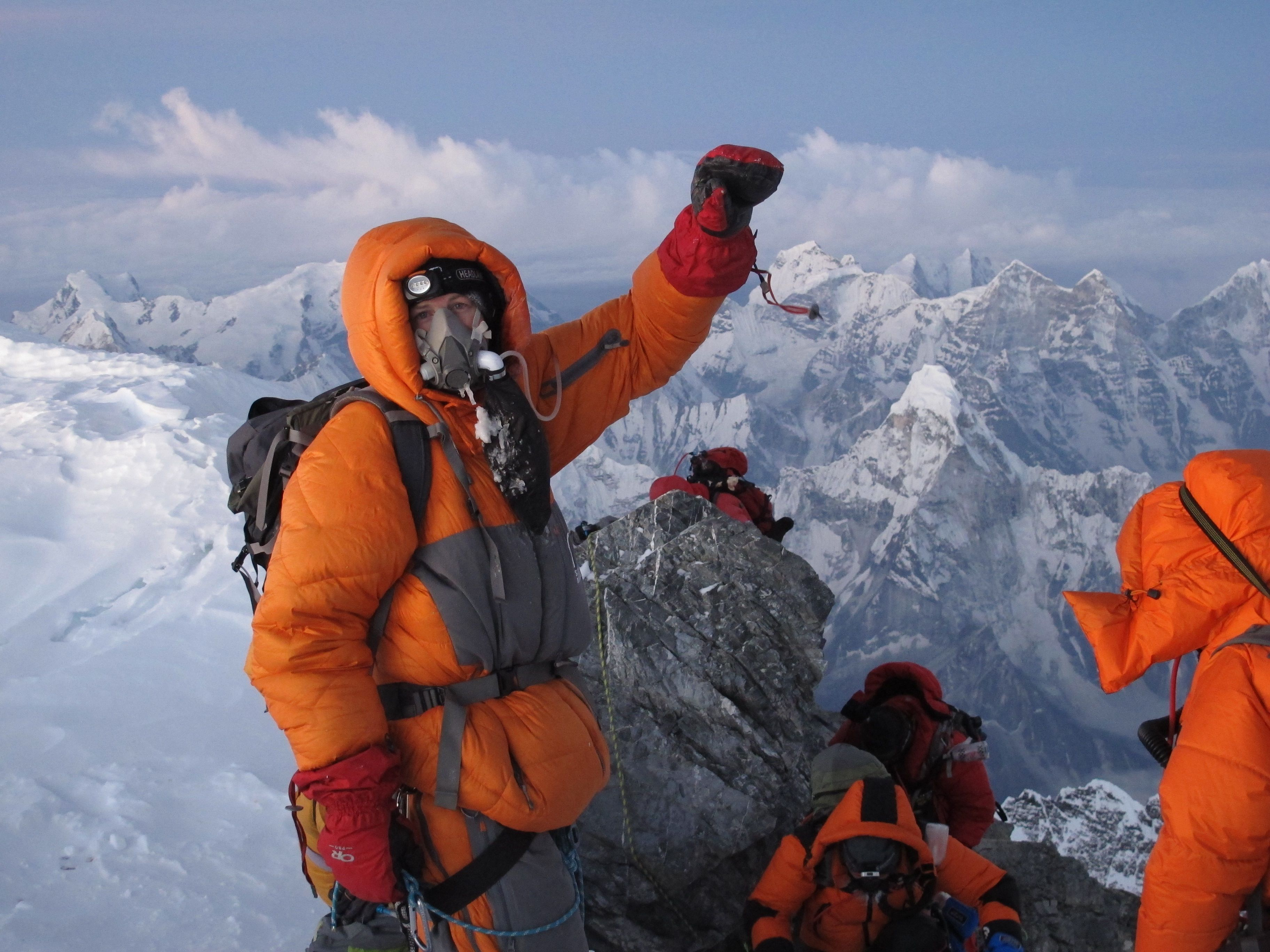
Jon Kedrowski on Everest, May 2012

Jonathan James Kedrowski (born May 12, 1979) is an author, ski-mountaineer, and geographer from Colorado. He is best known for summiting and camping overnight on the summit of all of Colorado's Fourteeners (mountains over 14,000 feet) in 2011.

== Early life and education ==
Kedrowski is the son of Robert Allan Kedrowski and Barbara Jean Kedrowski. He was born and raised in Vail, Colorado. He earned a bachelor's degree from Valparaiso University in 2002, and a Masters of Arts in Environmental Geography from the University of South Florida in 2006. In 2010, he earned a PhD in Environmental Geography from Texas State University, and he has worked as an assistant professor in the Department of Geography at Central Washington University.

== Mountaineering ==
Between 1996 and 1999, Kedrowski summited all 55 of Colorado's Fourteeners. In 2011, Kedrowski summited, camped, and spent the night on top of all 55 peaks over the course of 95 days. According to The Denver Post, Kedrowski was the first person to accomplish this feat. In 2012, he published a book about the experience, Sleeping on the Summits, Colorado Fourteener High Bivys.

In 2012, Kedrowski, successfully climbed Mount Everest, reaching the summit on May 26, 2012. During an earlier summit attempt on May 19–20, Kedrowski was present during one of the deadliest days in Everest history, when violent weather and a "traffic jam" near the summit led to the deaths of four climbers. Kedrowski's summit was followed closely and featured on the DatelineNBC Documentary "Into the Death Zone" which won the 2014 Edward R Morrow Award for best Sound and Video.

In 2014, Kedrowski skied 20 Cascade Volcanoes in 30 days, camping on the summits of seven of the more notable volcanoes such as Mount Shasta, Mount Hood, Mount Adams, Mount Baker, and Mount Rainier. His adventure was chronicled in his second book Skiing and Sleeping on the Summits: Cascade Volcanoes of the Pacific Northwest which was released in April 2016.

Kedrowski was at the Mt. Everest Basecamp when the April 2015 Nepal earthquake struck, causing avalanches on the mountain, injuring nearly 100. Kedrowski was unhurt by the event, helped with recovery efforts, and collected data about the earthquake for the USGS.

== Published works ==
- "Mapping a Section of the Continental Divide Trail (CDT) in Colorado’s Southern San Juan Wilderness". (2009). International Journal of Wilderness 15(3): (17–22).
- "Determining Relative Annual Climbing Frequency of Colorado’s 14,000-foot Peaks". (2009) Mountain Research and Development, 29(1): (82–92).
- "Dirty Snow: Documenting the 2009 dust storm events in Colorado’s San Juan and Elk Mountains with repeat photography and historical snowpack data." (2011). NWA Online Electronic Journal of Operational Meteorology. Nov 2010 EJ7. (1-39)
- Sleeping on the Summits: Colorado Fourteener High Bivys by Jon Kedrowski and Chris Tomer (2012)
- Skiing and Sleeping on the Summits: Cascade Volcanoes of the Pacific Northwest Skiing 20 Peaks in 30 Days by Jon Kedrowski (2016)
