= Jon Freeman =

Jon Freeman may refer to:

- Jon Freeman (game designer), American game designer
- Jon Freeman (academic), American psychologist
