= Jon Haber =

American activist

Jon Haber is an American writer and political activist. The Jewish Week calls Haber "a key resource for anti-BDS activists."

== Activism ==
Haber's Zionist activism dates to November 3, 1994, when during an MIT forum on the subject of Jewish fundamentalism hosting Noam Chomsky and Israel Shahak, he circulated an unsigned pamphlet denouncing the two speakers, later rising during the presentation to announce his authorship of the text when challenged. Haber later took to USENET to reprint the writing and to defend his actions.

In 2004, he renewed his commitments when anti-Israel activists proposed that the Board of Aldermen in his hometown of Somerville, Massachusetts should boycott Israel.

Haber has written internationally on the subject of divest-from-Israel campaigns and their impact on civil institutions such as municipalities, religious institutions and schools. Haber is the creator of the Web site Somerville Middle East Justice, which chronicled the three-year battle against municipal divestment in Somerville, Massachusetts He also worked with Presbyterian anti-divestment activist Will Spotts on the Web site Bearing Witness (now defunct) which contributed to the successful 2006 campaign to see the Presbyterian Church PCUSA overturn its 2004 decision to begin a "phased, selective" program in corporations that do business in Israel. He is also the creator of the Web site DivestThis!, which chronicles the ongoing failures of the BDS movement, and an online guide of the same name.

A recurring theme in the author's work is what he refers to as the "corrupting impact" of divestment programs on the organizations that embrace them. He dubs this phenomenon "The Vampire's Kiss", an allusion to the legend that vampires (which he likens to the destructive force of divestment programs on civic institutions) can only enter one's house if invited.

In addition to providing commentary on divestment campaigns to various publications, Haber has been a movie reviewer for The Boston Globe and Boston NPR station WBUR, as well as writing on the intersection of politics, economics and popular culture for the online publication TCS Daily.
