= Jon Breakingbury =

Wales international rugby league footballer

Personal information
- Full name: Jon Breakingbury
- Born: 5 October 1982 (age 42); Wales

Playing information
- Height: 6 ft 0 in (1.83 m)
- Weight: 17 st 0 lb (108 kg)

Rugby league
- Position: Centre
Club
Years	Team	Pld	T	G	FG	P
	Cardiff Demons
2004	Sheffield Eagles
2005	Valley Cougars
2006	Celtic Crusaders
2010	Winlaton Warriors
2011–12	Gateshead Spartans
	Total	0	0	0	0	0
Representative
Years	Team	Pld	T	G	FG	P
2005	Wales	1	0	0	0	0

Rugby union
Club
Years	Team	Pld	T	G	FG	P
2008	Gateshead RFC

Jon Breakingbury (born 5 October 1982) is a professional rugby league and rugby union footballer. He played representative level rugby league (RL) for Wales, and at club level for Cardiff Demons, Sheffield Eagles, Valley Cougars and Celtic Crusaders, Winlaton Warriors and Gateshead Spartans, as a centre, and club level rugby union (RU) for Gateshead RFC.

== International honours ==
Jon Breakingbury won a cap for Wales (RL) while at Valley Cougars in 2005 (interchange/substitute).

== Note ==
Breakingbury's forename is variously spelt as Jon, or John.
