= Jon Bingesser =

American football coach and school administrator (born 1939)

Biographical details
- Born: 1939 (age 86–87)

Playing career
- ?: Washburn

Coaching career (HC unless noted)
- 1981–1984: Kansas Wesleyan

Head coaching record
- Overall: 13–26–1

Accomplishments and honors

Championships
- 1 KCAC (1982)

Jon C. Bingesser is an American former football coach and school administrator.

== Coaching career ==
=== High school ===
Bingesser spent many years coaching in Kansas at the high school level. He was widely recognized by his peers for his coaching abilities in 2007 when he was inducted into the Kansas Shrine Bowl Hall of Fame after having coached the game in 1975 and then again in 1981.

=== Kansas Wesleyan ===
Bingesser was the 16th head football coach at Kansas Wesleyan University in Salina, Kansas and he held that position for four seasons, from 1981 until 1984. His coaching record at Kansas Wesleyan was 13–26–1.

== Academic career ==
After coaching in college, Bingesser entered public school education in Kansas. In 1994, he was named "Assistant Principal of the Year" by the Kansas Association of Secondary School Principals.

== Head coaching record ==
Year	Team	Overall	Conference	Standing	Bowl/playoffs
Kansas Wesleyan Coyotes (Kansas Collegiate Athletic Conference) (1981–1984)
1981	Kansas Wesleyan	2–7–1	2–5–1	7th	
1982	Kansas Wesleyan	8–2	8–1	1st	
1983	Kansas Wesleyan	3–7	3–6	T–6th	
1984	Kansas Wesleyan	0–10	0–9	10th	
Kansas Wesleyan:		13–26–1	13–21–1		
Total:		13–26–1			
National championship Conference title Conference division title or championship game berth
