= Jon Huntsman =

Jon Huntsman may refer to:

- Jon Huntsman Sr. (1937–2018), corporate executive and philanthropist (father of Jon Huntsman Jr.)
- Jon Huntsman Jr. (born 1960), U.S. politician and the former U.S. ambassador to Russia, China and Singapore
- John A. Huntsman (1867–1902), American Medal of Honor recipient for actions during the Philippine–American War
