= Jon Magnussen =

Norwegian economist

- Born: 12 August 1959 (age 67); Sunndal Municipality, Norway
- Scientific career
- Workplaces: NTNU

Jon Magnussen (born 12 August 1959) is a Norwegian Professor in health economics and Head of Department of Public Health and General Practice at Norwegian University of Science and Technology (NTNU) in Trondheim. Organization and financing of health care services and productivity and efficiency in the health care sector is some of his research topics.

== Honors ==
- Third Adam Smith award in mental health economics and policy research, 2007, for paper:

Kittelsen S A C, Halsteinli V, Magnussen J: Productivity growth in Norwegian psychiatric outpatient clinics for children and youths. A panel data analysis of the period 1996–2001. J. Mental Health Policy Econ, 2005 8:183-91

== Publications ==
- List of publications by Jon Magnussen in BIBSYS (Norway)
