= Jon Snodgrass (sociologist) =

Panamanian author

Jon Snodgrass (July 27, 1941 – November 5, 2015) was a Panamanian author, born in Colón, Panama, to John Alphonso and Olivia Jane (Chestnut) Snodgrass. He received his Ph.D. sociology in 1972 at the University of Pennsylvania. He worked in the department of sociology at California State University in Los Angeles.

Snodgrass died in 2015 at his home in South Pasadena.

== Works ==
- (Editor) for Men Against Sexism: A Book of Readings, Times Change Press, 1977.
- The Jack-Roller at Seventy: A Fifty-Year Follow-Up, Lexington Books, 1982.
- "Patriarchy and Phantasy: A Conception of Psychoanalytic Sociology" (The American Journal of Psychoanalysis, 43 (Fall 1983) 261-275)
- Career Strategies Map and Guide, Career Strategies Center (South Pasadena, California), 1990.
- Follow Your Career Star: A Career Quest Based on Inner Values, Kensington Books (New York) 1996.
- Peace Knights of the Soul: Wisdom in 'Star Wars', Inner Circle Publishing, 2006.
