= The Toucher and Rich Show =

Radio show in Boston, Massachusetts

Toucher and Rich
- Genre: Sports talk (2009 – 2023); Comedy, Talk, Rock (2006 – 2009)
- Running time: ~4 hours
- Country of origin: United States
- Home station: 98.5 WBZ-FM (August 13, 2009 – December 19, 2023); 104.1 WBCN (June 5, 2006 – August 12, 2009)
- Starring: Fred Toettcher; Rich Shertenlieb; Jon Wallach
- Original release: June 5, 2006 – December 19, 2023
- Opening theme: "Honey Bucket" by Melvins

Toucher and Rich was a radio show hosted by Fred Toettcher and Rich Shertenlieb, airing from 6 to 10 AM on WBZ-FM, in Boston, Massachusetts. Following an audition, Toettcher and Shertenlieb debuted on alternative rock station WBCN on June 5, 2006. Beginning August 13, 2009, the show transitioned to sports talk station WBZ-FM.

From August 17, 2015, until July 13, 2018, the show was simulcast on NBC Sports Boston. The show was later streamed live on Twitch and YouTube.

On September 24, 2016, Toucher & Rich received the Marconi Award, the highest award in radio for Major Market Personality of the Year.

Until mid-2007 the show's opening theme was "Fuck All Y'all" by Saliva. Thereafter, the opening theme was "Honey Bucket" by Melvins.

Toucher and Rich entered regional syndication on October 25, 2021. The program's inaugural affiliates consisted of four Townsquare Media stations: the trimulcast of WCYY in Portland, Maine, WPKQ in North Conway, New Hampshire, and WJZN in Augusta, Maine; and WEZQ in Bangor, Maine. In October 2023, the show reverted to broadcasting exclusively on WBZ-FM and Twitch.

Following longstanding tensions between Shertenlieb and Toettcher, as well as Beasley Broadcast Group corporate management, Shertenlieb exited the show on November 10, 2023. On December 19, Beasley Broadcast Group announced that Rob "Hardy" Poole would join Toettcher for the Toucher & Hardy morning show, debuting January 4, 2024.

== History ==
Toettcher and Shertenlieb met at WNNX in Atlanta, Georgia, in 1999. Shertenlieb worked on the station's morning show alongside Leslie Fram, Steve Barnes, Jimmy Baron, and Crash Clark. Toettcher, meanwhile, started at the station as a receptionist before hosting evenings. Shertenlieb later exited WNNX, joining the Kidd Kraddick Morning Show at KHKS in Dallas-Fort Worth as a producer. In 2003, Toettcher replaced Barnes in mornings at WNNX, joining Fram, Baron, and Clark for "The Don Miller Morning Show," later renamed "Toucher, Jimmy, and Leslie."

In December 2005, Shertenlieb exited KHKS, expressing a desire to start his own show. In March 2006, following Cumulus Media's acquisition of Susquehanna Radio Corporation, Toettcher requested to be released from his contract at WNNX with intentions to join Shertenlieb's venture. Together they auditioned at KZON Free FM in Phoenix, Arizona, hosting a week of overnight shows. They also auditioned at WBCN in Boston, where they were eventually hired in April of that year. While plans initially called for them to serve as local replacements for the recently canceled David Lee Roth show, Toettcher and Shertenlieb were instead assigned to afternoon drive, as the New York–based duo of Opie & Anthony would instead helm mornings.

Upon signing with WBCN, the duo recruited Crash Clark, who had been released from WNNX following an incident at a station event where two listeners engaged in a public sexual act at Clark's encouragement. Also brought on was Adolfo Gonzalez, a 20-year-old fan of Kraddick's whom Shertenlieb befriended at KHKS, whose personal life and quirky personality fascinated Shertenlieb. The group formally debuted on WBCN on June 5, 2006.

Following the launch of WBZ-FM on August 13, 2009, the show transferred from WBCN following the latter's format change. At this point, the show was airing in morning drive, having transitioned from afternoons in December 2008. The move from WBCN to WBZ-FM was widely questioned within the broadcast industry; many insiders wondered if Toettcher and Shertenlieb, otherwise inexperienced in sports talk radio, were transplanted from an alternative rock station merely to finish out their contracts, which had approximately one year left following their move.

While increasing their focus on local and national sports and adjusting their target demographic from males 18-34 to males 25-54, the show's content was largely unchanged from its run on WBCN. Several segments from the WBCN-era, such as "Drunken Recaps," were transferred over, while new bits were created with involvement from local athletes and sportscasters. For the show's launch on WBZ-FM, Jon Wallach was added to the cast as a contributor and to provide "Sports Hub headlines" every twenty (later thirty) minutes; Wallach previously served a similar role on the midday program at competitor WEEI-FM. Also around this time, Gonzalez was moved to a largely off-air role, though he was still featured for regular on-air segments and was utilized for "man on the street" bits.

On April 2, 2010, Crash Clark exited the show after his contract was not renewed by station management. He has since made numerous guest appearances, either via telephone or during on-location events. On May 23, 2016, Adolfo Gonzalez announced his exit from the program, expressing a desire to return home to Dallas, Texas, and attend college. With Gonzalez's exit, former intern Nick Gemelli was recruited to work alongside producers Dan O'Brien and Mike Lockhart, screening listener phone calls, collecting street audio, and later operating the show's Twitch/YouTube feed.

== Departure of Shertenlieb ==
On October 25, 2023, Beasley Broadcast Group announced that Toettcher signed a new contract "to continue to serve at the helm of 98.5 The Sports Hub in Boston’s Award-winning morning show for years to come." On November 10, Shertenlieb's departure from the show was announced after he refused to sign a multi-year contract extension "on terms better than his existing contract."

Toettcher discussed Shertenlieb's departure during the opening segment of the November 10 broadcast. Toettcher said that he learned of the change from the station's management while he was driving home after the previous day's show. He also discussed problems that had developed between him and Shertenlieb, and then described a prolonged period of estrangement between the two. He also said that Shertenlieb didn't tell him of his planned departure, which came as a surprise.

Despite this, Toettcher revealed that he and Shertenlieb had exchanged cordial, parting text messages. Out of respect for Shertenlieb, Toettcher announced that the show would retire his production elements and segments, such as "What Happened Last Night" and "Fart Court." While he also stated the name of the show would remain until January 2024, there was no direct reference to "The Toucher and Rich Show" by on-air hosts or in production pieces, only referring to it as "the morning show."

On May 20, 2024, Shertenlieb began hosting an eponymous morning show on iHeartMedia's WZLX in Boston, replacing longtime hosts Pete McKenzie, Heather Ford, and the late Kevin Karlson. Due to low ratings and conflicts with station management over the direction of the program, Shertenlieb's show was canceled after less than six months. Following his program's debut and subsequent cancellation, comments made on-air by Toettcher suggest his and Shertenlieb's relationship completely deteriorated.

== Aftermath ==
On January 4, 2024, the Toucher & Hardy show debuted on The Sports Hub in the same morning drive time slot, hosted by Toettcher and Rob "Hardy" Poole. Poole is best known for his tenure on the station's midday show, having previously worked with Toettcher on WBCN. With Poole's addition, the program's content remains largely unchanged from its previous incarnation, and continues to feature Jon Wallach as co-host. Ratings also remain very strong, with the program regularly garnering over 20% of the total listening share in its target demographic.

On September 7, 2024, longtime show producers Dan O'Brien and Mike Lockhart exited the station. Former WBOS program director and personality "Adam 12" Chapman assumed executive producer duties from O'Brien, thus reuniting on the show the respective morning, midday, and afternoon drive hosts of the later-era WBCN.

Throughout the summer of 2024, the WBCN-era bit "Ask Crash" was resurrected by Toettcher, with former co-host Crash Clark calling in from Atlanta and responding to listener emails. Adolfo Gonzalez has also made several on-air appearances on the show since its launch, contributing street audio and other content.

== Show Members ==
- Fred "Toucher" Toettcher – Host.
- Rob "Hardy" Poole – Host. Also voice-tracked morning drive on the Sirius XM channel Lithium, with previous stops at WBCN, WBOS, and KXTE in Las Vegas. Hosts the Sports Hub Golf Club on Sunday mornings during golf season.
- Jon Wallach – Co-Host, Sports Hub Headlines. Wallach joined the show in 2009 following the transition to WBZ-FM. Prior to joining Toucher and Rich, Wallach worked at rival WEEI, providing headlines for Dale Arnold and Michael Holley. The latter once remarked to Fred that he and Rich "gave Wallach a personality" since joining their show.
- Nick Gemelli – Producer – Nick interned for the show during WBCN, but abruptly left show in 2008. He returned in 2016, following Adolfo Gonzalez's departure. In May 2018, Nick fell ill and was diagnosed with methicillin-susceptible Staphylococcus aureus. He underwent open heart surgery to replace a damaged heart valve with artificial one. Fred frequently refers to Nick as "Young Sickly Nick," often mentioning that Nick was found "lying in his own feces" by his now-wife. Nick currently runs the show's live video feed, screens listener phone calls, and contributes to the Sports Hub website. He's also responsible for street audio segments, including Drunken Recaps, ‘Ask A Pink Hat’ and more. He's the son of popular show personality, Mark Gemelli.
- Ryan Beaton – Associate Producer. Joined the show in 2024 following former producer Mike Lockhart's departure.

== Former Show Members ==
- Rich Shertenlieb – Host, production. After a purported falling out with Toettcher and Beasley Broadcast Group as a whole, Shertenlieb did not renew a multi-year contract extension and exited the show in November 2023.
- Adolfo Gonzalez, Jr. – Former phone screener and street reporter who conducted interviews for the Drunken Red Sox, Bruins, Celtics, and Patriots recaps. Rich befriended Adolfo while working on the Kidd Kraddick morning show at KHKS, as Adolfo would frequently watch the show through the studio's street-facing windows. Adolfo is often remarked on for his weight, speech patterns, and depressingly neglectful childhood (bordering on criminally abusive child neglect). He is also noted for having knowledge of random facts associated with American History, in particular facts and dates related to World War II. Adolfo's last day was May 31, 2016, in order to return to college full-time in Texas.
- Christopher "Crash" Clark – Co-host during the show's WBCN era, and its first year on WBZ-FM. Crash is close friends with Fred, having previously worked with him and Rich at 99X in Atlanta. During the WBCN years, Crash covered local traffic, news, sports and more. Having anticipated a larger on-air role on WBZ-FM prior to Jon Wallach's addition, Crash opted not to renew his contract in 2010, and returned to Atlanta. He worked at WXIA-TV as a traffic reporter, from 2014 until 2024 when his position was eliminated. He has since rejoined 99X, co-hosting the resurrected "Morning X" alongside Steve Barnes and Leslie Fram.
- Dan O'Brien – Executive Producer. Formerly the music director and night host on WBCN, Dan co-hosted the Tool Bags home improvement podcast with Tony Massarotti for WBZ-FM. Dan was let go in September 2024 due to corporate budget cuts.
- Brian "B-Real" Flora – Producer during the show's WBCN era, who later worked on-air part-time at rival WAAF. B-Real regularly contributes feedback and content to the show to this day, and is mentioned on-air frequently by Fred and Rich.
- Mike Lockhart – Production Director/Producer. Former co-host of the 98.5 The Sports Hub Fantasy Football Show on Sunday mornings during the NFL Season. In October 2022, Lockhart was let go from Beasley Broadcast Group as part of company-wide downsizing; however, on October 17, it was announced on air that he would return the show, with Rich paying his salary in-full. Lockhart ultimately exited the station in 2024, following O'Brien's departure.
- Jonathan "Bird" Marchant – Former call screener from Everett, MA who infamously hooked up his own A/V system in the station's production studio to watch movies during the show. Known for handling security at Fenway Park, "Bird" has an unrivaled inability to form coherent sentences while speaking. Though he exited the show in 2020 due to COVID-19-related budget cuts, Bird continues to appear in occasional pre-recorded segments, typically reviewing films with Nick Gemelli.
- PJ – Former intern and later producer during the WBCN era. PJ exited the show in 2008.
- "Adam 12" Chapman – Executive Producer – Adam 12 previously hosted middays on WBCN, with his program airing in-between Fred and Rich's morning show and Hardy's afternoon program by the end of the station's run. A Massachusetts native, Adam 12 has held radio jobs in Albuquerque, at WFNX in Boston, and most recently at WBOS as the music director and midday host. With WBOS' format flipping to Bloomberg Radio, and with that station and WBZ-FM both under Beasley Broadcast Group ownership, Adam immediately segued into the Executive Producer role on the show following Dan O'Brien's exit in late 2024. Adam has a vast knowledge of alternative and indie rock music, contributing to the show music beds by obscure artists not usually heard on commercial radio. He can also play the trombone. Following Bob Bronson's retirement in May 2026, Adam segued to sister station WROR to host morning drive.

== 104.1 WBCN ==
=== Contributors ===
- The Chili Guy: A frequent bit on the show involved interviewing a schizophrenic homeless man known as "The Chili Guy". His rants and catch-phrases are a favorite on the show, including "Couple beers, no beers...chili", "Bring Him Up On Racketeering Charges!", "Who's Buyin'? Who's Sellin'? Who's Buyin'? Who's Sellin'?" and "How many eights you got?". His favorite food is from "Pizza House", and his favorite beverage is "Red Drink". He claims to be related to Ted DiBiase and Hulk Hogan. The Chili Guy was most often interviewed by Adolfo Gonzalez, though other members of the show and Fred's wife interviewed him at various times as well. The Chili Guy is believed to have died.
- Dungeon Master Jim: a Boston lawyer whose main hobby is gaming. DMJ is the T&R definitive source for all things nerdy, and had his own segments.
- The Gunner: An often inebriated caller who began every call by saying "Hey guys... hey." Pieces with The Gunner included his karaoke of various popular songs. Frequently challenged Adolfo to a "panty drinking contest", which involved chugging beers through a woman's used panties. To this day, many loyal listeners begin their calls into the showwith "hey guys, hey" in honor of The Gunner. The Gunner died on April 16, 2019.
- Mike "Behind The Mic" Callahan: A broadcaster from Dean College that sent in a demo tape in the hope that he could take Rich's job. Mike was tasked with making theme songs for all of the towns involved in the "Five Towns in Five Days" promotion that Toucher and Rich presented. MBTM continues to submit off-key song parodies.
- Rich Cronin: This former member of boy band L.F.O. became a show favorite with his candid and self-effacing tales of a Boston guy in Hollywood, getting hit on by manager Lou Perlman, and scoring and being dumped by Jennifer Love Hewitt.
- The T.A.R.D.S: The Toucher and Rich Show's fan base, standing for "Toucher And Rich Derelicts/Diehards/Disciples/Degenerates/Drunks". In the early days of the show this term could be seen on bumper stickers all over Boston. It's no longer used, presumably due to shifting social views regarding special needs and Rich's long-time involvement with the Miracle League of Massachusetts.

=== Popular segments ===
- Ask Crash: Listeners would call in or email questions to Crash Clark, addressing a wide range of topics including but not limited to sex, relationships, and drinking. Crash's responses were tongue-in-cheek and rife with innuendo. The theme song was a parody of "I’d Do Anything for Love (But I Won’t Do That)" by Meat Loaf. This segment was briefly resurrected during the summer of 2024, with Crash calling in to the show from Atlanta.
- Best of Boston: An annual contest to determine who has the best face, butt, boobs and feet in Boston. Winners get tickets to the "chili pot" St. Patrick's Day.
- Chili Guy Thursdays: Thursday installments of the show would dedicate significant time, if not the entire broadcast, to playing audio of Adolfo's latest encounters and escapades with The Chili Guy.
- Warp Speed To the Weekend: A Friday segment where Dungeon Master Jim joined Fred and Rich to discuss the weekend's upcoming events in sci-fi and fantasy.
- You Listened, Now Discuss: Inspired by Opie and Anthony's "What Did We Learn," this segment was typically reserved for the final break of the show during the WBCN run and early in the WBZ-FM era. Listeners would call in and reference things covered earlier in the show's broadcast. Comments would be followed by a clip of "Tom Sawyer" by Rush, mashed up with audio of The Harvard Square Hippie Puppeteer. "You Listened, Now Discuss" has since been replaced by "The Stack."

== 98.5 The Sports Hub ==
=== Past / Present Popular segments ===
- What Happened Last Night?: Airing around 6:20 a.m. and setting the stage for the morning's broadcast, Rich features audio clips from the previous night's games, conferences, and interviews.
- The Stack: Airs after 9:30am. This is the final segment of the broadcast, typically reserved for topics of discussion not already covered (usually non-sports oriented.)
- "I'm an Ass Man": Billy Gunn's theme "Ass Man" plays at the conclusion of the show, usually as a signal for Fred and Rich to sign-off in preparation of the upcoming Zolak and Bertrand radio/television simulcast.
- Fart Court: Fred, Rich, and Wallach take famous celebrities to court for passing gas. Notable celebrities found guilty include Nancy Grace, Wendy Williams, and the stations own Scott Zolak, who to this day, does not admit guilt.
- The Hot Take Police: Fred and Rich find and call out people in the media who have incredibly hot and outrageous takes on popular sports events/controversies (DeflateGate, etc.)
- Drunken Celtics/Bruins/Red Sox recap: a member of the show goes out and interviews drunks outside of stadiums and bars after Celtics, Bruins and Red Sox games. The first meeting with the Chili Guy came during a drunken Red Sox recap.
- Dating on Demand: The show analyzes cable company dating videos submitted by less than desirable folks while offering humorous commentary.
- Ask a Pink Hat: The show finds a less-than-knowledgeable and/or drunk female fan wearing a pink Red Sox cap and asks her basic questions about the Red Sox or other local sports team.
- Naughty Massarotti: Tony Massarotti reads Tweets and callers must decide whether they are real or he is making them up. Also used for describing "R-rated sex scenes" from select movies.
- New Jack Edwards: NESN Boston Bruins commentator Jack Edwards reads aloud lyrics from new jack swing songs, and listeners guess the associated artist.
- Dave Goucher Goes to the Movies: Dave Goucher (now with the Las Vegas Golden Knights) watches films such as The Karate Kid and Top Gun, and provides enthusiastic play-by-play.
- What's In Your Stack: Adolfo goes to a local Comic Book Store or Convention on a Wednesday to talk to customers about what comics they are buying and to ask several basic questions. The show attempts to guess their answers.
- The T&R Draft: The show draft teams of people, TV shows, movies, etc. that fit into certain categories, such as "Hottest TV Moms," "Celebrities that need their own reality TV show," "Best Movie fight scene," and more. Draft order is determined by the flip of a "3-headed coin," usually resulting in Jon going last. The winner is determined by a poll of audience votes.
- The Jon Gruden "This Guy" Challenge: Played on Tuesdays during the NFL season, Rich compiles the funniest and most ridiculous clips from ESPN NFL analyst Jon Gruden during his commentary of the previous night's Monday Night Football game, and a caller must decide whether or not Gruden will refer to players and/or coaches as "This Guy" during each clip.
- 98 Mile: Various on-air and off-air personalities at 98.5 The Sports Hub compete one on one in a ranked bracketed "rap battle" style tournament to determine who can rap and roast their assigned opponents in the most humorous and cleverest manner. The eventual winner of the contest was Damon Amendolara in year one and Jon Wallach in year two. 98 Mile then went on a 3-year hiatus, returning in 2015 when Rich Keefe won the competition. Dan Roche won in year four. The final round of year 4's competition was performed live at T&R's 10th Anniversary show, with Roche taking on Scott Zolak. Of note there were numerous references to Felger and Massarotti's producer James Stewart having an emotionless personality and fitting the stereotypical profile of a serial murderer. The name of the contest is a reference to the film 8-Mile.
- Know Your Armpits of America: Rich gives a short description of a real news story, while Fred and Jon Wallach guess the town where the story occurred.
- Best of/Worst of Brackets: In this bit, the cast creates March Madness-style brackets in order to pit pop culture figures against one another, usually in a field of 16. Examples include "Worst Sportscaster" (won by Glenn "The Big O" Ordway), "Most Fascinating Person in Boston" (won by The Harvard Square Puppeteer), "Douchiest Douchebag" (won by Spencer Pratt) featuring pick up artist extraordinaire Mystery, Brandon from Incubus, Guy Fieri, and others. "Best Internet Video" (won by The Alabama Leprechaun).
- Faster Guy: An heir-apparent to the Chilli Guy, Mark aka "Faster Guy" is a well-meaning, mid-western-accented, pop-music loving hang-about that frequently runs into Adolfo outside the TD Garden and Fenway Park as the latter collects drunken recaps. The Faster Guy is known to favor non-sequiturs ("Ground beef is really a winner nowadays") and has various theories about the qualities that make up a good sports team ("left-handedness", for example, is a highly desirable athletic quality). The best attribute anything can have, of course, is the simple ability to go "faster", which in the Faster Guy's eyes cures many of life's ills. The crowning moment of a Faster Guy segment is usually when he finally references the word "faster", underscored by a dramatic rendition of "O Fortuna.
- Paul Finebaum Calls: Fred, Rich and Jon listen to the best and strangest calls into The Paul Finebaum Show, featuring regular callers like Mildred and Charles Allen Head, known best for introducing himself by saying, "Hey, Happy Tuesday/Wednesday."
- The Townie Test: Nick finds someone at a major event, whether it be a St. Patrick's Day parade or a Dropkick Murphys concert or some other event, and Fred and Wallach attempt to guess the contestant's answers to a series of questions. The intro song is sung over Shippin' up to Boston by the Dropkick Murphys
- Mark Gemelli: Intern Nick Gemelli's father, whom Nick lived with after recovering from open heart surgery. Mark Gemelli lives in a one-bedroom apartment in the North End, overlooking the parking garage at Government Center. Mark enjoys cooking meatballs, drinking Manhattans at 3pm, and thinks his son has "dick tendencies." He has an affinity for recliners, preferring to sleep in one over his bed. Shortly before Christmas in 2018, Toucher and Rich hosted "Mark Gemelli Christmas," where Mr. Gemelli was taken to Bernie and Phyl's in Saugus, Massachusetts, and was allowed to pick out a new, free recliner. On April 8, 2022, Mr. Gemelli revealed that he witnessed part of the Government Center parking garage collapse, and was one of the first people on the scene to assist with the situation.
- Jim Gray Interview: While on "Radio Row" in Atlanta prior to Super Bowl LIII, washed-up sportscaster Jim Gray joined Fred, Rich and Jon for an interview. The exchange lasted less than five minutes, with Gray giving curt, defensive answers about his friendships with Tom Brady and Oprah Winfrey. Upon being called out by Fred for not wanting to be there, Gray wished the show luck as they went to the headlines segment. While Jon read his headlines, Gray berated Fred and Rich off-air. Gray's off-air temper tantrum was featured on the show's Twitch stream.
- Brookline 911: Also known as "Everyone's Angry in Brookline," Fred, Rich, and Jon listen to recordings of 911 calls from angry, entitled residents of Brookline, MA. Calls include a woman reporting children who were taking rocks from a local beach, a man who claimed a Trader Joe's employee laughed at him, and a Star Market shopper who inexplicably proclaims in a thick accent that he "didn't do anything, she was tagging the five-sector." Now one of the most famous segments on the show, Toucher and Rich held a live "Brookline 911" event on May 13, 2022, at the Wilbur Theater in Boston, featuring previously unaired phone calls.
- Kyle Bailey vs. Fred Toucher: Host of the afternoon drive show on WFNZ, Kyle Bailey instigated a feud with Fred in 2022, following an incident years prior when Fred hung up on a North Carolina-based sportswriter during an interview. Fred's on-air responses to Bailey's attempts at a verbal assault resulted in Bailey calling WBZ-FM program director Rick Radzik over a dozen times to complain.
- Fred's Health Issues: Known for being vocal about his personal life on the show and on social media, Fred has experienced several issues that have affected his physical and mental health. In 2020, following an incident where he arrived late for the show and announced on-air that he was getting a divorce amid slurred rambling, Fred was ordered to attend rehab for alcoholism. In 2023, Fred began to suffer from severe vocal issues as a result of an upper respiratory infection. He temporarily exited the program in April 2023 to seek medical help, with a listener recommending to him a top specialist. Following this, Fred attacked Rich and Wallach on Twitter, accusing them of not reaching out to him during his absence. Fred later retracted these claims, apologized, and ultimately deleted his Twitter account. After a purported meeting with station management in which Rich accused him of creating a toxic work environment, Fred relapsed and entered a detox facility after posting cryptic messages on social media. His health issues and absences did not affect the show's ratings, as they netted a 21.4 share for the spring 2023 period.
- Jim Irsay: Indianapolis Colts CEO Jim Irsay is a fan favorite on the program, known for his energetic personality and love for classic rock. He is perhaps best-known for his phone call to Quenton Nelson upon Nelson's drafting to the Colts in 2018, in which Irsay greeted Nelson with, "Hey Quenton, what's up man? Hey, you fired up?!" Irsay is also famous for once proclaiming, "Rush had an album [...] called Grace Under Pressure," the audio of which elicited a rare guffaw from one Fred Toettcher. Irsay ultimately joined Fred and Rich for an on-air interview on June 26, 2023, during which he rambled near-endlessly about a variety of topics.

== Former Station Affiliates ==
- WLZX (AM), East Longmeadow, Massachusetts
- WLZX-FM, Northampton, Massachusetts
- WCYY, Biddeford, Maine
- WEZQ, Bangor, Maine
- WJZN, Augusta, Maine
- WPKQ, North Conway, New Hampshire
