= WHMA =

WHMA may refer to:

- WHMA (AM), a radio station (1390 AM) licensed to Anniston, Alabama, United States
- WHMA-FM, a radio station (95.3 FM) licensed to Alexandria, Alabama
- Wiring Harness Manufacturer's Association, a trade association
