= WWWQ =

Contemporary hit radio station in Atlanta, Georgia, United States

- Atlanta, Georgia; United States
- Broadcast area: Metro Atlanta
- Frequency: 99.7 MHz (HD Radio)
- Branding: Q99.7

Programming
- Language: English
- Format: Contemporary hit radio
- Subchannels: HD2/HD3: Classic hip-hop
- Affiliations: Westwood One

Ownership
- Owner: Cumulus Media; (Radio License Holding SRC LLC)
- Sister stations: WKHX-FM; WNNX

History
- First air date: November 5, 1963
- Former call signs: WLTA (1963–1984); WRMM (1984–1985); WARM-FM (1985–1988); WAPW (1988–1992); WNNX (1992–2008)
- Call sign meaning: Chosen to match the "Q" branding

Technical information
- Licensing authority: FCC
- Facility ID: 73345
- Class: C0
- ERP: 100,000 watts
- HAAT: 340 meters (1,120 ft)
- Transmitter coordinates: 33°48′26″N 84°20′22″W
- Translator: HD2: 98.9 W255CJ (Atlanta)

Links
- Public license information: Public file; LMS
- Webcast: Listen live
- Website: www.q997atlanta.com; HD2/HD3: www.og979.com

WWWQ (99.7 FM) is a commercial radio station licensed to Atlanta, Georgia, United States, carrying a contemporary hit radio format known as "Q99.7", using the slogan "Atlanta's Hit Music". Owned by locally-based Cumulus Media, WWWQ is the Metro Atlanta affiliate for The Daly Download with Carson Daly; until October 2025, it was also the flagship station of The Bert Show. WWWQ's studios are located in the Atlanta suburb of Sandy Springs, while the station transmitter resides in Atlanta's Druid Hills neighborhood. In addition to a standard analog transmission, WWWQ broadcasts over three HD Radio channels with the second and third subchannels simulcast over a low-power FM translator and is available online.

== History ==
=== Early years (WLTA) ===
The station first signed on the air as WLTA on November 5, 1963. It was owned by Atlanta FM Broadcasters and had an easy listening format, playing 15-minute sweeps of instrumental cover versions of popular songs, along with Hollywood and Broadway showtunes. In 1974, the station was acquired by the Susquehanna Broadcasting Company.

Oddly, one of its most popular music blocks in the late 1970s was Golden Sundays, created and hosted by Jim Rich. It was a rock & roll oldies specialty show, heard from 8 to 10 pm, originating live from a restaurant in Sandy Springs. To appeal to younger listeners, WLTA began playing several soft vocals each hour. Around 1980, the playlist was approximately 50% vocals and 50% instrumentals; over time, the station gradually eliminated the instrumentals, switching to soft adult contemporary. During the 1979-80 NHL season, WLTA served as the flagship station of the Atlanta Flames hockey team in their final season before being sold and moved to Calgary.

=== Warm 100 (WRMM/WARM-FM) ===
In 1983, after WSB-FM also changed to Soft AC, WLTA increased its tempo and opened up its announcers' personalities, and would change call letters to WRMM and rebrand as "Warm 100." By 1985, with digital-tuning radios taking over from analog dials, the station began calling itself "Warm 99," since modern radios would show the dial position as 99.7 MHz. That did not sit well with WSB-FM's parent company, Cox Radio, who would sue, claiming "copyright infringement." In a landmark case, Cox v. Susquehanna Broadcasting, the judge was handed a digital radio and asked to tune to 100.0 MHz. There was no signal, because it was between channels. To find the nearest station, he pressed the "scan" button, and it stopped on WKHX-FM at 101.5 MHz. Next, he entered 99.0 MHz, which again is between channels and so contained no signal. Scanning from there, the radio hit 99.7.

In his precedent-setting decision, the federal district judge stated that on a radio dial "a radio station's frequency is its address" and one cannot copyright an address. He ruled in favor of Warm 99. A short time later, WSB-FM became known as "B98.5". WRMM would adjust its call letters slightly around this time, switching to WARM-FM.

=== Power 99 (WARM-FM/WAPW) ===
At 3 p.m. on March 5, 1986, WARM-FM went head-to-head with dominant local contemporary hit radio station WZGC, and flipped to the format as "Power 99.7". The new format launched with "The Power of Love" by Huey Lewis & the News. Z-93 eventually lost its lead, and shifted to a more rhythmic contemporary format as "Hot New Z-93" before flipping to classic rock in January 1989. WARM-FM changed its call letters to WAPW on February 10, 1988, and would rebrand as the more familiar "Power 99."

By the early 1990s, "Power 99" was considered to be one of the dominant Top 40 stations in the Southeast. However, declining ratings, as well as the success of Nirvana at the end of 1991 and the subsequent rise of "alternative" music, gave station management pause. In early September 1992, Susquehanna brought in Will Pendarvis to host an all-alternative program on weeknights called "Power 99 On the Edge". After receiving a solid amount of positive feedback, the station decided to make the full switch.

=== 99X (WNNX) ===
On October 26, 1992, at noon, "99X" made its debut, with "Video Killed The Radio Star" by The Buggles being the first song played. A month later, on November 27, 1992, the WAPW call letters were replaced with WNNX.

99X became one of the most influential alternative rock stations in the United States, and played a key role in breaking numerous acts during its early years. Music director Sean Demery's push behind The Cranberries' "Linger" in 1993 helped earn the band national attention in the U.S. On a trip to Australia in early 1995, program director Brian Phillips brought back a copy of fledgling band Silverchair's debut EP, which the station began to spin. The day after the release of the group's debut album Frogstomp, the band gave its first US performance at the Roxy in Atlanta as a "99X Freeloader Show".

WNNX's personalities during this era included Steve Barnes, Jimmy Baron, Leslie Fram, Steve Craig, Sean Demery, Will Pendarvis, Axel Lowe, Jill Nelson, Matt Jones, Fred "Toucher" Toettcher and Rich Shertenlieb; the latter two would later find success in Boston as hosts of Toucher and Rich on WBZ-FM. The station also hosted a weekly live performance series named Live X.

On May 5, 2006, Cumulus Media acquired Susquehanna Radio and all of its stations, including WNNX and sister station Q100. Over the next 20 months, Cumulus continued to support WNNX's alternative rock format, despite a noticeable decline in the Arbitron ratings.

=== Q100/Q99.7 (WWWQ) ===
The format for WWWQ originated on January 23, 2001, on 100.5 FM, when that frequency was reallocated to the Atlanta radio market from Anniston, Alabama. On January 11, 2008, Cumulus announced they would move the Top 40/CHR format of "Q100" from 100.5 to 99.7, and move "99X" to the HD2 sub-channel of 99.7 and 99x.com, at 5:30 a.m. on January 25. The final song on "99X" at 99.7 was "Good Riddance (Time of Your Life)" by Green Day. The call signs between the two stations would swap on January 29."WNNX 99.7 Atlanta 25 January 2008 Format Change". (WNNX would flip to a mainstream rock format as "Rock 100.5", before flipping to a classic alternative format under the "99X" branding in December 2022.)

Under Cumulus ownership, WWWQ briefly moved to a Hot AC format in 2009, but by 2010, had returned to CHR.

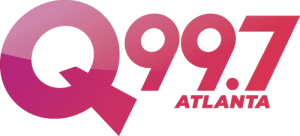
Previous logo (2019-2026)

On January 2, 2019, WWWQ rebranded as "Q99.7".

=== WWWQ-HD2 ===
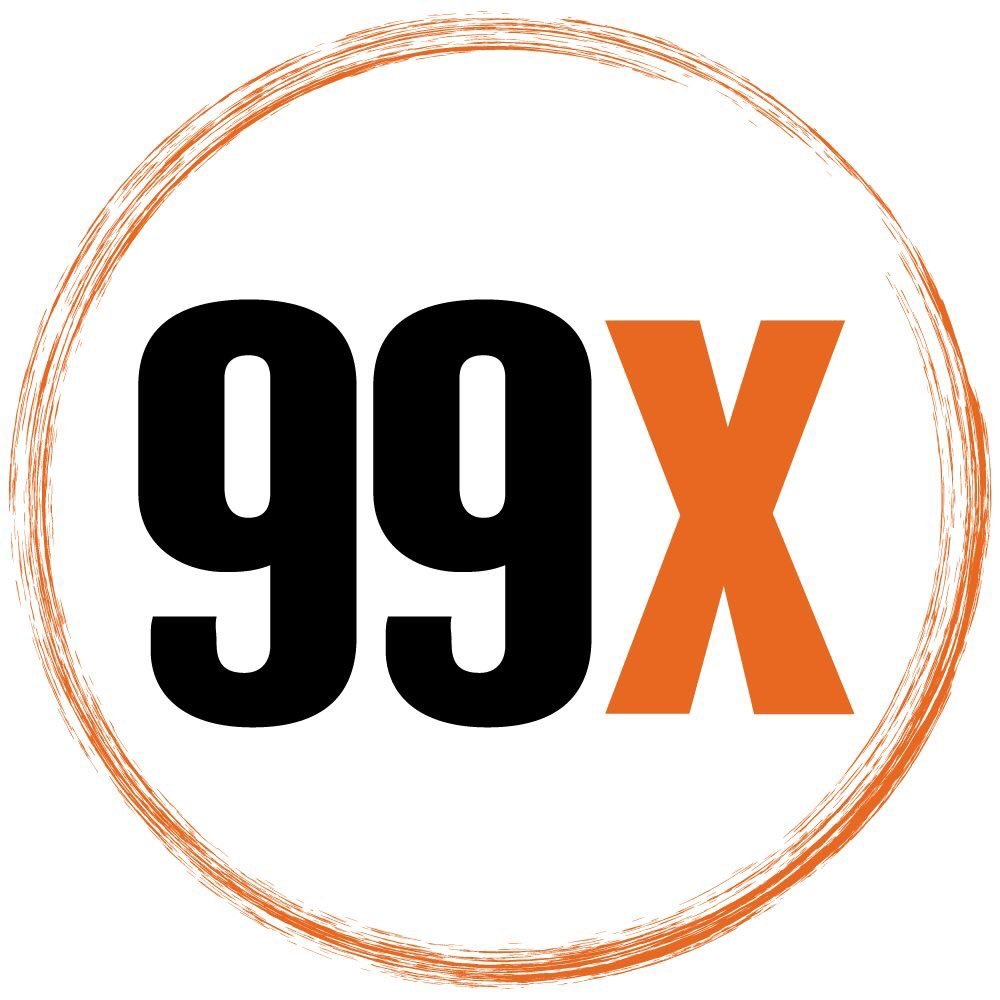
WWWQ-HD2 former logo reflecting the "99X" branding and W255CJ simulcast

WNNX signed on HD Radio operations in December 2004, with WNNX-HD2 carrying classic alternative rock branded as "99XS". Along with the format and call sign switches between WNNX and WWWQ on January 25, 2008, WNNX-HD2 (renamed WWWQ-HD2) adopted the former alternative rock format heard on WNNX, retaining the 99X brand. WWWQ-HD2 would add a simulcast via low-power translator W250BC (97.9 FM) on April 16, 2009. This simulcast would be moved to W258BU (99.1 FM) on June 9, 2011; following a few days of airing on both translators, as well as a period of stunting, W250BC would flip to a 80s/90s hits format branded as "Journey 97.9", this time relaying WWWQ's HD3 subchannel. A power increase for W258BU included a frequency change to 98.9 FM on September 15, 2011, using the W255CJ calls.

WWWQ-HD2 dropped the "99X" format for the first time on September 1, 2012, flipping to active rock as "The Bone". This format was incorporated into WNNX's format on February 1, 2013, with WWWQ-HD2 flipping to country-leaning Contemporary Christian as "98.9 The Walk"; by August 25, 2013, the subchannel and translator switched to oldies (as "Oldies 98.9") and switched again to Nash Icon on August 15, 2014. A stunt with Christmas music under the "Warm 98.9" brand began over WWWQ-HD2 on November 23, 2015, and was followed by a week-long stunt with adult contemporary starting on December 26; both the subchannel and translator reverted to alternative rock as "99X" at Midnight on January 1, 2016.

WWWQ-HD2 would temporarily lose its translator simulcast on April 12, 2018, when W255CJ was ordered off-air by the FCC due to interference complaints by WWGA in Tallapoosa. Following installation of a directional antenna to protect WWGA's signal, W255CJ resumed operations on December 21, 2018.

The "99X" format would be transplanted onto WNNX, converted into a classic alternative rock form, in December 2022; 98.9 and 99.7-HD2 would continue to simulcast the format until May 8, 2026, when Cumulus would transfer the "OG" classic hip-hop format of 97.9/99.7-HD2 ahead of the latter station's sale to Radio Training Network.

Broadcast translator for WWWQ-HD2
Call sign	Frequency	City of license	FID	ERP (W)	HAAT	Class	Transmitter coordinates	FCC info
W255CJ	98.9 FM	Atlanta	148550	180	306 m (1,004 ft)	D	33°48′26″N 84°20′22″W	LMS

=== WWWQ-HD3 ===
WWWQ-HD3 launched with the debut of "Journey 97.9" on June 9, 2011, promoted as a "journey" through 1980s and 1990s popular music. This format was dropped on September 4, 2012, in favor of a loop of the then-current Top 20 popular music songs, as well as newer hit music, modeled after SiriusXM's now-defunct Top 20 on 20 channel. Branded "Q100 20 @ 97.9", this was meant to compete with WWPW, which flipped to CHR the week before. On November 25, 2014, WWWQ-HD3 and W250BC flipped to classic hip hop as "OG 97.9", several hours before Radio One-owned WAMJ-HD2 flipped to the same format.

On May 8, 2026, Cumulus announced it would sell W250BC, as well as several other stations, to Radio Training Network, with the station set to flip to their Joy FM network of contemporary Christian music under a 10-year agreement (with an optional renewal clause for another 10 years) with Cumulus where the translator signal would begin simulcasting on WKHX-HD2. The "OG" format was immediately transferred to fellow translator 98.9/WWWQ-HD2, with the two simulcasting until the closure of the sale.

Broadcast translator for WWWQ-HD3
Call sign	Frequency	City of license	FID	ERP (W)	HAAT	Class	Transmitter coordinates	FCC info
W250BC	97.9 FM	Atlanta	158597	250	303.3 m (995 ft)	D	33°48′26″N 84°20′22″W	LMS
