= Bert's Big Adventure =

Bert's Big Adventure is a charity created by Bert Weiss of radio station WWWQ-FM (Q100) in Atlanta, United States.

Since 2003, the organization has allowed children who are chronically ill and/or physically challenged and between the ages of 5 and 12, and who prove financial need and live in the Bert Show radio listening area, with the opportunity to travel with their families to Walt Disney World in Orlando, Florida as the VIP guests of the foundation. Because of their special needs and financial strain, this is an experience that many of these children and families would not be able to experience without the help of the foundation.

The Bert's Big Adventure trip begins with a chartered flight for these children, their families and a medical staff to Walt Disney World. While in Florida, the foundation will provide hotel accommodations, Walt Disney World park passes, transportation to and from the park, and meal coupons and spending cash for these guests of the foundation.

The inaugural trip in 2003 featured five families who stayed at the Dolphin hotel near Epcot. Air travel was provided by the Atlanta Hawks and Atlanta Thrashers. The 2004 trip featured seven families, who stayed at the Animal Kingdom Lodge near Animal Kingdom. Air travel was provided by Delta Air Lines. The 17th annual trip occurred in 2019. The organization hosted 12 children and their families on the trip.

In addition to the trip to Walt Disney World, Bert's Big Adventure also provides the children certain additional charitable services that are necessary to the fulfillment of its charitable purpose. These additional charitable services are provided subsequent to any prior year's trip and are available only to the children that have participated in the Walt Disney World trip.
