= Detroit Country Day School =

Prep school in Beverly Hills, Michigan, US

Coordinates: 42°30′51.2″N 83°15′52.2″W

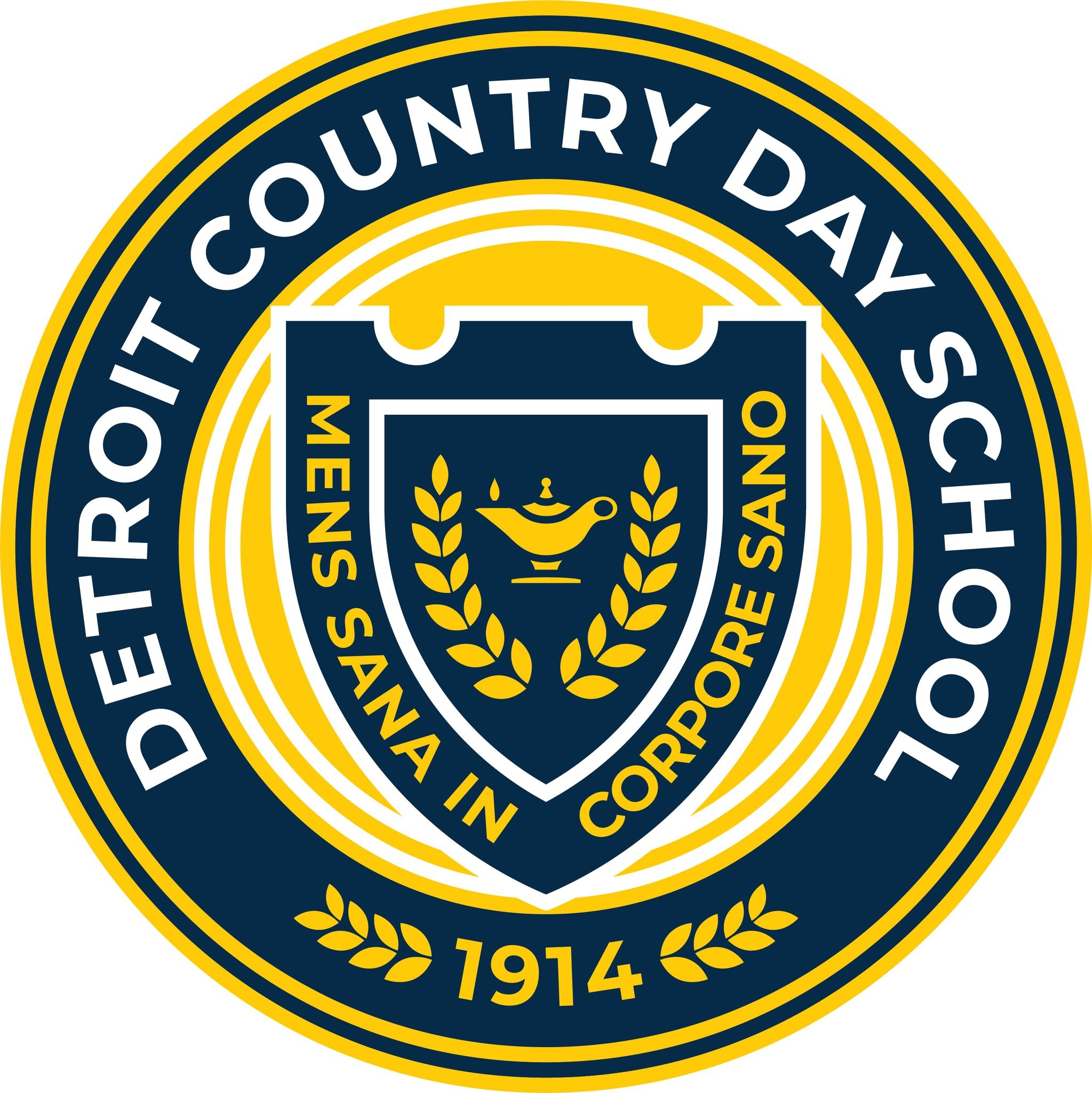

Location
- 22305 West Thirteen Mile Road; Beverly Hills, Michigan 48025; United States

Information
- School type: Private, day, college preparatory
- Motto: Mens Sana in Corpore Sano
- Religious affiliation: Nonsectarian
- Established: 1914
- Founder: F. Alden Shaw
- Head of school: Rich Dempsey
- Grades: PreK–12
- Gender: Co-Educational
- Student to teacher ratio: 8:7
- Campus type: Suburban
- Colors: Navy & Gold
- Slogan: Resilence, Determination, Sportsmanship
- Athletics: 30 Athletic teams
- Athletics conference: Michigan High School Athletic Association (MHSAA)
- Mascot: Yellowjacket
- Nickname: Yellowjackets
- Rival: Cranbrook, Divine Child High School, Brother Rice, Marian.
- Endowment: $37 million
- Tuition: $34,125 per year – Grades 9–12; $31,645 – Grades 6–8; $25,675 K–5; $21,755 Preschool–JK
- Website: dcds.edu

Detroit Country Day School (also known as DCD, DCDS, or Country Day) is a private, secular school with three campuses in Oakland County, Michigan, United States.

The administrative offices, facility services, safety and security services, and the upper school (grades 9–12) are situated in a campus in Beverly Hills. The middle school (grades 4–8) is also located in Beverly Hills, seamlessly connected to the upper school. Additionally, the Lower School (PK–3) is situated in Bloomfield Township, near Bloomfield Hills.

DCDS was founded in Detroit in 1914 by Alden Shaw inspired by the Country Day School movement. The school's motto is Mens Sana in Corpore Sano, a Latin phrase meaning "Sound Mind in a Sound Body". The school colors are blue and gold.

== History ==
Founder, F. Alden Shaw was born to Charles Joseph Shaw and Elizabeth Gahring Shaw in Detroit Lakes, Minnesota on December 20, 1885. Mr. Shaw graduated from the prestigious Boston Latin School in 1905 and Harvard College in 1909. He moved to Paris, France and enrolled in L'Ecole des Hautes Etudes, and began raising funds and recruiting students to begin his dream of founding a private school for boys. He soon realized that circumstances in Paris made founding a school an unreasonably daunting task; he decided to return to the United States. On the ship back to America, Mr. Shaw recalls an acquaintance raving about the wondrous opportunities in the blossoming American city of Detroit, Michigan and decided to build a school there.

In the spring of 1914, F. Alden Shaw, under the name Detroit Preparatory School, submitted the following advertisement to the local paper:

Mr. F. Alden Shaw, A.B. (Harvard 1909), announces that September next, he will open a small school for boys. Having had experience as a teacher in Boston, and as a private tutor in the families of Mr. George Lee of Boston, and Mr. Edwin D. Morgan of New York, he comes to Detroit, where there would seem to be a larger field for him. Referring by permission to Reverend Eugene Rodman Shippin, Mr. D. Stearns of Fredrick Stearns and Company and to Mr. Charles Moore, Security Trust Company, Detroit, Michigan. (For appointments address F. A. Shaw, Care Y.M.C.A., Detroit, Michigan.)

== Academics ==
The Detroit Country Day Upper School offers a strong and varied program that provides numerous opportunities for students to demonstrate their individual strengths and develop their potential. The rigorous college-preparatory program, which includes Honors and Advanced Placement courses in each discipline in addition to a diverse selection of electives, prepares students for the college and university setting. In addition to a series of honors and Advanced Placement courses, students at Detroit Country Day Upper School may pursue an International Baccalaureate Diploma. Most graduating classes consist of 140 to 180 students, 100% of which are accepted at accredited four-year colleges and universities. From the start of Freshman year, Upper School students participate yearly in standardized testing, beginning with the PLAN in 9th grade to the PSAT in 10th and 11th grade to finally, the ACT and/or SAT during the 11th and 12th grade. The College Counseling Office hosts yearly College Night for every grade to keep students and parents informed about the college application process. Every year, numerous Country Day students achieve National Merit Semi-finalist and Finalist status.

== Athletics ==
Extracurricular activities are required at DCDS. Under the "points system", these requirements are tracked by the accumulation of blue points (athletics), gold points (clubs) and white points (service).

In March 2004 the Michigan High School Athletic Association recommended that DCDS voluntarily forfeit three state basketball championships won between 1989 and 1991, claiming that former DCDS star Chris Webber had violated his amateur status via his relationship with University of Michigan athletic booster Ed Martin. DCDS declined to follow the MHSAA's suggestion.

== Arts ==
Detroit Country Day School offers an active fine and performing arts program, celebrated every April through "Celebrate the Arts" weekend at the Upper School campus. Students may also enroll in the Conservatory Program, focusing on study of an artistic discipline with the options of dance, filmmaking, fine arts, music and theatre.

== Notable alumni ==
=== Arts, film, theater, and broadcasting ===
- Abby Quinn – actress
- Betsy Thomas – television writer and producer
- Fred Toettcher - Marconi Award-winning radio personality; did not graduate.
- Courtney B. Vance – Emmy- and Tony-winning actor
- Robin Williams – Oscar-winning actor and comedian; left prior to graduation
- Taylor Hale – winner of Big Brother 24

=== Business ===
- Steve Ballmer – former CEO of Microsoft (2000-2014), and current owner of NBA's Los Angeles Clippers.
- Semon Knudsen – former head of GM's Chevrolet division and president of Ford Motor Company
- Scott Seligman – real estate developer, founder of Sterling Bank and Trust FSB, minority owner of San Francisco Giants

=== Law ===
- Neomi Rao – former administrator of the Office of Information and Regulatory Affairs, judge of the United States Court of Appeals for the District of Columbia Circuit
- Robert P. Young Jr. – former Michigan Supreme Court Justice

=== Science, medicine, and engineering ===
- Paul Kalas – astronomer

=== Politics and government ===
- Vishal Amin – Intellectual Property Enforcement Coordinator (IPEC) in the Trump administration
- Jagmeet Singh – former leader of the Canadian federal New Democratic Party
- Buzz Thomas – state senator
- Arvind Venkat – physician and member of the Pennsylvania House of Representatives

=== Sports ===
==== Basketball ====
- Shane Battier – Mr. Michigan Basketball, Duke University player, NCAA national champion, MOP of championship game, 2-time NBA champion with Miami Heat
- Keith Benson – former NBA player for Golden State Warriors
- Ray McCallum Jr. – NBA player for Charlotte Hornets
- JaVale McGee – NBA player and three-time NBA champion, having won consecutive titles with the Golden State Warriors in 2017 and 2018 before winning a third title with the Lakers in 2020; left DCDS prior to graduation
- Carrie Moore - college basketball coach
- Aerial Powers – WNBA player for Minnesota Lynx
- Austin Price – player in the Israeli Premier Basketball League
- Edmond Sumner – NBA guard for the Indiana Pacers
- Chris Webber – five-time NBA All-Star, five-time All-NBA Team member, former NBA Rookie of the Year, and former number one overall NBA draftee. As a collegiate athlete, he led the Michigan Wolverines' 1991 incoming freshman class known as the Fab Five. 2021 Naismith Basketball Hall of Fame inductee
- David Webber - Mid-American Conference Men's Basketball Player of the Year

==== Football ====
- Kenny Demens – linebacker for the University of Michigan and the Arizona Cardinals
- Bennie Fowler – wide receiver for Michigan State University, Super Bowl 50 champion Denver Broncos and the New York Giants
- Jonas Gray – running back for the University of Notre Dame, the New England Patriots and the Jacksonville Jaguars
- Javin Hunter – wide receiver for the University of Notre Dame, Baltimore Ravens and the San Francisco 49ers. NFL player
- Isaiah Johnson – NFL cornerback for the Miami Dolphins
- Caleb Tiernan – offensive lineman for Northwestern University

==== Hockey ====
- Patrick Kane – NHL player for 3-time Stanley Cup champion Chicago Blackhawks; left DCDS prior to graduation

==== Soccer ====
- Kate Markgraf – professional soccer player, NCAA, Olympic and World Cup champion

==== Tennis ====
- Michael Russell – professional tennis player
