= Flashback (radio program) =

- Matt Pinfield with the Flashback logo
- Genre: Classic rock, Retrospective
- Running time: Approx. 4 hrs. (including commercials)
- Country of origin: United States
- Syndicates: Westwood One
- Hosted by: Leslie Fram (2025) long term substitute Matt Pinfield (2012-present); Bill St. James (1986-2012)
- Created by: Dan Formento and Bill St. James
- Produced by: Kevin Horton
- Original release: 1986 – present
- Website: www.benztown.com/flashback/

Flashback is an American radio show syndicated by Westwood One. Flashback plays a diverse mix of classic rock from the 1960s, 1970s, and 1980s. Other show elements include newscasts, classic TV and movie clips, commercials and comedy bits to create thematic segments from the 1960s into the 1990s. The four-hour program is syndicated to over 200 radio affiliates in the United States and Canada.

Flashback was originally hosted by voiceover artist Bill St. James. In early January 2012 it was announced that St. James had "stepped aside" and would be replaced by then-120 Minutes host Matt Pinfield. St. James hosted his final edition of Flashback the weekend of January 14 & 15, 2012 and a week later on January 21 & 22, 2012, Pinfield assumed hosting duties. During the St. James tenure the show did not utilize guest hosts. In the Pinfield tenure, the year 2017 saw six shows guest hosted by San Francisco radio personality Steven Seaweed. In January 2025 radio host Leslie Fram began guest hosting the show each weekend after Matt Pinfield suffered a stroke.

Two months after departing Flashback, original host Bill St. James began hosting a similar show for the United Stations Radio Networks called Time Warp with Bill St. James. The show follows a near identical format to Flashback, presenting four hours of classic rock music mixed with other sound clips from the time period. There are a few differences in the shows. The Flashback News segment that kicks off the last hour of the show is referred to as What Happened This Week on Time Warp. Additionally, whereas the Pinfield era of Flashback has begun to introduce early '90s music and themes, Time Warp with Bill St. James has not.

Beginning with the weekend of January 18/19, 2025, Leslie Fram began guest hosting the show following Matt Pinfield's stroke. After a long recovery, Pinfield returned for the show's June 14/15, 2025 Father's Day weekend edition.

From 2021-2024, the first and fourth hours of each show were produced new while utilizing reruns for the second and third. Meanwhile, as of 2025, Time Warp with Bill St. James stopped producing new shows in early 2017 and now follows a four-year cycle, re-airing programs aired four (and eight) years earlier, albeit with three or four song substitutions per playlist. (example: the show airing the first weekend of November 2023 was the show that aired the first weekend of November 2019 and the first weekend of November 2015)

== Flashback Pop Quiz ==
In addition to the original show, Benztown Radio Networks/ Cumulus Media also produce the weekly Flashback Pop Quiz, a trivia program also once hosted by St. James. Each week, questions are asked about pop culture from the 1960s to present day. If questions are answered correctly, prizes given away are CDs, DVDs, CD-ROM games, T-shirts, books, caps and other pop culture memorabilia.
