= WKHX-FM =

Radio station in Marietta, Georgia

- Marietta, Georgia; United States
- Broadcast area: Metro Atlanta
- Frequency: 101.5 MHz (HD Radio)
- Branding: New Country 101.5 (stylized as “101.Five")

Programming
- Format: Country music
- Affiliations: Westwood One

Ownership
- Owner: Cumulus Media; (Radio License Holdings LLC)
- Sister stations: WNNX; WWWQ

History
- First air date: November 11, 1959; 66 years ago
- Former call signs: WBIE-FM (1959–81); WKHX (1981–87)
- Call sign meaning: "Kicks" (former branding)

Technical information
- Licensing authority: FCC
- Facility ID: 73161
- Class: C0
- ERP: 100,000 watts
- HAAT: 329 meters (1,079 ft)
- Transmitter coordinates: 33°48′26″N 84°20′22″W

Links
- Public license information: Public file; LMS
- Webcast: Listen live Listen live via iHeart
- Website: www.newcountry1015.com

WKHX-FM (101.5 MHz) is a commercial radio station licensed to Marietta, Georgia, featuring a country music format known as "New Country 101.5". Owned by Cumulus Media, the station serves Metro Atlanta. It is the flagship station for the syndicated wake up show Kincaid and Dallas. WKHX-FM's studios are located in Sandy Springs

WKHX-FM has an effective radiated power (ERP) of 100,000 watts, the maximum for most FM stations. The transmitter is off Briarcliff Road NE (Georgia State Route 42), west of Emory University, in North Druid Hills. WKHX-FM broadcasts using HD Radio technology.

== History ==
=== WBIE-FM ===
The station signed on the air on November 11, 1959. The original call sign was WBIE-FM, the sister station of WBIE 1080 AM (now WFTC). They were owned by Marietta Broadcasting and mostly simulcast their programming. In February 1968, WBIE-FM broke away from the simulcast. It began an automated country music format. The station manager at the time, James M. Wilder, has a technology laboratory building named after him at Southern Polytechnic State University in Marietta.

Initially, WBIE-FM was powered at 1,350 watts, a fraction of its current output. It was only heard in and around Marietta. In the 1970s, WBIE-FM boosted its power to the legal maximum of 100,000 watts, and became audible in Metro Atlanta. Its AM companion at 1080 switched its format to adult standards and its call sign to WCOB. The power boost made WBIE-FM a candidate to be bought by a large broadcasting company anxious for a strong FM signal in the growing Atlanta radio market.

=== Kicks 101.5 ===
"Kicks 101.5" debuted in November 1981 after Capital Cities Communications purchased WBIE-FM. Capital Cities switched WBIE-FM's call letters to WKHX and made the station a contender in the Atlanta Arbitron ratings. In 1987, WKHX programming began to be simulcast on co-owned AM 590, formerly known as WAGA and WPLO. The AM station became WKHX, while 101.5 added an FM suffix, becoming WKHX-FM. Today, AM 590 is Christian radio WDWD, owned by Salem Media.

Capital Cities took over ABC, including its television and radio stations, in 1985. In 1995, ABC bought WKHX-FM's rival country station, 106.7 WYAY. Eventually, WYAY switched to an all news radio format, and today is Christian Contemporary-formatted WAKL after being sold to the Educational Media Foundation in 2019. In December 2006, WKHX-FM got a new country music competitor in WUBL, owned by Clear Channel Communications (now iHeartMedia).

=== Cumulus Media ===
WKHX-FM and other ABC Radio stations were acquired by Citadel Broadcasting in 2007, which was absorbed into Cumulus Media in September 2011. In October 2011, WKHX-FM modified its playlist from playing only "new country" music to mixing in some older hits from the 1990s to the present.

On November 13, 2019, WKHX began running liners promoting a "big announcement" to come at 3 p.m. the following day. Several liners had a wolf-howling sound effect, a nod to rumors on radio news websites that the station was to rebrand as "The Wolf". At the promised time, the station rebranded, but instead of "The Wolf" it became "New Country 101.Five." The station also introducing a new morning show host, JJ Kincaid, to team with existing co-host Dallas McCade. Their new program is called "Kincaid and Dallas". The show has since been syndicated to other country stations, many also owned by Cumulus Media.

On May 8, 2026, Cumulus announced an agreement with Radio Training Network to begin simulcasting their The Joy FM network of contemporary Christian music on the HD2 subchannel of WKHX, alongside FM translator W250BC, with the agreement set for 10 years and carrying an optional renewal clause for an additional 10 years.
