= Scott Seligman =

American real estate developer

- Born: 1951 or 1952 (age 74–75)
- Education: B.A. University of Michigan
- Occupations: real estate developer bank executive
- Known for: founder of Sterling Bank and Trust minority owner of the San Francisco Giants
- Parent: Irving R. Seligman

Scott Seligman (born 1951/1952) is an American real estate developer, the founder of the Sterling Bank and Trust FSB, and minority owner of the San Francisco Giants major league baseball team.

== Biography ==
Seligman was born in Detroit, Michigan, the son of Irving R. Seligman. His father founded Seligman & Associates, Inc. in 1954 which initially focused on building garages in Detroit but soon expanded into building single family homes in Detroit and Las Vegas.

He attended the Detroit Country Day School and graduated with a B.A. from University of Michigan. In 1971, Seligman & Associates went public and in 1973, Seligman joined his father's company as Vice President of Seligman of Florida, Inc. In 1976, he became Vice-President of Seligman & Associates, responsible for building single-family homes and managing owned multi-family properties; and in 1977, he became president, director, and CEO of Seligman & Associates. By 1982, Seligman had developed over 13,500 units and expanded into the cable television business.

In 1984, Seligman founded the Sterling Savings and Loan Association which focused on residential mortgage lending and servicing. In 1987, the Seligman family took Seligman private. In 1990, Sterling expanded into commercial real estate lending. In 1993, Sterling Savings and Loan was renamed Sterling Bank and Trust, FSB and by 1995, the bank had $78 million in assets. By 2015, Sterling had grown to $1.3 billion in assets with 18 branches in the San Francisco area while maintaining its headquarters in Southfield, Michigan. In 1999, Seligman retired from Sterling to focus on real estate activities reallocating the bulk of the firms' portfolio to California by selling most of its Detroit area assets. In 2017, Sterling Bank and Trust went public and in 2025, it was acquired by Everbank Financial Corp. of Florida.

In 2021, Seligman co-founded BOA acquisition Corp with Shane Battier, vice president of data analytics of the Miami Heat. BOA's focus was to acquire companies in the property technology area leveraging Battier's technology expertise and Seligman's real estate experience. After a successful listing on the New York Stock Exchange (NYSE: BOAS), the company was acquired in October 2022 in a reverse merger transaction by Selina Hospitality PLC, a Generation Z and Millennial focused hospitality chain catering to digital nomads.

In 1992, he became a minority owner of the San Francisco Giants major league baseball team as part of an ownership group (San Francisco Baseball Associates LLC) led by Charles Bartlett Johnson (which then also included Peter Magowan, Allan Byer, David S. Wolff, Harmon Burns, and Larry Baer), that purchased the team from Bob Lurie.

== Philanthropy ==
Seligman was active in Jewish causes. Seligman has served on the Capital Planning Committee at the Jewish Community Federation of San Francisco, was a board member of the Jewish Federation of Las Vegas, served on the board of the Jewish Telegraphic Agency, and served as a Committee Member with Birthright Israel.

He donated to and named the new Santa Fe Jewish Center-Chabad in historic Santa Fe.
