= Javin Hunter =

American football player (born 1980)

No. 84
- Position: Wide receiver

Personal information
- Born: May 9, 1980 (age 46); Detroit, Michigan, U.S.
- Listed height: 6 ft 1 in (1.85 m)
- Listed weight: 190 lb (86 kg)

Career information
- High school: Detroit Country Day School (Beverly Hills, Michigan)
- College: Notre Dame (1998–2001)
- NFL draft: 2002: 6th round, 206th overall pick

Career history
- Baltimore Ravens (2002–2004); Carolina Panthers (2005)*; San Francisco 49ers (2005)*
- * Offseason or practice squad member only

Career NFL statistics
- Receptions: 5
- Receiving yards: 35
- Stats at Pro Football Reference

Javin Edward Hunter (born May 9, 1980) is an American former professional football player who was a wide receiver in the National Football League (NFL). He played college football at the University of Notre Dame and was selected by the Baltimore Ravens in the sixth round of the 2002 NFL draft. He also played a season for the San Francisco 49ers. Hunter's father James also played in the NFL and his son Jaden Ivey played college basketball for the Purdue Boilermakers and played in the NBA for the Detroit Pistons and the Chicago Bulls.

== Early life and college ==
Hunter attended high school at Detroit Country Day School in Beverly Hills, Michigan, where he was a 3-time All-State and USA Today All-American basketball player while teaming with former Miami Heat player and Duke standout Shane Battier as well as Mid-American Conference Men's Basketball Player of the Year David Webber. He was a three-time Michigan High School Athletic Association Class B state basketball champion.

In football, he was a first-team Parade All-American, USA Today second-team All-American, rated 34th best player nationally by The Sporting News and 37th best player by Chicago Sun-Times. He was also rated one of the top 3 wide receivers in the country by the Dallas Morning News, PrepStar and Street and Smith magazine. Hunter was a top recruit for the legendary and former Notre Dame wide receiver coach Urban Meyer and committed to the University of Notre Dame.

In a run-heavy Notre Dame offense under Bob Davie, he was Notre Dame's top receiver in 2001 and led the team in catches and receiving yards that same year. He was also a member of the Irish basketball team in his freshman year under former NBA coach John Macleod. Hunter's father was James Hunter, a former all-pro defensive back for the Detroit Lions from 1976 to 1982.

== Professional career ==
Hunter was selected by the Baltimore Ravens in the sixth round of the 2002 NFL draft with the 206th overall pick. He first showed promise as a rookie scoring two touchdowns, including one on a 99-yard kick return against the New York Jets. Hunter was named one of ten rookies to watch for the 2002 season by The Sporting News. He finished the 2002 season playing in 12 games, 4 of them starts. He also averaged 26.3 yards on kick returns, including a 63-yard return against the Indianapolis Colts.

The next year, Hunter tore his Achilles tendon during training camp and missed the entire season. In 2004, he made the switch to cornerback from wide receiver. However, after an injury during camp he was given an injury settlement by the Ravens. Hunter was then picked up by the San Francisco 49ers in 2005.

== Personal life ==
Hunter has a son, Jaden Ivey, with former University of Notre Dame point guard and current women's basketball head coach Niele Ivey. Jaden was an All-American basketball player at Purdue University and last played in the NBA for the Chicago Bulls. Hunter has another son, Jordan Hunter, currently attending Hargrave Military Academy in Chatham, VA.

Javin currently works with the NFL Players Trust, an affiliate of the NFL Players Association, helping former players transition away from the NFL.
