= Steve Barnes (actor) =

American actor

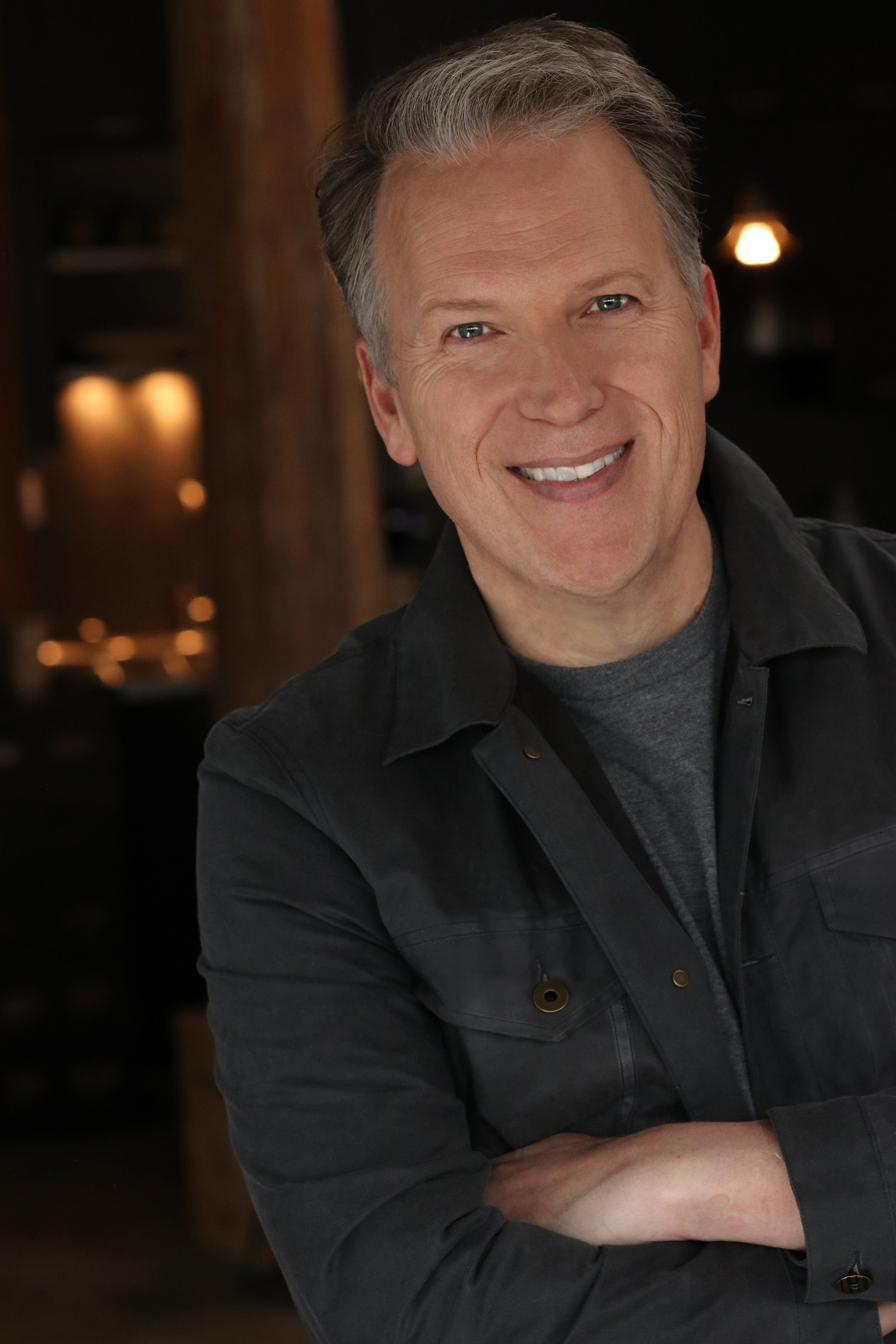
- Barnes in 2024
- Born: Stephen Barnes; Corpus Christi, TX
- Education: University of Texas at Austin
- Occupations: Actor, producer, radio personality
- Website: mrstevebarnes.com

Steve Barnes is an American television and film actor, television host, television and film producer, radio personality, and digital and social media executive. He is president of Barnes Creative Studios in Atlanta, Georgia, which specializes in digital marketing and social media strategy.

His acting career, which began in 1991, has comprised lead and supporting roles in several films, including The Joneses, Sex & Consequences, and No Witness. He has performed guest-starring and recurring roles in several television shows, including currently starring in the recurring role as General Cunningham in Tyler Perry's The Oval, Drop Dead Diva, One Tree Hill, Prison Break, Matchpoint, Men On Pause, MTV’s Road Rules, Guiding Light, Ned & Stacey, As the World Turns, and The Young and the Restless. In 2009, Barnes created, starred in, and produced the television series High Rise.

From 1994 to 2003, Barnes co-hosted the Atlanta morning radio show The Morning X with Barnes, Leslie & Jimmy on 99X WNNX with Leslie Fram and Jimmy Baron, earning Billboard Magazine’s National Major Market Morning Show Award in 1996 and Radio and Records’ National Major Market Morning Show of 1999. On January 5, 2023, Barnes returned to 99X Atlanta and relaunched "The Morning X" brand.

== Early and personal life ==
Barnes grew up in Corpus Christi, Texas, and graduated from Mary Carroll High School in 1985. From 1998 to 2008, he was married to Stacey Sward and has 2 children from that marriage. In 2012, Barnes married Heather Searing Cook.

== Credits ==
=== Radio ===
- KEXX, Corpus Christi, TX, 6-10 pm, 1984-1985
- KPEZ, Austin, TX, Swing Shift, 1986-1987
- KBTS, Austin, TX, Swing Shift, 1987-1990
- KISQ, Corpus Christi, TX, 6-10 am, 1989-1990
- KBEQ, Kansas City, MO, 6-10 pm, 1990-1993
- WNNX, Atlanta, GA, 4-7 pm, 1993-1994
- WNNX, Atlanta, GA, 6-10 am, The Morning X with Barnes, Leslie & Jimmy, 1994-2003
- WZGC, Atlanta, GA, 6-10 am, All Access with Barnes & Firfer, 2004-2006
- WRDA - weekends, Sept 2013–???
- WNNX - 6-10 am, January 5, 2023 – Present

=== Film ===
- The Joneses: Guy
- Sex & Consequences: Rev. Jim
- No Witness (feature): Paul Arkadian
- No Witness (short): Leiter
- Insanity: Tad Logan
- The Number: Chip Harding
- Losing Grace: Jeff
- Remember the Titans: Titan Supporter
- Irresistible Jimmy

=== Television ===
- Tyler Perry's The Oval (recurring): General Cunningham
- Stuff You Should Know: Flip Storminson
- High Rise: Series creator, executive producer, series regular “Austin Prescott”
- Drop Dead Diva: Gary Monroe
- One Tree Hill: Starter
- Prison Break (recurring): Agent Drucker
- Matchpoint: Himself
- Men on Pause: Douglas
- MTV’s Road Rules: Himself
- Guiding Light: Fireman
- Ned & Stacey: Customer
- As The World Turns: Perp
- The Young & The Restless: Business Man
- Saints & Sinners: Anthony
- Your Honor: Jeremy
- Government Records - The Rundown: Jack Aaron

== Awards ==
- Favorite Radio DJ – Creative Loafing Magazine, 1993, 1994, 1995, 1996, 1999, 2000
- Best Radio Voice – Creative Loafing Magazine, 1996, 1997
- Best Morning Show – Atlanta Magazine, 1996
- National Major Market Morning Show - Billboard Magazine, 1996
- Best Morning Show - Atlanta AIR Awards, 1996
- Best Morning Show – Atlanta Press, 1999
- National Major Market Morning Show Award – Radio & Records, 1999
