= Shane Battier =

American basketball player (born 1978)

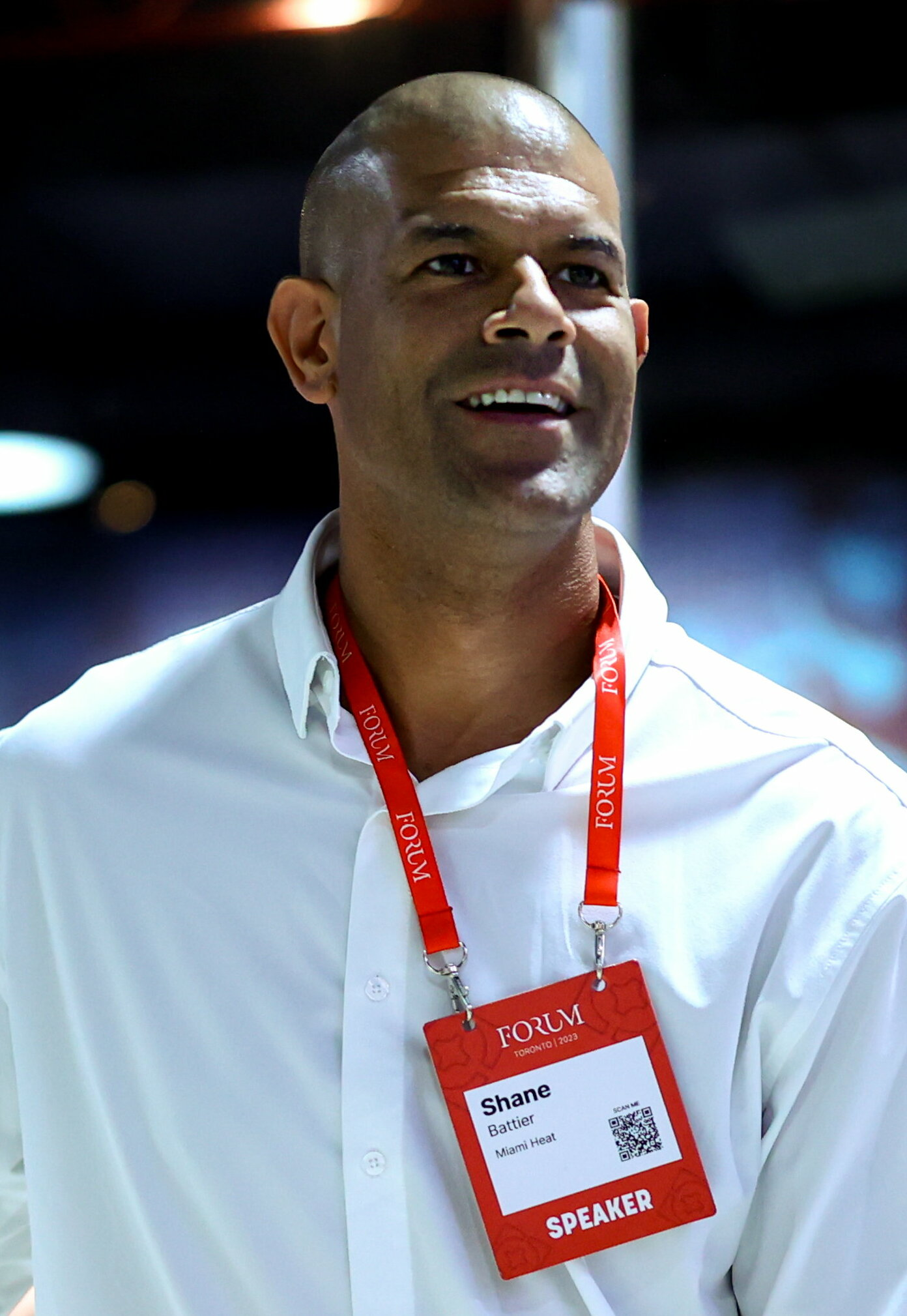
- Battier in 2023

Miami Heat
- Title: Consultant
- League: NBA

Personal information
- Born: September 9, 1978 (age 48) Birmingham, Michigan, U.S.
- Listed height: 6 ft 8 in (2.03 m)
- Listed weight: 220 lb (100 kg)

Career information
- High school: Detroit Country Day School (Beverly Hills, Michigan)
- College: Duke (1997–2001)
- NBA draft: 2001: 1st round, 6th overall pick
- Drafted by: Vancouver Grizzlies
- Playing career: 2001–2014
- Position: Small forward
- Number: 31

Career history
- 2001–2006: Memphis Grizzlies
- 2006–2011: Houston Rockets
- 2011: Memphis Grizzlies
- 2011–2014: Miami Heat

Career highlights
- 2× NBA champion (2012, 2013); 2× NBA All-Defensive Second Team (2008, 2009); NBA All-Rookie First Team (2002); NCAA champion (2001); NCAA Final Four Most Outstanding Player (2001); National college player of the year (2001); Consensus first-team All-American (2001); Consensus second-team All-American (2000); 3× NABC Defensive Player of the Year (1999–2001); Chip Hilton Player of the Year (2001); ACC Athlete of the Year (2001); ACC co-Player of the Year (2001); Academic All-American of the Year (2001); 2× First-team All-ACC (2000, 2001); No. 31 retired by Duke Blue Devils; Naismith Prep Player of the Year (1997); Morgan Wootten National Player of the Year (1997); First-team Parade All-American (1997); Second-team Parade All-American (1996); McDonald's All-American (1997); Mr. Basketball of Michigan (1997)

Career statistics
- Points: 8,408 (8.6 ppg)
- Rebounds: 4,082 (4.2 rpg)
- Assists: 1,717 (1.8 apg)
- Stats at NBA.com
- Stats at Basketball Reference
- Collegiate Basketball Hall of Fame
Medals
Men's basketball
Representing the United States
FIBA World Championship
| Bronze medal – third place | 2006 Japan | National team |
Goodwill Games
| Gold medal – first place | 2001 Brisbane | National team |

Shane Courtney Battier (/ˈbætieɪ/ BAT-ee-ay; born September 9, 1978) is an American former professional basketball player.

Battier is best known for his four years playing basketball at Duke, his 13 years playing in the National Basketball Association (NBA), and his participation on the U.S. national team. His teams won championships at the college, professional, and international levels. He has also worked for ESPN as a broadcaster.

Since his retirement, Battier has pursued a career in business. He has been a minority owner of the Tampa Bay Rays of Major League Baseball since 2025 along with others in his limited ownership partnership group such as Temerity Baseball (Andy Sandler) and Mike Salvino, and has served on the board of directors at Yext.

== Early life ==
Battier was born and raised in Birmingham, Michigan, and attended Detroit Country Day School in nearby Beverly Hills, where he won many awards including the 1997 Mr. Basketball award. Battier was an outlier from his childhood; by the time he entered Country Day as a seventh-grader, he was already 6 ft 4 in (1.93 m), and was 6 ft 7 in (2.01 m) a year later. He was also the only child in the school with a black father and a white mother.

As Michael Lewis put it in a 2009 article, the young Battier "was shuttling between a black world that treated him as white and a white world that treated him as black...the inner-city kids with whom he played on the Amateur Athletic Union (A.A.U.) circuit treated Battier like a suburban kid with a white game, and the suburban kids he played with during the regular season treated him like a visitor from the planet where they kept the black people."

Battier was a three-time Michigan High School Athletic Association Class B state champion with teammates Javin Hunter and David Webber.

== College career ==
Battier graduated from Detroit Country Day School with a 3.96 grade point average and was named the school's outstanding student in his senior year. He went on to attend Duke, where he played four years under head coach Mike Krzyzewski. While at Duke, Battier was often the best defender on the court. He frequently took charges which prompted the Cameron Crazies to chant, "Who's your daddy? Battier!"

He led the Duke Blue Devils men's basketball to two Final Fours, in 1999 and 2001, though his team in 1998 squandered a late 17-point lead to eventual national champion Kentucky in the regional finals. The Blue Devils lost to the Connecticut Huskies in the 1999 NCAA Division I men's basketball tournament, but came back to win the national championship by defeating the Arizona Wildcats two years later. In 2001, Battier was a consensus national player of the year with honors including the Naismith, Associated Press and Sporting News College Player of the Year awards; the John R. Wooden Award; and the Oscar Robertson and Adolph Rupp trophies. The Blue Devils later retired his No. 31 jersey. Battier was three times named the NABC Defensive Player of the Year.

Battier (778) and Jason Williams on the 2001 national championship team were one of only two Duke duos to each score over 700 points in a season, the other duo being Jon Scheyer (728) and Kyle Singler (707) in the 2009–10 season. Battier graduated from Duke with a major in religion.

After the conclusion of his college career, Battier was named to the ACC 50th Anniversary men's basketball team. Battier was a two-time Academic All-American and Academic All-American of the year in 2001.

He was second behind Jon Scheyer in the Duke record book for minutes played in a single season as of March 28, 2010, and had 36 double-figure scoring games in a single season (tied for 5th-most in Duke history, with Scheyer, Jason Williams, and JJ Redick). Battier also held the unofficial record among NCAA Division I men's players for most games won in a career with 131, a record that would fall in 2017 to Gonzaga's Przemek Karnowski.

== NBA career ==
=== Memphis Grizzlies (2001–2006) ===
Battier was selected by the Vancouver Grizzlies with the sixth pick of the first round of the 2001 NBA draft. At the time, the Grizzlies were in the process of moving from Vancouver to Memphis. Pau Gasol of Spain was selected in the same draft with the number three pick, by the Atlanta Hawks, then traded to the Vancouver Grizzlies.

Battier was a versatile player with the size to play inside and the range to score from further out (particularly the corner three-pointer). However, he made his living as a hustle player on the defensive end, where he defended three positions (shooting guard, power forward, small forward) with a high degree of skill, netted a good number of blocks and steals, dove for loose balls, and frequently drew offensive fouls from his opponent.

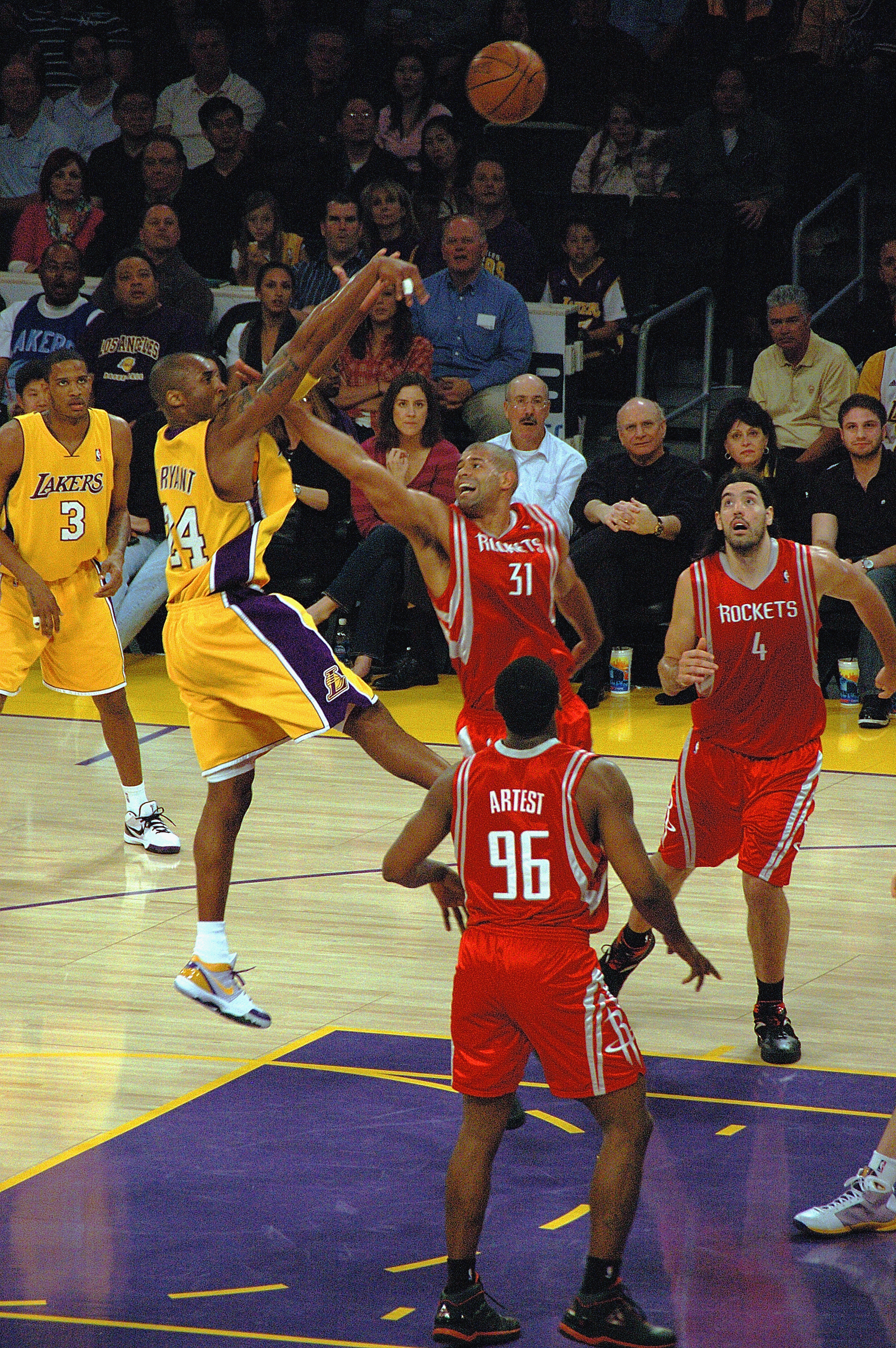
Battier applying his signature "hand-in-the-face" shot contest against Kobe Bryant, April 2009

=== Houston Rockets (2006–2011) ===
On June 28, 2006, Battier was traded by the Grizzlies to the Houston Rockets in exchange for Stromile Swift and the Rockets' number 8 selection Rudy Gay in the 2006 NBA draft.

Battier has often been called "the ultimate glue guy" for playing sound, fundamental, team-oriented basketball, making his teammates more effective without flash or padding his own stats, and for making the most of his skills with discipline and hustle rather than raw athleticism. He's also known for his extensive preparation in studying the opposing team and the player he is assigned to guard: "I try to prepare for my opponent as thoroughly as possible. I want to know every angle on the man I am guarding to give me an edge. I read many, many pages and go over strengths and weaknesses many times before a game. Proper Preparation Prevents Poor Performance. That is a motto I like." The Rockets made him the team's only player with access to its highly sophisticated statistical data that they compiled on all opposing players; he used this data to become familiar with the tendencies of the players he would guard in each game. In a game between the Rockets and San Antonio Spurs in the 2007–08 season in which he was assigned to guard Manu Ginóbili, because Ginóbili was playing off the bench and his minutes were not in sync with those of typical NBA starters, Battier went to Rockets coach Rick Adelman before the game and asked to be kept out of the starting lineup and substituted in whenever Ginóbili entered the game. Rockets general manager Daryl Morey later said about the incident, "No one in the NBA does that. No one says put me on the bench so I can guard their best scorer all the time."

He played for the US national team in the 2006 FIBA World Championship, winning a bronze medal.

On February 17, 2010, in a game against the Milwaukee Bucks, Battier scored 20 points, shooting 6–6 from 3-point territory, to go along with his 10 rebounds. During the latter part of the season, Battier lost his starting spot to the returning Trevor Ariza. Battier, however, made it perfectly clear that starting a game or hearing his name before a game was not important to him. On March 21, 2010, in a game against the New York Knicks, Battier suffered a season-ending knee injury.

On December 17, Battier recorded his first double-double of the season, finishing with 17 points (including 5 three-pointers) and 10 rebounds to go with 5 assists, 3 blocks, and a steal. On January 24, 2011, Battier scored a season-high 19 points (including 5 three-pointers) in a win over the Minnesota Timberwolves. On February 5, Battier recorded a season-high 13 rebounds in an overtime win over the Utah Jazz. On February 14, Battier went a perfect 7–7 from the field (including 3–3 on three-pointers), finishing with 17 points, in a 121–102 win over the Denver Nuggets.

=== Return to Memphis (2011) ===
On February 24, Battier was traded by the Houston Rockets back to the Memphis Grizzlies, where Battier was originally drafted and played the first years of his career, in exchange for center Hasheem Thabeet, DeMarre Carroll, and a 1st round draft pick. On April 17, with Memphis down by two, Battier made the game-winning three, helping Memphis to its first playoff win in franchise history, following losses in its first 12 playoff games.

=== Miami Heat (2011–2014) ===
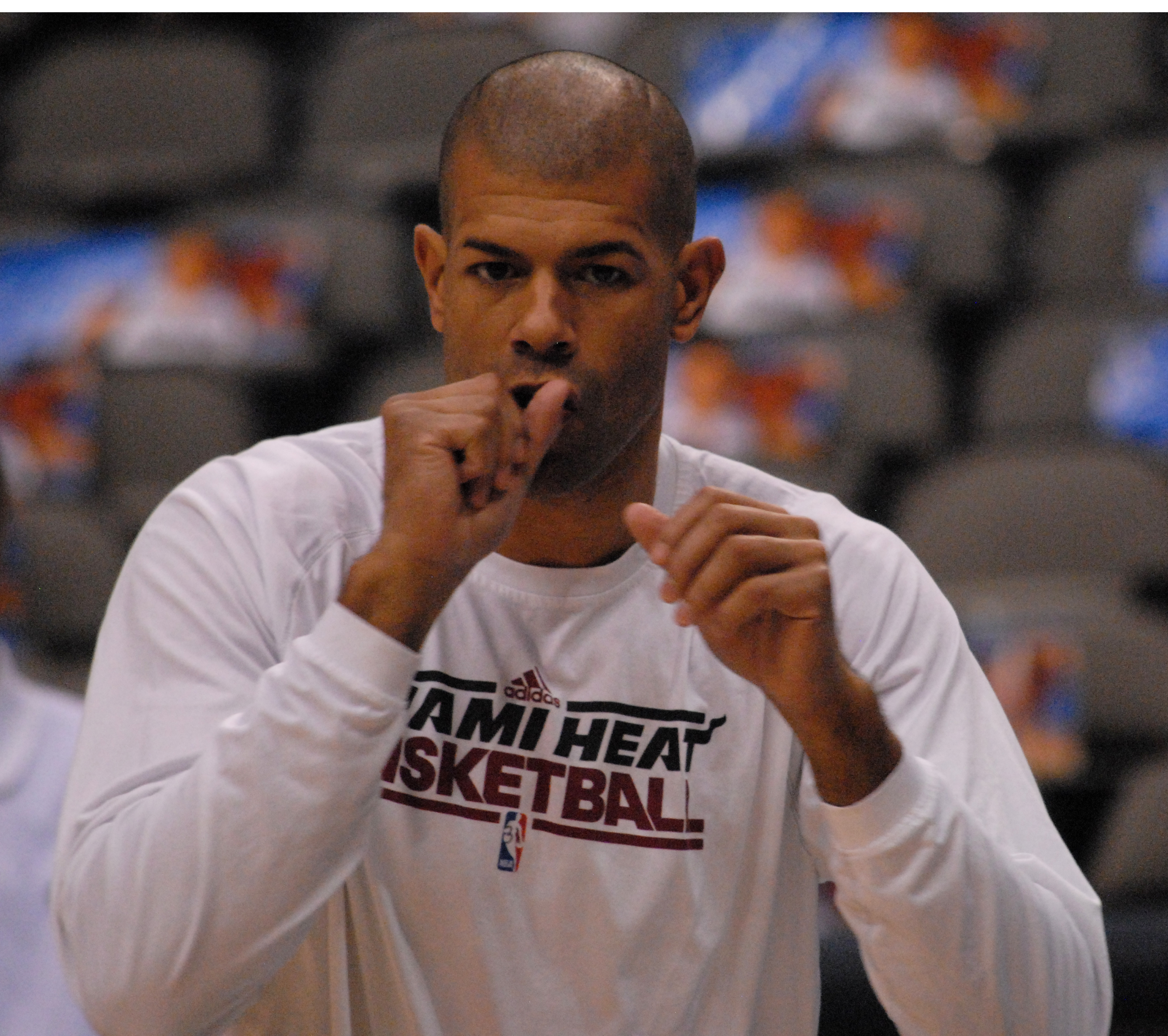
Battier as a member of the Heat in 2012.

Battier signed on as a member of the Heat on December 9, 2011. On March 2, 2012, Battier scored a season-high 18 points, going 6–7 from the three-point line, in a one-point loss to the Utah Jazz. In Game 1 of the Eastern Conference Finals against the Boston Celtics, Battier recorded his first career playoff double-double in a 93–79 win. In the 2012 NBA Finals, Battier scored 58 points in five games, and won his first NBA Championship. His 11.6 points per game exceeded his 4.8 average in the 2011–12 regular season, and he made 15–26 three-point shots. His 57.7 three point shooting percentage in the 2012 NBA Finals is the highest three point shooting percentage ever recorded by a player who made 15 or more three-pointers in an NBA Finals series.

During the 2012–13 regular season, Battier and the Heat won 27 consecutive games, establishing the NBA's second-longest winning streak (behind the 33 consecutive games won by the Lakers in the 1971–72 season). A speech given by Battier following the Super Bowl has been credited with sparking the 27-game win streak. The winning streak was snapped on March 27, 2013, when the Heat lost to the Chicago Bulls. The Heat surpassed the 22-game winning streak recorded by the 2007–08 Rockets, for whom Battier also played. Battier became the only player in NBA history to have been a part of two 20-game winning streaks. Battier struggled with his shooting in the playoffs until scoring 18 points (6 of 8 3-point field goals) in an intense Game 7 against the Spurs to win his second championship. While being awarded the Larry O'Brien Championship Trophy, Battier was asked to speak about his performance, and concisely said that "it's better to be timely than good".

In March 2014, Battier announced his intentions to retire following the 2013–14 season. The Heat went on to their fourth straight NBA Finals, Battier's third, but lost to the Spurs in the 2014 NBA Finals. Battier did not play in Game 2 but did play in the other 4 games of the series. In total for the 2014 Finals, Battier played for 32 minutes and recorded 1 rebound, 1 assist, 1 steal but did not record any points the entire series. Game 5 of that Finals series ended up being Battier's final NBA game ever, as after the Spurs defeated the Heat to win the championship, Battier retired.

== Philanthropy ==
In 2010, Battier and his wife, Heidi Ufer Battier, founded the Battier Take Charge Foundation to help underserved youth through scholarships, mentorship, networking, and leadership training, particularly in Miami; Camden, New Jersey; and Detroit, Michigan. The foundation says that as of 2025, more than 84 percent of Battier Scholars are first-generation college students, and more than 95 percent have completed a bachelor’s degree or higher. The foundation's "Guide" program reports that all participants have enrolled in a post-secondary program following high school graduation. In 2024, the foundation received a $1.4 million grant from the KPMG US Foundation.

== Executive career ==
On February 16, 2017, Battier re-joined the Heat in their front office as the director of basketball development and analytics. On June 18, 2021, it was reported that Battier would be leaving his full-time position but would remain a consultant for the Heat. In 2021, Battier co-founded BOA acquisition Corp with Scott Seligman, minority owner of the San Francisco Giants. BOA's focus was to acquire companies in the property technology area leveraging Battier's technology expertise and Seligman's real estate experience. After a successful listing on the New York Stock Exchange (NYSE: BOAS), the company was acquired in October 2022 by Selina Hospitality PLC, a Generation Z- and Millennial- focused hospitality chain catering to digital nomads.

== Broadcasting career ==
Battier worked as a commentator for ESPN for roughly a year after his retirement before mutually deciding to part ways with the network.

== Personal life ==
In summer 2004, Battier married Heidi Ufer, his high school sweetheart. They had their first son, Zeke Edward Battier, on June 2, 2008. On April 17, 2011, Heidi had their second child, a daughter named Eloise.

Battier is a co-owner of D1 Sports Training in Memphis. In 2010 Battier was chosen as the seventh-smartest athlete in sports by Sporting News. Battier has said that after United States Senator Carl Levin announced his retirement in 2013, the Michigan Democratic Party contacted Battier to gauge his interest in running for the Senate, but he was not interested.

On June 30, 2021, Battier joined the board of directors at Yext.

On December 1, 2021, it was announced that Battier, along with former NBA players Baron Davis and Metta Sandiford-Artest, joined an investing group to launch East Asia Super League.

Battier has been a minority owner of the MLB's Tampa Bay Rays since 2025, as a member of the Patrick Zalupski-led ownership group that purchased the team from Stuart Sternberg.

== NBA career statistics ==
Legend
| GP | Games played | GS | Games started | MPG | Minutes per game |
| FG% | Field goal percentage | 3P% | 3-point field goal percentage | FT% | Free throw percentage |
| RPG | Rebounds per game | APG | Assists per game | SPG | Steals per game |
| BPG | Blocks per game | PPG | Points per game | **Bold** | Career high |
| † | Won an NBA championship | * | Led the league |

=== Regular season ===
| Year | Team | GP | GS | MPG | FG% | 3P% | FT% | RPG | APG | SPG | BPG | PPG |
|---|---|---|---|---|---|---|---|---|---|---|---|---|
| 2001–02 | Memphis | 78 | 78 | **39.7** | .429 | .373 | .700 | **5.4** | **2.8** | **1.6** | 1.0 | **14.4** |
| 2002–03 | Memphis | 78 | 47 | 30.6 | .483 | .398 | .828 | 4.4 | 1.3 | 1.3 | 1.1 | 9.7 |
| 2003–04 | Memphis | 79 | 1 | 24.6 | .446 | .349 | .732 | 3.9 | 1.3 | 1.3 | .7 | 8.5 |
| 2004–05 | Memphis | 80 | 72 | 31.5 | .442 | .395 | .789 | 5.2 | 1.6 | 1.1 | 1.0 | 9.9 |
| 2005–06 | Memphis | 81 | 81 | 35.0 | **.488** | .394 | .707 | 5.3 | 1.7 | 1.1 | **1.4** | 10.1 |
| 2006–07 | Houston | **82*** | **82*** | 36.4 | .446 | .421 | .779 | 4.1 | 2.1 | 1.0 | .7 | 10.1 |
| 2007–08 | Houston | 80 | 78 | 36.3 | .428 | .377 | .743 | 5.1 | 1.9 | 1.0 | 1.1 | 9.3 |
| 2008–09 | Houston | 60 | 59 | 33.9 | .410 | .384 | .821 | 4.8 | 2.3 | .8 | .9 | 7.3 |
| 2009–10 | Houston | 67 | 62 | 32.4 | .398 | .362 | .726 | 4.7 | 2.4 | .8 | 1.1 | 8.0 |
| 2010–11 | Houston | 59 | 59 | 30.8 | .456 | .391 | .645 | 4.8 | 2.6 | .9 | 1.2 | 8.6 |
| 2010–11 | Memphis | 23 | 0 | 24.2 | .426 | .333 | **.882** | 4.0 | 1.4 | .7 | .4 | 5.0 |
| 2011–12† | Miami | 65 | 10 | 23.1 | .387 | .339 | .622 | 2.4 | 1.3 | 1.0 | .5 | 4.8 |
| 2012–13† | Miami | 72 | 20 | 24.8 | .420 | **.430** | .842 | 2.3 | 1.0 | .6 | .8 | 6.6 |
| 2013–14 | Miami | 73 | 56 | 20.1 | .382 | .348 | .652 | 1.9 | .9 | .7 | .5 | 4.1 |
| Career | | 977 | 705 | 30.7 | .437 | .384 | .743 | 4.2 | 1.8 | 1.0 | .9 | 8.6 |

=== Playoffs ===
| Year | Team | GP | GS | MPG | FG% | 3P% | FT% | RPG | APG | SPG | BPG | PPG |
|---|---|---|---|---|---|---|---|---|---|---|---|---|
| 2004 | Memphis | 4 | 0 | 17.3 | .400 | .429 | .667 | 3.0 | .3 | .0 | .3 | 4.8 |
| 2005 | Memphis | 4 | 4 | 29.8 | .419 | .143 | .400 | **6.8** | 1.5 | .5 | **1.0** | 7.3 |
| 2006 | Memphis | 4 | 4 | 32.3 | **.500** | .286 | .333 | 5.8 | .5 | 1.0 | .5 | 6.0 |
| 2007 | Houston | 7 | 7 | 38.9 | .451 | .442 | .875 | 2.6 | 2.1 | **1.7** | **1.0** | **10.3** |
| 2008 | Houston | 6 | 6 | **41.0** | .444 | **.480** | .727 | 3.8 | .5 | 1.0 | .8 | 10.0 |
| 2009 | Houston | 13 | 13 | 38.2 | .407 | .315 | **.957** | 4.9 | **2.4** | 1.1 | .7 | 8.1 |
| 2011 | Memphis | 13 | 0 | 26.1 | .439 | .276 | .667 | 4.0 | 1.2 | .5 | .5 | 5.5 |
| 2012† | Miami | **23** | **16** | 33.4 | .379 | .382 | .813 | 3.2 | 1.2 | 1.0 | .6 | 7.0 |
| 2013† | Miami | 22 | 0 | 17.8 | .290 | .295 | .821 | 1.7 | .5 | .2 | .3 | 4.7 |
| 2014 | Miami | 16 | 6 | 12.6 | .462 | .450 | .800 | .6 | .3 | .3 | .1 | 2.3 |
| Career | | 112 | 56 | 27.1 | .398 | .356 | .778 | 3.0 | 1.0 | .7 | .5 | 6.1 |
