= WHMA-FM =

Radio station in Alexandria, Alabama

- Alexandria, Alabama; United States
- Broadcast area: Anniston-Oxford metropolitan area
- Frequency: 95.3 MHz
- Branding: The Big 95

Programming
- Format: Country
- Affiliations: Fox News Radio

Ownership
- Owner: Williams Communications, Inc.
- Sister stations: WHMA (AM)

History
- First air date: September 1984
- Former call signs: WASZ (1984–2004)
- Former frequencies: 95.3 MHz (1984–1995); 95.5 MHz (1995–2019)
- Call sign meaning: Harry M. Ayers

Technical information
- Licensing authority: FCC
- Facility ID: 52320
- Class: A
- ERP: 400 watts
- HAAT: 332 meters (1,089 ft)
- Transmitter coordinates: 33°37′38.4″N 85°53′24.9″W

Links
- Public license information: Public file; LMS
- Webcast: Listen live

WHMA-FM (95.3 FM, "The Big 95") is a radio station broadcasting a country music format. Licensed to Alexandria, Alabama, United States, it serves the Anniston-Oxford metropolitan area. The station is owned by Williams Communications, Inc.

== History ==
The station was originally applied-for by Perry Communications in 1979, with Ashland, Alabama, as its city of license. Owner Robert Perry was a local entrepreneur, owner of the Perryland Foods grocery businesses in Wedowee and Lineville. After being approved in 1980, it was granted two extensions to the original 18 months before its construction permit expired in 1981. After later being granted a new permit in 1983, it was finally given a license to cover and WSAZ went on the air at 95.3 MHz in mid-September, 1984. During this process, the city of license was changed from Ashland-Lineville, Alabama, to Hobson City. Originally a mix of country and news programming, The station adopted its long-standing all-country format in March 1985. The station moved up by one channel to 95.5 MHz in 1995.

The WHMA-FM calls were originally assigned to the FM sister of AM WHMA, launched in 1947 and owned by Consolidated Publishing, owner of The Anniston Star newspaper, until the mid-1980s. This WHMA-FM, which was a class C 100,000 watt FM, moved from Anniston to metro Atlanta to become WWWQ (now WNNX) on January 15, 2001.

This station gained the WHMA-FM calls in December 2004, and debuted as "The Big 95" on January 15, 2005, on the fourth anniversary of the original station's departure. Under its current ownership, WHMA-FM and the namesake AM station have remained sisters.

WHMA-FM filed an application with the Federal Communications Commission to return to 95.3 MHz and to change its city of license to Alexandria. The station would have the same transmitter location and height, but dropped its power in the maximum direction from 530 watts to 400. A different directional antenna would also be used, shifting the southern end of its coverage area further west. A license to cover with the new facilities was granted in April 2019.
