= Leslie Fram =

American media executive

- Born: Fairhope, Alabama, U.S.
- Education: Studied Speech Communications at University of South Alabama
- Occupations: Senior Vice President of Music Strategy for CMT (U.S. TV channel); philanthropist; spokesperson
- Known for: her work in the 2019 CMT Music Awards (2019), 2012 CMT Music Awards (2012) and Sunday Today with Willie Geist (2016)
- Title: senior VP of music strategy for CMT (U.S. TV channel)

Leslie Fram is an American media executive. A former radio programmer and DJ, she is the senior vice president of music strategy for Country Music Television.

Fram oversees CMT's "Next Women of Country" campaign, which has promoted artists such as Kelsea Ballerini, Maren Morris and Kacey Musgraves, and mentors female executives in the music industry. She is a co-founder of Change the Conversation, a Nashville-based organization which fights gender discrimination and seeks to improve the environment for women in country music.

== Career ==
Fram's first professional job was at WABF in Fairhope, Alabama. She hosted weekend shows including Platter Ladder. Later, Fram went to work at WABB & WABB-FM in Mobile, Alabama, where she rose to the positions of program director and operations manager while hosting an afternoon show.

In 1990, Fram joined Power 99 in Atlanta, working the morning show with Rick Stacy and Tom Clark as "The Breakfast Club". When Power 99 became 99X in 1992, Fram remained in the mornings, eventually co-hosting the Morning X with Steve Barnes and Jimmy Baron. She also served as the station's program director. Fram co-hosted the Toucher, Jimmy, and Leslie Morning Show. After briefly co-hosting mornings with Axel Lowe, Fram became co-host of New Morning X with Sean Demery and Rob Jenners.

In 1998, she became the narrator for the Cartoon Network quasi-documentary series ToonHeads.

Referred to as the "First Lady of Modern Rock", Fram received the 2003 Heroes Award from the Atlanta chapter of the Recording Academy (aka Grammy).

On June 16, 2008, Fram was appointed Program Director at Emmis Communications-owned 101.9 WRXP-FM ("the New York Rock Experience") in New York City. In addition to her duties as Program Director, Fram co-hosted the WRXP show with former MTV/VH1 personality Matt Pinfield. The show was originally broadcast during the morning drive slot from 6 AM to 10 AM but moved to mid-days from 10 AM to 3 PM until WRXP switched formats on July 15, 2011.

Fram is currently the Senior Vice President of Music Strategy at Country Music Television One Country in Nashville.
