= WHMA (AM) =

- Anniston, Alabama; United States
- Frequency: 1390 kHz
- Branding: Mighty Power 1390

Programming
- Format: Gospel
- Affiliations: Fox News Radio

Ownership
- Owner: Williams Communications, Inc.
- Sister stations: WHMA-FM

History
- First air date: November 3, 1938

Technical information
- Facility ID: 6811
- Class: B
- Power: 5,000 watts (day); 1,000 watts (night)
- Transmitter coordinates: 33°42′31.4″N 85°51′13.9″W

WHMA (1390 kHz, "Mighty Power 1390") is a radio station licensed to serve Anniston, Alabama, United States. The station is owned by Williams Communications, Inc.

It broadcasts a gospel music format and features news programming from Fox News Radio.

== History ==
WHMA began broadcasting in Anniston on November 3, 1938. Operating on 1420 kHz with a daytime-only power of 100 watts, it was owned by the Anniston Broadcasting Company. The call letters were for Harry M. Ayers, president of the owning company and publisher of The Anniston Star. In about 1940, the FCC granted permission to operate at 1450 kHz with 250 W day and night. WHMA-FM, 100.5 MHz class C 100 kW, was added in 1947. In 1955, WHMA purchased WSPC, their primary competitor in Anniston, and took over this station's operation at 1390 kHz, 5 kW-D, 1-kW DA-N. The call letters WSPC were first used by a police radio station in Michigan. An agreement was reached to have the letters transferred to the new broadcast station being built in Anniston and owned by Stanton Ingram and Elbert Boozer. WSPC opened in July 1949. These call letters were abandoned after the WHMA purchase.

In March 1984, Anniston Broadcasting Company reached an agreement to sell WHMA to Calhoun Broadcasting Co., Inc. The deal was approved by the FCC on April 26, 1984, and the transaction was consummated on October 5, 1984.

In February 1988, Calhoun Broadcasting Co., Inc., reached an agreement to sell this station to Anniston Radio, Inc. The deal was approved by the FCC on May 18, 1988, and the transaction was consummated on July 11, 1988. In June 1988, control of Anniston Radio passed from Paul C. Stone to Charles A. Giddens. This transfer of control was approved by the FCC on July 14, 1988.

In September 1989, Anniston Radio Inc. reached an agreement to sell this station to Emerald Broadcasting of the South Inc. The deal was approved by the FCC on October 19, 1989, and the transaction was consummated on January 3, 1990. In January 1991, Emerald Broadcasting of the South Inc. merged with Sapphire Broadcasting, Inc. In October 1992, an agreement was reached to transfer control of Sapphire Broadcasting, Inc., from Thomas P. Gannon to Bridge Capital Investors II. This transfer was approved by the FCC on December 8, 1993, and the transaction was consummated on June 1, 1994.

On November 6, 1996, Sapphire Broadcasting, Inc., reached an agreement to sell this station and sister station WHMA-FM (which is now WNNX in College Park, Georgia) to Susquehanna Radio Corporation subsidiary WNNX License Investment Company for $15.05 million. The deal was approved by the FCC on January 27, 1997, and the transaction was consummated on May 22, 1997. In November 1997, WNNX License Investment Company reached an agreement to transfer the broadcast license for WHMA to WNNX LiCo, Inc. The transfer was approved by the FCC on December 10, 1997, and the transaction was consummated the same day.

On April 1, 2002, Susquehanna Radio Corporation (through subsidiary license holder WNNX LiCo, Inc.) reached an agreement to sell this station to Casey Network LLC (a division of Jarrell Communications) for $150,000. The deal was approved by the FCC on May 23, 2002, and the transaction was consummated on June 29, 2002.

In May 2003, Casey Network LLC (Jimmy Jarrell, president/CEO) reached an agreement to sell this station to Williams Communications Inc. (Walton E. Williams Jr., president) for a reported sale price of $275,500. The deal was approved by the FCC on August 12, 2003, and the transaction was consummated on October 9, 2003. At the time of the sale, WHMA aired a news/talk format. Jarrell cited a desire to focus on country music stations as his primary reason for selling WHMA.
