= WNNX =

Classic alternative station in College Park, Georgia

- College Park, Georgia (Note: Originally licensed to Anniston, Alabama; moved to Georgia in 2001.); United States
- Broadcast area: Atlanta metro area
- Frequency: 100.5 MHz (HD Radio)
- Branding: 99X

Programming
- Format: Alternative rock

Ownership
- Owner: Cumulus Media; (Radio License Holding SRC LLC)
- Sister stations: WKHX-FM; WWWQ

History
- First air date: 1947
- Former call signs: WHMA-FM (1947–2001); WWWQ (2001–08)
- Call sign meaning: "Ninety-Nine X"

Technical information
- Licensing authority: FCC
- Facility ID: 6809
- Class: C2
- ERP: 13,500 watts
- HAAT: 298 meters (978 ft)
- Transmitter coordinates: 33.760°N 84.389°W

Links
- Public license information: Public file; LMS
- Webcast: Listen live
- Website: 99xatl.com

WNNX (100.5 FM) is a commercial radio station licensed to College Park, Georgia, featuring an Alternative rock format as "99X". Owned by Cumulus Media, the station serves the Atlanta metropolitan area. WNNX's studios are located in Sandy Springs, while the transmitter resides atop the Westin Peachtree Plaza Hotel in Downtown Atlanta. In addition to a standard analog transmission, WNNX is available online.

== History ==
=== Moving from Alabama ===
The 100.5 frequency has been in metro Atlanta, licensed to College Park, since early 2001. Before then, the station was licensed to Anniston, Alabama, as WHMA-FM. It started out as a simulcast of WHMA (1400 AM). WHMA-AM-FM were network affiliates of ABC. In the 1970s, WHMA-FM began airing its own country music format as "Alabama 100". (After the move, that call sign shifted to another existing station in Alabama, becoming 95.3 WHMA-FM "The Big 95" in Alexandria.)

Interested in moving the station to the more lucrative Atlanta radio market, owner Robert Gammon proposed that WHMA-FM be re-licensed to Sandy Springs. It would remain at 100,000 watts effective radiated power (ERP) as a Class C station. An agreement had already been made with the nearest co-channel station, WSSL-FM in upstate South Carolina for it to move its transmitter a bit further from Atlanta. However that station was sold to Clear Channel Communications in the interim and the agreement was negated. Additionally, the Federal Communications Commission (FCC) ruled that Sandy Springs was "not a community", citing its unincorporated status and letters of support from local organizations in Sandy Springs that had "Atlanta" as their addresses. At that time, Sandy Springs was part of unincorporated Fulton County, before it became an incorporated city in 2006.

After exhausting his funds in pursuit of the reallocation, Gammon sold WHMA-FM to Susquehanna Radio. In a revised application before the FCC, Susquehanna proposed a different city of license, College Park. The FCC approved the application, mostly because the new application downgraded the class of the station from C (up to 100 kW at 600 meters or 1,968 feet) to C3 (up to 25 kW at 100 meters or 328 feet) to protect the licensed broadcast range of WSSL-FM. Susquehanna was also forced to slightly null the station's signal away from the direction of WSSL-FM, to stay in compliance with spacing rules. When it went on the air in Atlanta, the station had an effective radiated power of 3,000 watts, using the Turner Broadcasting tower, which gave it a height above average terrain (HAAT) of less than 1,000 feet.

The move created spectrum space for two new radio stations in Alabama, but forced two low-power stations off the air: Southern Polytechnic State University low-power station WGHR and Georgia Public Broadcasting FM translator W264AE, both on 100.7 MHz.

=== Q100 (2001–2008) ===
The first format for 100.5 FM in Atlanta was Top 40 station WWWQ ("Q100"), which made its debut on January 23, 2001. It was the first mainstream Top 40 outlet in Atlanta since WAPW flipped to alternative as WNNX in October 1992, as well as a brief stint on WBTS when it debuted in 1999. Despite its 3,000 watt signal, Q100 often received higher Arbitron listenership ratings than several of its 100,000-watt competitors, including sister station 99X.

Susquehanna continued to pursue a larger signal for the station, eventually earning approval from the FCC to go from Class C3 to Class C2. The upgrade occurred on October 24, 2005, at 5:00 PM, when the station moved from the Turner Broadcasting tower to the Westin Peachtree Plaza Hotel. WWWQ was now powered at 12,500 watts, using a tower that better covered the Atlanta market. In 2006, Cumulus Media acquired Susquehanna, including both 99X and Q100.

=== Rock 100.5 (2008–2022) ===
"Rock 100.5" logo (2008–2019)

On January 11, 2008, Cumulus announced that Q100 would move to the 100,000-watt signal at 99.7 MHz, replacing "99X", on January 25. The transition began on January 21, when WWWQ's "The Bert Show" was simulcast on both stations. (99X's morning show was cancelled the week before.) 99X signed off on 99.7 FM/HD1 and moved to 99.7-HD2, with Q100 moving to 99.7 FM/HD1, at 5:30 a.m. on January 25. On the same day, at 6 a.m., 100.5 began stunting, first with Beyoncé Knowles singing "To the Left" (from her song "Irreplaceable") and morning show host Bert Weiss redirecting listeners to the new frequency. At 10 a.m., the stunting then switched to a loop where eight different formats were presented, with listeners having the option to call the station and vote on which was their favorite. On January 28, 2008, at 5:45 a.m., The Regular Guys announced the debut of "Rock 100.5", carrying a radio format similar to their previous station WKLS (formerly "96 Rock"), which itself changed formats to active rock as "Project 9-6-1". Rock 100.5's first song was "Baba O' Riley" by The Who. WWWQ and WNNX swapped call signs the following day.

In 2010, WNNX became the FM flagship radio station of the Atlanta Braves for that season through 2013, along with WCNN, which continues carrying the team's games to this day. The rights were moved to then-sister station WYAY starting with the 2014 season. After WYAY was sold to the Educational Media Foundation in 2019, WNNX resumed carrying Braves broadcasts. In 2022, WNNX once again dropped their Braves affiliation.

Throughout the station's existence, WNNX has shifted among different genres of rock. When "Rock 100.5" first launched, the station aired a predominantly album-oriented rock format. In April 2009, the station began leaning towards adult album alternative. In 2010, the station shifted back to its broad-based AOR format, which lasted until late 2011, when the station shifted towards classic rock. Ratings for the station at that time were shaky, as the station usually pulled between a 1.5 and 2 share.

WNNX returned to a mainstream rock direction in 2012, following the flips of WKLS from active rock to Top 40/CHR and WZGC from adult album alternative to sports in the Fall of that year.

==== Merger with "98-9 The Bone" ====
On January 28, 2013, WNNX and sister station W255CJ ("98-9 The Bone") began promoting changes to the two stations on their Facebook and Twitter pages, promoting a "bigger and better change" to come starting February 1. There were rumors that Cumulus' Atlanta management was planning a merger of the two formats on one frequency, presumably on 100.5.

The official change took place on that Friday, February 1, at Midnight, when 98.9 and 100.5 began simulcasting. At 10 AM, the official relaunch took place, as WNNX shifted to active rock. The first song after the relaunch was "Chalk Outline" by Three Days Grace. The simulcast lasted until February 4 at Noon, when 98.9 flipped to a new format, Christian country, under the name "The Walk".

==== "Atlanta's Classic Rock" ====
After broadcasting an active rock format for barely a year, the station shifted back to classic rock on January 3, 2014, now competing with Cox Media Group's WSRV. WNNX's playlist was similar to what it was in 2012, prior to its shift to active rock.

==== "Atlanta's Rock Station" ====
The station's next format adjustment began in mid-2016 with a slogan tweak to "Atlanta's Rock Station". No personnel changes were made, and the music was slightly updated to focusing more on chart topping rock hits between the 1980s, 1990s, and recurrent releases, including the grunge era of rock played more. This format direction helped increase the station's ratings. On August 30, 2019, WNNX shifted back to an active rock lean in their mainstream rock format.

=== 99X (2022–present) ===
On December 1, 2022, WNNX dropped Elliot in the Morning after eight months. The next day, at 5 p.m., after playing "Enter Sandman" by Metallica, WNNX dropped the rock format and began stunting with a loop of "Bitter Sweet Symphony" by The Verve, with sweepers stating "It's coming, same as it ever was. Monday morning, 6 a.m." The stunt was an allusion to the anniversary of a stunt pulled by former 99X DJ Sean Demery in October 1997, when he garnered local attention after playing the song in a similar loop shortly after its release.

At the promised time, WNNX flipped to classic alternative as "99X", marking the return of the 99X brand to a full powered signal for the first time since 2008. The first song on the revived "99X" was "Video Killed the Radio Star" by The Buggles, the same song that had launched the original incarnation 30 years prior. The re-launch came a few months after Cumulus launched an interactive online museum to honor the 30th anniversary of 99X. A letter on the station's website and Twitter page declared that the station's full-staffed launch had been set for January 3, 2023, effectively making the interim period a soft launch of the format; while there had been no official confirmation from Cumulus or the station at the time of launch, Cumulus hired several original station staffers for the station's new incarnation, including Steve Barnes, Leslie Fram, Steve Craig, Will Pendarvis, Jill, and Matt 'Organic' Jones.

In August 2026, Cumulus dismissed all of the airstaff except Pendarvis as part of nation-wide layoffs. Some air shifts are now voice-tracked by DJs in other markets. At the same time, the station shifted to an Alternative rock format by adding current music, while still playing some classic alternative tracks.
