= Matt Pinfield =

American media personality (born 1961)

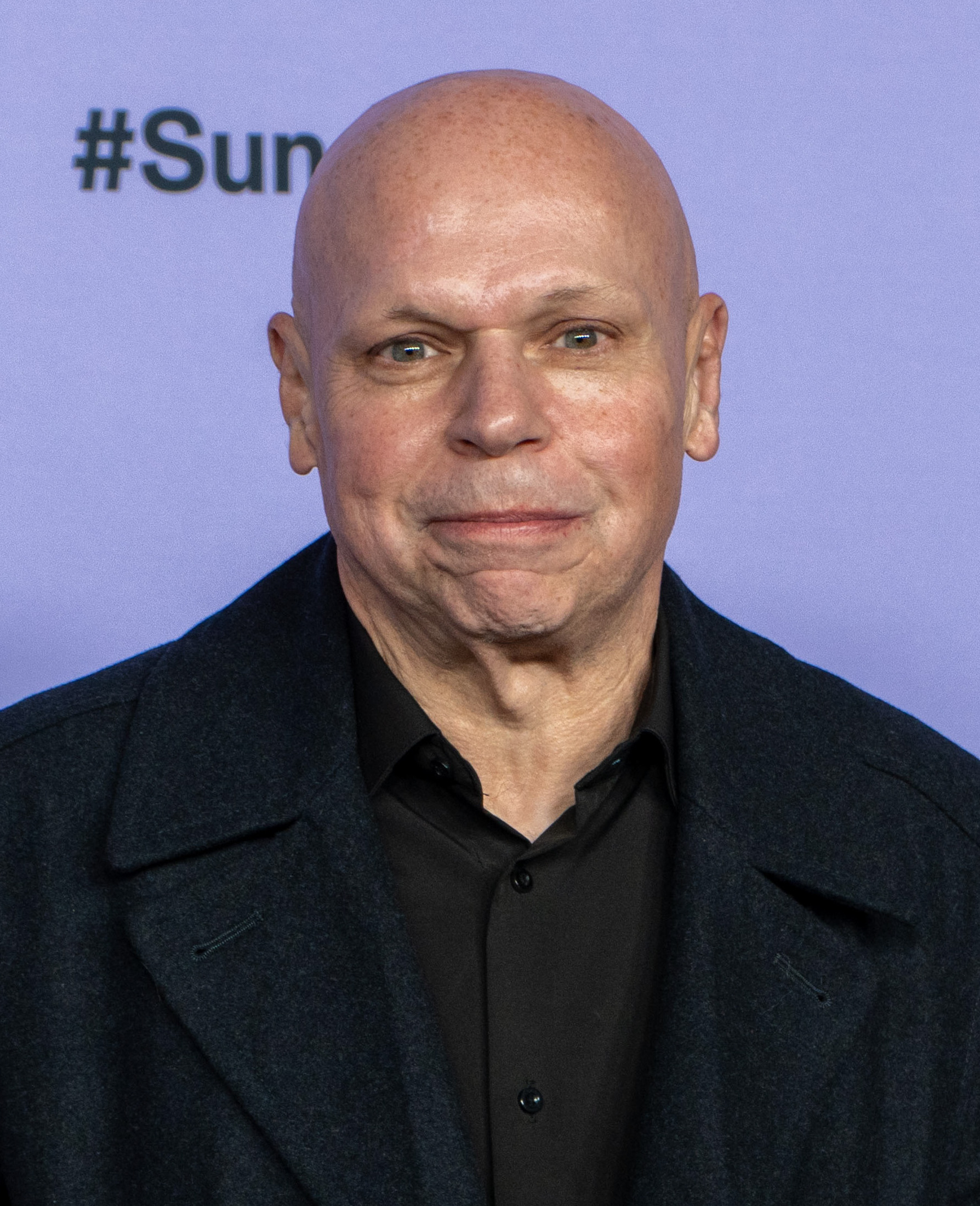
- Pinfield in 2024
- Born: May 28, 1961 (age 65); Athens, Georgia, U.S.
- Education: Rutgers University
- Occupations: VJ, TV personality/host
- Years active: 1984–present
- Website: mattpinfieldmusic.com

Matthew Pinfield (born May 28, 1961) is an American television host, disc jockey, and music executive. He first reached national prominence as a VJ on MTV. He served two stints as the host of the alternative music program 120 Minutes, from 1995 to 1999 on MTV and from 2011 to 2013 on MTV2.

Starting in the early 1980s, he began working as both a radio and club DJ in the New Jersey alternative rock scene, working at WHTG-FM when the station first began broadcasting alternative rock in 1984. He later became music director at the station and won several awards before MTV hired him to host their long-running late-night alternative music show in 1995. Pinfield went on to host a number of other shows on the MTV family of networks, including MTV, MTV2, and VH1. He left MTV in 1999 to host Farmclub.com, a live music show that aired on the USA Network. He served as vice president of A&R and artist development for Columbia Records from 2001 to 2006. He has since worked as a DJ and television host for a number of terrestrial and satellite radio stations and television networks.

== Career ==
=== Early years ===
Early in his career, Pinfield worked as an on-air host and music director at WRSU-FM, the official radio station of Rutgers University. During that time, he appeared in documentary Rockin’ Brunswick, directed by Paul Devlin. In 1984, he became a radio DJ on the Jersey Shore alternative rock radio station WHTG-FM 106.3, and was the main DJ at a New Brunswick, New Jersey club called The Melody Bar. During his tenure, the Melody became a respected alternative music club in the New York City area. Pinfield developed a close personal relationship with a number of British alternative rock bands such as Ned's Atomic Dustbin, Pop Will Eat Itself, and The Wonder Stuff.

During his 10 years at WHTG, Pinfield was the recipient of the Gavin Award (1992 and 1993) for National Commercial Alternative Music Director of the Year.

In 1992, Pinfield appeared in an episode of the first season of MTV's The Real World when he interviewed members of the rock group Reigndance on-air at WHTG. The group's lead singer, Andre, was one of the seven cast members of The Real World.

In 1995, Pinfield began his television career hosting MTV's 120 Minutes. Within a year, he hosted a variety of MTV shows including MattRock, Pinfield Suite, Pinfield Presents, Rocks Off, Say What?, MTV Live, and over 100 MTV specials. His music knowledge was showcased on TRL's Stump Matt. In 1999, Pinfield joined Universal Television to host and co-write a live television show about music, farmclub.com, which aired in 2000 on the USA Network.

In 2001, Pinfield became Vice President of A & R and Artist Development for Columbia Records, signing and overseeing the making of albums by acts including Coheed & Cambria and Crossfade. During the same time, he hosted WXRK's The Buzz and made cameo appearances on several albums, including a secret spoken word track on Limp Bizkit's Significant Other. In 2005, Pinfield was asked by The Rolling Stones to host their international radio interview for Premiere networks. The special featured all four band members together for the first time in an interview setting in over 35 years.

In 2006, Pinfield returned to television to host VH1's VSpot Top 20 Countdown and HDNet's Sound Off with Matt Pinfield, an in-depth interview program in the vein of Larry King Live. Pinfield also co-starred as himself on several episodes of the Nickelodeon program The Naked Brothers Band.

On August 22, 2007, Pinfield hosted Projekt Revolution, a free concert hosted on Myspace.com. Pinfield hosted Sirius Satellite Radio's Matt Pinfield Plays Whatever He Wants and Soundoff with Matt Pinfield. However, as of November 12, 2008, the merger of XM and Sirius left the future of these shows in doubt. The future of these shows remains in doubt to this day.

Beginning May 28, 2008 Pinfield took over as morning drive DJ on New York radio station WRXP 101.9FM.

In July 2009, Pinfield worked the counter at Jack White's Third Man Records pop-up store, which operated for two days on Chrystie Street in New York City. The store's primary function was to promote two WRXP gigs that White's band, the Dead Weather, was doing at Terminal 5.

Every February, Pinfield spins 80s/90s alternative classics at the now annual Melody Bar Reunion in New Brunswick, New Jersey.

In July 2011, WRXP changed formats and Pinfield left the station to host 120 Minutes, which had been revived by MTV2. He began hosting the revived weekly series on July 31, 2011.

In January, 2012, Pinfield was chosen to host Flashback, the classic rock weekend show on 219 radio stations owned by Cumulus Media.

Pinfield played himself in an episode of Portlandia on January 4, 2013.

=== 2015–present ===
In 2015, Pinfield became a DJ on SiriusXM Radio's Lithium channel from 7 am to 1 pm (ET) weekdays.

On Wednesday, April 20, 2016, Pinfield took over the morning DJ timeslot at Cumulus Media's San Francisco outpost, KFOG 104.5.

In 2016, Pinfield published a memoir, All These Things That I've Done: My Insane, Improbable Rock Life.

In 2018, Pinfield penned the foreword for the book 100 Things Pearl Jam Fans Should Know & Do Before They Die, by author Greg Prato.

In September 2019, Pinfield covered the Rock in Rio festival for LiveXLive interviewing artists on the backstage.

In January 2021, Pinfield began hosting New & Approved, a Sunday evening program featuring new rock music, on 95.5 FM KLOS in Los Angeles.

Matt Pinfield was honored at the Global Rock Summit 2022 event with the first International Rock Icon of the Year Award for his contributions to music, radio, and media.

Pinfield was the interviewer for Season 1 of the reality competition show No Cover that aired in April 2022.

On March 28, 2024, Pinfield was introduced on-air as the new afternoon drivetime host for KCSN, a AAA-format public radio station based in Los Angeles.

== Personal life ==
He lives in Los Angeles, California, and previously resided in Harrison, New Jersey and East Brunswick Township.

On December 3, 2018, Pinfield nearly died while crossing the street near his Hollywood home. He was struck by a car that was going 40 miles per hour (64 km/h); Pinfield broke his leg in two places and split his head open all the way to the skull after hitting the windshield headfirst and striking his head a second time on the pavement.

Pinfield suffered a stroke on January 6, 2025. It was later reported on January 30 that he was left "incapable of moving or making cognitive decisions", and his daughters applied for a temporary conservatorship in light of his condition. However, after recovery, Pinfield returned to hosting Flashback in mid-June 2025.

== In popular culture ==
The Killers' song "All These Things That I've Done" from their 2004 album Hot Fuss is about Pinfield. He met the band while working as a vice president of A&R at Columbia Records.
