= WZGC =

Sports radio station in Atlanta

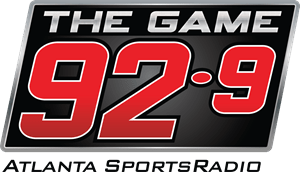
- Atlanta, Georgia; United States
- Broadcast area: Metro Atlanta
- Frequency: 92.9 MHz (HD Radio)
- Branding: 92-9 The Game

Programming
- Language: English
- Format: Sports radio
- Subchannels: HD2: The Bet (Sports gambling)
- Affiliations: Atlanta Falcons; Atlanta Hawks; Atlanta United FC; Westwood One Sports

Ownership
- Owner: Audacy, Inc.; (Audacy License, LLC)
- Sister stations: WAOK; WSTR; WVEE

History
- First air date: September 1, 1955
- Former call signs: WGKA-FM (1955–1972)
- Call sign meaning: former owner General Cinema

Technical information
- Licensing authority: FCC
- Facility ID: 13805
- Class: C1
- ERP: 66,000 watts
- HAAT: 340 meters (1,120 ft)
- Transmitter coordinates: 33°48′26″N 84°20′22″W

Links
- Public license information: Public file; LMS
- Webcast: Listen live (via Audacy); Listen live (via iHeartRadio); HD2: Listen live (via Audacy); HD2: Listen live (via iHeartRadio)
- Website: audacy.com/929thegame

WZGC (92.9 FM) – branded 92-9 The Game – is a commercial sports radio station licensed to serve Atlanta, Georgia, covering the Metro Atlanta. Owned by Audacy, Inc., WZGC is the Atlanta affiliate for Westwood One Sports; the flagship station for the Atlanta Falcons, Atlanta Hawks and Atlanta United FC radio networks; and the radio home of Randy McMichael. The WZGC studios are located at Colony Square in Midtown Atlanta, while the station transmitter is located in Atlanta's North Druid Hills neighborhood. In addition to a standard analog transmission, WZGC broadcasts over one HD Radio channel, and is available online via Audacy.

== History ==
=== Classical (1955–1971) ===
The station signed on the air on September 1, 1955, as WGKA-FM. Owned by Glenkaren Associates, it was the FM counterpart of WGKA (1190 AM), with studios at 1140 Peachtree Street NE. WGKA-FM was the first full-time FM classical music station in Atlanta.

=== Rock (1971–1973) ===
In 1971, the General Cinema Corporation acquired WGKA-AM-FM. Even though it was a movie theater chain, GCC wanted to branch out into broadcast media. The classical music remained on the AM station, while the FM station became WZGC (referring to the last two letters in General Cinema) in 1972, with an album-oriented rock format.

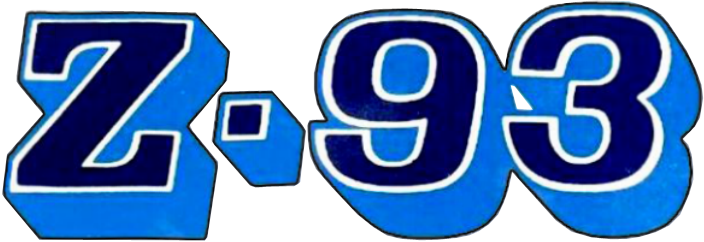
Old logo Used by WZGC under the z93 era.

=== Top 40 (1973–1989) ===
In March 1973, the format switched to contemporary hit radio calling itself "Z-93".

In the 1970s, many radios still only received AM signals. WQXI and WGST (920 AM) were the leading top 40 stations in Atlanta, but as FM listening increased, WZGC gained an audience. The station was acquired by First Media Corporation in 1976.

In the 1980s, the AM top 40 stations switched to other formats, leaving WZGC as Atlanta's only contemporary hits station. Then, in 1986, WAPW (99.7 FM) debuted with its own popular top 40 format, with WZGC's ratings declining as a result. The station switched to a rhythmic contemporary format during the summer of 1988.

=== Classic rock (1989–2004) ===
On January 3, 1989, that station changed to a classic rock format, while retaining the "Z-93" moniker. Infinity Broadcasting acquired WZGC in 1992; Infinity was renamed CBS Radio in December 2005.

Former logo

=== AAA (2004–2012) ===
The name change to "Dave FM" and format switch to adult album alternative (AAA) came at 5 pm on July 21, 2004, following a stunt featuring all-Dave Matthews Band music. Dave's first song was "Orange Crush" by Athens, Georgia-based group R.E.M. WZGC installed an HD Radio transmitter in the early 2000s. The HD-2 subchannel carried an Americana format branded as "Dave Roots".

=== Sports talk (2012–present) ===
Throughout its run as "Dave FM", the station maintained decent ratings, though it was never an overall winner. However, in the summer of 2011, the station saw a drop in its Arbitron ratings. At the same time, CBS had enjoyed success with several of its FM stations that had switched to all sports formats in Dallas, Boston, Detroit and Pittsburgh. Due to this, CBS announced in July 2012 that WZGC would flip to all sports in October. Dave's final day of programming, which started on September 29, after a three-day radiothon for Children's Healthcare of Atlanta, consisted of the on-air staff hosting final shifts (including Steve Craig, Jill, Mara Davis, Charles, Yvonne Monet, Sully, Renee and Margot), as well as a "Top 92 Songs of Dave FM" countdown. Around 12:20 am on September 30, Dave FM ended regular programming with "Little Lion Man" by Mumford & Sons (the #1 song in the countdown) and "Atlanta" by Butch Walker. The station ran on automation until the flip at 2 pm on October 24. The final song on "Dave" was "Thank You Friends" by Big Star.

Even though WZGC was owned by CBS Radio, it didn't affiliate with CBS Sports Radio at launch, as the network already had an affiliate in Atlanta on WCNN. Because of this, WZGC had local sports hosts around the clock, all week long. Eventually, WCNN became an ESPN Radio affiliate, and WZGC added CBS Sports Radio programming to its overnight schedule.

On February 2, 2017, CBS Radio announced it would merge with Entercom. The merger was approved on November 9, 2017, and was consummated on November 17.

On February 23, 2022, WZGC added The Bet to its HD2 subchannel.

== Former DJs ==
- Elvis Duran – hosted with sidekick "Hot Henrietta" during the late '80s.
- Jimmy Baron
- Steve Barnes – host of All Access
- The Greaseman (syndicated show)
- Steve McCoy
- Shadoe Stevens
