= Jimmy Baron =

American disc jockey on commercial radio

- Born: November 13, 1961 (age 64); Chicago, Illinois, U.S.
- Occupation: Disc jockey
- Website: www.jimmybaron.com

Jimmy Baron (born November 13, 1961) is an American disc jockey on commercial radio. He has also acted in several TV shows and movies from 1980 to 1985. Films include Risky Business, The Sure Thing, and Heart Like a Wheel. Television work includes Facts Of Life, Quincy, M.E., Hart to Hart, and M*A*S*H. He also appeared as a contestant on Scrabble in 1989.

Baron was born in Chicago, Illinois. He began his radio career in Oxnard, California in 1990 at KZTR FM as half of the Mac and Jimmy Morning Show, along with Jeff McMurray. In August of that year he moved to San Diego to produce the Stevens & Grdnic Morning Show on Y95. In March 1991 he went cross-town to produce the Dawn Patrol with Dave Rickards, Shelly Dunn, and Cookie "Chainsaw" Randolph on KGB-FM. He left in August 1992 to move back to Chicago, producing the legendary Jonathon Brandmeier Showgram on WLUP-FM.

He joined 99X in Atlanta in 1993 as part of the morning show with Leslie Fram and Sean Demery, eventually named The Morning X. Baron stayed with the morning show through its various changes: The Morning X with Barnes, Leslie and Jimmy; The Don Miller Morning Show; The Toucher, Jimmy, and Leslie Morning Show; and Mornings with Axel, Jimmy, and Leslie. While with The Morning X from 1993 to 2003, the show won numerous national and local awards from industry and media. At one point The Morning X was one of the highest-rated morning shows on American alternative radio. Baron exited 99X in early April 2006 when he and new owners Cumulus Broadcasting could not agree on terms to a new deal. He officially announced his departure from 99X on Friday April 28.

Baron also did some work with World Championship Wrestling during its heyday in the late 1990s, serving as a "road reporter," providing recorded "scoop" info, and co-hosting a monthly pay-per-view broadcast with Chad Damiani on DirecTV called Backstage Blast.

From August 17, 2009 to November 10, 2011, Baron co-hosted mornings with Yvonne Monet on Dave FM (WZGC Atlanta, GA). He has found minor successes in Hollywood selling two TV projects that are currently in development, one to CBS and one to Endemol USA.

Baron began "reconnecting" with his Jewish heritage around 1998. He observes Shabbat and keeps kosher.

In 2011, Baron left radio and launched a career in residential real estate. In 2013 he joined Keller Williams Realty First Atlanta where he is consistently one of the top performers.
