= Fred Toettcher =

American radio broadcaster

- Born: January 16, 1975 (age 51); Detroit, Michigan, U.S.
- Other name: Fred Toucher
- Education: Rollins College
- Occupation: Sports talk radio host
- Known for: The Toucher and Hardy Show
- Awards: Marconi Award (2016)

Fred Toettcher (born January 16, 1975), also known as Fred Toucher, is an American radio personality with a sports radio talk show on WBZ-FM in Boston. Toettcher is the co-host of Toucher and Hardy with Rob "Hardy" Poole. He previously co-hosted The Toucher and Rich Show with Rich Shertenlieb from 2006 to 2023, winning a Marconi Award as Major Market Personality of the Year in 2016. Their 17-year partnership ended in November 2023 when Shertenlieb left the program.

== Career ==
A native of Detroit, Toettcher graduated from Rollins College in 1997. After graduating, he landed a job at a small radio station in Cumming, Georgia. In 1999, he started hosting nights on 99X in Atlanta and eventually worked his way to the morning show. In 2006, after leaving his show in Atlanta he and Rich Shertenlieb started The Toucher and Rich Show together on WBCN in Boston. In 2009, the show moved to 98.5 The Sports Hub. While initially thought to be moved to the station as a fill-in while the station tried to assemble a more sports-oriented program, The Toucher and Rich Show quickly rose to prominence and is considered to be one of the most popular radio shows in New England. In the 2018 fall Nielsen Audio ratings for Boston, the show took first place in the morning drive category with a 10.5 share.

Though not necessarily considered a shock jock, Toettcher has been involved in a few controversies. In May 2005, he prodded a caller to tell listeners the ending to the recently released movie Harry Potter and the Half-Blood Prince. In April 2010, he referred to overtly Christian quarterback Tim Tebow's NFL Draft party as "resembling a lily-white Nazi gathering". In October 2013, he hung up on Rick Pitino. In 2019, Toucher hung up on Carolina reporter Chip Alexander, claiming that he "just can't listen to a guy with a southern accent talk hockey."

Toettcher occasionally feuded with John Dennis of former rival morning show Dennis and Callahan, who often called him a hipster and referred to Toettcher as "Fred Douchebag." Toettcher usually responded by mocking Dennis's age and noting that The Toucher and Rich Show consistently beat Dennis and Callahan in Boston radio market ratings, usually by a substantial margin.

In May 2023, Toettcher admitted himself to a detoxification facility, saying "I was voluntarily locking myself up so I wouldn't drink anymore, so I knew I wouldn't drink. That's how I felt like, I was like, all right, I've lost control, I've lost control of alcohol, I've lost control, I'm not thinking like me, I need to make sure that I'm in a position where I do not have the opportunity to drink. Was it fun? It was the worst five days of my entire life." His departure from the show followed an earlier 2023 absence due to the temporary loss of his voice. Toettcher had previously left the show for an extended period of time in 2020 for alcohol addiction rehabilitation.

Toettcher announced Shertenlieb's departure from The Toucher and Rich Show on November 10, 2023. Toettcher said that Shertenlieb did not inform him of his departure and that he learned of the change from the station's management while he was driving home after the previous day's show. In the November 10 show's opening segment, Toettcher discussed problems that had developed between him Shertenlieb: "Earlier this year, Rich said some stuff on and off the air about me I didn't like. So I texted him some things that I had been holding on to from the course of our relationship that he did not like." Toettcher then described a prolonged period of estrangement that followed. During the announcement, Toettcher said that the show would continue under its current name until January 2024 when a new co-host would be named.
