= Jonni =

Jonni is a given name. Notable people with the name include:

- Jonni Cabrera (born 1989), Paraguayan footballer
- Jonni Cheatwood, American visual artist
- Jonni Darkko, American pornographic actor
- Jonni Fulcher (born 1974), Scottish-Swiss billiards player
- Jonni Hansen, Danish Nazi politician
- Jonni Lightfoot, bassist in the Australian band Air Supply
- Jonni Myyrä (1892-1955), Finnish athlete
- Jonni Peräaho, Finnish footballer

Fictional characters

- Jonni Future, a comic book heroine
- Jonni Thunder, a superheroine, a rebooted variant of Johnny Thunder

== See also ==
- Cesare Jonni, Italian football referee
- John (given name)
- Johnie
- Johnn
- Johnny (given name)
- Johny (disambiguation)
- Jonathan (name)
- Joni (disambiguation)
- Jonie
- Jonn
- Jonnie
- Jony
