= Johnie =

Johnie is a masculine given name. Notable people with the name include:

- Johnie Berntsson (born 1972), Swedish sport sailor
- Johnie Cock, protagonist of the eponymous Scottish folk ballad
- Johnie Cooks (born 1958), American football player
- Johnie Hammond (born 1932), American politician in Iowa
- Johnie Scot, protagonist of the eponymous English/Scottish ballad
- Johnie Watson (1896–1958), American baseball outfielder

== See also ==
- John (given name)
- Johnn
- Johnny (given name)
- Johny (disambiguation)
- Jonathan (name)
- Joni (disambiguation)
- Jonie
- Jonn
- Jonni
- Jonnie
- Jony
