= Jonny =

- Gender: Masculine
- Language: English language

Origin
- Language: English language
- Origin: 1. Jonathan; 2. Jon; 3. Jonas/Jonah

Other names
- Variant forms: Johnny, Jonnie

Jonny is a masculine given name, and pet name, in the English language. A pet form of Jon, the natural diminutive of given name Jonathan, in some cases it can also mean a condom. A variant form of Jonny is Jonnie.

== People with the name ==
=== A–G ===
- Jonny Adam (born 1984), British racing driver
- Jonny Addis (born 1992), Northern Irish footballer
- Jonny Allan (born 1983), English footballer
- Jonny Andersson (born 1964), Swedish International motorcycle trials rider
- Jonny Arr (born 1988), English rugby union player
- Jonny Arriba (born 2001), Spanish footballer
- Jonny Bairstow (born 1989), English cricketer
- Jonny Bell (rugby union) (born 1974), Ireland international rugby union player
- Jonny Bentley (born 1986), New Zealand rugby union player
- Jonny Blair (born 1992), Scottish film director and screenwriter
- Jonny Blu, American singer
- Jonny Brain (born 1983), English footballer
- Jonny Brodzinski (born 1993), American ice hockey player
- Jonny Brown (cyclist) (born 1997), American cyclist
- Jonny Browning, American instrumental surf musician
- Jonny Brownlee (born 1990), English triathlete
- Jonny Buckland (born 1977), British guitarist
- Jonny Burn (born 1995), English footballer
- Jonny Campbell (soccer) (born 1991), American soccer player
- Jonny Cato (born 1994), Swedish politician
- Jonny Chingas (1940-1992), Mexican American musician
- Jonny Chops (born 1986), American drummer
- Jonny Clarke (born 1992), English actor
- Jonny Clayton (born 1974), Welsh darts player
- Jonny Cocker (born 1986), British racing driver
- Jonny Coffer (born 1989), English songwriter and record producer
- Jonny Cooper (born 1989), Irish Gaelic footballer
- Jonny Coyne (born 1958), Cypriot-British actor
- Jonny Craig (born 1986), American-Canadian singer
- Jonny Cruz (born 1982), American actor
- Jonny Danielson (born 1964), Swedish long-distance runner
- Jonny DeLuca (born 1998), American baseball player
- Jonny Diaz (born 1984), American singer-songwriter
- Jonny Dickson (born 2001), British slalom canoeist
- Jonny Dixon (born 1984), English footballer and film producer
- Jonny Dodge (born 1982), British entrepreneur
- Jonny Dollar (1964–2009), Record producer and songwriter
- Jonny Donahoe (born 1983), British comedian, writer and performer
- Jonny Dymond (born 1970), British journalist
- Jonny Edgar (born 2004), British racing driver
- Jonny Evans (born 1988), Northern Irish footballer
- Jonny Evans (ice hockey) (born 1997), Canadian ice hockey player
- Jonny Fa'amatuainu (born 1983), Samoan rugby player
- Jonny Fair, American jazz musician
- Jonny Fairplay (born 1974), American professional wrestler and television personality
- Jonny Fines (born 1987), English actor, singer and dancer
- Jonny Finstad (born 1966), Norwegian politician
- Jonny Flynn (born 1989), American basketball player
- Jonny Forsström (1944–2017), Swedish painter
- Jonny "Itch" Fox, English rapper
- Jonny Freeman, British actor and comedian
- Jonny Fritz, American singer-songwriter
- Jonny Gale (born 1994), English cricketer
- Jonny Godsmark (born 1989), English footballer
- Jonny Gomes (born 1980), American baseball player
- Jonny Gooch (born 1994), Welsh field hockey player
- Jonny Gould (born 1953), British radio and TV presenter
- Jonny Gray (born 1994), Scotland international rugby union player
- Jonny Gray (actor) (born 1999), Canadian actor
- Jonny Greenwood (born 1971), English musician
- Jonny Guadarrama (born 1999), American soccer player

=== H–O ===
- Jonny Halberg (born 1962), Norwegian author and dramatist
- Jonny Hansen (footballer) (born 1981), Norwegian footballer
- Jonny Hanssen (footballer) (born 1972), Norwegian footballer
- Jonny Hardy (1934–2017), Israeli footballer
- Jonny Harkness (born 1985), Northern Ireland footballer
- Jonny Harris (born 1975), Canadian actor & comedian
- Jonny Harris (rugby union) (born 1991), English rugby union player
- Jonny Hayes (born 1987), Irish footballer
- Jonny Hector (born 1964), Swedish chess grandmaster
- Jonny Hepworth (born 1982), English rugby union & league footballer
- Jonny Hey (born 1949), German footballer
- Jonny Heykens (1884–1945), Dutch composer
- Jonny Hill (rugby union) (born 1994), England international rugby union player
- Jonny Hill (singer) (born 1940), Austrian singer
- Jonny Holmström (born 1968), Swedish professor
- Jonny Hovde, Norwegian handball player
- Jonny Howson (born 1988), English footballer and coach
- Jonny Hughes (born 1985), English cricketer
- Jonny Hurst (born 1966), English chant laureate
- Jonny Jakobsen (born 1963), Danish-Swedish musician
- Jonny Johansson, Swedish fashion director
- Jonny Kane (born 1973), British racing driver
- Jonny Kaplan, American singer songwriter
- Jonny Kennedy (1966–2003), British sufferer of epidermolysis bullosa dystrophica
- Jonny Kim (born 1984), American astronaut, physician, and former U.S. Navy SEAL
- Jonny King (born 1965), American jazz musician
- Jonny L (born 1970), British drum and bass producer
- Jonny Labey (born 1993), British actor
- Jonny Lake, Canadian chef
- Jonny Lang (born 1981), American singer, songwriter
- Jonny Lattimer, British songwriter
- Jonny Lindfors (born 1975), Swedish army general
- Jonny Löhr (1899–1967), German politician
- Jonny Lomax (born 1990), Great Britain and England international rugby league footballer
- Jonny Maddison (born 1994), English footballer
- Jonny Magallón (born 1981), Mexican footballer
- Jonny Makeup (born 1984), American rapper
- Jonny Malbon (born 1974), French offshore sailor and navigator
- Jonny Margetts (born 1993), English footballer
- Jonny Martinez (born 1969), American singer
- Jonny Maudling, British musician
- Jonny Maxted (born 1993), English footballer
- Jonny May (born 1990), England international rugby union player
- Jonny McGovern (born 1976), American singer-songwriter
- Jonny McPherson (born 1982), English actor
- Jonny Mendoza (born 1983), Venezuelan boxer
- Jonny Miller (born 1949), American sportscaster
- Jonny Lee Miller (born 1972), British actor
- Jonny Moseley (born 1975), American freestyle skier
- Jonny Moser (1925–2011), Austrian historian
- Jonny Mosquera (born 1991), Colombian footballer
- Jonny Murphy (born 1992), Irish rugby union player
- Jonny Murray (born 1974), Canadian ice hockey official
- Jonny Ngandu (born 2001), English footballer
- Jonny Nilsson (1943–2022), Swedish speed skater
- Jonny O'Mara (born 1995), British tennis player
- Jonny Oates, Baron Oates (born 1969), British Liberal Democrat politician
- Jonny Otten (born 1961), German footballer
- Jonny Otto (born 1994), Spanish footballer
- Jonny Owen (born 1971), Welsh actor, producer

=== P–Z ===
- Jonny Pasvolsky (born 1972), Australian actor
- Jonny Pelham (born 1990), British comedian and writer
- Jonny Perriam (born 1994), Scottish rugby union referee
- Jonny Persey, British film producer
- Jonny Phillips (actor) (born 1963), English actor
- Jonny Phillips (musician) (born 1971), English jazz guitarist and composer
- Jonny Podell, American talent agent
- Jonny Polonsky (born 1973), American musician
- Jonny Porkpie (born 1974), American burlesque writer, director, and performer
- Jonny Pownall (born 1991), English rugby league footballer
- Jonny Pula, Motswana comedian and actor
- Jonny Quinn (born 1972), Northern Irish musician
- Jonny Ragga (born 1977), Ethiopian reggae singer
- Jonny Rees, HK rugby union player
- Jonny Reid (born 1983), New Zealand racing driver
- Jonny Reinhardt (born 1968), German shot putter
- Jonny Rödlund (born 1971), Swedish footballer
- Jonny Ross (born 1973), Northern Irish bowler
- Jonny Rowell (born 1989), English footballer
- Jonny Russell (born 2004), Northern Irish footballer
- Jonny Sánchez (born 1987), Venezuelan boxer
- Jonny Saunders (born 1975), British radio sports reporter
- Jonny Searle (born 1969), British rower
- Jonny Shipes, American music entrepreneur and producer
- Jonny Sinaga (born 1961), Indonesian diplomat
- Jonny Singfield (born 1969), British rower
- Jonny Smith (footballer) (born 1997), English footballer
- Jonny Smith (journalist) (born 1979), Automotive journalist
- Jonny Star (born 1964), German artist
- Jonny Staub (born 1979), Canadian radio & TV personality
- Jonny Steele (born 1986), Northern Irish footballer
- Jonny Steinberg (born 1970), South African writer and scholar
- Jonny Stewart (born 1990), Scottish footballer
- Jonny Storm (born 1977), British professional wrestler
- Jonny Stuttle (born 2005), English footballer
- Jonny Sun, Canadian author and illustrator
- Jonny Sweet (born 1985), British comedian
- Jonny Tata (born 1992), New Zealand darts player
- Jonny Tattersall (born 1994), English cricketer
- Jonny Trunk, British writer, broadcaster and DJ
- Jonny Uchuari (born 1994), Ecuadorian footballer
- Jonny Vaughan (born 2004), English rugby league footballer
- Jonny Vaughton (born 1982), Welsh rugby union player
- Jonny Venters (born 1985), American baseball player
- Jonny Garza Villa, American author of queer literature
- Jonny Walker (soccer) (born 1974), American soccer player
- Jonny Walker (rugby league) (born 1988), English rugby league footballer
- Jonny Walker (boxer) (1819-1888), English lightweight bare-knuckle boxer
- Jonny Walker (motorcyclist) (born 1991), British motorcycle racer
- Jonny van Wanrooy, Dutch mixed martial arts fighter
- Jonny Weimann (born 2006), English rugby union player
- Jonny Weston (born 1988), American actor
- Jonny Wickersham (born 1967), American musician
- Jonny Wilkinson (born 1979), British Lions & England international rugby union player
- Jonny Williams (born 1993), Wales international footballer
- Jonny Yerrell (born 1985), English rapper
- Jonny Yull (born 2005), Australian soccer player
- Jonny Z, American rapper and hip-hop producer

== Fictional characters ==
- Jonny, an Ed, Edd n Eddy character
- The title character of Jonny Quest
- Jonny Keogh, one of the main characters in the BBC sitcom Two Pints of Lager and a Packet of Crisps

== See also ==
- Johnny, given name
- Jonnie, given name
