= Jonn =

Jonn is a masculine given name. Notable people with the name include:

- Jonn Hart, American singer
- Jonn Penney (born 1968), English musician
- Jonn Reinhart (Damien Demento), a ring name of an American wrestler
- Jonn Savannah (Don Snow), British vocalist and multi-instrumentalist
- Jonn Serrie, American composer
- Young Jonn, Nigerian singer, songwriter and producer

Surname

- Erika Jonn (1865–1931), Swedish artist
- Kihnu Jõnn (Enn Uuetoa, 1848–1913), Estonian ship captain
- Lina Jonn (1861–1896), Swedish photographer
- Maria Jonn (1855–1910), Swedish photographer and businesswoman

Fictional characters

- Martian Manhunter (J'onn J'onzz), DC Comics character

== See also ==
- John (given name)
- Johnie
- Johnn
- Johnny (given name)
- Johny (disambiguation)
- Jonathan (name)
- Joni (disambiguation)
- Jonie
- Jonni
- Jonnie
- Jony
