= Jonnie =

Jonnie is a unisex given name. It is a variant form of Jonny.

== Men ==
- Jonnie Barnett (1946–2002), American musician
- Jonnie Boer (1965–2025), Dutch chef
- Jonnie Craig (born 1988), English photographer
- Jonnie Efraimsson (born 1958), Swedish football player
- Jonnie Fedel (born 1966), Swedish football coach
- Jonnie Irwin (1973–2024), English television presenter
- Jonnie Juice (born 1984), New Zealand professional wrestler
- Jonnie Kuper, Melanesian bishop
- Jonnie Peacock (born 1993), British Paralympic runner

== Women ==
- Jonnie Allen, American singer
- Jonnie Jonckowski (born 1954), American bull rider
- Jonnie Newman (born 2006), Canadian artistic swimmer
- Jonnie Nicely (1936–2013), American model

== See also ==
- John (given name)
- Johnny (given name)
- Johny (disambiguation)
- Jonathan (name)
- Joni (disambiguation)
- Jonie
- Jonn
- Jonni
- Jony
