= Jermaine Wiggins =

American football player (born 1975)

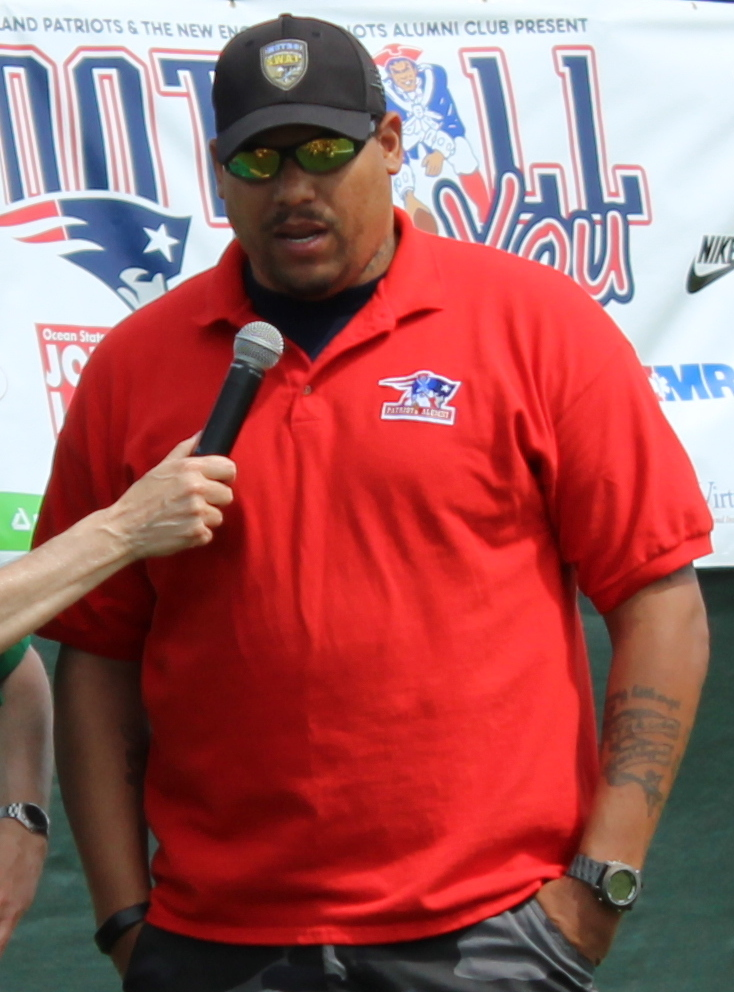
- Wiggins in 2014

No. 84, 85
- Position: Tight end

Personal information
- Born: January 18, 1975 (age 51); Brooklyn, New York, U.S.
- Listed height: 6 ft 2 in (1.88 m)
- Listed weight: 272 lb (123 kg)

Career information
- High school: East Boston (Boston, Massachusetts)
- College: Marshall (1994–1995); Georgia (1996–1998)
- NFL draft: 1999: undrafted

Career history
- New York Jets (1999–2000); New England Patriots (2000–2001); Indianapolis Colts (2002); Carolina Panthers (2002–2003); Minnesota Vikings (2004–2006); Jacksonville Jaguars (2007)*; Florida Tuskers (2009–2010)
- * Offseason or practice squad member only

Awards and highlights
- Super Bowl champion (XXXVI)

Career NFL statistics
- Receptions: 236
- Receiving yards: 2,141
- Receiving touchdowns: 16
- Stats at Pro Football Reference

Jermaine Wiggins (born January 18, 1975) is an American former professional football player who was a tight end in the National Football League (NFL). He played college football for the Georgia Bulldogs, and signed with the New York Jets as an undrafted free agent in 1999.

Wiggins was also a member of the NFL's New England Patriots, Indianapolis Colts, Carolina Panthers, Minnesota Vikings, and Jacksonville Jaguars. He won a Super Bowl ring with the Patriots in Super Bowl XXXVI over the St. Louis Rams. He also played for the Florida Tuskers of the United Football League.

== Early life ==
Wiggins attended East Boston High School in the East Boston neighborhood of Boston, Massachusetts and was a letterman in football and basketball. In football, he was an All-City and an All-League honoree. In basketball, he helped lead his team to the state championship as a junior. Wiggins graduated from East Boston in 1993. After high school, he attended Bridgton Academy in North Bridgton, Maine for a year of post-graduate study. In 2011, East Boston High School honored Wiggins by retiring his jersey.

== College career ==
Wiggins attended Marshall University for two years before transferring to the University of Georgia. He led Marshall in receptions in 1995 with 54 catches for 681 yards (11.1 yards per catch) and scored four touchdowns in helping Marshall to the finals of the I-AA Championship, falling to Montana 22–20. He also played as a freshman in 1994 (5 catches, 56 yards and 1 touchdown - 11.2), when Marshall advanced to the I-AA semifinals, losing at Boise State, 28–24, and winning its first outright Southern Conference championship (second of three SC titles for the Thundering Herd). When MU head coach Jim Donnan took the Georgia coaching job, Wiggins and teammate Olandis Gary transferred to the Bulldogs, sitting out in 1996 and playing in the SEC in 1997 and 1998, winning bowl games both years with UGA.

== Professional career ==
=== New York Jets ===
Wiggins went undrafted in the 1999 NFL draft and signed with the New York Jets as an undrafted free agent. He only played for the Jets for part of 2000, but he did play a part in the Monday Night Miracle against the Miami Dolphins. The Jets were losing 30–7 going into the 4th quarter when they began an improbable comeback. Wiggins caught a touchdown pass from Vinny Testaverde to make the score 30–20. The Jets would eventually win in overtime 40–37. Later in the season he was released and signed with the New England Patriots.

=== New England Patriots ===
Wiggins played in New England for two seasons (2000–2001). While in New England he won Super Bowl XXXVI in 2001. After a quiet 2001 regular season in which he only caught 14 passes, Wiggins became a key part of the Patriots air attack in the playoffs. Wiggins is perhaps best known by Patriots fans for his 10 catch, 68 yard performance in the Patriots AFC Divisional Round overtime victory against the Raiders. He also caught a seven-yard pass in the Patriots final Super Bowl drive that enabled the field goal kick to win the game. He also became famous for wearing red cleats.

=== Indianapolis Colts ===
Wiggins then played part of one season for the Indianapolis Colts in 2002.

=== Carolina Panthers ===
Wiggins signed with the Carolina Panthers during the 2002 season and played with the team through the 2003 season, winning an NFC Championship in 2003.

=== Minnesota Vikings ===
Wiggins signed with the Minnesota Vikings, spending three seasons with the team (2004–2006), before being released on March 1, 2007. Minnesota is also where Wiggins was known to be a part of the Love Boat Scandal.

=== Jacksonville Jaguars ===
Wiggins was signed by the Jacksonville Jaguars in March 2007. He was released on August 27 after suffering a concussion from a helmet-to-helmet hit by Green Bay Packers safety Aaron Rouse in a preseason game.

=== Florida Tuskers ===
After spending two seasons out of football, Wiggins was drafted by the Florida Tuskers in the UFL premiere season draft in 2009. He signed with the team on August 17.

== After football ==
Wiggins has ventured into sports media upon retiring from football. In 2010, Wiggins obtained various positions in Boston sports media outlets such as CSN New England, WBZ, and WHDH. Until August 13, 2014, he frequently appeared on 98.5 The Sports Hub alongside Michael Felger and Tony Massarotti. Though he is primarily utilized as an NFL analyst, he also covers other Boston sports news. Wiggins appeared on A&E's Flipping Boston, the "Flip or Fumble" episode which features Wiggins joining hosts Pete and Dave on the renovation project of a home. Wiggins also formerly co-hosted a morning show on a local Boston hip hop radio station HOT 96.9. He currently is a co-host on the Greg Hill Morning Show and makes sporadic appearances on the Gresh and Fauria mid-day show on sports radio WEEI in Boston; he also has his own podcast.

Wiggins was featured in the documentary Killer Inside: The Mind of Aaron Hernandez.

On April 13, 2023, Wiggins was named the head coach of the Brockton Boxers high school football team.
