= NBC Sports Boston =

Sports television network in Boston, U.S.

- Country: United States
- Broadcast area: Massachusetts; Eastern and Central Connecticut; Vermont; Maine; New Hampshire; Rhode Island; National (via satellite)
- Network: NBC Sports Regional Networks
- Headquarters: Needham, Massachusetts, U.S.

Programming
- Language: English
- Picture format: 1080i HDTV (downscaled to letterboxed 480i for the SDTV feed)

Ownership
- Owner: NBC Sports Group (80%); Boston Celtics (20%)
- Sister channels: New England Cable News; WNEU; WBTS-CD

History
- Launched: November 6, 1981
- Former names: PRISM New England (1981–1983); SportsChannel New England (1983–1998); Fox Sports New England (1998–1999); Fox Sports Net New England (1999–2004); FSN New England (2004–2007); Comcast SportsNet New England (2007–2017)

Links
- Website: nbcsports.com/boston

Availability

Streaming media
- Peacock: peacocktv.com (U.S. internet subscribers in eligible area only; requires add-on to subscription to access content)
- DirecTV Stream: Internet Protocol television
- YouTubeTV: Internet Protocol television
- Hulu Live: Internet Protocol television
- FuboTV: Internet Protocol television

NBC Sports Boston is an American regional sports network owned by the NBC Sports Group unit of NBCUniversal, and operates as an affiliate of NBC Sports Regional Networks. The channel broadcasts regional coverage of professional sports events throughout New England with a major focus on Boston area teams, as well as several original analysis, magazine and entertainment programs. It is available on cable providers throughout Massachusetts, eastern and central Connecticut, Vermont, Maine, New Hampshire and Rhode Island; it is also available nationwide on satellite via DirecTV.

NBC Sports Boston, along with NBC owned and operated NBC10 Boston (WBTS-CD channel 15), Telemundo O&O WNEU (channel 60), and New England Cable News (NECN), are all based at the NBCU Boston Media Center on B Street in Needham.

== History ==
=== Early history ===
NBC Sports Boston originally launched on November 6, 1981, as PRISM New England. A spin-off of the Philadelphia-based film and sports-oriented premium service PRISM, it was founded by that channel's parent company, Spectacor. Along with carrying entertainment programming, the network also served as the cable television home for the NHL's Hartford Whalers and the NBA's Boston Celtics, as well as various college sports teams.

In late 1982, Spectacor sold PRISM New England to Cablevision Systems Corporation. On January 1, 1983, the network was rebranded as SportsChannel New England, becoming the second network of what would become the SportsChannel group (after SportsChannel New York). In addition, to the Celtics and Whalers, Cablevision added select New York area sports telecasts to the network which were produced by SportsChannel New York.

=== As a Fox Sports Net outlet ===
On June 30, 1997, News Corporation and Liberty Media – which had created a new group of regional sports networks, branded as Fox Sports Net, in November 1996, through News Corporation's partial acquisition of the Liberty-owned Prime Network – purchased a 40% interest in Cablevision's sports properties including the SportsChannel networks (as part of a deal that included partial ownership of Madison Square Garden and its NBA and NHL team tenants, the New York Knicks and New York Rangers). Cablevision, News Corporation and Liberty Media formed the venture National Sports Partners to run the owned-and-operated regional networks.

As part of a gradual rebranding of most of the SportsChannel networks that began that month (the lone exception being SportsChannel Florida, which did not become an owned-and-operated outlet until 2000), SportsChannel New England officially rebranding as Fox Sports New England on January 28, 1998. That month, MediaOne acquired a 50% interest in the network. However, despite the new name, it did not become an FSN affiliate at that time. The competing New England Sports Network had been an affiliate of FSN since it launched and still had two years left in its affiliation agreement, blocking Fox Sports New England from actually carrying any FSN programming. While Fox had hoped to negotiate an early termination of this agreement, this did not happen. Instead Fox Sports New England did not become an FSN affiliate until January 1, 2000. Later that year, the channel was rebranded as Fox Sports Net New England, as part of a collective brand modification of the FSN networks under the "Fox Sports Net" banner. That year, AT&T Corp. bought MediaOne, including its stake in the network; in January 2001, AT&T proposed to sell the stake, along with its interest in seven other cable networks, in a filing with the Federal Communications Commission. Comcast acquired the stake in November 2002 as part of its merger with AT&T Broadband.

The network's name was shortened to FSN New England in 2004, through the de-emphasis of the "Fox Sports Net" brand by the regional networks. In later years, the network carried selected New York Mets games in parts of Connecticut that were not served by MSG or FSN New York (now MSG Plus), which then produced the games.

=== As a Comcast SportsNet outlet ===
In February 2005, Cablevision acquired News Corporation's interest in FSN New England, FSN New York, and FSN Chicago in a trade deal in which Fox sold its interest in Madison Square Garden and the arena's NBA and NHL team tenants in exchange for acquiring sole ownership of FSN Florida, FSN Ohio, and FSN's national programming and advertising division. Comcast retained its 50% stake in FSN New England, at the time, analysts speculated that Comcast would eventually acquire full control of the network for integration into its Comcast SportsNet group of regional sports networks.

CSN New England logo, used from 2016 to October 1, 2017

On April 30, 2007, Comcast announced that it would purchase Cablevision's stakes in FSN New England and FSN Bay Area from Cablevision, giving it full ownership of FSN New England. The network was rebranded as Comcast SportsNet New England on October 1, 2007. CSN New England, along with the other Comcast SportsNet-branded networks, was revamped with a new logo and graphics package (similar to that first used by sister network Comcast SportsNet Bay Area after it dropped the FSN brand) in August 2008.

With Comcast's acquisition of NBCUniversal in 2011, Comcast SportsNet was also integrated into the new NBC Sports Group, culminating with the addition of the peacock logo and an updated graphics package to mirror that of its parent network. That year, the network reached an extension of their rights deal with the Boston Celtics that saw the team acquire a 20% equity stake in Comcast SportsNet New England. On August 6, 2014, satellite provider Dish Network dropped Comcast SportsNet New England in a dispute over a proposed increase in retransmission consent fees during carriage agreement negotiations.

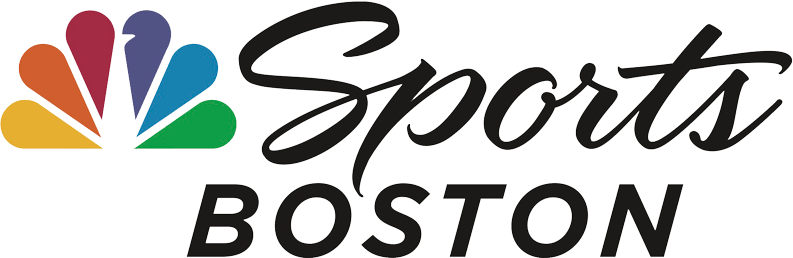
Logo of NBC Sports Boston used from October 2, 2017 until 2023

Comcast rebranded the network as NBC Sports Boston on October 2, 2017, as part of a larger rebranding of the Comcast SportsNet networks under the NBC Sports brand.

== Programming ==
=== Sports coverage ===
NBC Sports Boston holds the regional cable television rights to the NBA's Boston Celtics (the only remaining sports property that has aired its games on the network since its launch in 1981), the WNBA's Connecticut Sun, until the team's relocation to Houston, the New England Free Jacks of the Major League Rugby, the Boston Cannons of Major League Lacrosse and the Maine Celtics of the NBA G League (which have aired its games on the network since the team's formation in 2011).

Until 2012, Comcast SportsNet New England also carried programming distributed nationally by Fox Sports Networks in lieu of a regional FSN affiliate. This includes access to a variety of college sports, notably Pac-12 Conference basketball games on various nights, as well as Saturday telecasts of football games from the Pac-12 and Big 12 Conferences during their respective seasons. The channel also aired studio shows produced by Fox Sports Networks (such as The Best Damn Sports Show Period and FSN Final Score), prior to the premiere of the network's own sports news program, SportsNet Central, in December 2009. Comcast SportsNet New England, along with four other CSN networks, dropped FSN programming on August 1, 2012, after the NBC Sports Group could not reach a deal to continue carrying FSN programming.

The network formerly carried games from the NHL's Hartford Whalers from its launch in 1981 until the team's relocation to North Carolina (as the Carolina Hurricanes) in 1997. The network also served as the television home of the Boston Breakers of the United States Football League, broadcasting the team's games that were not nationally televised by ABC or ESPN for one season in 1983. The network also carried select Hartford Wolf Pack games from 1997 to 2006.

The network formerly aired games for the New England Revolution first in the 2000s and became its exclusive television provider in 2010 until the pandemic shortened 2020 season when the Revolution moved its broadcasts in Boston on both CBS Affiliate WBZ-TV on select games and MyNetworkTV Affiliate WSBK-TV on most games. For people in Rhode Island they were offered by the MyNetworkTV subchannel of WPRI-TV. As of 2023, there is no local broadcast outside of WFXT's national FOX games since Apple TV assumed global MLS rights.

=== Current and former original programming ===
- New England Revolution games 2010–2020
- The Baseball Show (airs Sundays from 6:30 p.m. to 8:00 p.m. during baseball season) – Hosted by Bob Neumeier with analysts Lou Merloni, Sean McAdam, Dan Shaughnessy, and Steve Buckley, it is a call-in program featuring studio discussions, and opinions and comments from viewers and listeners about the latest issues regarding the Boston Red Sox. Original host Michael Felger left the program after committing to WBZ-FM (98.5) in August 2009 as the show was simulcast on WBZ competitor WEEI (850 AM) through 2010; it currently airs solely on NBC Sports Boston. A special edition of the program, The Basketball Show, airs whenever the Boston Celtics are playing in the NBA Finals.
- Celtics Now – Hosted by Michael Holley, a weekly studio show reviewing news involving the Boston Celtics from the previous week.
- Cross Check (Tuesday nights during hockey season) – Hosted by Michael Felger and Mike Milbury, the show discusses all of the week's latest news on the Boston Bruins. Joe Haggerty and Bruins fourth line winger Shawn Thornton make weekly appearances. The show's signature segment is called "Fan or Fraud,” an on-the-street trivia segment in which Bruins fans around the Boston area are asked questions about the team to determine if they are a true fan.
- Early Edition (weeknights at 6:00 p.m.) – Hosted by Gary Tanguay, Trenni Kusnierek and Michael Felger, Early Edition combines hot takes and opinion, offering an unfiltered look at the best Boston sports topics of the day.
- Boston Sports Tonight (weeknights at 9:00 p.m.) – Michael Holley, Tom Giles and Danielle Trotta meet fans at the cross-section of opinion, information and fun. The unique format provides immediate, real-time reactions to what's happening throughout the Boston sports world.
- Best of Boston Sports Tonight (airs at various timeslots during weekdays and Saturdays) – Recap of the Best Moments from the network's nightly sports show centered on opinion, information and fun.
- Sports Sunday (Sundays at 7:30 p.m.) – Sports Sunday, a studio show hosted by Michael Felger, reviews the previous week in New England Sports. Panelists include Lou Merloni, Bob Ryan, Ron Borges, Michael Holley, Chris Gasper, Sean McAdam, Cedric Maxwell, Damon Amendolara, Tom E. Curran, Troy Brown, Ty Law and Kevin Paul Dupont. The program's "conference call" call-in segment features writers from across the United States discussing the national sports scene.
- The Toucher and Rich Show (weekdays from 6:00 a.m. to 10:00 a.m.) – A simulcast of the weekday morning drive radio program from WBZ-FM, hosted by Fred Toucher and Rich Shertenlieb.
- Felger and Mazz (weekdays from 2:00 p.m. to 6:00 p.m.) – Debuting on November 14, 2011, it is a simulcast of the afternoon drive program from WBZ-FM, hosted by Michael Felger and Tony Massarotti, with Jim Murray providing the day's headlines every 30 minutes. Former Patriots' tight end Jermaine Wiggins co-hosted the program on Tuesdays from 2:00 p.m. to 4:00 p.m. as part of a segment called "Wiggy Tuesday" until August 2014. Contributors include Boston Globe sportswriter Chris Gasper (who appears in-studio on Fridays and during the football season), Paul Perillo (who discusses the New England Patriots on Thursdays), Greg Bedard on Tuesdays (who appears during football season) and Bruins president Cam Neely (who appears weekly during hockey season).
- New England Tailgate (Thursdays at 8:00 p.m. during football season) – Hosted by Gary Tanguay with Fred Smerlas and Steve DeOssie as analysts, it is a weekly studio show featuring discussion and analysis on the New England Patriots.
- Patriots Football Weekly (Thursdays at 7:30 p.m. during football season) – Hosted by writers/editors of the New England Patriots official newspaper, Patriots Football Weekly: Fred Kirsch, Andy Hart and Paul Perillo.
- Quick Slants (Thursdays at 7:00 p.m. during football season) – An interactive football show that airs hosted by Tom E. Curran, answering questions about current events in the NFL via Twitter, Facebook, and live chat.

== Notable on-air staff ==
=== Current on-air staff ===
- DJ Bean – Boston Sports Tonight Friday host
- Bob Beers – hockey analyst (2009–present)
- Marc Bertrand – Zolak and Bertrand
- Drew Carter – Celtics play-by-play announcer (2023–present)
- Matt Cassel – Patriots studio analyst
- Abby Chin – Celtics pregame and postgame as well as court-side reporter
- Tom E. Curran – Patriots insider
- Michael Felger – Former host of Arbella Early Edition and Co-Host of Felger and Mazz and Boston Sports Tonight Felger and Holly
- Chris Forsberg – Celtics insider
- Tom Giles – anchor and reporter
- Michael Holley – Boston Sports Tonight host (2008–present)
- Eddie House – Celtics studio analyst
- Trenni Casey – anchor and reporter
- Chris Mannix – Celtics studio analyst
- Tony Massarotti – co-host of Felger and Mazz
- Lou Merloni – baseball analyst and fill-in UNO Sun Sports Tonight host (2009–present)
- Phil Perry - Patriots anchor/reporter
- Brian Scalabrine – Celtics commentator and analyst (2012–2013, 2014–present)
- John Tomase – Red Sox reporter and analyst
- Tim Welsh – Celtics studio analyst
- Scott Zolak – Zolak and Bertrand

=== Former on-air staff ===
- Kay Adams – co-host, Quick Slants
- Dale Arnold – Sports Net Central (2008–2011)
- Upton Bell – Boston Breakers studio host (1983)
- Don Blackburn – Hartford Whalers color commentator (1983–1986)
- A. Sherrod Blakely - Celtics analyst
- Troy Brown – football analyst
- Gerry Cheevers – Hartford Whalers color commentator (1986–1995)
- Larry Collmus – Racing From Suffolk Downs co-host
- Bob Cousy – Boston Celtics color commentator (1999–2008)
- Dalen Cuff – Sports Net Central Anchor & Reporter
- Greg Dickerson – Boston Celtics courtside reporter (2006–2013), studio host (2001–2006)
- Kyle Draper – Celtics studio host (2013–2020) and "Sports Sunday" host (2017–2020)
- Evan Drellich – Red Sox reporter and analyst, co-host of The Baseball Show (2017–2019)
- Brad Feldman – New England Revolution play-by-play announcer
- Mike Fornes – Hartford Whalers play-by-play (1981–1984)
- John Forslund – Hartford Whalers play-by-play (1995–1997)
- Naoko Funayama – New England Revolution reporter
- Bill Gardner – Hartford Whalers color commentator (1996–1997)
- Mike Giardi – Sports Net Central anchor/reporter (2009-2018)
- Mike Gorman – Celtics play-by-play announcer (1982–2024) Connecticut Sun play-by-play announcer (2010–2011)
- Joe Haggerty – Bruins analyst
- Tommy Heinsohn – Boston Celtics color commentator for Celtics games (1982–2020)
- André Lacroix – Hartford Whalers color commentator (1982–1983)
- Bob Lobel – Boston Celtics studio host (1989–1993)
- Mike Lynch – Boston Celtics studio host (1993–1994)
- Paul Mariner – New England Revolution color commentator
- Donny Marshall – Boston Celtics studio analyst, and color commentator for select Celtics' road games (2005–2013)
- Carolyn Manno – Sports Net Central anchor/reporter (2009–2012)
- Willie Maye – Boston Celtics courtside reporter (1996–2005), studio host (1994–1996)
- Sean McAdam – NBC Sports Boston baseball staff writer (2009-2016)
- Johnny McKenzie – Hartford Whalers color commentator (1981–1982)
- Jessica Moran – Anchor and reporter (2009–2016, currently a news/sports reporter at WMUR)
- Bob Neumeier – SportsNet Central anchor/reporter (2010–2016) co-host The Baseball Show
- Harvey Pack – Racing From Suffolk Downs co-host
- Rick Peckham – Hartford Whalers play-by-play (1984–1995)
- Daryl Reaugh – Hartford Whalers color commentator (1995–1996)
- Leah Secondo – Boston Celtics studio host (1997–1998)
- Kayce Smith – Boston Sports Tonight co-host (2017–2018)
- Gary Tanguay – Early Edition co-host
- Danielle Trotta - Boston Sports Tonight co-host (2018–2020)
- Kim Walden – Boston Celtics studio host (1996–1997)
- Nicole Zaloumis – SportsNet Central anchor/reporter (2009–2012)

== Other services ==
=== NBC Sports Boston HD ===
NBC Sports Boston HD is a high definition simulcast feed of NBC Sports Boston, which transmits in the 1080i resolution format. The simulcast feed broadcasts live Boston Celtics games, studio shows and original programming in high definition.
