= Felger & Mazz =

Sports radio and television show

Felger & Massarotti
- Other names: Felger & Mazz
- Genre: Sports Talk
- Running time: ~ 4 hours (2:00 pm – 6:00 pm); These times may vary based on holidays, Bruins start times, or Celtics start times.
- Country of origin: United States
- Home station: WBZ-FM
- TV adaptations: NBC Sports Boston
- Starring: Michael Felger; Tony Massarotti; Jim Murray
- Produced by: Kevin Maggiore
- Executive producer: James “Jimmy” Stewart
- Recording studio: Waltham, MA
- Other studios: Banners Restaurant; Encore Boston Harbor; Hurricanes at the Garden; The Greatest Bar; Radio Row; Plainridge Park Casino; F1 Arcade Boston
- Original release: August 13, 2009 – Present
- Opening theme: Glorified G by Pearl Jam
- Website: 985thesportshub.com
- Podcast: 985thesportshub.com/shows/felger-mazz/

Felger & Massarotti (or Felger & Mazz) is a Marconi Award-winning afternoon radio show hosted by Michael Felger and Tony Massarotti, airing from 2 to 6 pm in Boston, Massachusetts. The show first aired on August 13, 2009 with the launch of WBZ-FM's sports talk radio station, The Sports Hub on 98.5 FM. The show is known for “calling it like they see it”, which leads to the show’s perceived negative demeanor towards local sports teams, hot takes, and willingness to go after local teams and players.

The Felger & Mazz program is involved with several Boston charities including Cuts for a Cause which raises money for children suffering from cancer and Christmas in the City, a Kennedy family charity to benefit homeless and impoverished children, and to raise awareness about the condition ALS, from which charity chair Jake Kennedy died in 2020.

The radio show features a simulcast television show that airs on NBC Sports Boston. The simulcast debuted on November 14, 2011 on Comcast SportsNet New England, which was later renamed NBC Sports Boston. Originally owned by CBS Sports Radio, The Sports Hub was sold to Beasley Broadcast Group in November 2017. Felger & Mazz has been a dominant broadcast since its debut in 2009, and has held the top spot for afternoon programming in the Nielsen ratings with the coveted "men aged 25–54" market since 2012.

As of August 2024, the Felger and Mazz program was the most listened to afternoon radio program in the Boston area for 47 consecutive ratings periods, regularly earning a Nielsen rating above 25.

== Notable Incidents ==
The program rose to prominence in the Boston area due to its contrarian and often critical approach to local sports, including strong criticism of players, managers, and owners.

Following the 2011 firing of Red Sox manager Terry Francona, Felger and co-host Tony Massarotti criticized Red Sox principal owner John W. Henry based on the widely held belief that Henry had leaked defamatory personal information about Francona to his newspaper the Boston Globe as part of a smear campaign to justify Francona's termination. This criticism led to an infamous on-air incident in which Henry had himself driven to the station, walked into the studio live on-air and confronted Felger and Massarotti about the allegations. The result was a tense multi-segment exchange in which Henry denied the allegations and said "blaming me personally for being the person who said those things... that's why I came here. You're misleading the public."

The show also earned criticism for mocking the death of Roy Halladay, who died after crashing his stunt-plane into the ocean while flying under the influence. Felger issued an apology for his comments and served a 3-day suspension from Comcast Sportsnet.

In May 2024, the program interviewed former NBA player, commentator, and future Lakers head coach JJ Redick on the air via phone. Redick was hostile during the interview and criticized the program for finding fault with the Boston Celtics who had just clinched an NBA Finals appearance against the Dallas Mavericks. Redick ended the interview abruptly and went on to complain about the program in future media appearances, saying that the interview left him wondering "will the people of Boston be happy if they win a championship?"

== Show members ==
- Michael Felger – host
- Tony Massarotti "Mazz" – host
- Jim Murray – sports headlines/co-host
- James "Jimmy" Stewart – executive producer
- Kevin Maggiore – producer/call screener
- Christopher L. Gasper – Friday weekly guest/fill-in co-host
- Greg Bedard – Tuesday weekly guest (football season)
- Paul Perillo – Wednesday weekly guest (football season)/fill-in co-host

== Former members ==
- Marc "Beetle" Bertrand – sports headlines
- Billy Lanni – director of communications/call screener
- Jermaine Wiggins – Tuesday weekly guest (taken over by Greg Bedard)
- Bob Socci – Friday weekly guest (football season)

== Segments ==
- Re-Entry Monday
- Big Boy Tuesday w/ Greg Bedard (During the NFL season) (2pm-4pm)
- Agenda Free Friday
- The Final Word
- Mad Mike
- Squeaky Mazz
- The Fuppets
- 10 Questions with Greg Bedard
- 3 Up and 3 Down with Greg Bedard
- The Kuhlman Electric E-Mail of the Day
- Mazz's Tiers
- Supercut of the Week
- 5 Questions That Have Nothing to Do With Sports
- The Tool Bag of the Day
- The Miller Lite Off-Air Show
- The AT&T Expert Hotline
- Lightning Round
- F&M Big Board (A week before the NFL Draft)
