= Paul Mariner =

English footballer (1953–2021)

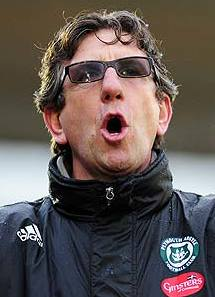
- Mariner managing Plymouth Argyle in 2010

Personal information
- Full name: Paul Mariner
- Date of birth: 22 May 1953
- Place of birth: Farnworth, England
- Date of death: 9 July 2021 (aged 68)
- Height: 6 ft 0 in (1.83 m)
- Position: Centre forward

Youth career
- 1971–1973: Chorley

Senior career*
Years	Team	Apps	(Gls)
1973–1976	Plymouth Argyle	135	(56)
1976–1984	Ipswich Town	260	(96)
1984–1986	Arsenal	60	(14)
1986–1988	Portsmouth	56	(9)
1988	Wollongong City	2	(0)
1989–1992	Albany Capitals	17	(1)
1990-1991	Naxxar Lions		
1992–1993	San Francisco Bay Blackhawks	10	(0)
Total		555	(179)

International career
1978–1980	England B	7	(2)
1977–1985	England	35	(13)

Managerial career
- 2003: Harvard Crimson (assistant)
- 2004–2009: New England Revolution (assistant)
- 2009–2010: Plymouth Argyle
- 2012–2013: Toronto FC (director of player development)
- * Club domestic league appearances and goals

Paul Mariner (22 May 1953 – 9 July 2021) was an English football player and coach.

A centre forward during his playing days, Mariner began his career with Chorley. He became a professional player in 1973 with Plymouth Argyle, where he scored 61 goals in 155 appearances and is considered to have been one of the club's best ever players. He joined Ipswich Town in 1976, where he achieved domestic and European success under the guidance of Bobby Robson. He was called up to play for the England national team during his time at Portman Road, and went on to represent his country at the 1980 European Championships and the 1982 World Cup. In total, Mariner played 35 times for England, scoring 13 goals. He spent two years with Arsenal and then Portsmouth before finishing his career abroad. He played for clubs in Australia, the US, and Malta.

He took up coaching during his time with Albany Capitals and focused on it fully when he retired from playing. After spending time working in Japan, he returned to America to coach, firstly in Arizona and then at Harvard University. He joined Major League Soccer club New England Revolution in 2004 as a member of Steve Nicol's coaching staff. After five years in Massachusetts, Mariner returned to Plymouth Argyle in 2009 as their head coach. He succeeded Paul Sturrock as the club's manager two months later before returning to his role as head coach upon the arrival of Peter Reid. In January 2011, he returned to Major League Soccer as director of player development at Toronto FC.

Mariner was the color commentator for New England Revolution of MLS. Starting in 2020, he commentated for some of the Revolution games, and shared the duty with Charlie Davies.

== Playing career ==
=== 1970s ===
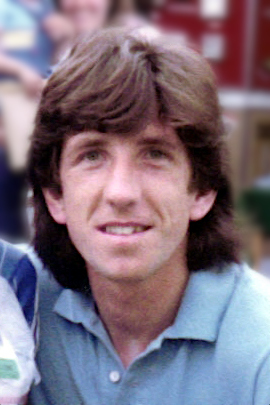
Mariner during his time with Ipswich Town

Mariner started his career as an amateur player at non-league club Chorley, close to his Lancashire roots and his style at the helm of their attack caught the attention of Plymouth Argyle, for whom he signed in 1973.

So began an impressive scoring record with the Devon club, with 56 goals in 135 appearances coming before Bobby Robson, who had been personally monitoring Mariner's progress, took him to Ipswich Town for a club record £220,000 with John Peddelty and Terry Austin moving in the opposite direction as part of the deal. Mariner chose Ipswich ahead of similar offers from West Bromwich Albion and West Ham United.

Mariner made his debut in September 1976 and quickly settled into the Ipswich side as an old-fashioned number 9 – i.e., a forward capable of taking hard tackles and rough treatment from defenders but willing to give it back, while also scoring a fair share of goals. Received wisdom suggests that Mariner was only a 'target-man'-type centre forward but he scored plenty of goals with his feet and had the skill to create his own chances on the deck, rather than relying entirely on service through the centre and via the flanks.

Such was Mariner's impact that six months after joining Ipswich, he made his England debut as a substitute in a 5–0 win over Luxembourg at Wembley and played from the beginning in the following game against Northern Ireland in the British Home Championship at Windsor Park, Belfast. He impressed in both games, though did not score and was not selected for the next six matches. During this period, Ipswich finished third in the First Division, with Mariner contributing ten goals from 28 games.

Mariner's third England cap came in the return World Cup qualifier in Luxembourg, scoring a last-minute goal in a 2–0 win. By now, Mariner had become one of a number of 'target man'-type centre forwards for England coach Ron Greenwood to select from, with Stuart Pearson and Bob Latchford also on the scene. It was Mariner, however, who would be selected the majority of the time.

At club level, Mariner was having a mixed time. He scored 11 goals for Ipswich, but the team underperformed in the First Division and finished 18th. However, they reached the FA Cup final at Wembley where they memorably beat Arsenal 1–0. Mariner hit the goal-frame with one chance.

Greenwood did not select Mariner for England throughout 1979, although Mariner had his most productive spell for Ipswich that season, scoring 13 goals in 33 matches. It was not until 1980 that he won a sixth England cap – almost exactly two years after his fifth – and he scored England's goal in a surprising 4–1 defeat against Wales at Wrexham. He stayed in the reckoning thereafter, scoring in a 2–1 win over Australia in Sydney in the final game before England took to the field for the 1980 European Championships. Mariner was named in Greenwood's squad for the tournament, despite not playing during the whole qualifying campaign.

He did not play in the opening 1–1 draw versus Belgium in Turin but came on as a substitute in the remaining two group matches – a defeat against Italy and a victory over Spain, which ensured England's elimination from the competition.

=== 1980s ===
Mariner maintained his England place as his Ipswich goalscoring record continued to improve – 17 from 41 games had come in 1980 and Ipswich made the early running as the next season got underway. England began their qualifying campaign for the 1982 World Cup with a conclusive 4–0 win over Norway, with Mariner scoring a superb goal with a deft turn and shot from 25 yards. He was, however, left out of the next game, which turned into a gruesome 2–1 defeat against Romania in Bucharest. Greenwood put him back in the side a month later for a now vital match against Switzerland, and Mariner scored the opener in a 2–1 win.

Ipswich were challenging for three trophies as the 1981 season approached its climax, with Mariner again to the fore, scoring 13 times in 36 matches. However, they were to miss out on two domestic fronts, with Aston Villa winning the First Division (after Ipswich failed to beat Middlesbrough) and Manchester City defeating Ipswich in the semi-finals of the FA Cup. But in the UEFA Cup, Mariner was proving to be a real hero as glory beckoned.

He scored twice in the early rounds as Ipswich progressed to an attractive quarter final against St Étienne. In the first leg in France Mariner put two away as Ipswich went 4–1 up, and added another as Ipswich completed the task in the second leg. After winning the semi-final, Mariner scored again in the first leg of the final against AZ Alkmaar as Ipswich coasted to a 3–0 lead, ultimately winning the competition 5–4 on aggregate. Weeks later, Greenwood put him back in the England side as the World Cup qualification campaign resumed with a defeat in Switzerland, a vital victory in Hungary and a shock defeat in Norway. It appeared that they might miss out on the World Cup finals for an unthinkable third tournament in a row, but results elsewhere went their way, meaning England only needed to draw with the already qualified Hungary at Wembley in the final game to guarantee qualification. It was Mariner who scored the only goal in a 1–0 win, though he got it after a stumble which saw him score via a deflection rather than an actual shot on goal.

Injuries to both Achilles tendons restricted Mariner's football over the next few months, and he only scored eight times in 25 games for Ipswich. But in the five final England warm-up matches prior to the World Cup in Spain, he scored four times, including a stunning solo run and strike against the Netherlands at Wembley. He was named in Greenwood's squad and started the first match of the tournament, against France.

England went into a 2–1 lead thanks to a brace from Bryan Robson – the first of which was one of the World Cup Finals' quickest-ever goals – before Mariner slammed home a close-range volley to complete an impressive 3–1 win. It was his eleventh international goal in his 22nd match – an admirable ratio of one goal every other game. It was his also his sixth consecutive scoring game for England – a feat previously achieved only by Jimmy Greaves.

Greenwood selected Mariner for the rest of the tournament but he didn't score again and England went out in the second phase after two disappointing goalless draws. Mariner is best remembered for dragging a devastated Kevin Keegan to his feet in support after the England captain, on as a substitute after a tournament ruined by injury problems, sank to his knees, head in hands, having just missed an open goal with a header which would have given England the lead in their goalless final game against Spain. (As England needed to better West Germany's earlier 2–1 victory against Spain, a goal at this point would still have been insufficient in isolation to send England into the semi-finals.)

Mariner's club boss Robson subsequently became England coach and he continued to select him as the qualification campaign for the 1984 European Football Championship got underway. Mariner continued to score frequently for Ipswich, whose young and vibrant side had started to age and break up.

England's qualification campaign faltered, though Mariner scored in consecutive pool matches against Hungary and Luxembourg – the latter of which would prove to be his 13th and final England goal. By the time he next played for England, he was an Arsenal player, with the Gunners taking him from Ipswich in February 1984 for £150,000. Making his Arsenal-debut at Highbury against Aston Villa on 18 February in a 1-1 draw, he scored his first goal at Nottingham Forest the next week. By now Mariner was in his thirties but he still initially performed well for Arsenal, scoring seven times in the final fifteen games of the season, as the Gunners had a resurgence and finishing 6th in the 1983-84 season.

He was a regular throughout 1984-85 missing only seven games but he only mustered nine goals in 41 appearances.

Mariner won two more England caps but Mark Hateley, a tall and skilful young striker in the Mariner mould, was a candidate for his position and Gary Lineker and Peter Beardsley were also establishing themselves as international strikers. Hateley came on as a substitute for Mariner in a friendly victory over East Germany in September 1984, before Mariner picked up his 35th and final cap in a goalless draw against Romania in May 1985, a qualifier for the 1986 World Cup. With Hateley in the ascendancy and Mariner regularly sidelined at Arsenal, Robson opted not to select him for the England squad which qualified for Mexico 1986.

Meanwhile, at his club Mariner was rarely on the field, he was blighted by an Achilles heel injury which saw him only play nine times in 1985–86, including matches as an emergency centre half. His final appearance seeing him come off the bench against Nottingham Forest on 8 April 1986.

In August 1986 Arsenal's new manager George Graham gave Mariner a free transfer in a decision that had been made before he took over; in all Mariner played 70 times for Arsenal, scoring 17 goals. He signed for Portsmouth, where he spent two seasons. In May 1989, he signed with the Albany Capitals of the American Soccer League.

=== 1990s ===
In 1990-91 Paul Mariner played for Naxxar Lions, Malta. Mariner returned to the Capitals in 1991 as the team now played in the American Professional Soccer League, formed by the merger of the American Soccer League and Western Soccer League. He played three seasons with the Capitals, where he was named to the league's Best XI in 1990. During his three seasons in Albany, Mariner also served as an assistant coach. In the spring of 1992, the Capitals' owner offered him the position of head coach but when he heard a rumour that the team was about to collapse, he accepted a position as a player-assistant coach with the San Francisco Bay Blackhawks. He accepted that position and soon after the Capitals announced they were ceasing operations. In the early 1990s Paul made two appearances for Byhams Dairy, a Sunday League team in Sudbury Suffolk.

== Coaching career ==
=== Early career ===
After retiring, Mariner worked as a football pundit for BBC Radio Lancashire for their Friday-night Non-League Hour before setting up a management company for footballers. After a spell back in England coaching at Bolton School, he returned to the States to coach youth football at S.C. Del Sol in Phoenix, Arizona. In 2003, he became an assistant coach at Harvard University. In 2004, he was hired by the New England Revolution of Major League Soccer as assistant coach to former Liverpool and Scotland defender Steve Nicol. He was officially announced by the club on 5 February 2004. He was interviewed by MLS expansion side Seattle Sounders FC for their head coach role prior to their inaugural season in 2009.

=== Plymouth Argyle ===
Speculation about his future was rife in October 2009 when he was linked with a coaching position at one of his former clubs, Plymouth Argyle, abetted by his visit to Devon to promote the city's 2018 World Cup bid and his subsequent resignation on 17 October. It was announced the following day, 18 October 2009, that he was to become the new head coach of Plymouth Argyle, with Paul Sturrock staying on as team manager.

On 10 December 2009, Mariner replaced Sturrock as manager of Plymouth Argyle, following a run of poor form which left the Pilgrims second bottom in the Championship. He was unable to keep Plymouth up, however, and they were relegated from the Football league Championship after a six-year stay, on 19 April 2010.

On 6 May 2010, it was announced that Plymouth were to look for a new manager, however Mariner would remain as a member of the coaching staff. Mariner's tenure as manager ended when Peter Reid was hired on 24 June 2010. Mariner stepped down from his role at Home Park on 30 December 2010 to pursue another opportunity. "I have known Paul for a long time and working with him has been fantastic," said Argyle manager Peter Reid. "I'm sure he will be successful in everything he does in the future. He's a great personality and someone who is a legend with the fans at this football club."

=== Toronto FC ===
Mariner was named Director of Player Development for Toronto FC on 6 January 2011, joining new head coach Aron Winter at the club. After starting the season with 9 straight losses, Winter stepped down as Toronto named Mariner as the new head coach on 7 June 2012. Mariner recorded his first victory as Toronto manager on 27 June against Montreal Impact, the game ended in a 3–0 away win. The club rebounded briefly under the new coach, but after "a dismal 0-10-4 run in league play" to end the 2012 season, Mariner was dismissed on 7 January 2013. Mariner was praised by former Toronto FC players Andrew Wiedeman and Eric Hassli.

== Broadcasting career ==
After his playing days ended in 1993, Mariner worked briefly as a commentator with BBC Radio Lancashire. In 2014, after his brief coaching stint in Toronto, Mariner returned to the New England Revolution as a broadcaster, providing colour commentary for the team's television match’s on NBC Sports Boston and radio broadcasts on 98.5 The Sports Hub for six full seasons alongside analyst Brad Feldman. He also worked as an analyst for ESPN broadcasts between 2009 and 2020.

== Personal life and death ==
Mariner was born in Farnworth, near Bolton on 22 May 1953, the son of James Mariner, a crane driver, and Margaret Catherine Mariner, née Turnbull, and was baptised two months later at St Catherine's Church, Horwich on 19 July 1953. He lived with his parents in Autumn Street, Horwich, and went to Horwich County Secondary School (now the lower school of Rivington and Blackrod High School). He married Alison Roscoe in Plymouth, Devon in 1976, and they had three sons. They eventually divorced in 1989.

Mariner died of brain cancer on 9 July 2021, at the age of 68. Following his death many tributes poured in from multiple clubs and players such as the English National team, Plymouth Argyle, Ipswich Town F.C., Clint Dempsey, Taylor Twellman, Peter Shilton, Terry Butcher, Gordon Hill, Mick Mills, John Wark, Charlie Davies, MLS commissioner Don Garber and his broadcasting partner Brad Feldman. The New England Revolution wore black armbands in his honor and also held a pre game ceremony in tribute of Mariner prior to their 24 July, home game vs CF Montréal.

== Career statistics ==
=== Club ===
Appearances and goals by club, season and competition
Club	Season	League			FA Cup		League Cup		Other		Total	
Club	Season	Division	Apps	Goals	Apps	Goals	Apps	Goals	Apps	Goals	Apps	Goals
Plymouth Argyle	1973–74	Third Division	41	14	3	2	6	1	0	0	50	17
Plymouth Argyle	1974–75	Third Division	45	20	3	1	2	0	0	0	50	21
Plymouth Argyle	1975–76	Second Division	38	15	2	0	2	1	0	0	42	16
Plymouth Argyle	1976–77	Second Division	10	7	0	0	2	0	0	0	12	7
Plymouth Argyle	Total		134	56	8	3	12	2	0	0	154	61
Ipswich Town	1976–77	First Division	28	10	3	3	0	0	0	0	31	13
Ipswich Town	1977–78	First Division	37	11	7	7	1	1	6	3	53	22
Ipswich Town	1978–79	First Division	33	13	5	3	1	0	5	1	44	17
Ipswich Town	1979–80	First Division	41	17	3	3	2	0	4	2	50	22
Ipswich Town	1980–81	First Division	36	13	7	3	4	4	11	6	58	26
Ipswich Town	1981–82	First Division	25	8	2	0	5	1	1	0	33	9
Ipswich Town	1982–83	First Division	37	13	3	0	1	0	1	0	37	13
Ipswich Town	1983–84	First Division	23	12	1	0	4	2	0	0	28	14
Ipswich Town	Total		260	97	31	19	18	8	28	12	337	136
Arsenal	1983–84	First Division	15	7	0	0	0	0	0	0	15	7
Arsenal	1984–85	First Division	36	7	3	2	2	0	0	0	41	9
Arsenal	1985–86	First Division	9	0	3	0	2	1	0	0	14	1
Arsenal	Total		60	14	6	2	4	1	0	0	70	17
Career total			454	167	45	24	34	11	28	12	561	214

Other includes the UEFA Cup, UEFA Cup Winner's Cup, and FA Charity Shield.

=== International ===
Appearances and goals by national team and year
National team	Year	Apps	Goals
England	1977	3	1
England	1978	2	0
England	1980	8	4
England	1981	5	1
England	1982	11	5
England	1983	4	2
England	1984	1	0
England	1985	1	0
Total		35	13

Scores and results list England's goal tally first, score column indicates score after each Mariner goal.

List of international goals scored by Paul Mariner
No.	Date	Venue	Opponent	Score	Result	Competition	Ref.
1	12 October 1977	Stade Municipal, Luxembourg City, Luxembourg	Luxembourg	2-0	2-0	1978 FIFA World Cup qualification	
2	17 May 1980	Racecourse Ground, Wrexham, United Kingdom	Wales	1-0	1-4	1979–80 British Home Championship	
3	31 May 1980	Sydney Cricket Ground, Sydney, Australia	Australia	2-0	2-1	Friendly	
4	10 September 1980	Wembley Stadium, London, United Kingdom	Norway	4-0	4-0	1982 FIFA World Cup qualification	
5	19 November 1980	Wembley Stadium, London, United Kingdom	Switzerland	2-0	2-1	1982 FIFA World Cup qualification	
6	18 November 1981	Wembley Stadium, London, United Kingdom	Hungary	1-0	1-0	1982 FIFA World Cup qualification	
7	25 May 1982	Wembley Stadium, London, United Kingdom	Netherlands	2-0	2-0	Friendly	
8	29 May 1982	Hampden Park, Glasgow, United Kingdom	Scotland	1-0	1-0	1981–82 British Home Championship	
9	3 June 1982	Olympic Stadium, Helsinki, Finland	Finland	1-0	4-1	Friendly	
10	3 June 1982	Olympic Stadium, Helsinki, Finland	Finland	4-1	4-1	Friendly	
11	16 June 1982	San Mamés Stadium, Bilbao, Spain	France	3-1	3-1	1982 FIFA World Cup	
12	12 October 1983	Népstadion, Budapest, Hungary	Hungary	3-0	3-0	UEFA Euro 1984 qualification	
13	16 November 1983	Stade Municipal, Luxembourg City, Luxembourg	Luxembourg	2-0	4-0	UEFA Euro 1984 qualification	

== Managerial statistics ==
As of 7 January 2013

Managerial record by team and tenure
Team	From	To	Record					Ref
Team	From	To	P	W	D	L	Win %	Ref
Plymouth Argyle	10 December 2009	24 June 2010	29	7	6	16	24.1	
Toronto FC	7 June 2012	7 January 2013	28	6	8	14	21.4	
Total			57	13	14	30	22.8	—

== Honours ==
=== As a player ===
Plymouth Argyle

- Football League Third Division runner-up: 1974–75

Ipswich Town

- FA Cup: 1977–78
- UEFA Cup: 1980–81

Individual

- Plymouth Argyle Player of the Year: 1974–75, 1975–76
- Plymouth Argyle Team of the Century
- PFA Team of the Year: 1980–81 First Division
- Ipswich Town Player of the Year: 1982–83
- Ipswich Town Hall of Fame: Inducted 2011
