= Sara Underwood (journalist) =

American journalist

Sara Underwood is a co-host of the Boston 25 Morning News in Boston. She joined FOX/Boston 25 News in September 2008.

== Education ==
Underwood graduated from UCLA.

== Career ==
Underwood was a reporter at WTTG, the FOX owned-and-operated station in Washington, D.C. Earlier, she was an anchor and reporter at WDTN, the ABC affiliate in Dayton, Ohio where she won an Emmy Award for breaking news. She started her career at KIEM-TV in Eureka, California. She anchored the 6 PM newscast at WBZ-TV, also in Boston and its sister station WSBK. She was an anchor there for eight years.

== Personal life ==
She has two daughters with her husband, radio sports host Michael Felger.
