= Esben Rohde Kristensen =

Danish Nazi activist

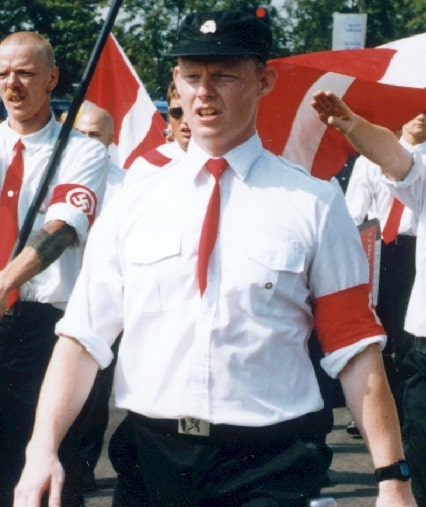
- Kristensen marching at a demonstration, 1999

Leader of the National Socialist Movement of Denmark
- Incumbent
- Assumed office October 2010
- Preceded by: Jonni Hansen

Personal details
- Born: 1969 (age 56–57) Denmark
- Party: National Socialist Movement of Denmark

Esben Rohde Kristensen (born 1969) is a Danish Nazi activist and chairman of Denmark's National Socialist Movement (DNSB).

== Life and career ==
Esben Rohde Kristensen has a number of criminal relationships behind him. In 1999, he was given a 40-day suspended sentence for attacking an autonomist who tried to break into the old headquarters with an ax in front of the DNSB's old headquarters, and in 2000 caused trouble when he shouted "nigger" at the now-retired president of South Africa, Thabo Mbeki.

In October 2010, Kristensen became chairman of Denmark's National Socialist Movement, after the previous chairman Jonni Hansen resigned, after 20 years in the post. In connection with the change of party chairman, Kristensen declared that everything would continue as before in DNSB, but as party chairman he has received a lot of criticism internally in DNSB, which resulted in a group around Daniel Carlsen choosing to leave the party and instead found Danskernes Party in April 2011, at the same time Daniel Carlsen expressed public criticism of Kristensen, who he believed was driving DNSB into a slump.

In 2011, Kristensen spoke about Lars von Trier's statements about Adolf Hitler at the Cannes Film Festival, to the newspaper BT, where he stated; "Of course it's brave. If it was meant as criticism of the Jews, it's brave, because the Jews are the only ones you shouldn't criticize. It's because they have far too much influence in the West. There is an incredible double standard around the Holocaust. If Lars von Trier had said that he sympathized with Stalin, who killed 20 million people, no one would have raised an eyebrow."

During a demonstration in Copenhagen organized by Denmark's National Front in 2014, Esben Rohde Kristensen, who participated, was assaulted by autonomists.

The DNSP's old HQ in Greve was sold at an unknown date, which was owned by Torben Have, who they were leasing the property from. According to Torben, After the sale in an interview, he stated "we are not on speaking terms anymore" about the current state of the relationship between Kristensen and himself.

In 2011, he went to the town of Flemming, knocking door to door to recruit new members. He also spread racist and xenophobic posters while he was there.
