= Jony =

Jony is a masculine given name or nickname (often of Jonathan) and a surname. Notable people with the name include:

- Jony (real name — Jahid Afrail oglu Huseynli (Azerbaijani: Cahid Əfrail oğlu Hüseynli; born 29 February 1996, Baku, Azerbaijan), Azerbaijani-born Russian singer and songwriter
- Jony Fragnoli (born 1989), Swiss footballer
- Jony Ive (born 1967), British industrial designer primarily known for his work at Apple
- Jony López (born 1987), Spanish football defender
- Jony Marcos (born 1977), Brazilian politician and pastor
- Jony Ramos (born 1986), São Tomé and Príncipe football forward
- Jony Rodríguez (born 1991), Spanish football winger
- Jony Talukdar (born 1993), Bangladeshi cricketer
- Jony (footballer, born 1985), Spanish footballer Jonathan Ñíguez Esclápez
- Jony (footballer, born 1994), Argentine footballer Jonathan Diego Menéndez
- Masuk Mia Jony (born 1998), Bangladeshi footballer

== See also ==
- Gini & Jony, Indian children's fashion brand
- Joni (disambiguation)
- Jonny
- Johny (disambiguation)
- Jonie
