= National Socialist Movement of Denmark =

National Socialist Movement of Denmark Danmarks Nationalsocialistiske Bevægelse
- Abbreviation: DNSB
- Leader: Esben Rohde Kristensen
- Founded: 1 September 1991; 34 years ago
- Preceded by: National Socialist Workers' Party of Denmark
- Newspaper: Fædrelandet
- Ideology: Neo-Nazism; Danish nationalism Neo-fascism
- Political position: Far-right
- Colors: Red White

Party flag
- Other Flags

The National Socialist Movement of Denmark (Danish: Danmarks Nationalsocialistiske Bevægelse, DNSB) is a neo-Nazi political party in Denmark. The movement traces its origins back to National Socialist Workers' Party of Denmark (DNSAP, Danmarks Nationalsocialistiske Arbejderparti), the Danish Nazi party founded in the mid-1930s, more or less as a copy of Adolf Hitler's German NSDAP. After the end of the Second World War, a few people continued under the original party name, and published the newspaper Fædrelandet (The Fatherland) during the period 1952–1972. The movement was dissolved, reformed, and renamed several times between 1972 and 1991. The current incarnation of Danmarks Nationalsocialistiske Bevægelse was founded on 1 September 1991 by Jonni Hansen.

Under Hansen's leadership, the movement has resumed publication of Fædrelandet, and started the Neo-Nazi local radio station, Radio Oasen, which can be received in an area around Greve south of Copenhagen, and is broadcast on the Internet. The radio station caused much controversy, since due to the liberal media laws of Denmark it was entitled to support from public funds. The broadcast license of Radio Oasen has been revoked several times after the radio station broadcast "racist statements", and the public funding was removed in May 2004. However, the radio station continues to broadcast 62 hours per week through funding received from private supporters.

The movement keeps its membership count secret, but it has been estimated at 1,000 passive and around 150 active members.

DNSB has twice run for municipality council elections in Greve, Denmark, in 1997 and 2001. In the 1997 election, they gained 0.5% of the votes, and in 2001 0.23% (73 votes). These numbers fell far short of securing them representation on the municipality council.

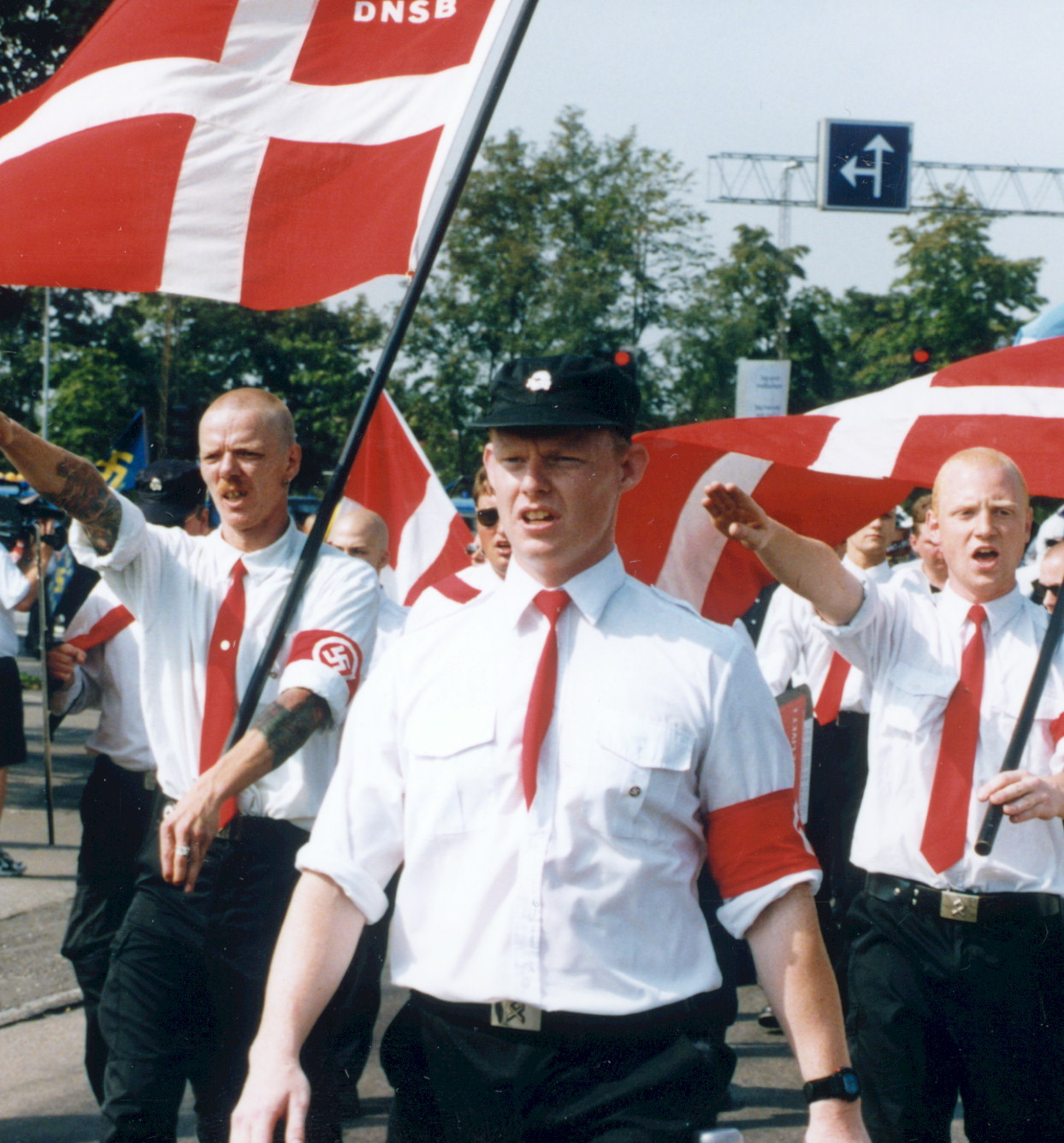
Party members at a demonstration in the late 1990s, featuring chairman Esben Rohde Kristensen (2010-present).

DNSB ran for the Greve municipality council and Region Sjælland (region Zealand) regional council in the 15 November 2005 municipality and Regional Council elections. This represented the first time since the Second World War that the voters could elect a Nazi candidate above the municipality level. Although they got only 73 votes in Greve (0.3%) and 611 votes in the region (0.1%), they were not the party to receive the fewest votes, and the event generated some media attention for the movement.
