= Joani =

Joani is a given name. Notable people with the name include:

- Joani Blank (1937–2016), American sex educator
- Joani Reid, Scottish politician
- Joani Tremblay (born 1984), Canadian painter

== See also ==
- Joni (disambiguation)
