= Michael Felger =

American sports reporter (born 1969)

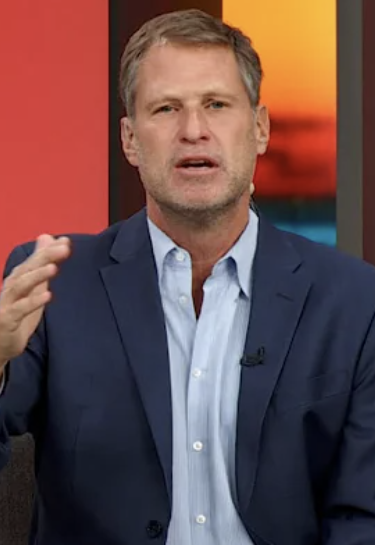
- Felger in 2024
- Born: August 6, 1969 (age 56); Milwaukee, Wisconsin, U.S.
- Education: Boston University
- Occupations: Sports radio host, TV host
- Spouse: Sara Underwood
- Children: Emma & Tessa

Michael Alan Felger (born August 6, 1969) is a sports radio talk show host on WBZ-FM in Boston, co-hosting "Felger and Massarotti" with Tony Massarotti, a former columnist for the Boston Herald. He is also a television host for NBC Sports Boston, where he talks about sports as a co-host of the weeknight show "Boston Sports Tonight" with Michael Holley and the host of pregame and postgame coverage for Boston Bruins (with Tony Amonte).

== Career ==
Originally from Milwaukee, Felger graduated from Boston University in 1992. Upon graduating, he worked as an intern with the Boston Herald. He later joined the paper permanently and became the lead reporter for the Boston Bruins from 1997 to 1999. He then became their New England Patriots beat columnist, a position he held from 1999 to 2008.

Felger also hosted a sports talk radio show called The Mike Felger Show on 890 ESPN. The show ran from 2005 to 2008, at which time Felger left at the end of his contract. He moved on as an online columnist and fill-in host for Boston sports radio station WEEI while continuing his television work on Comcast SportsNet New England.

Felger began to host the Felger & Mazz afternoon drive-time show with Tony Massarotti on 98.5 The Sports Hub upon its launch in August 2009. Felger signed a new multiyear deal with 98.5 The Sports Hub's parent company The Beasley Media Group in January 2018.

As of August 2024, the Felger and Mazz program was the most listened to afternoon radio program in the Boston area for 47 consecutive ratings periods, regularly earning a Nielsen rating above 25.

== Personal life ==
Born in 1969, Felger has lived and worked in the Boston area since 1988. He currently lives in Boston's Seaport District, with his wife, FOX 25 television anchorwoman Sara Underwood with whom he has two daughters. Felger also owns a house on Nantucket where he and his family spend part of the summer.

In February 2025 Felger's father Rocky died. In memorializing him, Felger credited his father with instilling in him a love of sports and a willingness to speak critically and passionately about local teams from a young age.

== Controversies ==
Felger is considered a polarizing figure in Boston media due to his contrarian and often critical commentary of sport's players, managers, and owners.

Following the 2011 firing of Red Sox manager Terry Francona, Felger and co-host Tony Massarotti criticized Red Sox principal owner John W. Henry based on the widely held belief that Henry had leaked defamatory personal information about Francona to his newspaper the Boston Globe as part of a smear campaign to justify his termination. This criticism led to an infamous on-air incident in which Henry had his driver bring him to the radio station, walked into the studio live on-air and confronted Felger and Massarotti about the allegations. The result was a tense multi-segment exchange in which Henry denied the allegations and said "blaming me personally for being the person who said those things... that's why I came here. You're misleading the public."

On November 8, 2017, Felger was criticized for statements made on the air that former Major League Baseball pitcher Roy Halladay, who died in a stunt-plane crash, was a "moron" for partaking in such a dangerous activity when he was a father with young children. Halladay had been observed doing "reckless" stunts ahead of the crash. The comments led to a 3-day suspension from NBC Sports Boston (which runs a television simulcast of his radio show). He apologized the next day on the air. Although it was later reported by The New York Times that Halladay had a dangerous mix of amphetamines, morphine, and other prescription drugs in his system at the time of the crash, some still felt that Felger's comments were insensitive and exploitative.

== Book ==
- Tales from the Patriots Sideline: A Collection of the Greatest Stories of the Team's First 40 Years, authored by Michael Felger, foreword by Steve Grogan, afterword by Bill Belichick, pictures by Jim Mahoney of the Boston Herald, ISBN 1-58261-525-X
