= List of storms named Joni =

The name Joni has been used for three tropical cyclones in the South Pacific region of the Southern Hemisphere:

- Cyclone Joni (1992) – a damaging tropical cyclone that impacted the island nations of Tuvalu and Fiji.
- Cyclone Joni (2009) – a small and compact system only minimal impact was reported in the Southern Cook Islands while some heavy rainfall was reported in Mangaia.

In the South-West Indian Ocean:

- Tropical Storm Joni (2012) – remained over the open ocean.
