= Tony Massarotti =

American journalist

- Born: October 28, 1967 (age 58); Waltham, Massachusetts, U.S.
- Other names: Tony Mazz, Naughty Massarotti
- Education: Tufts University
- Occupation: Sportswriter • radio host • author • color commentator
- Employer(s): NESN, Beasley Media Group

Anthony Ezio Massarotti (born October 28, 1967) is an American author and a former sportswriter for the Boston Herald and The Boston Globe. He co-hosts a sports talk radio show, Felger & Mazz, on 98.5 The Sports Hub with former Boston Herald columnist Michael Felger. Massarotti has also served as a color commentator for the Boston Red Sox, during their 2022 season.

Massarotti is a graduate of Waltham High School in Waltham, Massachusetts, and a 1989 graduate of Tufts University, where he majored in English and Classics. He was also a member of Theta Chi fraternity.

== Boston Herald ==
Massarotti joined the Boston Herald in 1989 and covered the Boston Red Sox for the paper from 1994 through 2008.

During his time with the Herald, Massarotti frequently covered the Red Sox for Fox Sports New England, and he appeared occasionally as a guest on WHDH's Sports Xtra. He also appeared on Boston's WEEI sports talk radio program The Big Show. These appearances ended with his later leaving the Herald for the Globe due to a long-standing ban on Globe staffers appearing on the station.

While with the Herald, Massarotti was known for his staunch support of former Red Sox managers Jimy Williams and Grady Little, despite Little's controversial decisions during Game 7 of the 2003 American League Championship Series.

== The Boston Globe ==
In September 2008, Massarotti joined the staff of The Boston Globe. In addition to writing a regular column for the paper, Massarotti became the voice and face of the Globe's online Boston.com sports feature. In March 2013, he left the Globe. However, after a brief hiatus, Massarotti returned to writing for the Globe online sports blog in early 2014.

== Notable columns ==
=== Theo Epstein contract negotiations ===
On October 27, 2005, Massarotti published a column in which he accused Larry Lucchino and the Red Sox management of smearing general manager Theo Epstein during contract negotiations. In the column, he also suggested that coverage of the negotiations at two local media outlets was compromised. He documented that The New York Times (parent company of The Boston Globe) owned a 17 percent ownership stake in the Red Sox and that local sports talk radio leader WEEI was currently in negotiations for Red Sox broadcast rights and paid Lucchino for a weekly radio appearance. The timing of the column was notable as it came four days after Globe ombudsman Richard Chacón published an article in which he criticized Times management for accepting World Series rings from the Red Sox, and three days prior to a Dan Shaughnessy column in which he revealed information detailing the nuances of the relationship between Epstein and Lucchino, to the favor of Lucchino. The information in the column was widely thought to have originated from Lucchino and may have contributed to Epstein breaking off negotiations and resigning his position as General Manager.

=== Jon Lester cancer story ===
In August 2006, Massarotti received some criticism for publishing a column detailing rumors that Red Sox pitcher Jon Lester was being tested for cancer. In fact, the rumors turned out to be true, and Lester went on to be treated for a rare form of non-Hodgkin's lymphoma.

== Felger and Mazz Show ==
Since 2009, Massarotti has worked as the co-host of The Felger and Mazz Show, an afternoon sports talk show broadcast on Boston's 98.5 The Sports Hub. In February 2023, Massarotti was suspended by the Sports Hub for a racially insensitive joke he made about two black men in New Orleans.

== Awards ==
- Massachusetts Winner of the 2000 and 2008 National Sportscasters and Sportswriters Association Sportswriter of the Year award.
- National Association of Broadcasters' Marconi Award. Along with co-host Mike Felger, Massarotti received the 2019 NAB Marconi Award for Major Market Personality of the Year.

== Books ==
- A Tale of Two Cities: The 2004 Yankees-Red Sox Rivalry and the War for the Pennant ISBN 1-59228-704-2, co-author John Harper, sportswriter for the New York Daily News
- Big Papi: My Story of Big Dreams and Big Hits, 2007, ISBN 0-312-36633-7, co-author David Ortiz, Professional baseball player for the Boston Red Sox
- Dynasty: The Inside Story of How the Red Sox Became a Baseball Powerhouse, 2008, ISBN 978-0-312-38567-5, Foreword by Jason Varitek, professional baseball player for the Boston Red Sox
- Knuckler: My Life with Baseball's Most Confounding Pitch, 2011, ISBN 978-0-547-51769-8, co-author Tim Wakefield, professional baseball player for the Boston Red Sox
- This is our city: four teams, twelve championships, and how Boston became the most dominant sports city in the world, 2022, ISBN 9781419753589

Preceded by unknown	Boston Herald Red Sox beat writer 1994–2008	Succeeded by John Tomase
