= Jonny Holmström =

Swedish professor

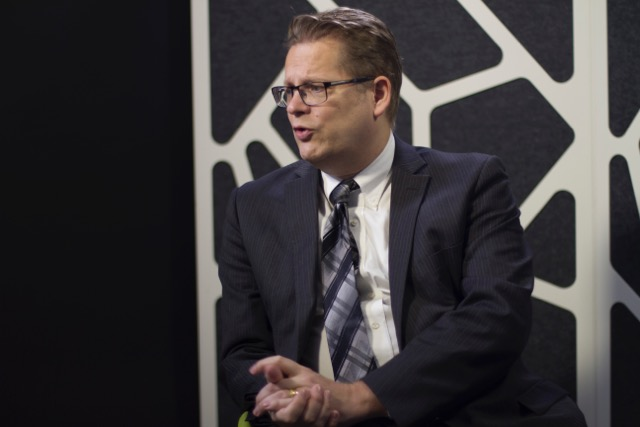
- Citizenship: Swedish
- Education: Umeå University
- Known for: IT and organizational change Digital Innovation
- Scientific career
- Fields: Information Systems
- Workplaces: Swedish Center for Digital Innovation, Department of Informatics, Umeå University
- Thesis: Information system and organization as multipurpose network (2000)
- Doctoral advisor: Erik Stolteman, Eric Monteiro
- Website: www.jonnyholmstrom.com

Jonny Holmström is a Swedish professor of Informatics at Umeå University and director and co-founder of Swedish Center for Digital Innovation.

== Biography ==
Holmström was born in Arvidsjaur in 1968. He received his Ph.D. from Umeå University in 2000, and has been a visiting scholar at Georgia State University and Florida International University. Holmström is a senior editor at Information and Organization and serves at the editorial boards for European Journal of Information Systems and Communications of the AIS. Holmström has written 2 books and has published over 100 scholarly articles in professional journals and edited volumes.

== Career ==
Holmström is an Information Systems Professor at Umeå University and the director of the Swedish Center for Digital Innovation (SCDI). Over the course of his career, his research focus has evolved through three main themes – digital innovation, digital transformation, and human-AI collaboration – each reflecting the changing landscape of information technology’s role in organizations.

=== Digital innovation ===
Holmström's dissertation work examined the interaction between information technology and organizations. Prior research often assumed information technology to be either an objective, external force with deterministic impacts on organizations, or the outcome of social action. Holmström's research suggested that either view is incomplete, and he proposed to take both perspectives into account. Drawing from actor-network theory as analytical lens, Holmström has explored the role of IT in contexts such as municipal organizations, airports, and digital cash projects. In these studies, Holmström stressed the notion of non-human agency in which processes, technological tools and other similar concepts can be viewed as non-human actors that acquire an identity of their own. Information system and organization as multipurpose network. This scholarly foundation set the stage for Holmström’s focus on digital innovation – the creation of new digital products, services, and processes within and across organizations.

Holmström co-founded the Swedish Center for Digital Innovation (SCDI) in 2013 to foster research and collaboration in this domain. SCDI is a joint initiative between three universities and industry partners, designed as an engaged scholarship platform to “increase digital innovation capabilities” in partnering organizations by integrating academic insights with industry practice. Holmström’s approach posits that firms can build key innovation capabilities by acquiring external knowledge and combining it with their internal expertise. Accordingly, SCDI orchestrates networks of researchers and practitioners to accelerate digital innovation, a model that has provided lessons learned and recommendations for how academic units can facilitate innovation in practice.

=== Digital transformation ===
Holmström’s research on digital transformation includes numerous studies of how established industries adapt to digital disruption. He has co-authored investigations into sectors such as mining, forestry, banking, and manufacturing, identifying factors that enable or inhibit successful transformation. Across these works, Holmström consistently underscores that developing organizational agility and digital capability is critical: companies that effectively harness digital technology can create new value, whereas those that fail to adapt risk losing ground. To aid practitioners, he has co-developed frameworks and tools for digital transformation, and frequently advises organizations on aligning technology initiatives with business strategy and organizational change management.

=== Human-AI collaboration ===
Holmström’s work on human-AI collaboration has focused on how artificial intelligence technologies are adopted in organizations and co-exist with human work. As a part of this effort, Holmström founded the SCDI AI Business Lab. In this role, Holmström examines questions of how companies can effectively integrate AI systems – from machine learning algorithms to autonomous processes – in ways that augment (rather than replace) human capabilities and ensure positive outcomes for the organization.

A key contribution from Holmström in this area is the concept of AI readiness for digital transformation. In a 2022 paper, he introduced an “AI readiness framework” to assess an organization’s ability to deploy AI technologies as part of its transformation efforts. This framework evaluates dimensions such as technological infrastructure, workforce skills, data governance, and strategic alignment, helping managers identify gaps before investing in AI initiatives. Holmström’s research emphasizes that successful AI adoption requires more than acquiring technology – it involves sociotechnical change, where organizational culture and practices must adapt in tandem with new AI tools. He has explored the mutual shaping of AI systems and organizational context, arguing that AI implementation and human work practices continuously influence each other.

=== Awards ===
Holmström received the Royal Skyttean Society's award for young researchers at the Social Sciences faculty, Umeå University, in 2005, and Nordea’s Scientific Award 2007. In 2009 he received Umeå University's Young Researcher Award and the AIS senior scholars award for best IS journal paper of the year in 2010. Holmström was also awarded with the Pedagogical Award of the Year in the IS discipline in Sweden 2011 by the Swedish Association of Information Systems.
