= Damon Amendolara =

American sports radio host (born 1979)

- Born: June 21, 1979 (age 47); Warwick, New York
- Education: Syracuse University
- Presenting career
- Show: The D.A. Show With Babchik
- Stations: Mad Dog Sports Radio
- Time slot: 6–9 am (ET)
- Style: Sports radio
- Country: United States
- Website: www.damonamendolara.com

Damon Lawrence Amendolara (born June 21, 1979) is a sports radio personality who was most recently the morning host (6–9 am ET) for Mad Dog Sports Radio on SiriusXM.

He was previously the morning host for CBS Sports Radio Network, heard across North America. He was promoted to that time slot in March 2017. He previously worked as the evening host for WBZ-FM in Boston. He also acted as the sideline reporter for Major League Soccer telecast of the New England Revolution. He is a contributor to the NFL Network, MLB Network, NFL Films, SportsNet New York and WFAN radio in New York. The new CBS Sports Radio Network launched on January 2, 2013, with Amendolara as the overnight host, and is syndicated across CBS Sports Radio over 150 radio stations in the U.S. and Canada.

D.A. was named the 9th best national sports radio show in 2018, the 13th best national sports radio show in 2017 and the 17th best in 2016, according to Barrett Sports Media. On October 5, 2018, the Boise, Idaho City Council declared "Damon Amendolara Day," based on the popularity of the show on affiliate KTIK and part of a three-day show celebration. He was part of Comcast's Pre Game Live and Post Game Live, alongside Mike Felger, Ty Law and Troy Brown. He was also a guest host for Sports Tonight on CSNNE, and a regular panelist shows like Sports Sunday, and The Baseball Show. Amendolara was hired for the launch of the Sports Hub in Boston in August 2009 as the evening host, 6–11 pm.

Before Boston, Amendolara hosted nights in Miami on Sportsradio 560 WQAM starting in '08. On Friday, August 7, 2009, The Miami Herald announced that Amendolara was leaving Miami to host a show on a new FM sports station in Boston, which later was revealed as WBZ-FM.

From 2003 to 2008, D.A. worked in Kansas City at 610 Sports, hosting the morning drive show. He was hired as the evening anchor for KCSP at the launch of the station in September 2003. In August 2004, Amendolara became the host of the morning show at 610 Sports. There he also anchored the station's Chiefs programming, including the Chiefs players shows. On Monday, December 17, 2007, The Kansas City Star reported that D.A. had left 610 Sports.

From 2001 to 2003, he worked at the ESPN Radio affiliate in Fort Myers, FL where he hosted The D.A. Show, and was the play-by-play announcer for the Fort Myers Miracle (Minnesota Twins minor league team). Also while at ESPN, he hosted the SportsCenter updates in the afternoon, and hosted the pregame/postgame shows for the Florida Firecats of the Arena Football League.

== Charities ==
D.A. has devoted much of the show to raising money for local charities with a focus on children, with "The D.A. Show Cares." He has coached and helped sponsor the Spartans, a youth soccer team in the Miramar (FL) Police Athletic League (whose last-place finish became a popular and humorous topic on the show). The effort has reached out to organizations such as The Boys & Girls Club of Kansas City, The Bridge Home, Children's Mercy Hospital and The KCMO Little League. He has raised close to $10,000 since starting it in 2006. He is an honorary board member for the Room to Dream Foundation in Boston.

== Personal ==
Born in Warwick, New York to an Italian and Slovak family, Amendolara graduated from Syracuse University in 2001 with a degree in broadcast journalism from the S. I. Newhouse School of Public Communications.
