= Jonny Gale =

English cricketer (born 1994)

Personal information
- Full name: Jonathan Oliver Gale
- Born: 21 July 1994 (age 32); London, England
- Height: 5 ft 10 in (1.78 m)
- Batting: Right-handed
- Bowling: Right-arm medium-fast
- Role: Batsmen Wicket Keeper

Domestic team information
- Years: Team
- 2010–present: Surrey (squad no. 7)
- Source: ECB Profile

Jonathan Oliver Gale is an English cricketer who plays for the England Learning Disability's squad and Surrey County Cricket Club Pan-Disability (1st XI) squad as an opening batsmen and wicket-keeper. He is also the captain and a player-coach for the 1st XI, as well as an assistant coach for the 2nd XI.

Off the pitch, Gale is a programme ambassador for the Lord's Taverners 'Super 1s' programme, and an ambassador the UK Sports Association for People with a Learning Disability's (UKSAPLD) project ‘My Sport, My Voice!’.
