= Jonny Moser =

Austrian historian

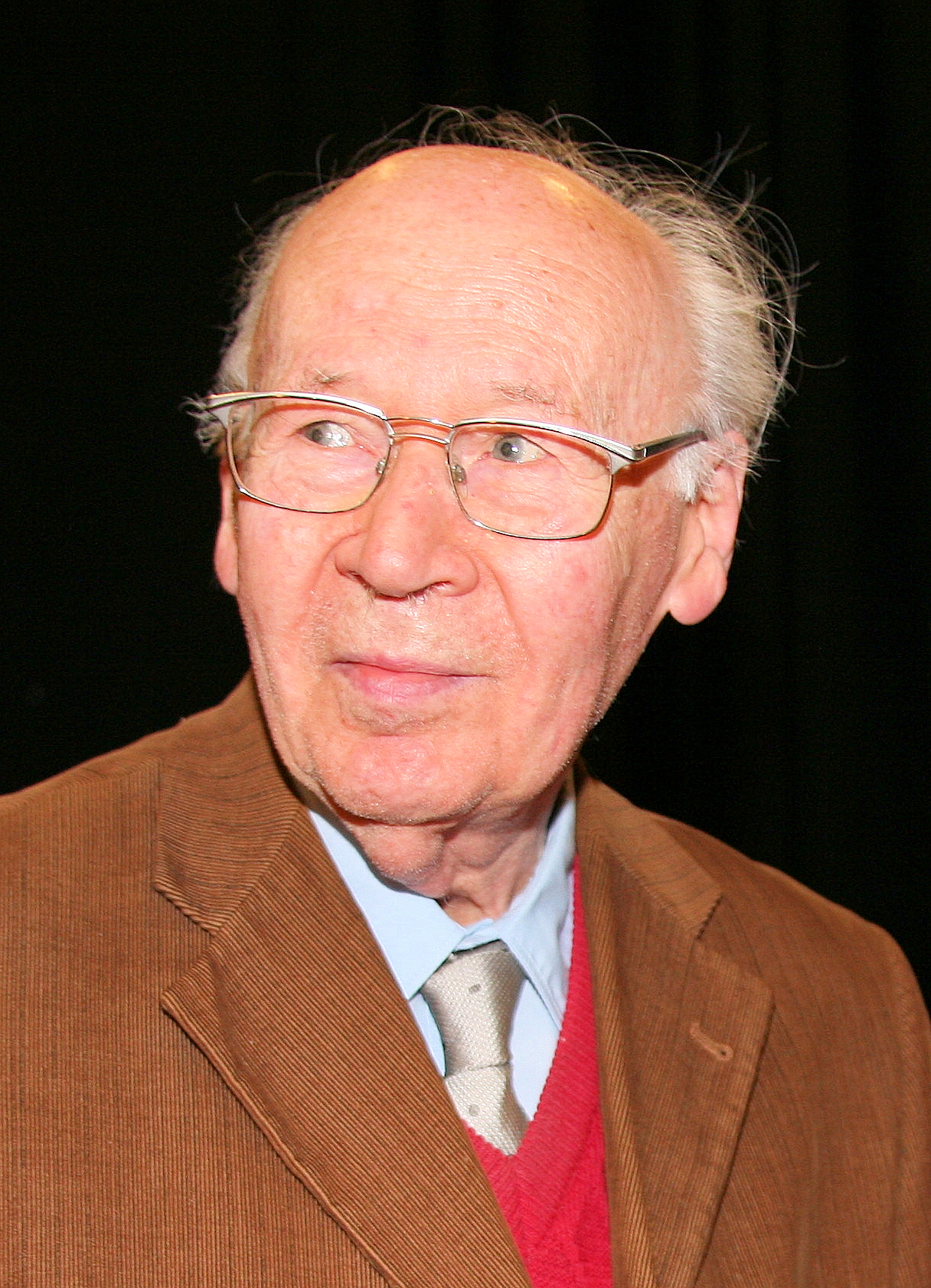
- Born: 10 December 1925; Parndorf, Austria
- Died: 23 July 2011 (aged 85)
- Education: University of Vienna
- Occupation: Historian

Jonny Moser (10 December 1925 – 23 July 2011) was an Austrian historian of the Holocaust and a survivor of the Holocaust.

== Life ==
Jonny Moser was the son of Jewish parents. Josef and Katharina Moser owned a general store in Burgenland at Parndorf which was the eastern end of Austria as remapped in 1919. Early in 1938 Austria was merged with Germany as part of Hitler's strategy for again redrawing the map of central Europe. Government policy for Burgenland now involved deporting the region's Jewish residents to Hungary. For the Moser family this meant, initially, some months spent under house arrest while their property was "aryanized" (expropriated by the state). They were then deported to Vienna where Jonny's father, Josef Moser, was again taken into custody by the Gestapo. In 1939 Josef was deported to the Hungarian capital, Budapest. Hungary was politically allied with Germany throughout this period, and Josef Moser was again interned. The next year, in October 1940, Katharina Moser and their son, Jonny were also able to transfer to Budapest and the family spent the next few years in a succession of Hungarian internment camps. In the summer of 1944 the family found themselves unexpectedly released, and presented in the Swedish legation of the diplomat Raoul Wallenberg. The Mosers were among those for whom Wallenberg organized "protective passports" after which they were accommodated in "protected houses". Johnny Moser was now employed in the "Relief Team" of Raoul Wallenberg.

After the war Jonny Moser studied History at the University of Vienna, later completing his doctoral dissertation on the subject of "Anti-Semitism in Austria". He published works on Nazi persecution of Jews in Austria.

Jonny Moser was a co-founder of the Documentation Centre of Austrian Resistance in Vienna. From 1964 he was a member of its governing board. Between 1964 and 1996 he sat on the District Council, representing the Social Democratic party in central Vienna's first District. He was on the board of the "Social Democratic Freedom Fighters" ("Sozialdemokratischen FreiheitskämpferInnen"), the Urania (an adult continuing education institution) and of the Association "Victims of Fascism and Active Anti-Fascists" ("Opfer des Faschismus und aktiver AntifaschistInnen").

His autobiography, entitled "Wallenbergs Laufbursche. Jugenderinnerungen 1938-1945" ("Wallenberg's errand boy: childhood memories 1938-1945") appeared in 2006.

== Recognition ==
In 2011 he received the honour of a "Bundesehren" award from the Austrian state, shared four ways with other freedom activists Gertrude Spieß, Hugo Pepper and Peter Weidner.

== Publications ==
- Die Judenverfolgung in Österreich. 1938–1945. Monographien zur Zeitgeschichte, Europa-Verlag, Wien 1966.
- Alex Colman: Vierzig Jahre geschwiegen. Überarbeitung von Jonny Moser, Materialien zur Zeitgeschichte - Band 4, Geyer-Edition, Wien 1985.
- with Wolfgang Neugebauer, Anton Steier: Auferstanden aus Ruinen. 40 Jahre SPÖ-Wien-Innere Stadt. 1945–1985. Sozialistische Partei Österreichs - Bezirksorganisation Innere Stadt, Wien 1988.
- Demographie der jüdischen Bevölkerung Österreichs 1938–1945. Dokumentationsarchiv des österreichischen Widerstandes, Wien 1999, ISBN 3-901142-42-8.
- Wallenbergs Laufbursche. Jugenderinnerungen 1938–1945. Autobiographie, Picus-Verlag, Wien 2006, ISBN 978-3-85452-615-5.
- Nisko. Die ersten Judendeportationen. Geschichte 1939, Joseph W. Moser und James R. Moser (Hrsg.), Ed. Steinbauer, Wien 2012.

== Book list ==
- Margit Craß: Dr. Jonny Moser 'Wallenbergs Laufbursche' und Historiker S. 56f. In: Burgenland. 90 Jahre – 90 Geschichten. Begleitband zur Ausstellung, Wissenschaftliche Arbeiten aus dem Burgenland (WAB) Band 137, Landesmuseum Burgenland, Eisenstadt 2011, ISBN 978-3-85405-180-0.
