= Jonny Chingas =

Mexican American musician (1940-1992)

Johnny Chingas
- Also known as: Raul Garcia, Rudy Garcia, Rulie Garcia
- Born: Raul Medina Garcia; 1939; Chihuahua, Mexico
- Died: March 1992 (aged 52–53)
- Occupation: Musician
- Labels: Billionaire Records, Dore
- Formerly of: Raul Garcia and Imperials, Garcia Brothers, Ruly Garcia Y Su Conjunto, Rulie Garcia And His Immigration, Brown Brothers Of Soul, Rulie Garcia And The East L.A. Congregation

Raul Garcia, better known by his stage name, Jonny Chingas (1939-1992), was a Mexican American musician known for his electronic and soul songs, such as "Se Me Paro".

== Career ==
Garcia was born in 1940 in Chihuahua, Mexico. He left Mexico in the 1950s, and shortly afterwards began his first band, Raul Garcia and Imperials. In the early 1970s he began his 2nd music career, as stagename Rulie Garcia

In 1980, he released his first album, No Hablo Ingles, along with his single "Se Me Paro". Chingas released his next album, Pachuco Volume 1, in 1981, and continued to release albums until the mid-1980s.

For the week of 26 May 1981, his song "I Want to Marry You" was one of the top add ons at radio KRTH (K-EARTH) in Los Angeles.

=== "Phone Home" ===
Chingas recorded the song "Phone Home" which was also written and produced by him. Backed with an instrumental version, it was released on CBS A3121. In the Disco Dealer section of UK music trade magazine, Record Business (24 January 1983 issue), Barry Lazell was writing about how they had just lost "E.T. Boogie", and in fron the United States comes Johnny Chingas with "Phone Home" which again obviously referred to the E.T. film. With the import action that had taken place over the last seven days, Lazell's advice was that CBS should get it turned around while the movie was still big news. Barry Lazell wrote in the 7 February issue of Record Business that there was good news for CBS who would "clean up" with the Johnny Chingas record. The record had also been in the magazine's Disco Top 50 for three weeks and had moved up from no. 18 to no. 10. It was also at its second week at no. 2 on the Dancefloor chart. The following week it had fallen back to no. 22 on the Disco Top 50, and no. 5 on the Dancefloor chart. It was also at no. 125 in the magazine's Bubbling Under Singles 101-150 chart. Also for that week, the song was still an add on at radio stations; Beacon where it was a hit pick, Capital where it was a climber, Luxembourg where it was a Power Play, and Victory where it was on the A List.

== After his career ==
Chingas' music was included on many Lowrider CDs, such as Lowrider Soundtrack Volume 1.

"Se Me Paro" (English: It Stood Up) is still very popular in the Lowrider community.

== Death ==
Following complications from diabetes, Garcia passed away at his home in Mission Hills, and was buried at the San Fernando Mission Cemetery. He was survived by his wife, four daughters, and two stepsons.
