= Brad Feldman =

American sports announcer

- Born: April 6, 1967 (age 59); Hanover, New Hampshire, USA
- Education: Johns Hopkins University (B.A.); Columbia University (M.S.); Northeastern University (M.B.A.)
- Occupations: Sportscaster and producer
- Known for: Announcer for New England Revolution
- Spouse: Elizabeth Graham
- Parent(s): Diane Feldman (mother); Joel J. Feldman (father)

Brad Feldman (born 1967) is an American television/radio announcer, radio personality, and broadcasting executive. He is the radio play-by-play announcer for the New England Revolution of Major League Soccer.

== Early life ==
Feldman was born in Hanover, New Hampshire on April 6, 1967. He is the son of artist Diane Feldman and Joel J. Feldman, a plastic surgeon who worked with burn victims and was Clinical Professor of Plastic Surgery at Harvard University. Brad Feldman attended Shady Hill School, in Cambridge, MA and graduated from Belmont Hill School. He earned his BA from the Johns Hopkins University, a master's degree from Columbia University Graduate School of Journalism and an MBA at Northeastern University.

== Broadcasting career ==
Feldman worked in television production in Los Angeles, then worked as a print news and sports reporter before moving into sports television production in New York City. Feldman launched his sportscasting career at TV stations in Texas, New York, and New Jersey. He first began covering professional soccer while working as a sideline reporter for Kansas City Wizards matches.

A TV and radio announcer on New England Revolution broadcasts since 2001, Feldman has been the play-by-play voice for Revolution radio and television broadcasts since 2005. He has also provided analysis and sideline reporting on Revolution telecasts from 2001 to 2004. A broadcast team member for the club's U.S. Open Cup and SuperLiga championship-winning matches Feldman was also a radio announcer for all five Revolution MLS Cup appearances.

Feldman hosted the online programs RevsWrap and In the Net, Revolution Postgame Live and State of the Revs on NBC Sports Boston and hosted the program Inside the Revolution on MyTV New England. He currently hosts the talk show Outside the Booth with Charlie Davies on revolutionsoccer.net and other digital platforms. He provided FIFA World Cup analysis for NBC Sports Boston and NECN in 2014 and ESPN Boston in 2010. Revolution broadcasts moved to WBZ-TV, WSBK-TV, and MyRITV in 2021.

=== Other networks and tournaments ===
Feldman worked for four seasons as a play-by-play commentator on ESPN International covering several top European soccer leagues. He also provided commentary for MLS, USL, WUSA, and college soccer games on Fox Soccer Channel and UEFA Champions League games on Setanta Sports.

In 2023, Feldman ceased announcing regional broadcasts of the New England Revolution matches when all Major League Soccer television broadcasts moved to Apple TV; Feldman continued as the Revolution’s play-by-play announcer for radio broadcasts on 98.5 the Sports Hub As of 2023, viewers had the option to switch the audio feed to Feldman’s local radio simulcast for home games.

== Business career ==
Feldman works as the Executive Producer for Kraft Sports + Entertainment's Revolution telecasts, and previously held several other titles in the Kraft organization's broadcasting and communications departments. Feldman also co-founded Sala USA, the American distributor of Munich futsal shoes, with former player Ilija Stolica.

== Personal life ==
Feldman lives in Massachusetts and is married to Elizabeth Graham. They have one daughter. Graham is the Chief Operating Officer at Indigo AG. Feldman served on advisory boards for Grassroot Soccer and the Kicking & Screening soccer film festival and participated in the March of the Living at Auschwitz in Poland with Revolution and Chelsea FC staff.
