= Jonny Lake =

Canadian chef

- Education: B.Sc Biology and Physics
- Spouse: Shannon Lake
- Children: Sadie, Rufus and Orla
- Culinary career
- Current restaurant(s): Trivet
- Previous restaurant(s): The Fat Duck

Jonny Lake is a Canadian chef who was the Executive Head Chef at The Fat Duck, a three Michelin starred restaurant in Bray, Berkshire for twelve years. In late 2019 he opened Trivet, a restaurant, wine bar and cellar with former Fat Duck master sommelier Isa Bal in the Snowsfields Yard development at London Bridge. Trivet has received two Michelin stars.

== Early life ==
Lake was born in Ontario and studied physics and biology at university in Montreal. He started cooking by volunteering at the meals-on-wheels charity, Santropol Roulant in Montreal, Quebec.

Lake had little interest in cooking during his youth, noting he '[did not] have that story of cooking beside [his] mum as a kid' and 'never really had an interest in it' until he was at university studying for his science degree. After deciding he 'wanted to take it further' Lake commenced a two year culinary program at Institut de Tourisme et d’Hôtellerie du Québec.

== Career ==
After completing culinary school, Lakes high performance led him to be granted a bursary. He used this grant to visit Italy for three months where in Savona, Liguria he worked at the one Michelin starred A-Spurcacciun-a. After a period of time he moved to work at the two Michelin starred restaurant owned by Gultiero Marchesi in Erbusco.

Lake moved to the UK in 2005 to join The Fat Duck, initially as chef de partie and was subsequently made Executive Head Chef of The Fat Duck Group. In 2015, Lake aided in migrating the Fat Duck to Melbourne. He departed the restaurant in 2018 to pursue personal projects and collaborate on a new restaurant project with master sommelier Isa Bal. The pair opened Trivet in late 2019.

Trivet was awarded its first Michelin star in February 2022 and a second star followed in February 2024.

== Personal life ==
Lake is married. He and his wife Shannon have three children, Sadie, Rufus, and Orla.
