= Jonny Pula =

Motswana comedian and actor

- Born: Kago Rannoba
- Citizenship: Botswana
- Education: Limkokwing University of Creative Technology; Kimberley Boys' High School
- Years active: 2011–present
- Known for: Co-founder of Gaborone Comedy Club; Jonny Pula and Triccs Show

Jonny Pula (also referred to as Kago "Jonny Pula" Rannoba) is a Motswana comedian, actor, and comedy writer. He is a co-founder of the Gaborone Comedy Club and a co-creator of The Jonny Pula and Triccs Show, an online comedy programme. He has also appeared in the 2023 short film Zombie Date Night in Tlokweng.

== Early life and education ==
Pula was born in Orapa, Botswana. He attended Kimberley Boys' High School in South Africa before studying architectural technology at Limkokwing University of Creative Technology and worked for more than five years before pursuing comedy full-time.

== Career ==
Pula began writing jokes in 2011 and started performing stand-up comedy in 2014. He transitioned into comedy full-time in 2020. He performed stand-up comedy through open mic events and later expanded into writing, production, and digital content creation. He has also worked in graphic design, photography, and cinematography.

He has been described in published coverage as part of Botswana's stand-up comedy scene, performing at platforms such as Comedy Factory Botswana and Phakalane Comedy Night, as well as other live comedy events in Gaborone.

In 2022, Pula was reported as one of the founders of the Gaborone Comedy Club, alongside Bambino, Baldwin Bals, and Triccs. The club has been described as a platform that mentors comedians and hosts performances, including appearances by international acts.

Pula is also associated with The Jonny Pula and Triccs Show, an online comedy programme which launched its second season in 2021. The show features comedy segments written and directed by Pula and Triccs.

He has been involved in the development of sketch comedy content, including collaborative writing and production processes for digital comedy programmes.

== Film ==
Pula appeared in the Botswana horror-comedy short film Zombie Date Night in Tlokweng, which premiered at the Durban FilmMart in July 2023. The film later received the NEFTI Competition Best Film Award and the Audience Choice Award.

== Selected works ==
- The Jonny Pula and Triccs Show (online comedy programme)
- Zombie Date Night in Tlokweng (short film, 2023)
