= Joni (surname) =

Joni or Al-Joni, or Al-Jouni is a surname. Notable people with the surname include:

- Aiedh Al-Joni (born 1988), Saudi football midfielder
- Fuad Issa al-Jouni, Syrian politician
- Mei Joni (born 1989), Indonesian basketball shooting guard and small forward
- Saj-nicole A. Joni, American mathematician, author, and business consultant
