= Jonny Miller =

American sportscaster (born 1949)

- Born: June 13, 1949 (age 77)
- Education: Boston University
- Occupation: Radio sportscaster
- Known for: Commentating on the Boston Red Sox for WBZ-FM

Jonny Miller (born June 13, 1949) is an American former radio sports commentator and Boston Red Sox historian. He covered the Red Sox for 54 years.

== Early life ==
Miller, who was born with cerebral palsy, grew up in a Jewish family in Newton, Massachusetts, in the 1950s. He attended Franklin Elementary School and Bigelow Junior High School in Newton; for religion, he was a member of Congregation Mishkan Tefil in Chestnut Hill. An avid Boston Red Sox fan, he went to his first opener in 1958. He became a fan of the club's announcers Curt Gowdy and Bob Murphy, while his idol is Sid Hartman, a former columnist for the Star Tribune in Minneapolis.

== Career ==
Miller graduated from Boston University in 1972, shortly after which he began working for WBZ-FM. Aside from his work with the Red Sox, he also covered the Boston Celtics in the 1980s and the New England Patriots in the 1990s.

He retired after a health setback during spring training of 2024.

== Personal life ==
Miller had back surgery in 2005. He suffered a stroke during the 2018 World Series. The plane he was traveling on, en route to Los Angeles, was diverted to Colorado to expedite the medical attention he needed. He returned to work the following year. Later in 2018, Miller was inducted into the Massachusetts Broadcasters Hall of Fame.

In August 2015, Miller purchased an advertisement in the Boston Globe to honor former Boston Herald columnist Tim Horgan, who died three months previously. It read: "Tim Horgan 1927–2015. Just Pure Class."

On his 77th birthday in 2026, Miller was a guest in the press box at Fenway Park as the Red Sox hosted the Texas Rangers.
