= Jonni Hansen =

Danish politician

Leader of the National Socialist Movement of Denmark
- In office September 1st, 1991 – October 2010
- Preceded by: Position established
- Succeeded by: Esben Rohde Kristensen

Personal details
- Born: September 5, 1965 (age 60) Denmark

Jonni Hansen (born 5 September 1965) is the former chairman of Denmark's National Socialist Movement (DNSB), of which he has been a member since 1985. He is also editor of DNSB Intern and the online newsletter Nationalsocialisten.

== Political career ==
He stood as the only candidate in the regional and municipal elections in 2005 in Greve Municipality and Region Zealand for Denmark's National Socialist Movement on list Å. In the election campaign, he campaigned for several important issues.

Jonni Hansen's list Å obtained 73 votes (0.3%) in the municipal election. In the regional election, list Å received 611 votes, of which 453 voted personally for Jonni Hansen (0.1% of the votes in the region).

== Confrontations with the authorities ==
On March 29, 2000, Jonni Hansen was sentenced to one year in prison for serious violence and a two-year suspension of his driver's license for three months earlier having driven his car directly into a group of protesters who were sawing down the fence in front of his villa in Greve, where the DNSB exists. One of the protesters was seriously injured. Jonni Hansen appealed the sentence to the Eastern High Court, which increased the sentence to 1.5 years in prison.

In connection with holding a demonstration in Kolding for Adolf Hitler's deputy Rudolf Hess on the 20th anniversary of his death, August 17, 2007, Jonni Hansen was arrested and charged with violence against the police. He was subsequently remanded in custody until 30 August. On 1 November, he was sentenced to 60 days in prison for the offense - he asked for time to think about whether to appeal the sentence.

On 11 October 2009, Jonni Hansen was charged with racism by the Attorney General. The accusation was that he, as chairman of DNSB, was responsible for the distribution of racist leaflets in Gladsaxe and Bagsværd in October and November 2006 respectively, and that these had been available on DNSB's website. Furthermore, the Attorney General considered it an aggravating circumstance, calling it propaganda. The leaflets with the headline "Denmark – wake up!", among other things, called for throwing out "the foreigners". Jonni Hansen stated to BT.dk that the accusation was an attempt to restrict freedom of expression, and that he was prepared to take the case to the Supreme Court.

In April 2010, Jonni Hansen was indicted for violating the hate speech laws, as he was responsible for the content of some Nazi leaflets and for racist propaganda. He was summoned to a hearing at the court in Roskilde on Tuesday, the 13th of April 2010, accused of carrying out racist propaganda - with a demand for 4 months in prison, but was acquitted.
