= WBZ-FM =

Sports radio station in Boston

- Boston, Massachusetts; United States
- Broadcast area: Greater Boston
- Frequency: 98.5 MHz (HD Radio)
- Branding: 98.5 The Sports Hub

Programming
- Format: Sports radio
- Subchannels: HD2: "Hubcast" (Sports radio)
- Network: Fox Sports Radio
- Affiliations: Boston Bruins; Boston Celtics; New England Patriots; New England Revolution; Northeastern Huskies

Ownership
- Owner: Beasley Broadcast Group; (Beasley Media Group Licenses, LLC)
- Sister stations: WBOS; WBQT; WKLB-FM; WRCA; WROR-FM

History
- First air date: October 1948
- Former call signs: WNAC-FM (1948–1957); WRKO-FM (1957–1968); WROR (1968–1991); WBMX (1991–2009)
- Call sign meaning: from former sister station WBZ (AM)

Technical information
- Licensing authority: FCC
- Facility ID: 1901
- Class: B
- ERP: 9,000 watts
- HAAT: 349 meters (1,145 ft)
- Transmitter coordinates: 42°18′27.3″N 71°13′25.1″W

Links
- Public license information: Public file; LMS
- Webcast: Listen live; Listen live (via TuneIn)
- Website: 985thesportshub.com

WBZ-FM (98.5 FM) is a commercial sports radio station licensed to Boston, Massachusetts, serving Greater Boston and much of surrounding New England. Owned by the Beasley Broadcast Group, WBZ-FM is the Boston affiliate for Fox Sports Radio; the flagship station for the New England Patriots, Boston Bruins, Boston Celtics, and New England Revolution radio networks; and the radio home of Fred Toettcher, Scott Zolak, Mike Felger, Tony Massarotti, and Bob Socci. The WBZ-FM studios are located in Waltham, while the station transmitter resides in the Boston suburb of Newton. In addition to a standard analog transmission, WBZ-FM broadcasts over two HD Radio channels, and is available online.

Despite the call sign, WBZ-FM has no connection to either WBZ-TV or WBZ (AM): WBZ-TV owner Paramount Skydance, through CBS Mass Media Corp., holds the trademark for "WBZ" and has licensed the rights to the WBZ call letters to Beasley under a long-term agreement that followed CBS Corporation's divestiture of CBS Radio, WBZ-FM's previous owner, to Audacy.

== History ==
=== WNAC-FM (1948–1957) ===
The station signed on in October 1948 as WNAC-FM under the ownership of the Yankee Network division of General Tire and Rubber, which also owned WNAC (1260 AM) and WNAC-TV (channel 7, now occupied by WHDH). The station originally transmitted from WNAC-TV's tower in Medford, using a transmitter originally used for WMNE, the Yankee Network's FM station on Mount Washington (which was originally considered a Boston station, but was eventually refocused to Portland, Maine), which operated from December 18, 1940, to September 1948 (when it signed off due to increasing costs and a lack of listener interest). As at most FM stations, WNAC-FM initially served as a full-time simulcast of WNAC.

The station, along with General Tire's other broadcast holdings, came under the General Teleradio banner in 1952; the division became RKO Teleradio Pictures in 1955 and RKO General by December 1959.

In May 1953, General Teleradio bought WLAW (680 AM) and WLAW-FM 93.7 from Hildreth and Rogers, publishers of the Lawrence Daily Eagle and Evening Tribune, for $475,000. The deal was made to facilitate a "move" of the WNAC call letters and programming onto WLAW's signal as WNAC (680 AM); to comply with existing FCC ownership regulations, the 1260 AM license was spun off to Vic Diehm and Associates and became WVDA. WLAW-FM had its license surrendered in the transaction, as WNAC-FM was retained.

=== WRKO-FM (1957–1968) ===
On May 10, 1957, the call sign was changed to WRKO-FM, even though the station was still simulcasting WNAC, as RKO Teleradio sought to keep the WRKO call letters out of the hands of its competitors. While separate programming was inaugurated for half of the broadcast day in 1963 due to then-upcoming Federal Communications Commission (FCC) regulations prohibiting AM and FM stations from simulcasting for more than half of the day, this programming was initially a middle-of-the-road format identical to that of WNAC. A year later, WRKO-FM, along with WNAC-TV, moved to a new tower in Newton.

On October 12, 1966, WRKO-FM dropped its simulcast of WNAC (by then predominantly a talk station) and introduced a top 40 format reliant on automation. Playing the top hits of the day (including the number-one song in Boston every hour on the hour) and using recorded announcing altered to sound like a robot (since the station was positioned as "R-KO [pronounced "arko"], The Shy But Friendly Robot"), WRKO-FM quickly became the most popular FM radio station in the Boston area. As a result of this success, when WNAC dropped its talk format in favor of a live top 40 format on March 13, 1967, RKO General changed its call letters to WRKO. Its programming was then simulcast on WRKO-FM from 6:00 a.m. to 6:00 p.m., with the "R-KO" programming continuing for the rest of the day.

=== WROR (1968–1991) ===
WRKO-FM's top 40 programming came to an end in November 1968, when it joined sister stations KHJ-FM in Los Angeles and KFRC-FM in San Francisco in airing an automated soft rock format from Drake-Chenault Enterprises, "Hit Parade '68", which incorporated both current music and oldies. A month earlier, on October 4, the station changed its call sign to WROR, as part an effort by RKO General to give their FM stations a distinct identity from their AM sister stations. WROR switched to another Drake-Chenault format, "Solid Gold Rock and Roll", on November 1, 1970, evenly splitting the oldies and current music.

RKO General reached a tentative deal to sell off WROR to Cecil Heftel and his wife, Joyce Heftel, for $2 million in August 1972. While approved by the FCC, the agency concurrently rejected a secondary agreement between Heftel and the Boston Community Media Committee (BCMC), whereupon Heftel would make programming and minority-employment commitments for WROR, in exchange for an annual payment to the BCMC of $1,000, or 1% of WROR's before-tax profits, whichever was greater. The BCMC and another Boston citizens-group opposed to the transaction subsequently filed challenges that led to a lengthy delay, resulting in RKO and Heftel mutually agreeing to terminate the sale.

In early 1973, WROR went to a full-time oldies format (still playing a new song per hour and a couple recent hits an hour), eventually parting ways with Drake-Chenault later that year and adopting the name "The Golden Great 98" (Drake-Chenault's services were later utilized by WCOP-FM, now WZLX, which competed with WROR in the oldies format from 1973 to 1974). Starting in March 1977, WROR gradually began to position the station as an adult contemporary station rather than oldies, and by September 1978 was more of a gold based adult contemporary station, leading to its branding changing to "The Great 98" and then "98-and-a-half". Station management felt that there was a hole in the market for an FM AC station to compete against WBZ and WHDH (now WEEI). The station continued to focus on oldies from the 1960s, playing a couple currents and a couple recent hits an hour plus a couple of pre-1964 oldies.

After RKO General lost its license to operate WNAC-TV in 1982, WROR was forced to move to another tower in Newton, as the new owners of channel 7 (renamed WNEV-TV) did not lease space on its tower. However, in the wake of the loss of the license, the FCC announced in February 1983 that it would solicit competing applications for RKO's remaining stations, including WROR. Finally, FCC administrative law judge Edward Kuhlmann ruled on August 11, 1987, that WROR's license, along with all of RKO General's broadcast licenses, be denied renewal; while parent company Gencorp initially appealed the ruling, the company was advised by the FCC that any appeal would be denied, and that to avoid the indignity of further license forfeitures without compensation, their stations should be divested instead. In 1988, the station, along with WRKO, was acquired by Atlantic Ventures for $27.7 million, split between Gencorp and the challengers for the licenses.

During the 1980s, WROR continued as a gold-based AC station throughout the week. The station played one to two currents an hour that were huge hits. They played several 1980s songs an hour, and several 1970s songs an hour. Nearly half the songs played were from the 1960s along with a pre-1964 oldie an hour. On weekends, the station played strictly oldies mostly from the 1960s with a couple of early 1970s songs an hour, plus several pre-1964 oldies as well. For a few months late in 1987 and early in 1988, WROR ran a smooth jazz/new-age music show in the evening. In 1989, WROR modified its oldies/AC format to "bright adult contemporary" and changed its on-air identity to "ROR-FM". The station discontinued the oldies weekends, began playing more currents, eliminated nearly all pre-1964 oldies, and focused on 1970s and 1980s music; despite these changes, WROR continued to air its Saturday night oldies show. However, after finding that listeners continued to perceive WROR as an oldies station, Atlantic Ventures decided to relaunch the station under a new identity.

=== WBMX (1991–2009) ===
At noon on February 8, 1991, after playing a WROR top-of-the-hour cut from JAM Creative Productions followed by Roy Orbison's "It's Over", the station became "Mix 98.5" and shifted closer to a rhythmic-leaning hot adult contemporary format heavy on Motown oldies and hot AC currents. A few weeks later, on February 26, 1991, the station took the WBMX call letters from an AM station in Zeeland, Michigan, which had been using them since signing on the previous year; this AM station received the WROR calls in return. Barry Scott and The Lost 45s retro radio show was a Sunday night staple, before moving to WODS. (The WROR-FM call letters are now used on a classic hits station in Boston at 105.7 FM, owned by Beasley Broadcast Group).

Atlantic Ventures merged with two other radio groups, Stoner Broadcasting Systems and Multi Market Communications, on June 5, 1993, to form American Radio Systems (ARS). In the following years, like many hot AC stations, WBMX began to emphasize more modern rock music to the exclusion of the remaining oldies, and was considered one of the first modern adult contemporary stations in the country.

American Radio Systems announced a merger with CBS Radio in 1997. WBMX was the company's only Boston station to be acquired by CBS in the deal, completed in June 1998, owing to CBS's existing presence in the market; ARS' other Boston stations were required to be sold off by either the FCC or the Department of Justice (DOJ). CBS's radio stations, including WBMX, were spun off into a new public company, Infinity Broadcasting Corporation, in late 1998; Viacom announced its acquisition of the publicly held stake in Infinity on August 15, 2000 (shortly after it merged with CBS Corporation), a transaction completed on February 21, 2001 (though Viacom, and CBS before the merger, had always held a majority stake in Infinity). When Viacom split into two companies on December 31, 2005, Infinity became part of the new CBS Corporation and reverted to the CBS Radio name.

=== WBZ-FM (2009–present) ===
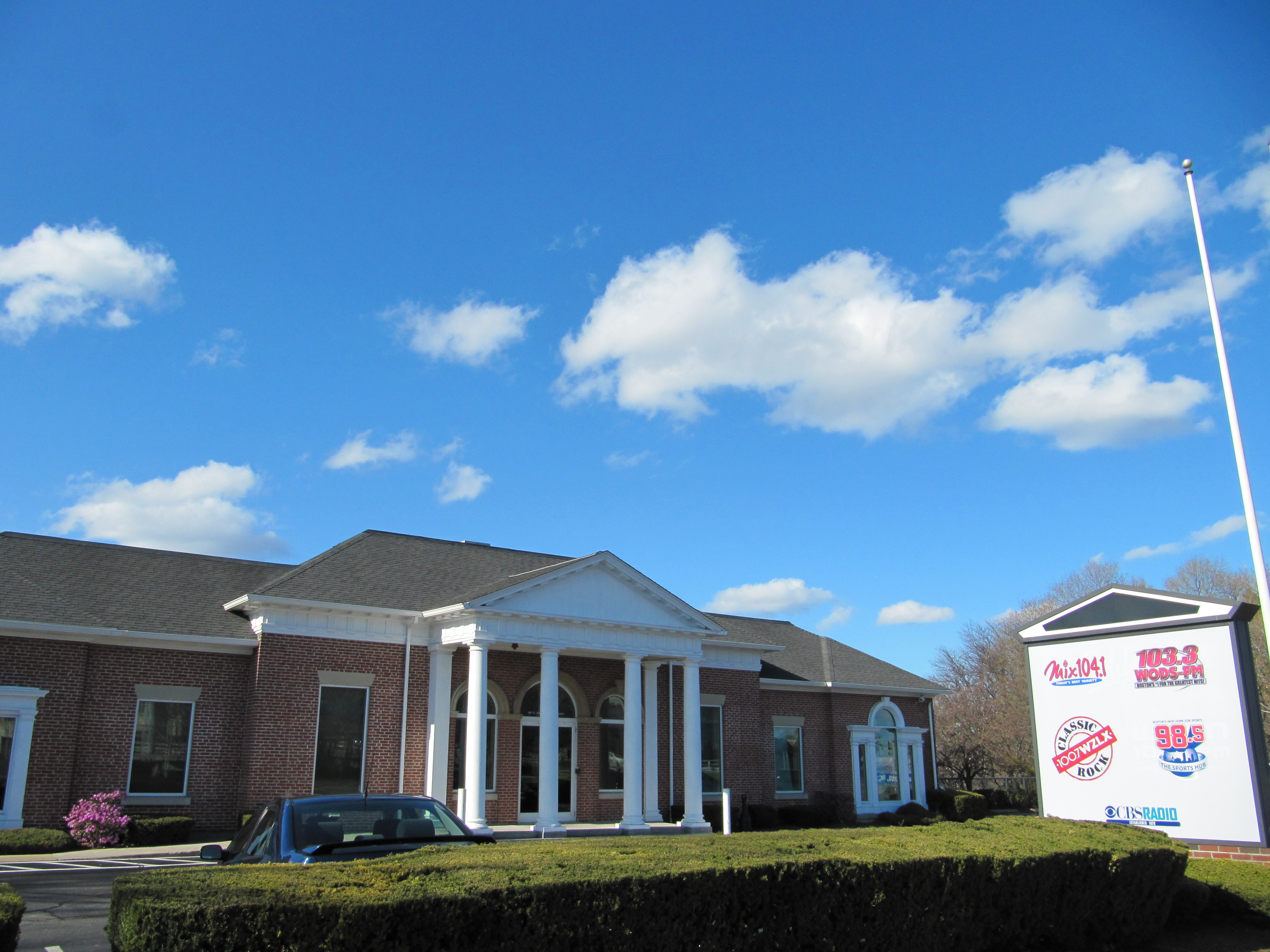
WBZ-FM's former studios in Brighton shared with CBS's other Boston FM stations prior to 2017. The building previously housed WSBK-TV.

On July 14, 2009, CBS Radio announced that it would change WBMX's format to sports radio, under the "98.5 The Sports Hub" branding, and change call letters to WBZ-FM; this would be the third distinct usage of the WBZ calls on the FM dial in Boston, having previously been used on an early FM station from 1943 to 1954, and again on the current WMJX from 1957 to 1981. In addition, CBS announced that the WBMX call letters, hot AC format, and "Mix" branding and intellectual properties would move to 104.1 FM as "Mix 104.1", replacing WBCN, on August 12, 2009. The next day, the sports talk format officially launched on 98.5.

Ahead of the changes, WBMX added an "-FM" suffix to its call sign on July 29, 2009, allowing CBS to place the call sign on an AM station it owned in Charlotte, North Carolina; 98.5 then changed to WBZ-FM on August 5, 2009, a week before the launch of "The Sports Hub". WBCN's active rock format was re-established on an HD Radio subchannel of WBZ-FM, branded as "WBCN"; its call sign was "parked" on the Charlotte station in a swap with 104.1.

With the sports format's launch, WBZ-FM became the flagship for the Boston Bruins Radio Network, taking those duties from WBZ; in addition to becoming the flagship for the New England Patriots Radio Network, assuming those play-by-play rights from the former WBCN; WBCN's morning show, Toucher and Rich, was also moved over to WBZ-FM in the same time slot. Within two years of WBZ-FM's launch, "The Sports Hub" outrated WEEI (850 AM), the established sports station in the Boston market, in three key male demographics; this led WEEI's owner, Entercom, to move its programming to 93.7 FM in September 2011.

On February 2, 2017, CBS announced that they would be selling their radio division to Entercom, which could have made WBZ-FM a direct sister to WEEI. The sale would be conducted using a Reverse Morris Trust so that it would be tax-free. While CBS shareholders retained a 72% ownership stake in the combined company, Entercom was the surviving entity, separating both WBZ and WBZ-FM from WBZ-TV and WSBK-TV. However, the combined company would have to shed some of its Boston stations in order to satisfy FCC and DOJ requirements. On October 10, 2017, CBS disclosed that as part of the process of obtaining regulatory approval of the merger, WBZ-FM would be one of sixteen stations that would be divested by Entercom, along with sister stations WBZ and WZLX, and Entercom stations WRKO and WKAF, with Entercom retaining WEEI AM and FM, WBMX, WODS, and WAAF. On November 1, 2017, Beasley Media Group announced that it would trade WMJX to Entercom, in exchange for WBZ-FM (WBZ, WZLX, WRKO, and WKAF were acquired by iHeartMedia). The CBS Radio/Entercom merger was approved on November 9, 2017, and was consummated on November 17. Beasley took complete ownership of the station on December 20, 2017.

== Current programming ==
The bulk of the weekday lineup features local hosts such as Fred "Toucher" Toettcher and Rob "Hardy" Poole, who host the morning drive program Toucher & Hardy; Scott Zolak and Marc Bertrand, who host the midday program Zolak & Bertrand; Mike Felger and Tony Massarotti, who host Felger & Massarotti afternoons; and presently Joe Murray evenings. Local hosts including "Big" Jim Murray, Chris Gasper, Alex Barth, and Cerrone Battle are heard on weekends.

Fox Sports Radio programming airs overnights during the week, on weekends and on holidays.

=== Play-by-play ===
WBZ-FM has served as the flagship station for the major Boston/New England professional sports teams, including: the New England Patriots Radio Network since 2009; the Boston Bruins Radio Network since 2009; the Boston Celtics Radio Network since 2013; and the New England Revolution Radio Network since 2009; select Celtics games air on WROR-FM in the event of any schedule conflict, while select Bruins games air on WKLB-FM in the event that they conflict with Patriots games.

- For Patriots Radio, play-by-play announcers Bob Socci and Scott Zolak call games on-site. Marc Bertrand and Chris Gasper host the network pregame show, Bertrand hosts the halftime show, and is teamed up with Jim Murray for the network postgame show.
- For Bruins Radio, on-site, play-by-play announcer Ryan Johnston calls games alongside color analyst Bob Beers, a former Bruins defenceman.
- For Celtics Radio, on-site, play-by-play announcer Sean Grande calls games alongside color analyst Cedric Maxwell, a former Celtics small forward; Jon Wallach also serves as a fill-in announcer.
- For Revolution Radio, play-by-play announcer Brad Feldman and color commentator Charlie Davies call games on-site.

WBZ-FM's play-by-play broadcasts are generally limited to the over-the-air FM broadcast. Streaming of game broadcasts by the station is limited to the Boston radio market; outside of the market, game coverage must be listened to through a league's audio portal or SiriusXM.

==== Former staff ====
- Damon Amendolara
- Christian Arcand
- Gino Cappelletti
- Crash Clark
- Andy Gresh
- Dave Goucher
- Adam Jones
- Rich Keefe
- Paul Mariner
- Jonny Miller
- Chuck Perks
- Gil Santos
- Rich Shertenlieb
- Judd Sirott
- Gary Tanguay

== See also ==
- List of three-letter broadcast call signs in the United States
