= Joni =

Joni may refer to:

- Joni (given name), unisex given name
- Joni (surname)
- Joni (footballer) (born 1970), Angolan footballer, real name Osvaldo Roque Gonçalves da Cruz
- Joni (film), a biographical film about Joni Eareckson Tada
- List of storms named Joni
- Joni's Promise, a film directed by Joko Anwar
- "Joni" (song), a song by SZA featuring Don Toliver from the extended version of Lana (2025)

== See also ==
- Joani, given name
