= Kevin Johnn =

American fashion designer

Kevin Johnn is American fashion designer. He was one of the original designers of Project Runway on Bravo. He also appeared on the Axis Networks reality show Club Kids (2013-2014).

== Project Runway ==
He appeared and starred on the hit Bravo Emmy nominated show Project Runway. Kevin Johnn won the challenge "Rockstar" and had his outfit worn by Sarah Hudson in her music video, Girl on the Verge and dressed Heidi Klum for the second season of Project Runway.

== Career ==
Kevin Johnn resides in New York, New York, and is currently CFO/Creative Director of his own brand Kevin Johnn, a collection of luxury fashion sophisticated dresses and gowns. And of the dress line I Love Kevin Johnn clothing & accessories line based in New York City.
