= Johny =

Johny is a masculine given name which may refer to:

- Johny Borges Braga (born 1972), confidential French writer and poet
- Johny Fritz (born 1944), Luxembourgish composer
- Johny Hendricks (born 1983), American mixed martial artist
- Johny Joseph (civil servant) (born 1952), Municipal Commissioner of Mumbai
- Johny Lahure (1942–2003), Luxembourg politician
- Johny Pitts, English television presenter
- Johny Schleck (born 1942), Luxembourg racing cyclist
- Johny, a character in the nursery rhyme "Johny Johny Yes Papa"

== See also ==
- Johnny, a more common given name
- John (disambiguation)
- Johny (disambiguation)
- Johny Mera Naam
