= Johnny and Jonie Mosby =

American country music duo

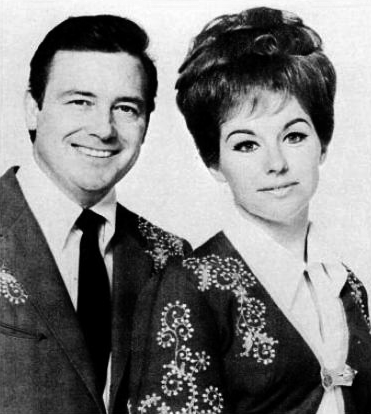
- The duo in 1970

Background information
- Origin: U.S.
- Genres: Country
- Years active: 1963–1973
- Labels: Columbia; Starday; Capitol
- Past members: Johnny Mosby; Jonie Mosby

Johnny and Jonie Mosby was an American husband-and-wife country music vocal duo. They placed seventeen singles on the country music charts between 1963 and 1973, and released six albums for various labels. Five of the duo's singles made top 20 on the Hot Country Songs charts, with the highest peaks being "Trouble in My Arms" and "Just Hold My Hand", both at number twelve.

== Biography ==
John Robert "Johnny" Mosby (born in Fort Smith, Arkansas; April 26, 1929 – February 19, 2018) and Janice Irene "Jonie" Shields (born in Van Nuys, California on August 10, 1940) met in California when she auditioned for his orchestra. They married in 1958. They started recording for Challenge records that same year. In 1959, they made the first recording of "Tijuana Jail".

Signed to Columbia Records, the duo released its debut single, "Don't Call Me from a Honky Tonk", in 1963. It went to number thirteen on the country music charts and was followed by another Top 20 hit, the number twelve "Trouble in My Arms". By 1965, the duo released Mr. and Mrs. Country Music through Columbia, followed by The New Sweethearts of Country on the Starday Records label.

From 1967 to 1972, the Mosbys recorded for Capitol Records, reaching top 20 again with "Just Hold My Hand" and "I'm Leavin' It Up to You" at numbers twelve and eighteen. In the same timespan, the duo recorded several albums for the label. In 1971, Jonie released a solo single, "I've Been There", which peaked at number 72 on the country charts. They filed for divorce in 1973.

In 1992 at age 52, Jonie Mosby became the oldest woman to have a baby through in vitro fertilization as she gave birth to a son Morgan Bradford Mitchell by second husband, Donald Mitchell.

Johnny Mosby died on February 19, 2018, at age 88.

== Discography ==
=== Albums ===
| Year | Album details | Peak chart positions | |
| Year | Album details | US Country | US |
|---|---|---|---|
| 1965 | Mr. and Mrs. Country Music: Label: Columbia Records | 18 | — |
| 1965 | The New Sweethearts of Country Music: Label: Starday Records | — | — |
| 1968 | Make a Left and Then a Right: Label: Capitol Records | — | — |
| 1969 | Just Hold My Hand: Label: Capitol Records | 41 | — |
| 1969 | Hold Me: Label: Capitol Records | 33 | 197 |
| 1969 | I'll Never Be Free: Label: Capitol Records | — | — |
| 1970 | My Happiness: Label: Capitol Records | — | — |

=== Singles ===
| Year | Single | Chart Positions | Album |
| Year | Single | US Country | Album |
|---|---|---|---|
| 1963 | "Don't Call Me from a Honky Tonk" | 13 | Mr. and Mrs. Country Music |
| 1963 | "Trouble in My Arms" | 12 | Mr. and Mrs. Country Music |
| 1963 | "Who's Been Cheatin' Who"^{[A]} | 27 | Mr. and Mrs. Country Music |
| 1964 | "Keep Those Cards and Letters Coming In" | 16 | Mr. and Mrs. Country Music |
| 1964 | "How the Other Half Lives" | 21 | Mr. and Mrs. Country Music |
| 1967 | "Make a Left and Then a Right" | 36 | Make a Left and Then a Right |
| 1968 | "Mr. and Mrs. John Smith" | 53 | Make a Left and Then a Right |
| 1968 | "Our Golden Wedding Day" | 68 | Just Hold My Hand |
| 1969 | "Just Hold My Hand" | 12 | Just Hold My Hand |
| 1969 | "Hold Me, Thrill Me, Kiss Me" | 38 | Hold Me |
| 1969 | "I'll Never Be Free" | 26 | I'll Never Be Free |
| 1970 | "Third World" | 34 | My Happiness |
| 1970 | "I'm Leavin' It Up to You"^{[B]} | 18 | My Happiness |
| 1970 | "My Happiness" | 47 | My Happiness |
| 1971 | "Oh, Love of Mine" | 41 | non-album singles |
| 1971 | "Just One More Time" | 70 | non-album singles |
| 1973 | "I've Been There" (Jonie Mosby) | 72 | non-album singles |

Notes

- A B-side to "Trouble in My Arms".
- B Peaked at No. 21 on RPM Country Tracks.
