= Johnny =

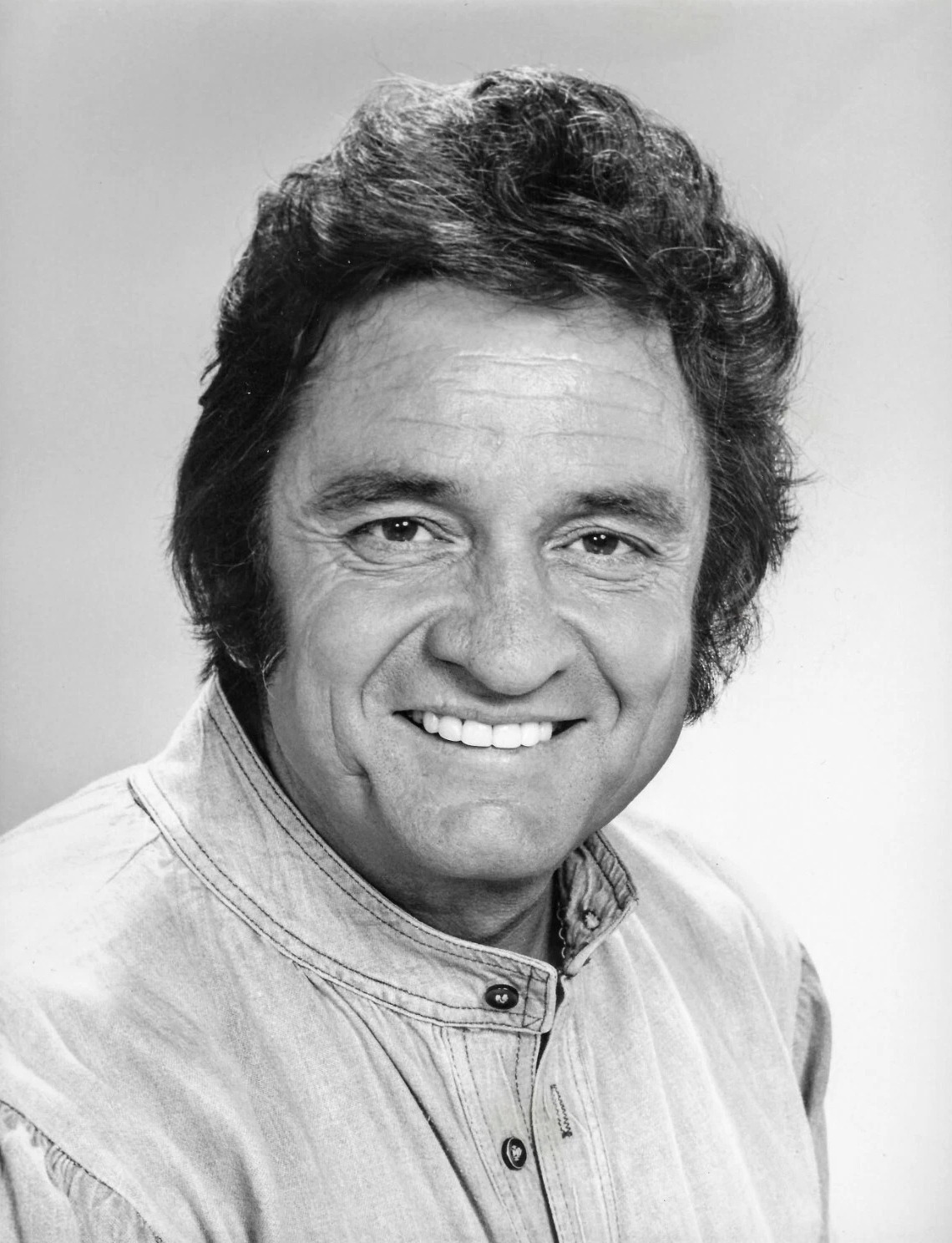
- Johnny Cash in 1979
- Pronunciation: /ˈdʒɒn.i/ JON-ee
- Gender: Male
- Language: English

Origin
- Languages: 1. Hebrew; 2. English
- Origin: Diminutive form of John
- Region of origin: English-speaking world

Other names
- Alternative spelling: Johnnie; Johnni; Johnney; Johni; Jhonny; Johny; Jonny
- Related names: John, Johnathan, Johnathon, Johnson, Jonny, Juanito, Sonny
- See also: Seonaidh

Johnny is an English language personal name. It is often a nickname, but from the 16th century it has sometimes been a given name in its own right for males and, less commonly, females.

Variant forms of Johnny include Johnnie, Johnney, Johhny, Johnni and Johni. The masculine Johnny can be rendered into Scottish Gaelic as Seonaidh.

Notable people and characters named Johnny or Johnnie include:

== People ==
=== Johnny ===
- Johnny (born 1995), American musician and member of NCT
- Johnny 3 Tears (born 1981), American musician
- Johnny Adams (1932–1998), American singer
- Johnny Aba (born 1956), Papua New Guinean professional boxer
- Johnny Abarrientos (born 1970), Filipino professional basketball player
- Johnny Abbes García (1924–1967), chief of the government intelligence office of the Dominican Republic
- Johnny Abel (1947–1995), Canadian politician
- Johnny Abrego (born 1962), former Major League baseball player
- Johnny Ace (1929–1954), American rhythm and blues singer
- Johnny Adair (born 1963), loyalist paramilitary leader in Northern Ireland
- Johnny Anderson (racing driver) (born 1942), American racing driver
- Johnny Anfone (born 1969), Thai actor, singer and model
- Johnny Appleseed (1774–1845), American pioneer nurseryman
- Johnny Archer (born 1968), American pool player
- Johnny Bench (born 1947), American baseball player
- Johnny Yong Bosch (born 1976), actor and martial artist
- Johnny Boychuk (born 1984), Canadian ice hockey player
- Johnny Brackins (born 2003), American long jumper
- Johnny Bristol (1939–2004), American musician
- Johnny Burke (lyricist) (1908–1964), American lyricist
- Johnny Cardoso (born 2001), American soccer player
- Johnny Carson (1925–2005), American talk show host
- Johnny Cash (1932–2003), American singer-songwriter and actor
- Johnny Cochrane, Scottish football manager
- Johnny Cook (Canadian football) (1925–1986), American football player
- Johnny Crawford (1946–2021), American actor, singer and musician
- Johnny Davis (kickboxer) (born 1962), American kickboxer
- Johnny Depp (born 1963), American actor, film producer, and musician
- Johnny Dawes (1955–1989), American actor, filmmaker, and model
- Johnny Diaz, American writer
- Johnny Flynn (born 1982), British musician, singer-songwriter and actor
- Johnny Franz (1922–1977), English record producer
- Johnny Galecki (born 1975), American actor
- Johnny Gargano (born 1987), American professional wrestler
- Johnny Gaudreau (1993–2024), American ice hockey player
- Johnny Gilbert (born 1924), American TV personality
- Johnny Gioeli (born 1967), American singer-songwriter
- Johnny Hallyday (1943–2017), French singer and actor
- Johnny Hon (born 1971), Hong Kong businessman and politician
- Johnny Hooker (born 1987), Brazilian rock/MPB musician
- Johnny Huggins (born 1976), American football player
- Johnny Johnson (disambiguation), multiple people
- Johnny Juzang (born 2001), American basketball player
- Johnny Karras (1928–2008), American football player
- Johnny Kemp (1959–2015), Bahamian musician
- Johnny Kieper (1932–2022), American racing driver and team owner
- Johnny Kitagawa (1931–2019), Japanese-American businessman and talent manager
- Johnny Knoxville (born 1971), American actor, daredevil, comedian, screenwriter and film producer
- Johnny Lee (actor) (1898–1965), American actor
- Johnny Lee (singer) (born 1946), American country music singer
- Johnny Lewis (1983–2012), American actor
- Johnny Lozada (born 1967), Puerto Rican singer, show host and actor
- Johnny Mackorell (1912–1980), American football player and coach
- Johnny Manziel (born 1992), American football player
- Johnny Marr (born 1963), English musician, songwriter, and singer
- Johnny Mathis (born 1935), American singer
- Johnny Maxey (born 1993), American football player
- Johnny Mercer (1909–1976), American lyricist, songwriter and singer
- Johnny Moeller (born 1970), American guitarist
- Johnny Moyal (born 1965), Israeli Olympic gymnast
- Johnny Nash (1940–2020), American singer-songwriter
- Johnny Naumu (1919–1982), American football player
- Johnny Newton (born 2002), American football player
- Johnny Olson (1910–1985), American radio personality and television announcer.
- Johnny Crown (born 21 January 1997), Nigerian-American singer and rapper
- Johnny Owen (1956–1980), Welsh boxer
- Johnny Pacar (born 1981), American actor
- Johnny Ace Palmer, American close-up magician
- Johnny Papalia (1924–1997), Canadian fugitive who was murdered
- Johnny Parsons (born 1944), American racing driver
- Johnny Patterson (racing driver) (died 1969), NASCAR driver
- Johnny Peacock (1910–1981), American baseball player
- Johnny Peacock (American football) (born 1947), American football player
- Johnny Pemberton (born 1981), American actor and comedian
- Johnny G. Plate (born 1956), Indonesian former politician and businessman
- Johnny Reed McKinzie Jr. (born 1985), better known by his stage name Jay Rock, American rapper and songwriter
- Johnny Reklai (1948–2007), Palauan politician
- Johnny Ringo (1850–1882), American gunfighter and fugitive who was murdered
- Johnny Rivers (born 1942), American singer, songwriter, guitarist, and record producer
- Johnny Roeg (1910–2003), Dutch footballer, striker for Ajax
- Johnny Roselli, American mobster
- Johnny Rotten (born 1956), alias of John Lydon, English lead singer of the Sex Pistols
- Johnny Rey (1963–2006), American actor, model, and director
- Johnny Ruffo (1988–2023), Australian singer, songwriter, musician and actor
- Johnny Selemani (born 2008), Canadian-born football forward
- Johnny Sequoyah (born 2002), American actress
- Johnny Simmons (born 1986), American actor
- Johnny Sims (born 1967), American football player
- Johnny Sins (born 1978), American pornographic actor
- Johnny Slawinski (born 2007), American baseball player
- Johnny Stanton (born 1994), American football player
- Johnny Steele (racing driver) (born 1934), American racing driver
- Johnny Townsend (American football) (born 1995), American football player
- Johnny Unitas (1933–2002), American football player
- Johnny von Neumann (1903–1957), nickname of Hungarian–American mathematician, born Neumann János Lajos
- Johnny Wactor (1986–2024), American actor
- Johnny "Big Moose" Walker (1927–1999), American blues pianist and organist
- Johnny Walker (Indian actor) (1926–2003), Indian film actor and comedian (died 2003)
- Johnny Walker (DJ) (1948–2004), American radio disc jockey
- Johnny Walker (baseball) (1896–1976), American baseball player
- Johnny Walker (footballer, born 1973), Scottish footballer
- Johnny Walker (footballer, born 1928) (1928–2019), Scottish footballer
- Johnny Walker (Australian footballer) (1908–1980), Australian rules footballer
- Johnny Walker (fighter) (born 1992), Brazilian mixed martial artist
- Johnny Walker Jr. (born 2001), American football player
- Johnny Weir (born 1984), American figure skater
- Johnny Winter (1944–2014), American blues guitarist, singer, and record producer
- Johnny Whitaker (born 1959), American actor
- Johnny Whitworth (born 1975), American actor

=== Johnnie ===
- Johnnie S. Aikens (1914–1986), American politician
- Johnnie Allan (born 1938), American singer-songwriter
- Johnnie Armstrong, Scottish villain and a ballad about him
- Johnnie Barnes (born 1968), American football player
- Johnnie Bassett (1935–2012), American songwriter and musician
- Johnnie Baxter, GB & England international rugby league footballer
- Johnnie Beattie (born 1985), Scotland international rugby union player
- Johnnie Becker (1903–1947), American football player
- Johnnie Blockburger (born 2002), American sprinter
- Johnnie Boden (born 1961), British entrepreneur and founder of Boden
- Johnnie Bryant (born 1985), American basketball coach
- Johnnie Burn (born 1970), British sound engineer
- Johnnie Burton, Wyoming politician
- Johnnie Byrd (born 1951), American politician
- Johnnie Caldwell Jr., American politician
- Johnnie L. Caldwell (1922–2014), American politician and attorney
- Johnnie Carr (1911–2008), American civil rights leader
- Johnnie Carson (born 1943), American diplomat
- Johnnie Casson (born 1943), English comedian
- Johnnie Chambers (1911–1977), American baseball player
- Murder of Johnnie Mae Chappell (1929–1964), 1964 murder in Jacksonville, Florida
- Johnnie Christmas, American-Canadian graphic novelist
- Johnnie Ruth Clarke (1919–1978), American activist
- Johnnie Clay (1898–1973), Welsh cricketer
- Johnnie Cochran (1937–2005), American attorney
- Johnnie Cole, American football player and coach
- Johnnie Colemon (1920–2014), American theologian
- Johnnie H. Corns (1936–2020), United States Army general
- Johnnie Cowan (1913–1993), American baseball player
- Johnnie Cradock (1904–1987), English television chef, food writer
- Johnnie Crutchfield (born 1947), American politician
- Johnnie Dady (born 1961), South Australian artist and arts educator
- Johnnie Davis (1910–1983), American actor and singer
- Johnnie Dawson (1914–1984), American baseball player
- Johnnie Dee (born 1961), Canadian musical artist
- Johnnie Dirden (born 1952), American football player
- Johnnie Dixon (defensive back) (born 1988), American gridiron football player
- Johnnie Dixon (wide receiver) (born 1994), American football player
- Johnnie Bob Dixon (1899–1985), American baseball player
- Johnnie Dodge (1894–1960), British Army officer
- Johnnie Fingers (born 1956), Irish musician
- Johnnie Frierson (1945–2010), American gospel singer
- Johnnie Garry (1924–2018), American historian and road manager
- Johnnie van Gent (1930–2018), South African water polo player
- Johnnie Gray (born 1953), American football player
- Johnnie Hamp, British television producer
- Johnnie Harris (American football) (born 1972), American football player
- Johnnie Harris (basketball) (born 1966), American basketball coach
- Johnnie Heving (1896–1968), American baseball player
- Johnnie Lee Higgins (born 1983), American football player
- Johnnie High (1929–2010), American musician
- Johnnie Hoskins (1892–1987), Speedway promoter
- Johnnie Bryan Hunt (1927–2006), American trucking entrepreneur
- Johnnie David Hutchins (1922–1943), Decorated United States Navy sailor
- Johnnie Jackson (born 1982), English football manager
- Johnnie Jackson (American football) (born 1967), American football player
- Johnnie O. Jackson (born 1971), American bodybuilder and powerlifter
- Johnnie Johnson (musician) (1924–2005), American jazz, blues, and rock and roll pianist
- Johnnie Johnson (RAF officer, born 1915) (1915–2001), RAF flying ace in the Second World War
- Johnnie Johnson (American football) (born 1956), American football player
- Johnnie Johnson (RAF officer, born 1917) (1917–2009), English cricketer
- Johnnie Johnson Jr. (born 1942), American police officer
- Johnnie Johnston (1915–1996), American actor and singer
- Johnnie Jones (born 1962), American gridiron football player
- Johnnie Jones (lawyer) (1919–2022), Louisiana state legislator
- Johnnie Jungleguts (born 1987), American artist living in Los Angeles
- Johnnie Keyes (1940– 2018), American pornographic actor
- Johnnie Lacy (1937–2010), American disability and civil rights activist
- Johnnie LeMaster (born 1954), American baseball player
- Johnnie Lewis (1946–2015), Liberian lawyer and politician
- Johnnie Lovesin (1949–2019), Canadian musical artist
- Johnnie MacViban (born 1955), Cameroonian journalist
- Johnnie Maitland (1914–1988), Australian sports shooter
- Johnnie Marshall (born 1961), American musician
- Johnnie Mae Matthews (1922–2002), American singer
- Johnnie Mercer (footballer) (1877–1947), English footballer
- Johnnie Moore Jr. (born 1983), American evangelical leader and businessman
- Johnnie Morant (born 1981), American football player
- Johnnie Morgan (1892–1947), Welsh rugby player
- Johnnie E. Morris-Tatum (born 1951), American politician
- Johnnie Morris (actor) (1887–1969), American actor
- Johnnie Mortimer (1931–1992), British television scriptwriter
- Johnnie Morton (born 1971), American football player
- Johnnie Notions (c.1730–c.1803), Shetland physician
- Johnnie Oden, American baseball player
- Johnnie Parsons (1918–1984), American racing driver
- Johnnie Phelps (1922–1997), Decorated WWII Veteran
- Johnnie Planco (c.1951–2019), American talent manager
- Johnnie Poe (born 1959), American football player
- Johnnie Hines Watts Prothro (1922–2009), American nutritionist
- Johnnie Rankin (1901–1952), Scottish footballer
- Johnnie B. Rawlinson (born 1952), American judge
- Johnnie Ray (1927–1990), American singer and pianist
- Johnnie Robinson (born 1944), American football player
- Johnnie Roebuck (born 1942), American educator and politician
- Johnnie Schofield (1889–1955), British actor
- Johnnie Seale (born 1938), American baseball player
- Johnnie Spence (1936–1977), British musical arranger, director and orchestra leader
- Johnnie Stewart (1917–2005), British television producer
- Johnnie Stiegler (born 1982), American pair skater
- Johnnie Swearingen (1908–1993), American painter
- Johnnie Taylor (1934–2000), American singer and songwriter
- Johnnie Tillmon (1926–1995), American welfare rights activist
- Johnnie To (born 1955), Hong Kong filmmaker
- Johnnie Tolan (1917–1986), American racing driver
- Johnnie Torjussen (born 1999), English badminton player
- Johnnie Troutman (born 1987), American football player
- Johnnie Turner (Kentucky politician) (1947–2024), American attorney and politician
- Johnnie Turner (Tennessee politician), American politician
- Johnnie Tyler (1906–1972), American baseball player
- Johnnie Valentino (born 1957), American musician
- Johnnie Vivens (1896–1958), American baseball player
- Johnnie Wade (born 1932), British actor
- Johnnie Walker (DJ) (1945–2024), British radio DJ
- Johnnie Walker (racing driver) (1944–2024), Australian racing driver
- Johnnie Walker (actor) (1894–1949), American actor and film producer
- Johnnie Walker (cyclist) (born 1987), Australian cyclist
- Johnnie Wallace (1900–1975), Australia & Scotland international rugby union player
- Johnnie Walls (1944/1945–2025), American lawyer and politician
- Johnnie Walters (1933–2023), Canadian television host
- Johnnie Mac Walters (1919–2014), American lawyer and civil servant
- Johnnie Wamsley (born 1988), American politician
- Johnnie White (1946/1947–2007), Commander of the Official IRA
- Johnnie Wilder Jr. (1949–2006), American singer
- Johnnie Williams (baseball) (1889–1963), Hawaiian baseball player
- Johnnie Lee Wills (1912–1984), American singer-songwriter
- Johnnie E. Wilson (born 1944), United States Army general
- Johnnie Wittig (1914–1999), American baseball player
- Johnnie Wright (1914–2011), American country music singer-songwriter
- Johnnie J. Young (1938–2025), American politician
- Johnnie Mae Young (1923–2014), American professional wrestler

== Fictional characters ==
- Johnny 5, the robot star of the Short Circuit films
- Ghost Rider (Johnny Blaze), alternate identity of Ghost Rider, a comic book character
- Johnny Bravo, from his eponymous show
- Johnny Cade, in S. E. Hinton's 1967 novel The Outsiders and the 1983 film of the same name
- Johnny Cage, from the Mortal Kombat video game series
- Johnny Connor, in the British television series Coronation Street
- Johnny Fiama, on The Muppet Show
- Johnny Horton (Griffin), a Marvel Comics supervillain
- Johnny Klebitz, the main character from the video game Grand Theft Auto IV: The Lost and Damned
- Johnny Lawrence, in the film The Karate Kid and the Netflix series Cobra Kai
- Johnny Mnemonic, the title character of a book by William Gibson and of the film based on the book
- Johnny Tightlips, a recurring mobster from The Simpsons who is a part of Fat Tony (The Simpsons)'s gang
- Johnny Truant, a narrator in House of Leaves
- Johnny Sack, a character on The Sopranos
- Johnny Soprano, the father of Tony Soprano from The Sopranos
- Johnny J. Worthington III, in the Pixar media franchise Monsters, Inc.
- Johnny Joestar, the main character of the seventh part of the manga series Jojo's Bizarre Adventure, titled Steel Ball Run

== See also ==
- Alternate forms for the name John
- Johny
- Jonnie
- Jonny
- Jhonny (disambiguation)
