= Jhonny =

Jhonny, or Jhony, is a given name. It is an alternate spelling of Johnny. Notable people with the name include:

== Jhonny ==
- Jhonny Acosta (born 1983), Costa Rican footballer
- Jhonny Arteaga (born 1986), Colombian footballer and coach
- Jhonny Bravo (born 1985), Peruvian footballer
- Jhonny Cubero (born 1976), Costa Rican footballer
- Jhonny González (born 1981), Mexican boxer
- Jhonny Haikella Hakaye (born 1958), Namibian politician
- Jhonny Núñez (born 1985), Dominican baseball player
- Jhonny Peralta (born 1982), Dominican baseball player
- Jhonny Pereda (born 1996), Venezuelan baseball player
- Jhonny Quiñónez (born 1998), Ecuadorian footballer
- Jhonny Rivera (born 1972), Colombian entertainer
- Jhonny da Silva (born 1991), Uruguayan footballer
- Jhonny Vidales (born 1992), Peruvian footballer

== Jhony ==
- Jhony Arteaga (born 2001), Ecuadorian weightlifter
- Jhony Brito (born 1998), Dominican baseball player
- Jhony Douglas (born 1997), Brazilian footballer
- Jhony Galli (born 1990), Uruguayan footballer
- Jesucristo Esthil Kote López, known as Jhony (born 1990), Equatoguinean footballer
- Jhony MC, Brazilian musician and YouTuber
- Jhony Obeso (born 1991), Peruvian footballer
- Jhony Peralta (born 1964), Peruvian politician
- Jhony Rios (born 1985), Colombian footballer

== See also ==
- Jhoni Marchinko, American screenwriter
- Jhonnier Gonzalez (born 1982), Colombian footballer
- Jhon (disambiguation)
- Jhonathan
- Alternate forms for the name John
