= Juanico (disambiguation) =

Juanico or San Juanico may refer to:

== Individuals ==
- Juanico, Portuguese footballer
- Régis Juanico, French politician
- Arquímedes Juanicó, Argentinian rower

== Places ==
- Juanicó, Town in Canelones, Uruguay
- San Juanico Bridge, Second longest bridge in the Philippines
- San Juanico Strait, Strait between Leyte and Samar
- San Juanico, Baja California Sur, Mexican fishing village
- San Juanico Airstrip, Dirt airstrip in Baja California Sur, Mexico

== Other uses ==
- San Juanico Disaster, 1984 Industrial Disaster in Mexico
- San Juanico Bridge torture, Torture method used by the Marcos dictatorship

== See also ==
- San Juanito (disambiguation)
