= Hebridean mythology and folklore =

Part of Scottish mythology

The Inner and Outer Hebrides off the western coast of Scotland are made up of a great number of large and small islands. These isolated islands are the source of a number of Hebridean myths and legends. The Hebridean Islands are a part of Scotland that have always relied on the surrounding sea to sustain the small communities which have occupied parts of the islands for centuries, resulting in a number of sea legends relating to these local islands.

== Water spirits ==
=== Kelpies ===
The kelpie is a shape-shifting water spirit that appears as a horse, but is able to adopt human form. The Kelpie is believed to lure people by their whistle or appearance, especially children, then ride them into the water and drown them. They are said to occupy several lochs or lakesides, including one at Leurbost.

=== Blue men of the Minch ===
The blue men of the Minch (also known as Storm Kelpies) were said to occupy the stretch of water between Lewis and mainland Scotland, looking for sailors to drown and stricken boats to sink. They look human, but they are blue in colour. They create storms and seek out ships to sink.

=== Seonaidh (Shoney) ===
The Seonaidh was a Celtic Sea God who took offerings of ale from the inhabitants of Lewis.

== Merpeople ==
Mermaids are usually an unlucky omen, foretelling disaster and sometimes provoking it, often with murderous intent. It has been claimed that there is a mermaid's grave in Benbecula, though the exact location of the purported grave is unknown. According to legend, the mermaid was killed in the early 19th century, after having been sighted for a number of days, after which a teenage boy threw a rock at it, thus killing it. Accounts stated that the upper part of the creature was the size of an infant, while its lower half resembled a salmon.

Mermen are wilder than mermaids, much uglier, and have no interest in humans.

== Water monsters ==
=== Loch monsters ===
Searrach Uisge was a lake monster who was said to occupy Loch Suainbhal. Resembling a capsized boat, sightings of it swimming have been reported for one and a half centuries, with local legend being that lambs were once offered annually to it. Other such creatures have been reported in several other lochs, including Loch Urubhal.

At Loch Duvat in Eriskay, while out looking for a horse that escaped his farm in the mist, a farmer reported that he saw what he thought was his missing horse in the loch. As he approached, he realised he was looking at a strange creature which gave an unearthly yell, sending the farmer running home.

=== Sea monsters ===
Various sea monsters have been reported off the shores of Lewis over the years, including a sighting reported in 1882 by a German ship off the Butt of Lewis. The ship, 15 kilometres (9.3 mi) off the coast, reported a sea serpent around 40 metres (130 ft) in length, with several bumps protruding from the water along its back. Sea serpents have also been reported at the southern side of the island.

== Werewolves ==
A family of werewolves were said to occupy an island on Loch Langavat. Though reportedly long-dead, legend tells that disturbing their graves would release their spirits.

== Will-o'-the-wisp ==
Will-o'-the-wisps have been reported in the area of Sandwick in Dunrossness, supposedly announcing the approaching death of a local. It is said that their strange lights float around the sea when someone is about to pass.

== Sithchean (fairies) ==
In traditional Hebridean folklore, the Sithchean, or fairies, are a morally-ambiguous supernatural race of small humanoid creatures that inhabit knolls and places of special significance across the Hebrides. Evidence of the Sithche are found throughout the Hebrides, interwoven into its stories, music and the traditional healing beliefs of the native Hebridean people.

=== Appearance ===
Like regular men and women, the Sithchean sexes differ both in appearance and characteristics. The Sithchean women are commonly described as being no taller than a young girl in height, and wearing green clothes. Sithchean men are described as being roughly 4 ft (1.2 m) in height, and wearing clothes not exclusively (but most commonly) dyed red with "crotal" lichen.

Most stories about the Sithchean describe them as either great beauties or wizened creatures. The Bean Shith (banshee) (literally "fairy woman") is noted as having no nostrils, webbed feet and long sagging breasts that cannot suckle her young. However, in other sources, the Bean Shith is described as being remarkably handsome.

On the Isle of Mull and its neighbouring islands, the Sithchean are said to have only one nostril; however, this seems to be exclusive to this region of the Hebrides.

=== Dwelling ===
The Sithchen in stories are often seen from the entrance of their dwelling having a Ceilidh inside their knolls. Craig Hasten, a castle-like knoll to the south of the village of Baile Mòr in Paible, North Uist, is known locally as a dwelling place of fairies.

=== Dogs ===
On the Isle of Harris a Cu Sith (fairy dog) is said to leave oversized pawprints on the sand that disappear halfway across the beach. It is alleged that this is a fairy hound. In South Uist, a woman walking with two friends in the pitch dark watched as a self-illuminating dog, the size of a collie but with a small head and no eyes, ran towards her. The creature vanished as it bounded past. Upon returning home and describing what had happened to her aunt, the woman's aunt told her that it was a cu sìth, a fairy hound.

=== Gifts ===
One of the heirlooms of the chiefs of Clan MacLeod is the Fairy Flag. Numerous traditions state that the flag originated as a gift from the fairies.

Cows, said to have been found on the shores of Luskentyre in Harris, Scorrybrec in Skye, and on the Island of Bernera, were called cro sith, 'fairy cows', as they were "of no mortal breed", but instead believed to be of a kind that lived under the sea on meillich, seaweed.

== See also ==
- British folklore
- Celtic mythology
- Hebrides
- History of the Outer Hebrides
- Matter of Britain
- Rocabarraigh
- Scottish mythology

== Sources ==
- Gregorson Campbell, John (1900). Superstitions of the Highlands and Islands of Scotland: Collected entirely from Oral Sources. Glasgow: James MacLehose and Sons.
