= Jhony =

Equatoguinean footballer (born 1990)

Personal information
- Full name: Jesucristo Esthil Kote López
- Date of birth: 15 August 1990 (age 36)
- Place of birth: Malabo, Equatorial Guinea
- Height: 1.83 m (6 ft 0 in)
- Positions: Striker; attacking midfielder

Youth career
- Vallecas

Senior career*
Years	Team	Apps	(Gls)
2009	Canillas		
2010	Antequera	1	(0)
2010–2011	Santa Eugenia	29	(4)
2011	Colonia Moscardó	0	(0)
2013–2014	Santa Eugenia	16	(3)
2014–2015	TuS Makkabi Berlin	38	(21)
2015–2016	BSV Hürtürkel	22	(4)
2016–2017	TuS Makkabi Berlin	25	(10)
2017–2018	SC Staaken	21	(5)
2018	SC Staaken II	1	(3)
2019–2023	FSV Spandauer Kickers	82	(37)
2022	FSV Spandauer Kickers II	2	(1)
2023	FC Spandau 06	10	(2)
2024–2025	SC Charlottenburg	26	(4)
2025	SSC Teutonia 99	12	(0)
Total		285	(94)

International career
2011	Equatorial Guinea U23	1	(0)
2010	Equatorial Guinea	1	(0)
- * Club domestic league appearances and goals

Jesucristo Esthil Kote López (born 15 August 1990), known as Jhony, is an Equatoguinean former footballer who played as a striker. He represented Equatorial Guinea at international level. Jhony also holds Spanish citizenship.

== Club career ==
In January 2010, Jhony was on trial in the Segunda División B side San Roque, but he failed to stay. Nevertheless, he signed for the Tercera División side Antequera in the following month.

== International career ==
In July 2010, he received his first call for the Equatoguinean senior team and to play a friendly match against Morocco on 11 August 2010. Jhony was substitute and replaced Pedro Obama in the 85th minute.
