= British folklore =

Overview of the folklore of Britain

British folklore includes topics such as the region's legends, recipes, and folk beliefs seen throughout the United Kingdom or Britain. British folklore includes English folklore, Scottish folklore and Welsh folklore. Many of these shared tales are tied to real modern and ancient geographical features that have inspired stories of mythical creatures and characters. The traditions inherited from folklore of generations past also still continue to influence present British culture in regards to current local festivals, literature and preserved customs.

== Location of Origin ==
Folk stories are often used to make sense of the world around them, and historically done by rooting meaning to the local landscape. With this, natural landmarks woven with memory and belief become keepers of preserved cultural identity for the generations that come after them.

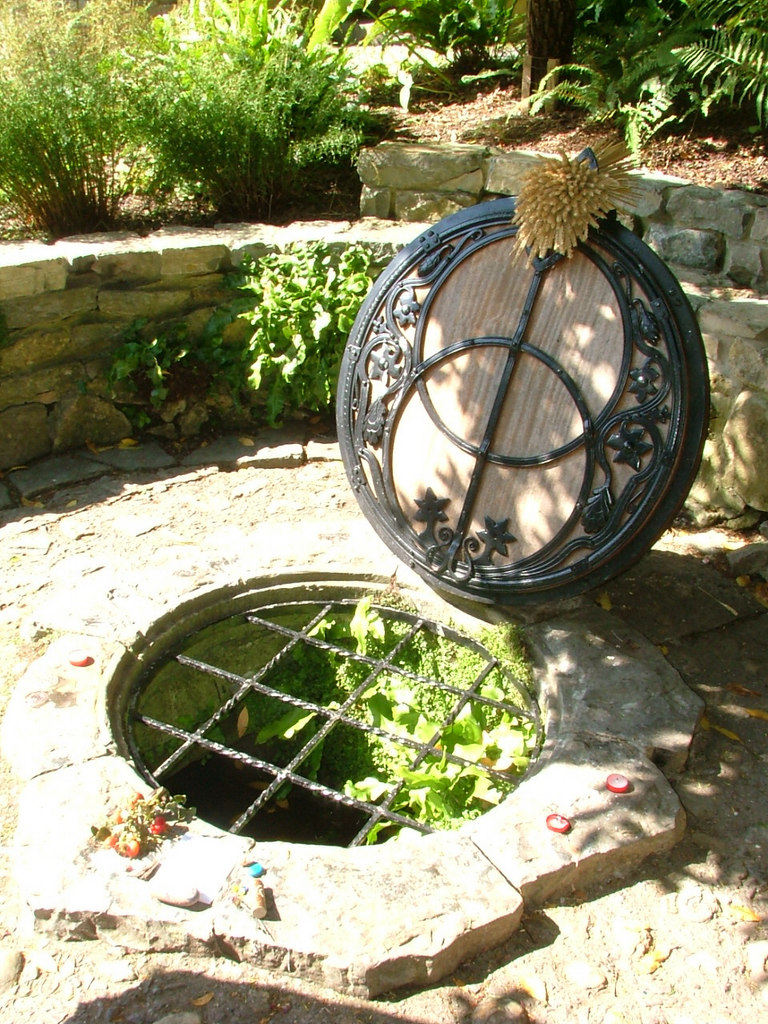
The Glastonbury Chalice Well

=== A Few Prominent Landmarks ===
The Chalice Well in Glastonbury is a famous holy well distinctly marked by its murky red water, and surrounded by sprawling gardens. The well itself is connected to many myths and legacies from the final resting place of King Arthur of Avalon, to the legendary Holy Grail. This heritage site has long been considered a place of healing, peace, and pilgrimage.

Stonehenge is a circular-stone monument on Salisbury Plain in Wiltshire that was first constructed more than 4500 years ago. The early origins of this landmark are tied to Geoffrey of Monmouth's work titled History of the Kings of Britain, where he wrote that the magician Merlin was ordered to create Stonehenge by King Aurelius Ambrosius, and that the stones themselves were believed to have healing properties.

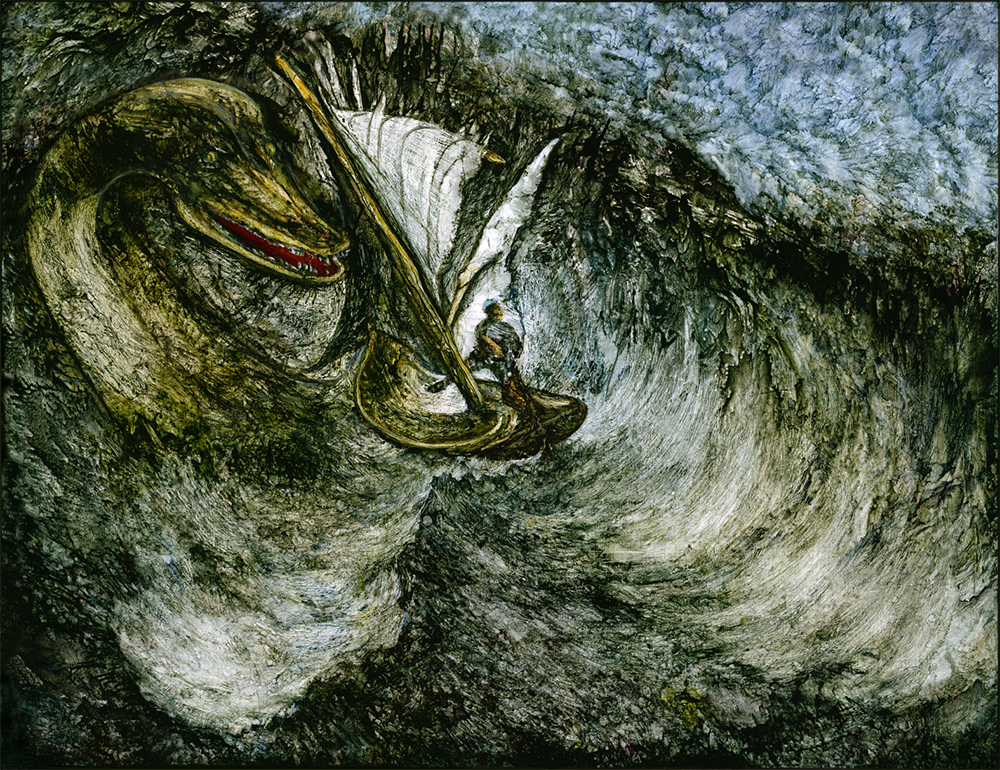
Artwork depicting the Loch Ness Monster

Loch Ness is a large, murky freshwater lake located in the Scottish Highlands. The myths surrounding this location stem from ancient times, with early religious texts and local folklore acknowledging an “aquatic beast." Legends around the lake are still avidly shared and constantly evolving today, many of which are tales that feature Nessie, The Loch Ness Monster.

== See also ==
- Celtic mythology
- Cornish mythology
- Hebridean mythology and folklore
- Irish mythology
- Matter of Britain
- Matter of England
- Scottish mythology
- Welsh mythology
- Owen Parfitt
