= Keita Karamokoba =

Guinean footballer

Keita
Personal information
- Full name: Keita Junior Karamokoba
- Date of birth: 15 April 1994 (age 32)
- Place of birth: Conakry, Guinea
- Height: 1.77 m (5 ft 9 1/2 in)
- Position: Forward

Team information
- Current team: C.D Acero

Youth career
- Rayo Vallecano
- 2011–2013: Huracán

Senior career*
Years	Team	Apps	(Gls)
2011	Santa Eugenia	9	(2)
2013–2015	Huracán	7	(0)
2014	→ Alcalá (loan)	5	(1)
2014–2015	→ San Roque (loan)	14	(5)
2015	Levante B	17	(8)
2015–2016	Recreativo	15	(0)
2016–2017	Peralada	20	(9)
2017	Saguntino	7	(4)
2017–2018	Ontinyent	14	(2)
2018	Beitar Tel Aviv Ramla	9	(1)
2018–2019	CD San Roque de Lepe	11	(2)
2019	Coria	18	(5)
2019	Moralo	5	(0)
2019–	Olímpic de Xàtiva	19	(7)

International career
2017–	Guinea	1	(1)
- * Club domestic league appearances and goals as of 1 February 2018

Keita Junior Karamokoba (born 15 April 1994), known as Keita Junior or simply Keita, is a Guinean footballer who plays for Israeli club Beitar Tel Aviv Ramla and the Guinea national team as a forward.

== Club career ==
Keita was born in Conakry, but moved to Spain at early age. After representing Rayo Vallecano as a youth, he moved to CD Santa Eugenia in the regional leagues in January 2011, and made his senior debut for the club during the 2010–11 campaign.

In July 2011 Keita joined Huracán Valencia CF, returning to the youth setup. He was promoted to the first team in Segunda División B ahead of the 2013–14 campaign, but after appearing rarely, he was loaned to Tercera División side RSD Alcalá in January 2014.

On 25 August 2014, Keita agreed to a one-year loan deal with CD San Roque de Lepe also in the third division. The following 2 February he signed for Levante UD, being initially assigned to the reserves in the fourth tier.

Keita continued to appear in the lower leagues in the following years, representing Recreativo de Huelva, CF Peralada, Atlético Saguntino and Ontinyent CF.

== International career ==
Keita was first called up for the Guinea national team on 26 October 2017, ahead of a 2018 FIFA World Cup qualifiers against DR Congo. He made his full international debut on 11 November, coming on as a substitute for Guy-Michel Landel and scoring the equalizer in the 1–3 away loss at the Stade des Martyrs in Kinshasa.

=== International goals ===
#	Date	Venue	Opponent	Score	Result	Competition
1	11 November 2017	Stade des Martyrs, DR Congo	DR Congo	1–1	1–3	2018 FIFA World Cup qualifiers
