= Pablo Franco =

Spanish football manager

Personal information
- Full name: Pablo Franco Martín
- Date of birth: 11 June 1980 (age 46)
- Place of birth: Madrid, Spain

Team information
- Current team: Espérance de Tunis (manager)

Managerial career
- Years: Team
- 2008–2009: Coria (assistant)
- 2009–2010: Fuenlabrada (assistant)
- 2010–2012: Santa Eugenia
- 2012–2013: Illescas
- 2013–2014: Puertollano
- 2014–2015: Getafe B
- 2015: Getafe
- 2016: Saburtalo Tbilisi
- 2017-2018: BSU (assistant)
- 2018: Real Madrid (assistant)
- 2019–2021: Qadsia
- 2021–2022: Simba
- 2023–2024: AmaZulu
- 2024–2025: Al Faisaly
- 2025–2026: Maghreb Fez
- 2026–: Espérance de Tunis

Pablo Franco Martín (born 11 June 1980) is a Spanish football manager who is the manager of Tunisian Ligue Professionnelle 1 club Espérance de Tunis. He is best known for leading Botola Pro club Maghreb of Fez to the 2025–26 Moroccan league title, the club's first championship in 41 years, before departing the club weeks later.

== Manager career ==
Born in Madrid, Franco was an assistant manager at Coria and Fuenlabrada, and started his managerial career at Santa Eugenia in 2010. On 27 January 2012, he returned to Fuenlabrada, now as a fitness coach.

On 5 July 2012 Franco was named the manager of Illescas, with his side in Tercera División. On 11 June of the following year, he was appointed at the helm of fellow league team Puertollano; in his first and only campaign he led the club to a first position in their group, but the Castile-La Mancha side renounced promotion due to financial problems.

On 28 July 2014 Franco was appointed as manager of Getafe B. On 26 February of the following year, after the resignation of Quique Flores, he was named as interim manager of the main squad, and appeared in his professional match two days later, a 2–3 away loss against Málaga.

On 3 March 2015, Franco's spell in the main squad was further extended, with Javier Casquero as his assistant. Eight days later, after a 2–1 away win against Córdoba, the duo was officially granted until the end of the season.

On 1 June 2015, after avoiding relegation with the main squad, he was relieved from his duties. On 10 March of the following year, he was appointed as manager of Georgian club Saburtalo Tbilisi, joining compatriot Manolo Hierro.

In June 2023, Franco was appointed as manager of South African Premiership club AmaZulu.

On 30 December 2024, Franco was appointed as manager of Saudi First Division League club Al-Faisaly.

On 22 June 2025, Franco was named head coach of Botola Pro club Maghreb of Fez on a one-year contract, becoming the club's fourth manager to arrive with previous experience in Arab and African football, having previously worked in Kuwait, Saudi Arabia, Tanzania and South Africa.

In the 2025–26 Botola Pro season, Franco led MAS Fès to the club's first Moroccan championship in 41 years and its fifth overall title, sealed with a 2–0 win over Olympique Dcheira on the final matchday, 5 July 2026. MAS Fès finished the campaign with 59 points from 16 wins, 11 draws and only 3 defeats in 30 matches, two points ahead of runners-up RS Berkane, with the division's best defensive record, conceding just 17 goals.

The title win secured MAS Fès a place in the 2026–27 CAF Champions League.

On 14 July 2026, MAS Fès announced the termination of Franco's contract, a day after the club also parted ways with sporting director Badr Elkaddouri as part of a wider restructuring of its sporting department. In its statement, the club said Franco would "forever be associated with one of the most prominent chapters in MAS Fès's history." According to Moroccan media, club officials had tried to persuade Franco to extend his stay, but he opted to pursue other opportunities after receiving offers from clubs in the Gulf.

== Managerial statistics ==
As of 14 July 2026

Team	Nat	From	To	Record							
Team	Nat	From	To	G	W	D	L	GF	GA	GD	Win %
Santa Eugenia	(Spain)	1 July 2010	27 January 2012	55	21	10	24	87	94	−7	38.18
Illescas	(Spain)	5 July 2012	11 June 2013	38	12	12	14	49	52	−3	31.58
Puertollano	(Spain)	11 June 2013	28 July 2014	38	31	5	2	88	18	+70	81.58
Getafe B	(Spain)	28 July 2014	26 February 2015	26	11	7	8	35	28	+7	42.31
Getafe	(Spain)	26 February 2015	1 June 2015	14	3	2	9	13	32	−19	21.43
Saburtalo Tbilisi	(Georgia (country))	10 March 2016	4 December 2016	22	10	6	6	37	27	+10	45.45
Qadsia	(Kuwait)	1 June 2019	30 June 2021	64	40	14	10	123	52	+71	62.50
Simba	(Tanzania)	8 November 2021	31 May 2022	34	19	9	6	52	22	+30	55.88
AmaZulu	(South Africa)	1 July 2023	1 October 2024	16	6	6	4	16	13	+3	37.50
Al Faisaly	(Saudi Arabia)	30 December 2024	1 June 2025	20	4	8	8	24	32	−8	20.00
Maghreb of Fez	(Morocco)	22 June 2025	14 July 2026	30	16	11	3	40	17	+23	53.33
Espérance de Tunis	(Tunisia)	3 October 2026	present	5	3	1	1	5	2	+3	60.00
Total				362	176	91	95	569	389	+180	48.62

== Honours ==
Maghreb of Fez

- Botola Pro: 2025–26
