= Scottish mythology =

Scottish mythology is the collection of myths that have emerged throughout the history of Scotland, sometimes being elaborated upon by successive generations, and at other times being rejected and replaced by other explanatory narratives.

== Nature myths ==
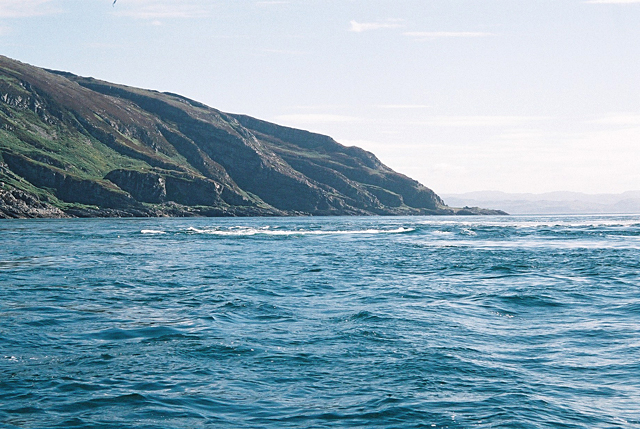
The Corryvreckan whirlpool

The myths and legends of Scotland have a "local colour" as they tell about the way of life during the olden times, apart from giving a perspective of the nature of the country during various seasons of the year. It was the belief that Beira, the Queen of Winter, had a firm hold on the country by raising storms during January and February thus preventing greenery to emerge. She was considered a tough and brutal old woman who stirred the deadly spiraling action of Corryvreckan, ushering snow, as well as torrents resulting in the overflow of rivers. Even the creation of lochs and mountains were attributed to her.

Scottish mythology is not like the Greek and Roman myths as it deals with various aspects of nature. In this context, the most powerful and feared goddess representing winter is Beira who rules winter for its entire duration. On Beltane, she readily concedes to Brighid, who enjoys power until Samhain. This myth is akin to the popular myth of the Mayans and deals with female power in the "creation and the cycle of the year". However, Donald Mackenzie, in his book Scottish Wonder Tales from Myth and Legend, states that the goddesses of the Scottish myths are not glorified, very much unlike the goddesses of ancient Greece.

The rivers in Scotland were considered the dwelling places of goddesses with their characteristic denoting the nature of the river, such as the River Forth being called "deaf or soundless river" on account of its silent flow conditions, and the River Clyde called as "the purifying river" as it caused scouring and cleansing, carrying "mud and clay" during the flood season.

=== Great Mother ===
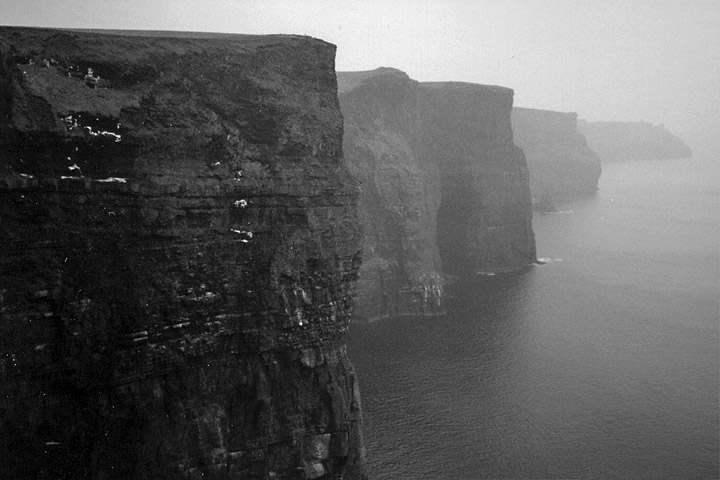
Ceann Caillí ('Hag's Head'), the southernmost tip of the Cliffs of Moher in County Clare. One of many locations named for the Cailleach

The Celtic goddesses were authoritative and were associated with female fertility as related to female divinity and earth. In olden times, the Celtics land and national societies were both linked with the body of the goddess (also attributed as "tribal goddess") and her representative on earth was the queen. Another "ambivalent" character in Scottish myths was the "hag", the Goddess, the Gaelic Cailleach, and the Giantess, a divine being who is harmful. The hag is also considered a "healer" and helpful during childbirth and is divine and said to have "long ancestry and incredible longevity". She is also known as "at once creator and destroyer, gentle and fierce, mother and nurturer".

== National mythology ==
Several origin legends for the Scots arose during the historical period, serving various purposes.

One Scottish origin legend, or pseudo-historical account of the foundation of the Scottish people, appears in adapted form in the tenth-century Latin Life of St Cathróe of Metz. It relates that settlers from Greek Asia Minor sailed the seas and arrived at Cruachan Feli "the mountain of Ireland", probably for Cruachan Éli (Croagh Patrick, Co. Mayo), a well-known place in Hiberno-Latin hagiography since Tírechán's Collectanea. As they roamed through Ireland, from Clonmacnoise, Armagh and Kildare to Cork, and finally, to Bangor, they were continually engaged at war with the Pictanei. After some time, they crossed the Irish Sea to invade Caledonia North of Roman Britain, successively capturing Iona, the cities of Rigmhonath and Bellathor in the process. The latter places are echoed by the appearance of Cinnrígmonaid and Cinnbelathoir in the Chronicle of the Kings of Alba. The territory so conquered was then named Scotia after Scota, the Egyptian wife of Spartan commander Nél or Niul, and St. Patrick converted the people to Christianity.

Once the Picts adopted Gaelic culture and their actual characteristics faded out of memory, folkloric elements filled the gaps of history. Their "sudden disappearance" was explained as a slaughter happening at a banquet given by Kenneth MacAlpin (an international folklore motif) and they were ascribed with powers like those of the fairies, brewing heather from secret recipes and living in underground chambers. In the 18th century. the Picts were co-opted as a "Germanic" race.

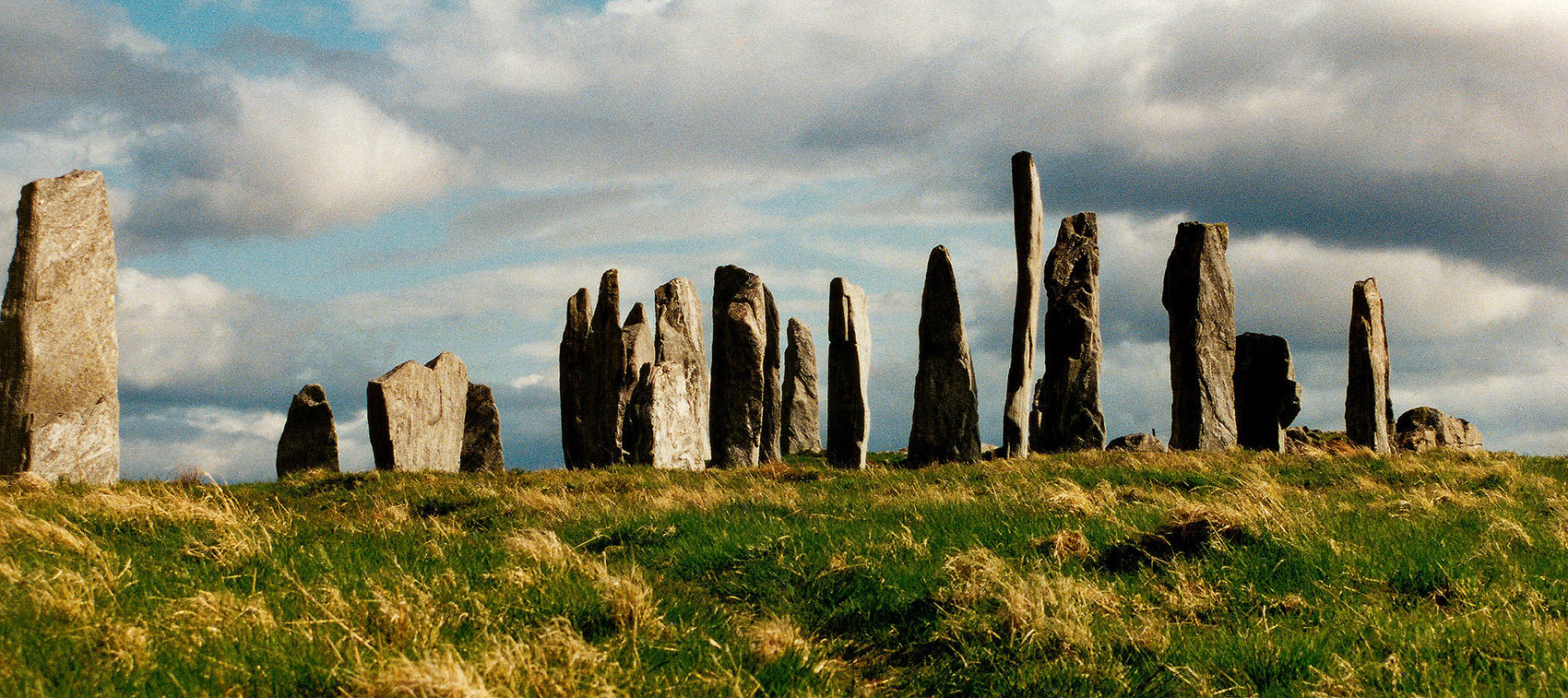
Callanish Standing stones

In the Celtic domains of Scotland, also known as Gàidhealtachd, there are ancient Neolithic structures. A centre of worship was located in the Orkney Isles at the Ness of Brodgar with its associated megalithic structures. In the farthest end of northwest Scotland there are the Standing Stones of Callanish or Calanais Stones on the Isle of Lewis — a grouped arrangement of megalithic menhirs in a circle with branching avenues — which are somewhat akin to the Stonehenge. Archaeological evidence shows that these predate Stonehenge and have been standing for more than 5,000 years and are associated with sun worship with orientation to the winter solstice.

== Ulster Cycle ==
Because of the movement of people from Ulster to west Scotland, which resulted in close linguistic links between Ulster and the west of Scotland, much of Gaelic mythology was imported to Scotland, and possibly some of it was composed in Scotland. The Ulster Cycle, set around the beginning of the Christian era, consists of a group of heroic stories dealing with the lives of Conchobar mac Nessa, king of Ulster, the great hero Cúchulainn, and of their friends, lovers, and enemies. These are the Ulaid, or people of the North-Eastern corner of Ireland and the action of the stories centres round the royal court at Emain Macha, close to the modern city of Armagh. The Ulaid had close links with Gaelic Scotland, where Cúchulainn is said to have learned the arts of war.

The cycle consists of stories of the births, early lives and training, wooings, battles, feastings and deaths of the heroes and reflects a warrior society in which warfare consists mainly of single combats and wealth is measured mainly in cattle. These stories are written for the most part in prose. The centrepiece of the Ulster Cycle is the Táin Bó Cúailnge. Other important Ulster Cycle tales include The Tragic Death of Aife's only Son, Fled Bricrenn "Bricriu's Feast", and Togail Bruidne Dá Derga "The Destruction of Da Derga's Hostel". This cycle is, in some respects, close to the mythological cycle of the rest of the Gaelic speaking world. Some characters from the latter reappear, and the same sort of shape-shifting magic is much in evidence, side by side with a grim, almost callous realism. While it may be supposed that a few characters, such as Medb or Cú Roí, once were deities—Cúchulainn in particular displaying superhuman prowess—the characters are firmly mortal and rooted in a specific time and place. Scottish Gaelic adaptations of Ulster Cycle tales appear in the Glenmasan manuscript.

== Finn and Fianna ==
The stories of Finn (Old, Middle, Modern Irish: Find, Finn, Fionn) mac Cumhaill and his band of soldiers the Fianna, appear to be set around the 3rd century in Gaelic Ireland and Scotland. They differ from other Gaelic mythological cycles in the strength of their links with the Gaelic-speaking community in Scotland and there are many extant texts from that country. They also differ from the Ulster Cycle in that the stories are told mainly in verse and that in tone they are nearer to the tradition of romance than the tradition of epic.

The single most important source for the Fenian Cycle is the Acallam na Senórach (Colloquy of the Ancients), which is found in two 15th-century manuscripts, the Book of Lismore and Laud 610, as well as a 17th-century manuscript from Killiney, County Dublin. The text is dated from linguistic evidence to the 12th century. The text records conversations between the last surviving members of the Fianna and Saint Patrick and runs to some 8,000 lines. The late dates of the manuscripts may reflect a longer oral tradition for the Fenian stories, the same oral tradition which was interpreted from Gaelic to English by James Macpherson in the Ossian stories.

The Fianna of the story are divided into the Clann Baiscne, led by Fionnghall, and the Clann Morna, led by his enemy, Goll mac Morna. Goll killed Fionnghall's father, Cumhal, in battle and the boy Fionn was brought up in secrecy. As a youth, while being trained in the art of poetry, he accidentally burned his thumb while cooking the Salmon of Knowledge, which allowed him to suck or bite his thumb in order to receive bursts of stupendous wisdom. He took his place as the leader of his band and numerous tales are told of their adventures. Two of the greatest Gaelic tales, Tóraigheacht Dhiarmada agus Ghráinne (The Pursuit of Diarmuid and Gráinne) and Oisin in Tír na nÓg form part of the cycle. The Diarmuid and Grainne story, which is one of the few Fenian prose tales, is a probable source of Tristan and Iseult.

The world of the Fenian Cycle is one in which professional warriors spend their time hunting, fighting, and engaging in adventures in the spirit world. New entrants into the band are expected to be knowledgeable in poetry as well as undergo a number of physical tests or ordeals. There is no religious element in these tales unless it is one of hero-worship.

== Hebridean myths and legends ==
The Blue men of the Minch (also known as storm kelpies), who occupy the stretch of water between Lewis and mainland Scotland, looking for sailors to drown and stricken boats to sink.

Kelpies are fabled water-spirits in the Lowland Scotland which are said to assume different shapes. Normally, they appear in the form of a horse. There is another spirit known as water-kelpie which reportedly "haunts" lakes and rivers, and indulges in drowning people. It is also reported to help running mills during night hours. Kelpies are known for standing besides the shore side of lochs and rivers appearing to be calm and approachable waiting for their victim to hop on their back in hopes to cross the waters. Kelpies can also take on the appearance of a beautiful young woman to lure young men in to devour them. One of the more commonly known story of the Kelpies is that of ten children a Kelpie tried to lure to their death. The mystic water spirit was able to get nine of them on their back, when the tenth child pet the horse’s nose his fingers became stuck to the horse fur as if magic had bonded them together. The child was able to free himself by cutting of his fingers before the horse drug all of its victims to their watery grave. Today in Falkirk, Scotland stands the largest equine structure in the world, two horse heads stand 30 meters high to represent the Kelpies that watch over the bodies of water in Scotland and to represent the horse-powered industrial heritage within the country.

Seonaidh was a Celtic water-spirit which the residents of Lewis used to worship with offer of a glass of ale. According to Dr. Martin, one night the people of Lewis appeased Seonaidh. They assembled at the church of St. Mulway, each person carried food and necessities needed for the worship. Then, from the bag of malt collected from each family, ale was brewed. Then a chosen member of the congregation waded into the sea to waist deep level holding the ale filled cup, and offered ale to Seonaidh with the prayer: "I give thee this cup of ale, hoping that thou wilt be so good as to send us plenty of seaware for enriching our ground during the coming year". This event occurred in the night. After performing the offering the person who made the offering returned to the beach, and all the assembled people moved to the church where at the altar a lighted candle was shining. After some time, when the time was appropriate, the candle was put out. The inhabitants then assembled in a field behind the church and celebrated by drinking ale. They then went back home with the hope that they would be blessed with a surfeit of crops in the coming season.

Changeling is a fairy tale in which a fairy abducts a baby from the crib and then substitutes with another fairy. It is usually normal and grown up though it appears like a child.

== Orkney and Shetland folklore ==
Selkies are said to live as seals in the sea but shed their skin to become human on land, often to dance in the light of the full moon. If they lose their skin whilst in human form, they will however, be stuck in their human form forever. When taking human form they are said to have beautiful green hair. They will often reside on rocks and islands that are hidden among the waves, in order to protect themselves from humans. Selkies are mortal creatures. The legend is apparently most common in Orkney and Shetland and is very similar to those of swan maidens.

== Religious mythology ==
Myth is sometimes an aspect of folklore, but not all myth is folklore, nor is all folklore myth or mythological. People who express an interest in mythology are often most focused on non-human (sometimes referred to as "supernatural") beings. There have been numerous groups of such entities in Scottish culture, some of them specific to particular ethnic groups (Gaelic, Norse, Germanic, etc.), others of them probably evolving from the circumstances unique to Scotland.

The Aos-sídhe, Sìdhichean, or "Fairies" were originally the pre-Christian divinities of Gaelic Scotland. Christianity began to supersede most original mythology, causing the myths to diminish in power and prominence. The medieval Gaelic literati grouped them together as the Tuatha Dé Danann, who share certain characteristics with other characters in Celtic literature. Folk beliefs about the Banshee also reflect aspects of these beings. There are other supernatural beings whose characteristics reflect folkloric patterns from around the world. Ancestral spirits, and giants who help to form the landscape and represent the forces of nature, are ubiquitous and may point to non-elite registers of mythology.

== Loch Ness Monster ==
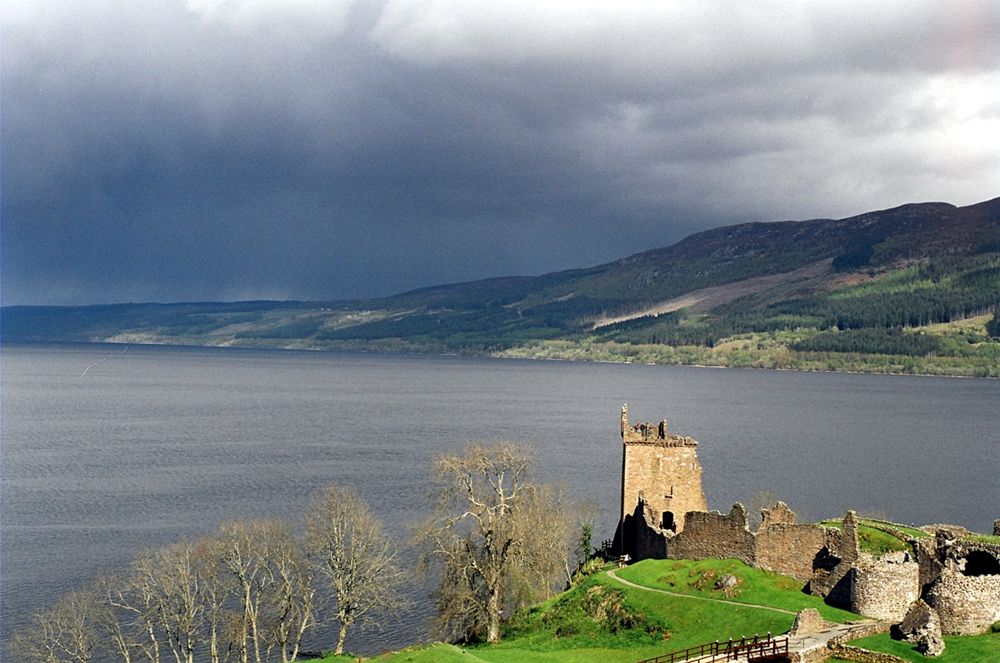
Loch Ness, the loch in Scotland in which the monster was reported to have been sighted

The Loch Ness Monster is a legendary aquatic creature reported from many sightings over many years. A popular belief is that the monster is a lone survivor of the "long-extinct plesiosaurs". Although the sighting of the monster was reported as far back as the 6th century, in recent times the sightings were reported once the road around the loch was built. The first reporting of sighting of Nessie on land was about 20 yards from the loch as the monster was approaching towards the loch; it was seen by Spicer and his wife on 22 July 1933. In April 1934 a photograph was taken by a London surgeon when he was traveling to Inverness but its authenticity has been disputed. Sightings were even reported during the World War II days in May 1943 by C.B. Farrel of the Royal Observer Corps.

Loch Ness measures 22 1/2 miles (36 kilometres) and has a width of 1 1/2 miles (2.5 kilometres) at the widest. Its depth is 754 feet (230 metres) and the bed of the loch is flat like a "bowling green". The Loch's volume is the largest in Great Britain.

The first reported sighting of the Loch Ness Monster was in the River Ness in 565 AD. The Irish monk Saint Columba was staying in the land of the Picts with his companions when he came across the locals burying a man by the River Ness. They explained that the man had been swimming the river when he was attacked by a "water beast" that had mauled him and dragged him under. They tried to rescue him in a boat, but were able only to drag up his corpse. Hearing this, Columba stunned the Picts by sending his follower Luigne moccu Min to swim across the river. The beast came after him, but Columba made the sign of the cross and commanded: "Go no further. Do not touch the man. Go back at once." The beast immediately halted as if it had been "pulled back with ropes" and fled in terror, and both Columba's men and the pagan Picts praised God for the miracle.

== Arthurian legend ==
Arthurian mythology native to Scotland can be found in oral traditions. An example is the Scots Gaelic song 'Am Bròn Binn' (The Sweet Sorrow), which has been called "an Arthurian ballad in Scottish Gaelic". In Arthurian legend Mordred, nephew of King Arthur, was raised in Orkney and it is speculated that Camelon in Stirlingshire may have been the original 'Camelot'. There is a tradition that Arthur had a Scottish son called Smervie More.

== See also ==
- Glenmasan manuscript
- Hebridean Myths and Legends
- Horseman's Word
- Second sight
- Scottish Tales of Myth & Magic
