= Tommy Roebuck =

Arkansas politician

Tommy G. Roebuck (born September 4, 1937) is a dentist and former politician in Arkansas who served in the Arkansas House of Representatives. He is a Vietnam War veteran. His wife Johnnie Roebuck ran unopposed to succeed him in office.

He was born in Gould, Arkansas. He is married to Johnie Roebuck and has three children. He received a DDS from the University of Tennessee in 1963. He served in the Arkansas National Guard from 1955-1959. He served in the United States Army from 1963-1965. He served in the United States Army Reserve from 1976-1997.

He has lived in Arkadelphia. He is a Baptist. He has served on the Arkadelphia School Board.

A Democrat, he served in the Arkansas State House of Representatives from 2000-2006.
