= San Juanico, Baja California Sur =

Settlement in Mexico

Coordinates: 26°15′27″N 112°28′44″W

San Juanico is a fishing village in Comondú Municipality, Baja California Sur, Mexico, located on the coast of the Pacific Ocean on the Bahía San Juanico. Originally a primitive settlement used by fishermen from a larger pueblo at Cadeje, legend says American smugglers and surfers noticed the bahia's waves in the mid-seventies. Afterward, the settlement grew alongside its reputation as one of the ten best surfing spots in the world. Various efforts to hide the pueblo by ex-pats include promoting the name, "Scorpion Bay" instead of San Juanico.

As of 2010, the village had a total population of 687, which included Mexican nationals living in the pueblo and in surrounding ranchos, and immigrants from the U.S. and elsewhere.

San Juanico Airstrip was notorious for smugglers but is presently closed. Nearby Cadejé Airstrip is now used for single engine aircraft.

== Climate ==
Climate data for San Juanico, Baja California Sur (1991–2020 normals, extremes 1961–present)
Month	Jan	Feb	Mar	Apr	May	Jun	Jul	Aug	Sep	Oct	Nov	Dec	Year
Record high °C (°F)	36 (97)	38 (100)	37 (99)	39.5 (103.1)	41 (106)	40 (104)	46 (115)	42 (108)	41 (106)	39 (102)	39 (102)	38 (100)	46 (115)
Mean daily maximum °C (°F)	22.7 (72.9)	23.1 (73.6)	23.4 (74.1)	23.7 (74.7)	24.0 (75.2)	26.0 (78.8)	29.6 (85.3)	31.5 (88.7)	31.4 (88.5)	28.6 (83.5)	25.6 (78.1)	22.8 (73.0)	26.0 (78.8)
Daily mean °C (°F)	15.6 (60.1)	16.2 (61.2)	16.6 (61.9)	17.2 (63.0)	17.9 (64.2)	20.3 (68.5)	24.5 (76.1)	26.4 (79.5)	26.4 (79.5)	22.5 (72.5)	19.0 (66.2)	15.9 (60.6)	19.9 (67.8)
Mean daily minimum °C (°F)	8.6 (47.5)	9.3 (48.7)	9.9 (49.8)	10.6 (51.1)	11.7 (53.1)	14.7 (58.5)	19.4 (66.9)	21.3 (70.3)	21.3 (70.3)	16.4 (61.5)	12.4 (54.3)	9.1 (48.4)	13.7 (56.7)
Record low °C (°F)	0 (32)	1.5 (34.7)	0.9 (33.6)	1 (34)	6 (43)	5 (41)	6 (43)	7 (45)	2.5 (36.5)	4 (39)	3 (37)	1.5 (34.7)	0 (32)
Average precipitation mm (inches)	8.6 (0.34)	8.8 (0.35)	5.5 (0.22)	0.8 (0.03)	0.0 (0.0)	1.1 (0.04)	0.2 (0.01)	21.5 (0.85)	23.6 (0.93)	22.7 (0.89)	12.2 (0.48)	13.8 (0.54)	118.8 (4.68)
Average rainy days	1.2	1.4	0.7	0.1	0.1	0.2	0.5	1.7	1.9	0.9	1.1	1.7	11.5
Source: Servicio Meteorológico Nacional
