= Juanito =

Other names
- Related names: Juanita, Juan, John

Juanito is a given name or nickname, meaning "Little Juan" or Johnny. Notable people with the name include:

Professional footballers

- Juan Ignacio Gomez Taleb (born 1985), Argentinian forward
- Juan Díaz Sánchez (1948–2013), Spanish forward
- Juan Gómez González (1954–1992), Spanish forward
- Juan Antonio Felipe Gallego (born 1961), Spanish defender
- Juan Francisco Rodríguez Herrera (born 1965), Spanish defender and manager
- Juan Gutiérrez Moreno (born 1976), Spanish defender and manager
- Juan Jesús Gutiérrez Robles (born 1980), Spanish defender/midfielder
- Juan Calahorro (born 1988), Spanish defender
- Juanito Sequeira (born 1982), Dutch midfielder

Other professions

- Juanito (singer) (born 1936), French-Algerian singer born Jean Claude Safrana, popular in Turkey during the 1960s
- Juanito Ibarra, Mexican-American boxing and mixed martial arts trainer
- Juanito Navarro (1924–2011), Spanish actor
- Juanito Oiarzabal (born 1956), Spanish mountaineer
- Juanito Victor C. Remulla, Filipino politician known as Jonvic Remulla
- Juanito Rubillar (born 1977), Filipino boxer

== See also ==
- San Juanito (disambiguation), various meanings
