= CD Canillas =

Spanish football club

- Full name: Club Deportivo Canillas
- Nickname: El Cani
- Founded: 1961
- Ground: Instalaciones Municipales de Canillas
- Capacity: 1,000
- President: Fernando Herrero
- Manager: Jesus Lucas
- League: Primera Autonómica de Aficionados – Group 1
- 2025–26: Primera Autonómica de Aficionados – Group 1, 3rd of 18
- Website: https://cdcanillas.com/
Home colours	Away colours

Club Deportivo Canillas is a Spanish football club based in Madrid, Spain. It was founded in 1961 and plays in the Primera Autonómica de Aficionados – Group 1. CD Canillas is a feeder team of Real Madrid.

== History ==
Canillas was formed in 1961 in Nápoles, Hortaleza, initially under the name "Club Deportivo Los Merinos". Registered in the Madrid Football Federation in 1969, it was renamed to "Club Deportivo Nápoles" due to regulation rules.

In 1975, the club was renamed to its actual name (Club Deportivo Canillas), achieving its first promotion in 1979. A youth section, "CD EPAYDA", was formed in 1997.

== Season-to-season ==
Season	Tier	Division	Place	Copa del Rey
1969–70	7	3ª Reg. P.	11th	
1970–71	7	3ª Reg. P.	13th	
1971–72	8	3ª Reg.	12th	
1972–73	8	3ª Reg.	8th	
1973–74	8	3ª Reg.	4th	
1974–75	8	3º Reg.	2nd	
1975–76	7	3ª Reg. P.	8th	
1976–77	7	3ª Reg. P.	9th	
1977–78	8	3ª Reg. P.	11th	
1978–79	8	3ª Reg. P.	2nd	
1979–80	7	2ª Reg.	15th	
1980–81	8	3ª Reg. P.	3rd	
1981–82	8	3ª Reg. P.	8th	
1982–83	7	2ª Reg.	15th	
1983–84	7	2ª Reg.	7th	
1984–85	7	2ª Reg.	15th	
1985–86	7	2ª Reg.	10th	
1986–87	7	2ª Reg.	4th	
1987–88	6	1ª Reg.	16th	
1988–89	7	2ª Reg.	2nd	

Season	Tier	Division	Place	Copa del Rey
1989–90	6	1ª Reg.	15th	
1990–91	7	2ª Reg.	5th	
1991–92	7	2ª Reg.	3rd	
1992–93	7	2ª Reg.	4th	
1993–94	7	2ª Reg.	16th	
1994–95	8	3ª Reg.	4th	
1995–96	8	3ª Reg.	1st	
1996–97	7	2ª Reg.	8th	
1997–98	7	2ª Reg.	12th	
1998–99	7	2ª Reg.	5th	
1999–2000	7	2ª Reg.	4th	
2000–01	7	2ª Reg.	9th	
2001–02	7	2ª Reg.	13th	
2002–03	7	2ª Reg.	11th	
2003–04	7	2ª Reg.	6th	
2004–05	7	2ª Reg.	2nd	
2005–06	6	1ª Reg.	15th	
2006–07	7	2ª Reg.	1st	
2007–08	6	1ª Reg.	11th	
2008–09	6	1ª Reg.	6th	

Season	Tier	Division	Place	Copa del Rey
2009–10	6	1ª Afic.	3rd	
2010–11	5	Pref.	10th	
2011–12	5	Pref.	14th	
2012–13	5	Pref.	6th	
2013–14	5	Pref.	6th	
2014–15	5	Pref.	11th	
2015–16	5	Pref.	11th	
2016–17	5	Pref.	7th	
2017–18	5	Pref.	2nd	
2018–19	4	3ª	17th	
2019–20	5	Pref.	4th	
2020–21	5	Pref.	9th	
2021–22	6	Pref.	1st	
2022–23	5	3ª Fed.	13th	
2023–24	5	3ª Fed.	13th	
2024–25	5	3ª Fed.	17th	
2025–26	6	1ª Aut.		

- 1 season in Tercera División
- 3 seasons in Tercera Federación

== Other teams ==
=== CD Canillas B and CD Canillas U19 ===
CD Canillas B, the reserve team of CD Canillas, plays in the Primera Categoría de Aficionados, the sixth tier of Spanish football while CD Canillas U19 plays in Group XII of the Liga Nacional Juvenil.

=== Women's team ===
C.D. Canillas Femenino (now CD Tacón) was bought by Real Madrid.

== Notable players ==
=== Real Madrid related ===
Since CD Canillas is the feeder club of Real Madrid, some players who came from La Fábrica, Real Madrid's youth academy, had played at CD Canillas. Famous footballers' sons have also played there.

- (France) Théo and Elyaz Zidane, sons of Zinedine Zidane
- (Brazil) Ronald Nazário, son of Ronaldo Nazário
- (Portugal) José Mario Mourinho Jr., son of José Mourinho
- (Italy) Christian Cannavaro, son of Fabio Cannavaro
- (Spain) Jaime Amaro, grandson of Amancio Amaro
- (Spain) Benjamín Garay
- (Spain) Gonzalo Expósito

=== Others ===
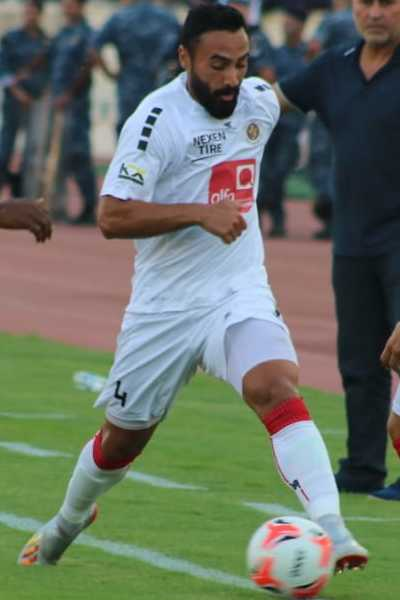
Nader Matar was born in the Ivory Coast in 1992

==== From CD Canillas youth academy ====
- (Spain) Javier Castro
- (Bulgaria) Sergey Georgiev

==== As CD Canillas senior player ====
- (Equatorial Guinea) Jhony
- (Lebanon) Nader Matar
