= John Kimble =

American talent manager (1945–2024)

- Born: John D. Kimble; August 1, 1945; Kingsville, Texas, US
- Died: November 10, 2024 (aged 79); Dallas, Texas, US
- Education: University of Texas at El Paso
- Occupation: Talent manager

John D. Kimble (August 1, 1945 – November 10, 2024) was an American talent manager. Alongside Gene Parseghian, he founded a talent agency in New York City which later merged into the William Morris Agency.

== Early life and career ==
Kimble was born on August 1, 1945, in Kingsville, Texas. He grew up in Uvalde, and in high school, he played football, acted in theater, and governed the student council. He studied the University of Texas at El Paso and earned a theater degree. He moved to New York City, where after declining a job offer from Screen Gems, pursued talent management.

Kimble first worked at the Writers & Artists agency—established by Joan Scott—until July 1977, when he founded John D. Kimble Inc. with Tim Angle. In 1978, the company merged with a talent agency of Gene Parseghian, forming the Kimble/Parseghian agency, which was headquartered at 250 West 57th Street. They managed the careers of Kevin Bacon, Griffin Dunne, William Hurt, Andrea Martin, Pamela Reed, and Martin Short.

The company later moved its headquarters to Los Angeles. There, talent managers Arnold Rifkin, Nicole Jaffe, as well as Jeffery Hunter of New York City merged their respective talent agencies and formed DHKPR. In 1984, it merged with Adams-Ray-Rosenberg, a literary agency, and Regency Artists, a music agency, to form the Triad talent agency. A multimedia talent agency, it managed people such as actors Meredith Baxter, Nell Carter, George Clooney, Sara Gilbert, Matthew Perry, Victoria Principal, Brooke Shields, and Bruce Willis, as well as musician Vince Gill. It was bought out by the William Morris Agency in 1991, with Kimble being appointed head of the TV talent department. He transferred to the company's creative branch in 2002.

Throughout his career, Kimble also managed the careers of Joan Collins, Jane Curtin, and Henry Winkler.

== Personal life and death ==
Kimble owned Kimble-Wallach, an antique store in Beverly Hills, California. He also collaborated with Meridith Baer Home, a design firm owned by screenwriter Meridith Baer. In 2022, he retired and moved to Dallas, dying there on November 10, 2024, aged 79; his death was publicized by television executive Nina Tassler.
