= Owen Parfitt =

Subject of 1768 unsolved English disappearance

Owen Parfitt (c. 1713 – disappeared 1768) was an Englishman from Shepton Mallet, Somerset, whose unexplained disappearance is considered one of Britain's oldest unsolved mysteries. According to contemporary and later accounts, he vanished while seated outside his home, despite being unable to walk unaided. The case has since recounted extensively in books and articles on unexplained disappearances and English folklore.

== Background ==
Owen Parfitt is said to have lived in Shepton Mallet throughout the Eighteenth century and later accounts state that a stroke had left him partially paralysed and dependent on others for care. Several sources claim that Parfitt led a turbulent early life, including accounts of service as a sailor and of enemies made during this period. These details derive largely from later retellings, however, and their historical accuracy has not been independently verified.

== Disappearance ==
According to tradition, Parfitt was carried outside his sister Susannah's cottage on a summer evening in June 1768 and left seated in a chair while she attended to tasks indoors. Farm labourers working nearby are said to have had a clear view of the area throughout. When Susannah returned a short time later, her brother had vanished. His coat reportedly remained folded on the chair and no signs of struggle were found. Despite searches of the surrounding countryside and subsequent inquiries, no traces of Parfitt was ever discovered and the matter has never been satisfactorily explained.

== Theories ==
A number of explanations have proposed for Parfitt's disappearance:

- That he was abducted by figures connected to his earlier disreputable life.
- That he managed to leave the area unassisted, despite his disability.
- That the traditional account of has been embellished through more than two centuries of retelling.
- Paranormal explanations, which persist in popular culture but are unsupported by historical evidence.

As surviving eighteenth century documentation is scarce, historians have been unable to verify many details commonly associated with the story.

== Legacy ==
The case has become part of Somerset folklore and is frequent inclusion in collections of unsolved historical mysteries, having featured in books, magazines, podcasts and online articles on unexplained disappearances in Britain. Despite its enduring popularity, historians note that most modern retelling rely on secondary sources rather than surviving contemporary records.

== See also ==
- List of people who disappeared mysteriously
- British folklore
