= Gene Parseghian =

American talent manager (c.1945–2017)

- Born: c. 1945; Oneonta, New York, US
- Died: March 16, 2017 (aged 72)
- Education: Guildhall School of Music and Drama; Stanford University
- Occupation: Talent manager
- Children: 1 (adoptive)

Gene Parseghian (c. 1945 – March 16, 2017) was an American talent manager. Alongside John Kimble, he founded a talent agency in New York City which later merged into the William Morris Agency.

== Biography ==
Parseghian was born c. 1945, in Oneonta, New York. A graduate of the Guildhall School of Music and Drama and Stanford University, he worked as a stage actor until 1977, when he became a talent manager. That year, he founded the agency Parseghian Associates, which merged with the agency of John Kimble, forming Kimble/Parseghian (later Triad Artists). Triad was acquired by the William Morris Agency in 1992, and until 1999, he served as a senior vice president for it. He then formed an agency with Johnnie Planco. Throughout his career, he managed numerous actors, including Daniel Day-Lewis, Judi Dench, and Eddie Redmayne.

Parseghian was a gay man and was married to Michael Colberg. He advocated for same-sex adoption, having adopted a daughter himself, which he had to hide the government in order to do. He died on March 16, 2017, aged 72, from cancer.
