= Johnnie Planco =

American talent manager (c.1951–2019)

Johnnie Planco (c. 1951 – June 2, 2019) was an American talent manager.

== Biography ==
Born c. 1951, in New York City, Planco studied at Fordham University from 1968 to 1972. In 1972, he was hired to William Morris Agency, as a mail sorter. By the time he left the agency in 2000, he was head of the New York motion picture department, and senior vice president of the company; he .was the youngest senior vice president and department head in the company's history. He then founded a talent agency and production company with Gene Parseghian. The company produced the films Perfume and The Walker, as well as a play by William Mastrosimone. The company merged with Untitled Entertainment in 2000. Throughout his career, he managed numerous actors, including Jack Lemmon, Tom Hanks, and Anthony Quinn.

Planco was married to Lois Planco, with whom he had two children, as well as a daughter-in-law. He was a former president of The Players, a social club. He died on June 2, 2019, aged 68, in New York City, from infections in the respritory and nervous system.
