= Jhony Obeso =

Peruvian footballer (born 1991)

Personal information
- Full name: Jhony Alberto Obeso Panduro
- Date of birth: 2 June 1991 (age 35)
- Place of birth: Chimbote, Peru
- Height: 1.67 m (5 ft 6 in)
- Position: Midfielder

Team information
- Current team: Deportivo Garcilaso
- Number: 17

Youth career
- José Gálvez

Senior career*
| Years | Team | Apps | (Gls) |
| 2010–2013 | José Gálvez | 61 | (2) |
| 2014 | Carlos A. Mannucci | 23 | (4) |
| 2015 | Alianza Universidad | 17 | (0) |
| 2016 | Carlos A. Mannucci | 23 | (2) |
| 2017 | Deportivo Hualgayoc | 27 | (4) |
| 2018 | Carlos A. Mannucci | 23 | (4) |
| 2019 | Cienciano | 15 | (1) |
| 2020 | Alfonso Ugarte | | |
| 2020 | Cienciano | 4 | (0) |
| 2021–2022 | Deportivo Llacuabamba | 19 | (2) |
| 2022 | Universidad San Martin | 0 | (0) |
| 2022 | Inkas FC | 0 | (0) |
| 2023- | Deportivo Garcilaso | 5 | (0) |
- * Club domestic league appearances and goals as of 15:50, 25 April 2022 (UTC)

Jhony Alberto Obeso Panduro (born 2 June 1991) is a Peruvian footballer who plays as a midfielder for Peruvian club Deportivo Garcilaso.

== Club career ==
Obeso joined the José Gálvez FBC first team in January 2010. His debut came under manager Julio César Uribe in the 1st round of the season coming on as a substitute for Santiago Salazar in a 2–1 loss away to Boys.
