= Johnnie Swearingen =

American painter

- Born: August 27, 1908; Campground Church, near Chappell Hill, TX
- Died: January 14, 1993 (aged 84); Brenham, TX
- Occupations: Folk artist, painter
- Years active: 1960s - 1993
- Known for: Scenes of rural Texas

Johnnie Swearingen (August 27, 1908 – January 14, 1993) was a self-taught artist from the Brenham, Texas area.

== Biographical details ==
Johnnie Swearingen was born the son of sharecroppers in Campground Church, near Chappell Hill, TX. He started painting around the age of twelve, using whatever materials were available, including house paint and shoe polish. After his first marriage to Lora Ann Williams ended in divorce, Swearingen made his way West, chopping cotton, picking grapes, and working other temporary jobs. He eventually made his way to San Pedro, CA, where he worked as a longshoreman. Swearingen returned to Texas in 1948, settling in Brenham and marrying his second wife, Murray Lee Williams, the following year. Back in Texas, he returned to farming and painting, and after receiving a call to preach in the early 1960s, he completed a correspondence course from the Lone Star Bible School in 1965 and became ordained. Swearingen began selling his paintings around the area: in his front yard, on the side of the road, and outside of the Washington County Courthouse. An article in the November 1976 issue of Houston Home and Gardens brought greater attention to Swearingen, and he was included in the 1980 exhibit “The Eyes of Texas: An Exhibition of Living Texas Folk Artists” at the University of Houston. By the time of his death in 1993, Swearingen had become one of Texas's most notable folk artists. Chappell Hill Historical Society Museum in Chappell Hill, Texas has the largest private collection of Swearingen paintings. As of August 2023, the collection has sixty-six (66) paintings.

== Painting Style ==
Swearingen is considered a memory painter who captured scenes of rural Texas, including work, leisure activities, and local buildings. His paintings represent an important record of the African-American experience in the area. Swearingen also painted religious scenes, though these were not as popular with clients. His “simple yet sophisticated” paintings are “characterized by multiple perspectives and rhythmic lines.” His distinctive lines were made possible because Swearingen never cleaned his brushes, which resulted in a mix of colors ranging from “very fresh in some paintings, to very muddy in others.”

== Selected Collections ==
- Chappell Hill Historical Society Museum, Chappell Hill, TX
- Smithsonian American Art Museum, Washington DC
- The Menil Collection, Houston, TX
- Blanton Museum of Art, University of Texas, Austin, TX
- Fred Jones Jr. Museum of Art, University of Oklahoma, Norman, OK
- Art Museum of Southeast Texas, Beaumont, TX
