= Cadejé Airstrip =

Airstrip in Baja California Sur, Mexico

- IATA: none; ICAO: none

Summary
- Airport type: Private
- Operator: N/A
- Location: Cadejé
- Elevation AMSL: 237 ft / 72 m
- Coordinates: 26°22′15″N 112°30′49″W
- Interactive map of Cadejé Airstrip

Runways
Direction	Length		Surface
Direction	ft	m	Surface
03/21	2,583	787	Dirt

Cadejé Airstrip (IATA: N/A) is a private dirt airstrip located In Cadejé, 13 km North of San Juanico, Municipality of Comondú, Baja California Sur, Mexico. The airstrip is used solely for general aviation purposes. This airstrip is an alternative to the San Juanico airstrip (located on the Scorpion Bay coast), which remains closed. The letters CDJ are used as an identifier code. This airstrip is also known by government officials as "La Vinatería".
