= Jhony Peralta =

Peruvian politician

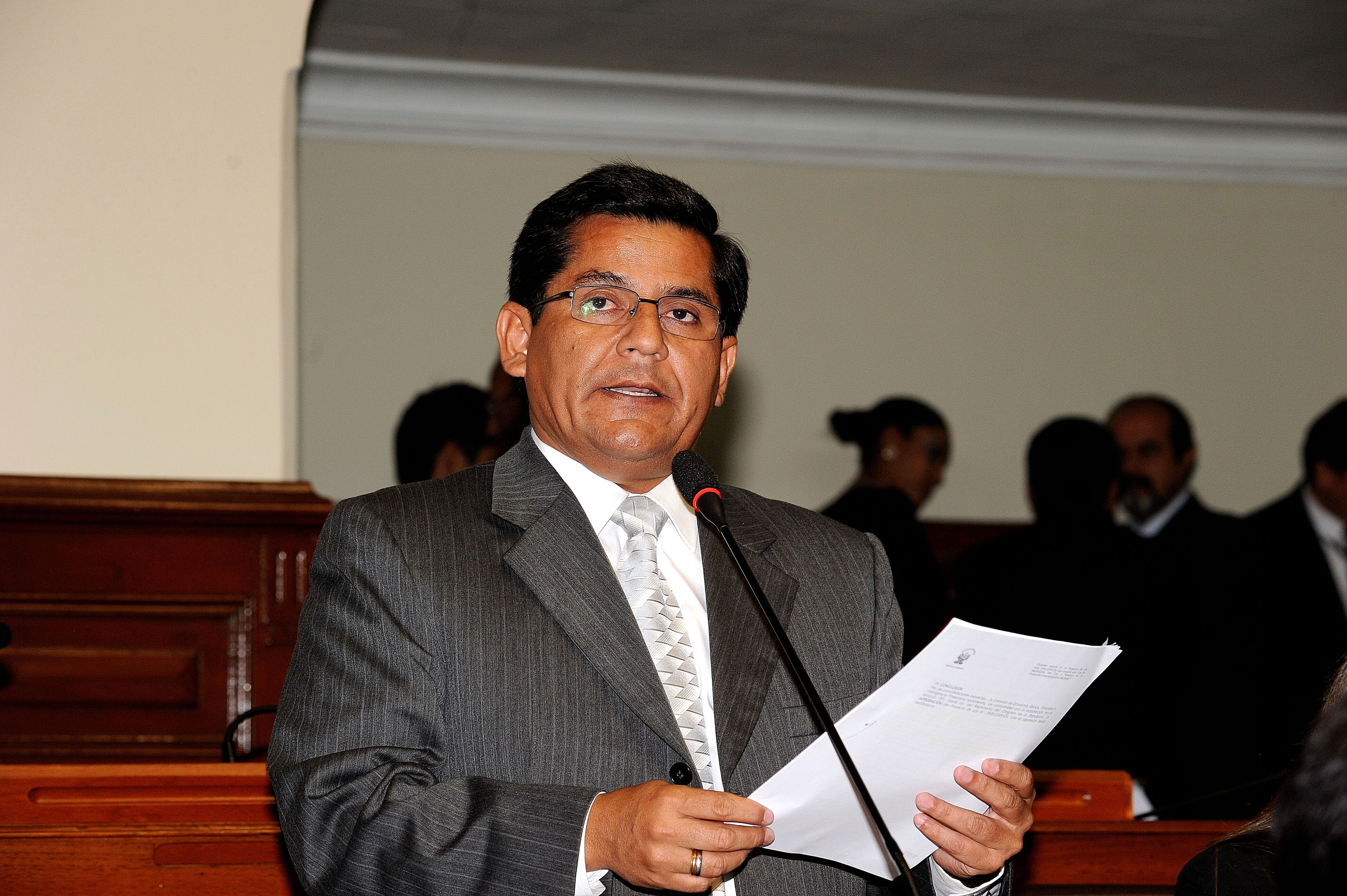
- Jhony Peralta Cruz

Member of Congress
- In office 26 July 2001 – 26 July 2011
- Constituency: Piura

Personal details
- Born: 4 November 1964 (age 61) Piura, Peru
- Party: Peruvian Aprista Party
- Occupation: Politician

Jhony Alexander Peralta Cruz (born 4 November 1964) is a Peruvian politician and a former Congressman representing Piura for the 2001–2006 term and the 2006–2011 term. Peralta lost his seat in the 2011 elections when he ran for re-election, but he was not re-elected as he attained a low number of votes. Peralta belongs to the Peruvian Aprista Party.
