= Jhony MC =

Brazilian rapper & YouTuber

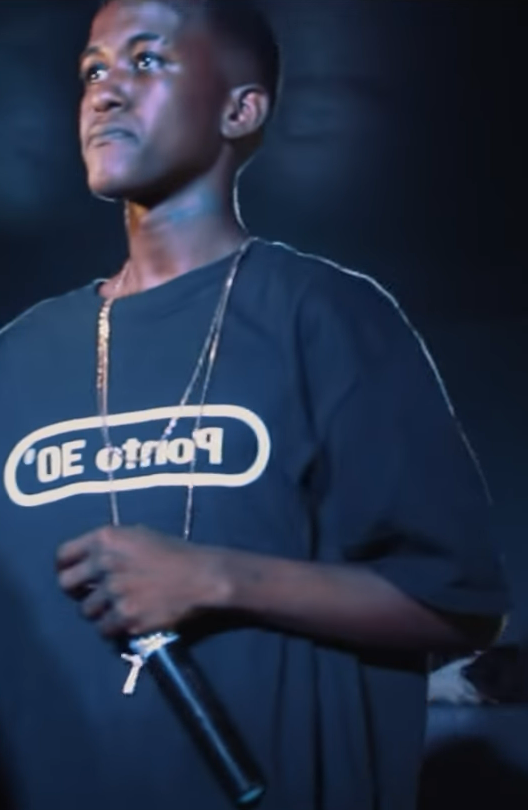

Background information
- Born: Jhonata Ferreira Sales; São Gonçalo, Rio de Janeiro, Brazil
- Genres: Hip hop
- Occupation: Singer-songwriter
- Instruments: Rapping
- Years active: 2016–present (solo)
- Label: Bagua Records

Jhony MC (born Jhonata Ferreira Sales in São Gonçalo, Rio de Janeiro) is a Brazilian rapper and YouTuber. He is known for his performances in freestyle Rap battles. Jhony gained national prominence through his appearances in events such as "Batalha da Aldeia" and "Batalha do Tanque", in addition to releasing original Hip-Hop music that blends lyricism with social critique.

== Biography ==
Jhony was born in the Paraíso neighborhood of São Gonçalo, where he grew up in an urban environment with strong musical influences. During his teenage years, he began participating in local cultural gatherings, developing his freestyle rapping skills. He rose to prominence after winning the "Rei do Tanque" (King of the Tank) edition of the Batalha do Tanque in 2015, defeating Orochi, with whom he shared both a friendship and a rivalry in freestyle battles. Since then, Jhony has been known as the "King of the Tank", a title held by his record as the competition's longest reigning champion. Years later, Orochi invited Jhony to perform a freestyle during his show at the Town music festival. In 2017, Jhony battled Zen MC, founder of Batalha do Museu, in an important MC battle in Rio de Janeiro.

After a period away from battle rap, during which he focused on a YouTube channel dedicated to musical reaction videos — which became one of the most prominent in the genre in Brazil — Jhony returned to the MC battle scene in 2022, participating in events such as "Batalha do Forte", "Coliseu", "Mar de Monstros", and "Batalha da Aldeia", where he notably won three consecutive editions. In addition to freestyle battles, Jhony was part of Baguá Records, and later he became affiliated with CMK Beats, collaborating with artists such as Xamã, Agnes Nunes, and Neo Beats. He also created the project "Jhony Convida", aimed at promoting MCs from the underground scene.

== Musical career ==
In 2020, Jhony released his first official EP, titled "Meu Nome É Jhony", under the Baguá Records label. The project was made available on digital platforms on March 19, 2020, featuring seven tracks and a total runtime of approximately 21 minutes. That same year, Jhony also released the song "F.A.B.", which was well received within the national Hip-Hop scene, reaching the Top 50 on Popload.

The EP presents a fusion of contemporary rap with more introspective elements, highlighting Jhony's lyrical identity. The tracks explore personal, social, and existential themes. The song "Negro" was featured in the educational project "Afro-Brazilian Literature from an Exceptional Perspective", developed by the Federal Institute of Southeast Minas Gerais.

=== Meu Nome É Jhony EP ===
Track	Name	Artist	Production
1	Negro	Jhony MC	CMK Beats
2	F.A.B.	Jhony MC	CMK Beats
3	Momentos	Jhony MC	CMK Beats
4	Quebra	Jhony MC	Samu
5	Pokas	Jhony MC	Samu
6	Meu Nome É Jhony	Jhony MC	Samu
7	Cobrança	Jhony MC featuring Xamã	CMK Beats
