= Johnnie Valentino =

American musician

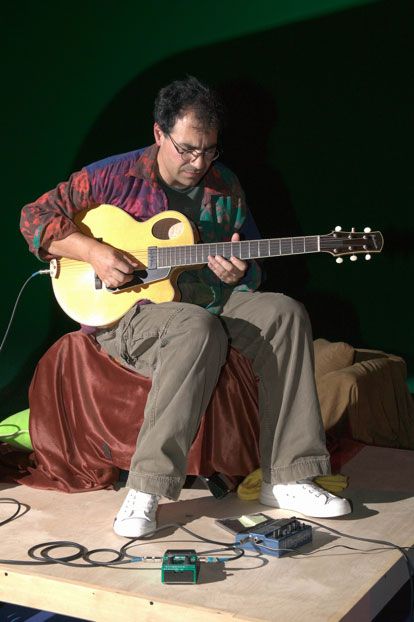
Johnnie Valentino

Johnnie Valentino is an American composer /guitarist and sound designer originally from Philadelphia who now lives in Los Angeles.

== Biography ==
Valentino spent his youth in a Philadelphia neighborhood that was filled with a history of great jazz guitarists that starts with Eddie Lang and continues through to a modern day virtuoso, Pat Martino. Valentino studied privately with Joe Sgro, Dennis Sandole and Pat Martino. In the late 70’s & early 80’s, Valentino studied music at Rutgers University while playing nightclubs and doing recording dates for Philly World Records at Alpha studios. In 1984 Valentino relocated to Los Angeles where he has been musically active in many facets of the arts such as composing, scoring, sound designing and performing, for films, TV, recordings, games and toy’s.

He has recorded with contemporary improvisers such as Pat Martino, Alex Acuna, Alan Pasqua, Kermit Driscoll, Billy Drewes, Mick Rossi, Vinny Golia, Bob Sheppard, Wadada Leo Smith, Michael Pedicin, Erik Friedlander, Mike Sarin, Bennie Maupin, Gerry Hemingway, Oscar Brashear, Luis Conte, Alphonso Johnson, Russ Johnson, Clayton Cameron, Andrew Sterman, Jim Ridl, Jimmy Haslip, Jon Gibson, Will Atrope & Justin Faulkner.

== Selected discography ==
=== As leader ===
- 1995 Goin' Public (Four Winds Entertainment)
- 1997 Free Exchange (Four Winds Entertainment)
- 2002 Searching Souls (Nine Winds)
- 2004 8 Shorts in Search of David Lynch (Omnitone)
- 2006 Duets with Ken Burgomaster (Secret Light)
- 2007 Stingy Brim (Omnitone)
- 2010 Asilo with Mick Rossi & Andrew Sterman (Secret Light)
- 2011 Bug Juice
- 2016 Sounds on the Edge of Silence (Secret Light)
- 2019 Resemblance (Art of Life Records)
- 2020 Fallout with Mick Rossi (Robot Love Records)
- 2021 Collective Thinking with Clayton Cameron
- 2024 Stray with Mick Rossi (Robot Love Records)

=== As producer/ composer/player ===
- 1994 Elissa Lala "Promises of the Heart" - Four Winds Entertainment
- 1998 Elissa Lala "Eternal Now" - Four Winds Entertainment
- 2007 Michael Pedicin Quintet on Jazzhut
- 2011 Michael Pedicin "Ballads Search For Peace" on Jazzhut
- 2012 Michael Pedicin Quintet "Live" on Jazzhut
- 2013 Michael Pedicin Quintet " Why Stop Now"
- 2015 American Girl "Love from Morning to Night"
- 2018 Michael Pedicin Quintet " As It Should Be"

=== As a Guitarist on #1 R&B hits ===
- 1983 Eugene Wilde - Gotta Get You Home Tonight - Philly World Records
- 1993 Foxy Brown- Gotta Get You Home MCA/Zebra
- 1982 Cashmere - Do It Anyway You Wanna - Zafiro/ Philly World Records

=== Film & TV Scores ===
Bonnie & Clyde The True Story, Modern Marvels /The Time Machine Series Intimate Portraits, Monuments to Freedom Series, Emergency Call, Portrait of Courage, Strange Wilderness, Lifestyles of the Rich and Famous, World's Greatest Magic Show's 1, 2, & 3, Houdini, Hunter's Blood, Dangerous Curves, Iron Triangle Kids Incorporated, First and Ten, Elephant's Diary and The Education of Alison Tate. Played guitar on films: Dirty Dancing, Entrapment, The Hurricane, Wonder Boys and In Too Deep, with composer Kenneth Burgomaster, Hannah Montana, Go Figure, Max Steel, A.N.T. Farm songs, Boxcar Children movie "The Swap" and in 2018 Boxcar Children movie "Surprise Island". Currently in 2018 composing for Mattel's Barbie Vlog.

=== Sound Design for Film & TV ===
Digimon, The Avengers, X-Men, Alvin and the Chipmunks, The New Archies, Creepy Crawlers, C.O.P.S, Camp Candy, Family Dog, Kid & Play, Monster Farm, Pigs Next Door, Power Rangers, The New Captain Kangaroo Show, Mr. Moose Fun Time, Mad Scientist Club, The New Mr. Bill Show, Breaker High, Pizza Cats, Prey of the Chameleon, Blind Vision and Hidden Rage.

=== Commercials ===
Tumblin Monkeys, Parrot Pile Up, Greedy Gator, Chameleon Crunch, Nike MaxAir American Girl's - Julie, Samantha, Maryellen & Grace Zoom & Crawl Monster | Fisher-Price Fisher-Price® Think & Learn Teach 'n Tag Movi
