= Johnson (given name) =

Johnson is a masculine given name. It is a patronym of the given name John and literally means "son of John". Notable people with the name include:

- J. Kwabena Asamoah-Gyadu, Ghanaian academic
- Johnson Bademosi (born 1990), American football player
- Johnson N. Camden (1828–1908), US Senator from West Virginia
- Johnson N. Camden Jr. (1865–1942), US Senator from Kentucky, son of the above
- Johnson Charles (born 1989), West Indies cricketer
- Johnson Gwaikolo (1955–2024), Liberian politician
- Johnson Hagood (1873–1948), US Army major general
- Johnson Hagood (1829–1898), Confederate Army brigadier general and 80th Governor of South Carolina, uncle of the above
- Johnson Macaba (born 1978), Angolan footballer
- Johnson Sherrick (1841-1914), American politician and businessman from Ohio
- Johnson Simpers (1793–1887), American politician from Maryland
- Johnson C. Smith (1844–1919), American businessman
