= Johnnie Roebuck =

American educator and politician (born 1942)

Member of the Arkansas House of Representatives
- In office 2007–2013
- Preceded by: Tommy Roebuck

Personal details
- Born: Johnnie J. Roebuck; December 7, 1942 (age 83) Clarksdale, Mississippi
- Party: Democratic
- Spouse: Tommy Roebuck
- Education: Bobo High School

Johnnie J. Roebuck (born December 7, 1942) is a retired educator and former politician in Arkansas. She succeeded her second husband Tommy Roebuck in the Arkansas House of Representatives serving from 2007 to 2013.

== Biography ==
Johnnie Patricia Jones was born in Clarksdale, Mississippi. She graduated from Bobo High School in 1960.

She lived in Arkedelphia, was a Democrat, and belonged to the Presbyterian Church. In 2011 she was Majority Leader in the Arkansas House.

She was interviewed by Lindsley Armstrong Smith on June 20, 2012, for the “Women in the Arkansas General Assembly” series at the David and Barbara Pryor Center for Arkansas Oral and Visual History at the University of Arkansas, Fayetteville. The University of Arkansas at Little Rock Center for Arkansas History and Culture in Little Rock, Arkansas has a collection of her papers.
