= Blue men of the Minch =

Scottish mythological creatures

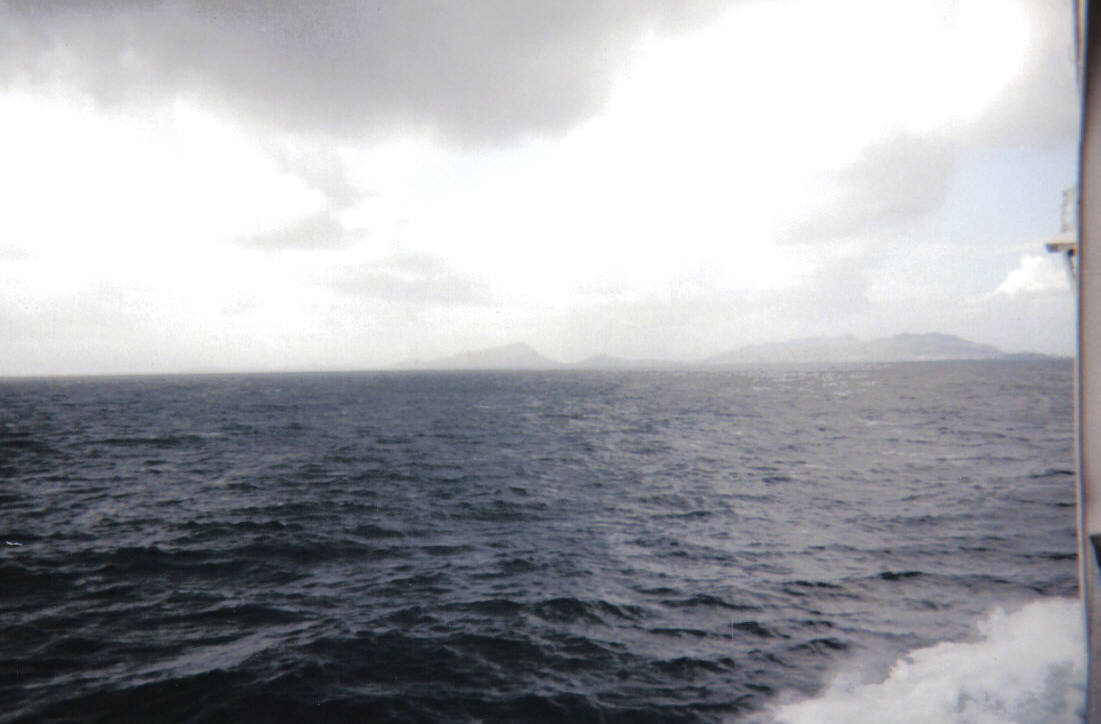
The Little Minch, home to the blue men

The blue men of the Minch, also known as storm kelpies (Scottish Gaelic: na fir ghorma Scottish Gaelic pronunciation: [nə fiɾʲ ˈɣɔɾɔmə]), are mythological creatures inhabiting the stretch of water between the northern Outer Hebrides and mainland Scotland, looking for sailors to drown and stricken boats to sink.

Apart from their blue colour, the mythical creatures look much like humans, and are about the same size. They have the power to create storms, but when the weather is fine they float sleeping on or just below the surface of the water. The blue men swim with their torsos raised out of the sea, twisting and diving as porpoises do. They are able to speak, and when a group approaches a ship its chief may shout two lines of poetry to the master of the vessel and challenge him to complete the verse. If the skipper fails in that task then the blue men will attempt to capsize his ship.

Suggestions to explain the mythical blue men include that they may be a personification of the sea, or originate with the Picts, whose painted bodies may have given the impression of men raising themselves out of the water if they were seen crossing the sea in boats that might have resembled kayaks. The genesis of the blue men may alternatively lie with the North African slaves the Vikings took with them to Scotland, where they spent the winter months close to the Shiant Isles in the Minch.

== Etymology ==
The Minch, a strait that separates the northwest Highlands of Scotland and the northern Inner Hebrides from the northern Outer Hebrides, is home to the blue men. The Scottish Gaelic terms for the blue men is na fir ghorma (in the genitive fear gorm, for example sruth nam fear gorm "the stream of the blue men").

The blue men are also styled as storm kelpies. The most common water spirits in Scottish folklore, kelpies are usually described as powerful horses, but the name is attributed to several different forms and fables throughout the country. The name kelpie may be derived from the Scottish Gaelic calpa or cailpeach, meaning "heifer" or "colt".

== Folk beliefs ==
=== Description and common attributes ===
The mythical blue men may have been part of a tribe of "fallen angels" which split into three; the first became the ground-dwelling fairies, the second evolved to become the sea-inhabiting blue men, and the remainder the "Merry Dancers" of the Northern Lights in the sky. The legendary creatures are the same size as humans but, as the name implies, blue in colour. Writer and journalist Lewis Spence thought they were the "personifications of the sea itself" as they took their blue colouration from the hue of the sea. Their faces are grey and long in shape and some have long arms, which are also grey, and they favour blue headgear; at least one account claims they also have wings. The tempestuous water around the Shiant Isles 19 kilometres (12 mi) to the north of Skye, an area subject to rapid tides in all weathers, flows beside the caves inhabited by the blue men, a stretch of water known as the Current of Destruction owing to the number of ships wrecked there.

Although other storm kelpies are reported as inhabiting the Gulf of Corrievreckan, described by poet, writer, and folklorist Alasdair Alpin MacGregor as "the fiercest of the Highland storm kelpies", the blue men are confined to a very restricted area. According to Donald A. Mackenzie they have no counterparts elsewhere in the world or even in other areas of Scotland; such limited range is rare for beliefs in spirits and demons. Folklorist and Tiree minister John Gregorson Campbell says they were unknown in Argyll on the nearby coast of the mainland for instance, although Church of Scotland minister John Brand, who visited Quarff in Shetland in mid-1700, recounts a tale of what may have been a blue man in the waters around the island. In the form of a bearded old man it rose out of the water, terrifying the passengers and crew of a boat it was following.

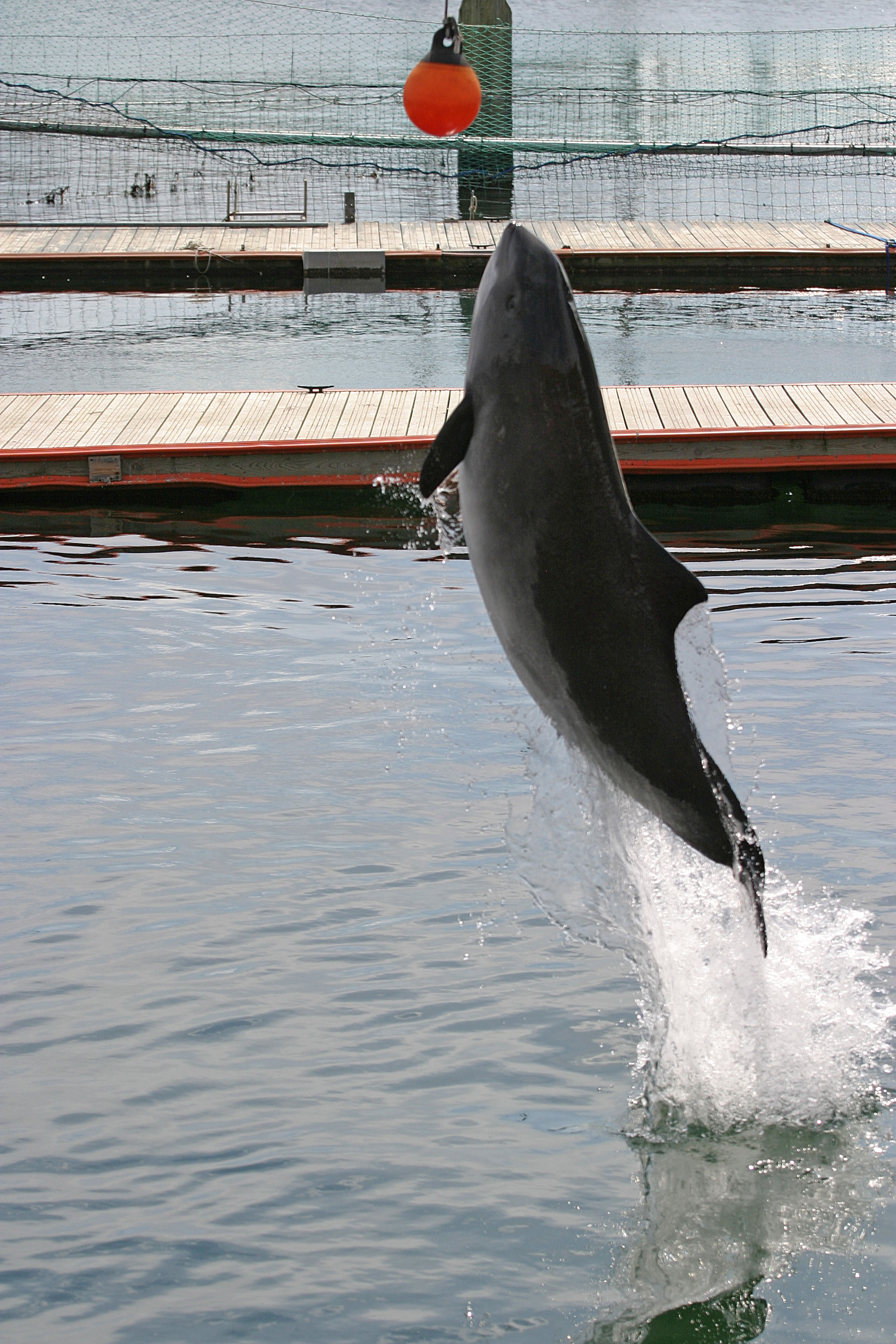
The blue men are said to twist and dive like porpoises (harbour porpoise pictured jumping from the water).

In traditional tales the blue men have the power to create severe storms, but when the weather is fine they sleep or float just under the surface of the water. They swim with their torso from the waist upwards raised out of the sea, twisting and diving in a similar way to a porpoise. To amuse themselves the creatures play shinty when the skies are clear and bright at night. They are able to speak and converse with mariners and are especially vocal when soaking vessels with water spray, roaring with laughter as vessels capsize.

When the blue men gather to attack passing vessels their chief, sometimes named as Shony, rises up out of the water and shouts two lines of poetry to the skipper, and if he cannot add two lines to complete the verse the blue men seize his boat. Mackenzie highlights the following exchange between the skipper of a boat and the chief of the blue men:

Blue Chief: Man of the black cap what do you say
As your proud ship cleaves the brine?
Skipper: My speedy ship takes the shortest way
And I'll follow you line by line
Blue Chief: My men are eager, my men are ready
To drag you below the waves
Skipper: My ship is speedy, my ship is steady
If it sank, it would wreck your caves.

The quick responses took the blue chief by surprise; defeated and unable to do any damage to the vessel, the blue men returned to their underwater caves, allowing the vessel free passage through the strait. The blue men may alternatively board a passing vessel and demand tribute from its crew, threatening that if it is not forthcoming they will raise up a storm.

=== Capture and killing ===
No surviving tales mention attempts to kill the spirits, but a Gregorson Campbell story tells of the capture of a blue man. Sailors seize a blue man and tie him up on board their ship after he is discovered "sleeping on the waters". Two fellow blue men give chase, calling out to each other as they swim towards the ship:

Duncan will be one, Donald will be two
Will you need another ere you reach the shore?

On hearing his companions' voices the captured spirit breaks free of his bonds and jumps overboard as he answers:

Duncan's voice I hear, Donald too is near
But no need of helpers has strong Ian More.

Sailors thus believed all blue men have names by which they address each other.

== Origins ==
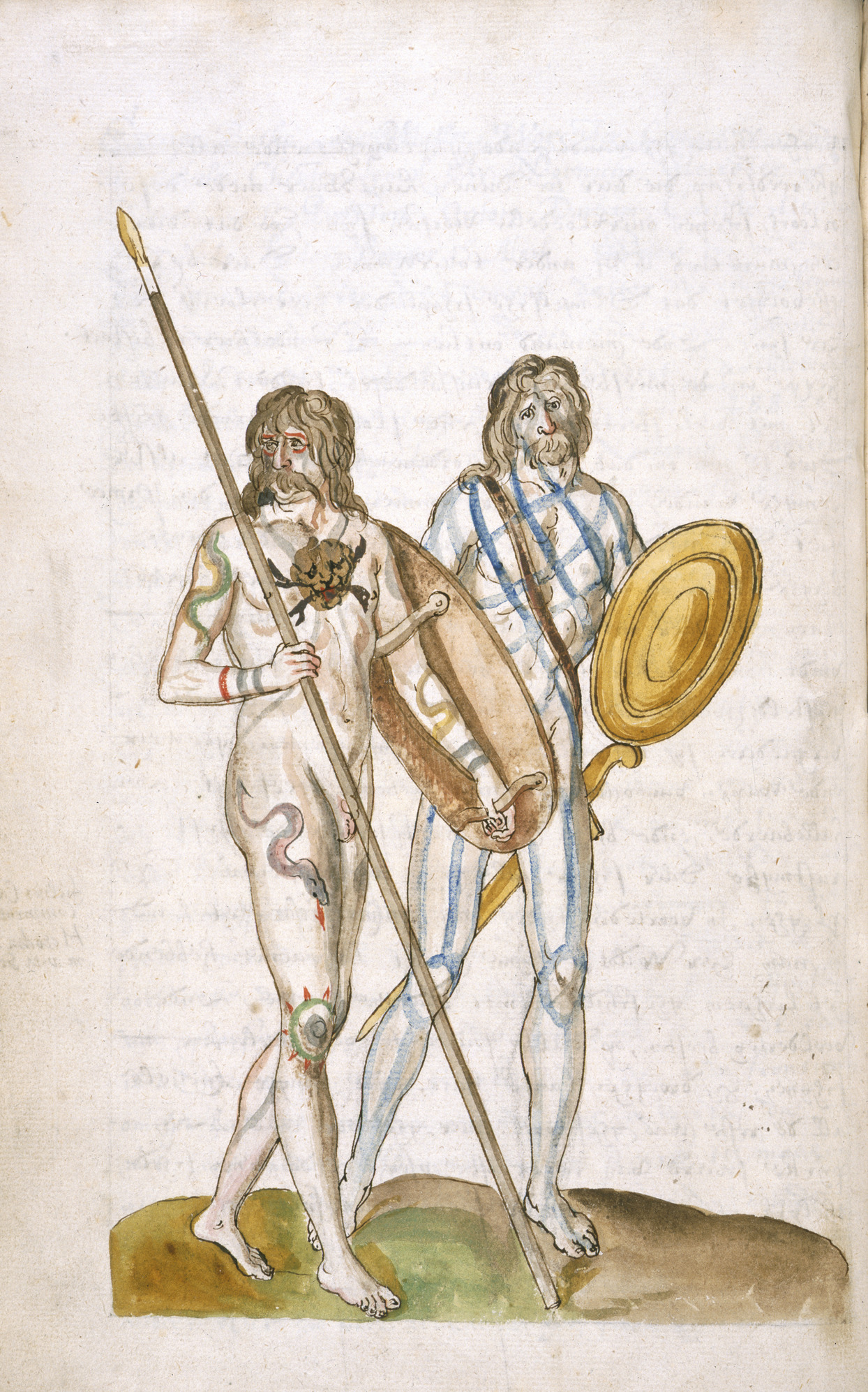
Art of ancient Britons, drawn c. 1574, with men with tattoos and skin painted with woad. The Picts may be the inspiration for the Blue Men.

Mackenzie's explanation of the legend of the blue men was based partly on research into the Annals of Ireland and goes back to the times of Harald Fairhair, the first Norse king, and his battles against the Vikings. The Scottish Gaelic term fir ghorma, meaning "blue men", is the descriptor for a black man according to Dwelly. Thus sruth nam fear gorm, one of the blue men's Gaelic names, literally translates as "stream of the blue men", or "river, tide or stream of the black man". Around the 9th century the Vikings took Moors they had captured and were using as slaves to Ireland. The Vikings spent winter months near the Shiant Isles, and Mackenzie attributes the story of the blue men to "marooned foreign slaves". He quotes an excerpt from historian Alan Orr Anderson's Early sources of Scottish history, A.D. 500 to 1286:

These were the blue men [fir gorma], because Moors are the same as negroes; Mauritania is the same as negro-land [literally, the same as blackness].

More recent newspaper reports have repeated Mackenzie's hypothesis. Historian Malcolm Archibald agrees the legend originates from the days Norsemen had North African slaves, but speculates that the myth may have originated with the Tuareg people of Saharan Africa, who were known as the "blue men of the desert".

The origin of the blue men of the Minch may alternatively lie with "tattooing people" specifically the Picts, whose Latin name picti means "painted people". If they were seen crossing the water in boats resembling the kayaks of the Finn-men they may have given simple islanders and mariners the impression of the upper part of the body rising out of the water.

== See also ==
- Kelpie
- Water bull
