= Pedro Obama =

Equatoguinean footballer (born 1987)

Personal information
- Full name: Pedro Ndong Obama
- Date of birth: 11 November 1987 (age 38)
- Position: Midfielder

Senior career*
Years	Team	Apps	(Gls)
–2015	The Panthers FC		
2015–2016	Racing de Micomeseng		

International career^{‡}
2010	Equatorial Guinea	2	(0)
- * Club domestic league appearances and goals ‡ National team caps and goals as of 5 November 2019

Pedro Obama (born 11 November 1987) is an Equatoguinean former footballer who played as a midfielder.
