= Johnathon =

Johnathon is a given name. It is an alternate spelling of Jonathan. It may refer to:

- Johnathon Schaech (born 1969), American actor
- Johnathon Ford (born 1989), Australian rugby league footballer
- Johnathon Jones (born 1988), American former professional basketball player
- Johnathon Banks (born 1982), American former professional boxer
