= Johnnie van Gent =

South African water polo player

Personal information
- Nationality: South African
- Born: 6 August 1930; Johannesburg, South Africa

Sport
- Sport: Water polo

Johnnie van Gent (born 6 August 1930, died between 2017 and 2019) was a South African water polo player. He competed in the men's tournament at the 1952 Summer Olympics.
