= San Juanico Airstrip =

Dirt airstrip in Baja California Sur, Mexico

- IATA: none; ICAO: none

Summary
- Airport type: Public
- Operator: N/A
- Location: San Juanico
- Elevation AMSL: 69 ft / 21 m
- Coordinates: 26°15′39″N 112°29′10″W
- Interactive map of San Juanico Airstrip

Runways
Direction	Length		Surface
Direction	ft	m	Surface
09/27	3,350	1,021	Soil

San Juanico Airstrip (IATA: N/A) is a public dirt airstrip located in San Juanico, Municipality of Comondú, Baja California Sur, Mexico, a town located on the Pacific Ocean coast, which is a famous surfing area better known as "Scorpion Bay". The airstrip is used solely for general aviation purposes, but now is closed, so the Cadejé Airstrip is used as an alternative.
