= San Juanito =

San Juanito may refer to:

- San Juanito, Meta, Colombia
- San Juanito de Escobedo, Mexico
- San Juanito, Chihuahua, a town in Bocoyna Municipality, Chihuahua, Mexico
- San Juanito (music genre), a genre in Andean music

== See also ==
- Juanito, a given name
- San Juan (disambiguation)
