= Seonaidh =

Water spirit from Scottish folklore

The Seonaidh (anglicised Shony or Shoney) was a water spirit in Lewis, according to Martin Martin.

Dwelly defines seonadh (without the "i", a related form in Scottish Gaelic) as "1. augury, sorcery. 2. Druidism" and quotes Martin further.

Martin says that the inhabitants of Lewis used to propitiate Seonaidh by a cup of ale in the following manner. They came to the church of St. Mulway (Mael rubha), each man carrying his own provisions. Every family gave a pock (bag) of malt, and the whole was brewed into ale. One of their number was chosen to wade into the sea up to his waist, carrying in his hand the cup full of ale. When he reached a proper depth, he stood and cried aloud:

Seonaidh, I give thee this cup of ale, hoping that thou wilt be so good as to send us plenty of seaware [seaweed used as a fertilizer] for enriching our ground during the coming year.

He then threw the ale into the sea, in a ceremony performed at night. On his coming to land, they all repaired to church, where there was a candle burning on the altar. There they stood still for a time, when, on a given signal, the candle was put out, and straight-away, they adjourned to the fields where the night was spent mirthfully over the ale. Next morning, they returned to their respective homes, in the belief that they had ensured a plentiful crop for the next season.

It seems likely that Seonaidh was originally some kind of god, whose worship had been lightly Christianised by the addition of various church features. However, it is also possible that Seonaidh, the Scottish Gaelic form of the English Johnny, may also be a reference to one of the Saints John.

== See also ==
- Hebridean myths and legends
