= CD Santa Eugenia =

Spanish football club

Santa Eugenia
- Full name: Club Deportivo Santa Eugenia
- Nickname: El Santa (the Saint)
- Founded: 1974
- Ground: Cerro Almodóvar; Madrid, Spain
- Capacity: 500
- League: Primera de Aficionados – Group 5
- 2024–25: Segunda de Aficionados – Group 18, 2nd of 15 (promoted)
- Website: http://www.elsanta.es
Home colours	Away colours

Club Deportivo Santa Eugenia is a football club in a little ward named Santa Eugenia, in the famous working-class district Villa de Vallecas. Santa Eugenia are playing currently in Primera de Aficionados – Group 5.

== History ==
In summer of 1974, many young boys lived in this new village, thought with all their neighbours, to create a football club. Finally, they built the team and they played their first Crespo Tournament in season 1974/75 and they began to play in Tercera Regional Ordinaria.

First year, CD Santa Eugenia played on home in an improvised terrain between Castrillo de Aza street and the railways. Next year, they built the actual pitch, with a bar, kiosko and two changing rooms. In 1976, they affiliated in the Castilian Football Association, with the number 1268.

In the 80/81 season, with Paco Valverde as manager, CD Santa Eugenia qualified for the Segunda de Aficionados. Eleven years later the club qualified again for the Primera de Aficionados and in the season 96/97 qualified for the Preferente, but in the season 05/06, was relegated in their actual division.

== Season to season ==
Season	Tier	Division	Place	Copa del Rey
1976–77	8	3ª Reg.	12th	
1977–78	9	3ª Reg.	10th	
1978–79	9	3ª Reg.	17th	
1979–80	9	3ª Reg.	10th	
1980–81	9	3ª Reg.	10th	
1981–82	9	3ª Reg.	13th	
1982–83	9	3ª Reg.	9th	
1983–84	9	3ª Reg.	10th	
1984–85	9	3ª Reg.	3rd	
1985–86	8	3ª Reg. P.	16th	
1986–87	8	3ª Reg.	1st	
1987–88	7	2ª Reg.	6th	
1988–89	7	2ª Reg.	14th	
1989–90	7	2ª Reg.	13th	
1990–91	7	2ª Reg.	6th	
1991–92	7	2ª Reg.	3rd	
1992–93	6	1ª Reg.	6th	
1993–94	6	1ª Reg.	12th	
1994–95	6	1ª Reg.	7th	
1995–96	6	1ª Reg.	2nd	

Season	Tier	Division	Place	Copa del Rey
1996–97	5	Reg. Pref.	13th	
1997–98	5	Reg. Pref.	3rd	
1998–99	5	Reg. Pref.	9th	
1999–2000	5	Reg. Pref.	8th	
2000–01	5	Reg. Pref.	16th	
2001–02	6	1ª Reg.	3rd	
2002–03	6	1ª Reg.	2nd	
2003–04	5	Reg. Pref.	13th	
2004–05	5	Reg. Pref.	10th	
2005–06	5	Reg. Pref.	16th	
2006–07	6	1ª Reg.	2nd	
2007–08	5	Reg. Pref.	16th	
2008–09	6	1ª Reg.	11th	
2009–10	6	1ª Afic.	2nd	
2010–11	5	Pref.	8th	
2011–12	5	Pref.	14th	
2012–13	5	Pref.	14th	
2013–14	5	Pref.	17th	
2014–15	6	1ª Afic.	18th	
2015–16	7	2ª Afic.	10th	

Season	Tier	Division	Place	Copa del Rey
2016–17	7	2ª Afic.	12th	
2017–18	7	2ª Afic.	5th	
2018–19	7	2ª Afic.	8th	
2019–20	7	2ª Afic.	15th	
2020–21	7	2ª Afic.	17th	
2021–22	9	3ª Afic.	2nd	
2022–23	8	2ª Afic.	12th	
2023–24	8	2ª Afic.	16th	
2024–25	9	2ª Afic.	2nd	
2025–26	8	1ª Afic.		

== Presidents ==
Year	President
1974–1977	Isidro Muñoz Martín.
1978–1980	Jacinto Moraleda Sama.
1981–1986	Manuel Llanes Rodriguez.
1987–1989	Luis Ortega Bustos.
1990-1990	José A. María Rubio.
1991-1991	Carlos Pérez Gómez.
1992–1993	José de Santiago Gómez.
1994–1997	Emilio Verdugo Sánchez.
1998–1999	Basilio Tomé Herrerin.
2000-	Salvador Angón Murado.

== Uniform ==
- Home Uniform: Green shirt, white shorts and green shocks.
- Away Uniform: Yellow shirt, green shorts and yellow shocks.
