= LGBTQ rights in Egypt =

- Egypt
- Legal status: De jure legal De facto illegal
- Penalty: Punishment up to 3 years with fines
- Gender identity: Sex reassignment surgery is allowed and can be performed in the country after obtaining approval from Al-Azhar Mosque or the Coptic Orthodox Church of Alexandria.
- Military: No
- Discrimination protections: None

Family rights
- Recognition of relationships: No recognition of same-sex relationships
- Adoption: No

Lesbian, gay, bisexual, transgender, and queer (LGBTQ) people in Egypt face severe challenges not experienced by non-LGBTQ residents. There are reports of widespread discrimination and violence towards openly LGBTQ people within Egypt, with police frequently prosecuting gay and transgender individuals.

Contemporary Egyptian law does not explicitly criminalize same-sex sexual acts. Instead, the state used several morality provisions for the de facto criminalization of homosexual conduct. Any behavior, or the expression of any idea that is deemed to be immoral, scandalous or offensive to the teachings of a recognized religious leader, may be prosecuted using these provisions. These public morality and public order laws have been used to target the LGBTQ community.

== History of homosexuality and legality of same-sex sexual activity ==
=== History of homosexuality in ancient Egypt ===
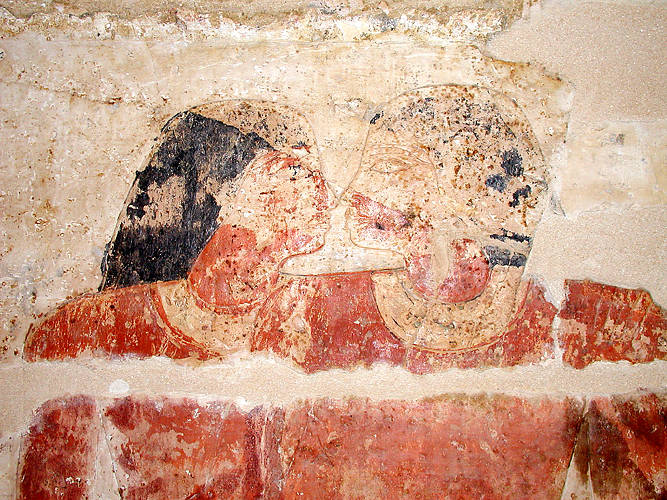
Khnumhotep and Niankhkhnum kissing

According to common interpretations of the Torah, Leviticus 18:3 alludes to the practice that ancient Egypt permitted two women or two men to marry each other. The best-known case of possible homosexuality in ancient Egypt is that of the two high officials Khnumhotep and Niankhkhnum. Both men lived and served under pharaoh Niuserre during the 5th Dynasty (c. 2494–2345 BC). Niankhkhnum and Khnumhotep each had families of their own with children and wives, but when they died their families apparently decided to bury them together in one and the same mastaba tomb. In this mastaba, several paintings depict both men embracing each other and touching their faces nose-on-nose. These depictions leave plenty of room for speculation, because in ancient Egypt the nose-on-nose touching normally represented a kiss.

Egyptologists and historians disagree about how to interpret the paintings of Niankhkhnum and Khnumhotep. Some scholars believe that the paintings reflect an example of homosexuality between two married men and prove that the ancient Egyptians accepted same-sex relationships. Other scholars disagree and interpret the scenes as an evidence that Niankhkhnum and Khnumhotep were twins, even possibly conjoined twins. No matter which interpretation is correct, the paintings show at the very least that Niankhkhnum and Khnumhotep must have been very close to each other in life as in death.

It remains unclear, what exact view the ancient Egyptians fostered about homosexuality. Any document and literature that actually contains sexual orientated stories, never name the nature of the sexual deeds, but instead uses stilted and flowery paraphrases. While the stories about Seth and his sexual behavior may reveal rather negative thoughts and views, the tomb inscription of Niankhkhnum and Khnumhotep may instead suggest that homosexuality was likewise accepted. Ancient Egyptian documents never clearly say that same-sex relationships were seen as reprehensible or despicable. No ancient Egyptian document mentions that homosexual acts were set under penalty. Thus it was very likely tolerated, as there has never been proof suggesting otherwise.

The Roman Emperor Constantine in the 4th century AD is said to have exterminated a large number of "effeminate priests" based in Alexandria.

=== Coptic Egypt ===
The 6th- or 7th-century Ashmolean Parchment AN 1981.940 provides the only example in Coptic language of a love spell between men. This vellum leaf contains an incantation by a man named Apapolo, the son of Noah, to compel the presence and love of another man Phello, the son of Maure. Phello will be restless until he finds Apapolo and satisfies the latter's desire.

=== Medieval Islamic Egypt ===
Sunni Islam eventually supplanted Christianity as the dominant religion of Egypt in the centuries following the Muslim conquest of Egypt. Alongside Sunni Islam came a new ruling class: the Arabs, and later, the Mamluks. The cultural dialogue on homosocial and homosexual behaviors in medieval Egypt was usually critical. The native Egyptian population was tolerant of homosexual behaviors, and discussion of the matter was usually spearheaded by legalistic Islamic scholars from the Muslim ruling class. The Western concept of a homosexual, as presently understood, did not exist in medieval Egypt. Words describing homosexual-adjacent acts/behaviors described actions, and not a group of people. Furthermore, there is a lack of historically recorded evidence on homosexuality in Egypt until the 8th century: this marks the entrance of boy-love poetry into the historical record.

The existence of homosexual behaviors in the interim period shortly after the Muslim conquest is not in doubt, however. Medieval Egyptian society, though a Muslim society, did not by default share the same outlook on masculinity, homosexuality, and homoerotic behavior as other lands conquered by the Rashidun Caliphate, especially where Islam's influence was weaker. The cultural norms of homosexuality in medieval Egypt were in line with those of the Eastern Mediterranean; top-down societal pressure from Islam did cause these behaviors to be scrutinized more heavily than they were before, especially by religious officials. Coptic Christianity's interaction with Islam fostered a large Sufi mystic population, that, in turn, had its own cultural views on homoerotic behaviors, in the form of "gazing" at young men who were seen as earthly representations of the beauty of God. Sufi practices were attacked by religious conservatives and viewed as hotbeds of degeneracy.

Volney, a Frenchman who traveled through Egypt in the eighteenth century the later said of Egypt's ruling caste, the Mamluks: "They are, above all, addicted to that abominable wickedness which was at all times the vice of the Greeks ... It is difficult to account for this taste, when we consider that they all have women, unless we suppose they seek in one sex that poignancy of refusal which they do not permit the other." The practice described by Volney as "the vice of the Greeks" is known as pederasty, and this was a visible and tolerated expression of homosexual behaviors in both medieval Egypt and the historical Eastern Mediterranean. The introduction of Islam into the fold did not adversely impact this practice in the general public. In the Egyptian context, it was considered natural for older men to gaze upon younger men seen as desirable and beautiful, with some consideration given to their age, though not always. This attraction to male youth was viewed as natural and compatible with traditional Muslim gender roles; in that regard, pederasty was as natural as heterosexuality. Arab and Turkish poems dedicated to various beautiful young men began to appear in the 8th century in various Muslim countries, including medieval Egypt. The presence of homoerotic literature demonstrates the tolerance of certain same-sex behaviors in Arab and Muslim societies at large, with some cultural differences depending on the country in question. The prevalence of homoerotic behaviors in medieval Egyptian society as they pertain to men who already had wives was a topic of rigorous debate among religious authorities, though it was culturally tolerable in medieval Egypt. Islamic law on the matter of same-sex sexual activity was further expanded after the explosion of homoerotic narratives across the Muslim world in the 8th century. Medieval Egyptian society was tolerant of homosocial, homoerotic, and homosexual behaviors and acts; religious authorities were not. Islamic law tolerated a smaller subsection of behaviors (pederasty), for a time, and described certain acts as deeply dangerous to society and repugnant to the faith. Islam was discouraging of homosexual behaviors and non traditional gender roles, while native Egyptian cultural practices were tolerant of a larger array of homosexual behaviors, acts, and attractions. As such, it is best to consider the intersection of culture and religion at various moments in medieval Egyptian history when discussing the status of, by Western standards, LGBTQ individuals in medieval Egyptian society.

=== 19th and mid-20th centuries ===
During the 19th century, homosocial and homosexual relations were generally seen as normal in Egyptian society. One notable expression of gender nonconformity came in the form of the khawalat; male cross-dressing dancers who performed in public celebrations. It was typical for khawalat to take the place of female dancers. The kwahal were seen as acceptable substitutes for dancing women, who were restricted at the time due to concerns over men's health. In modern day, the term khawalat has been stigmatized and used as a derogatory term for passive and gay men.

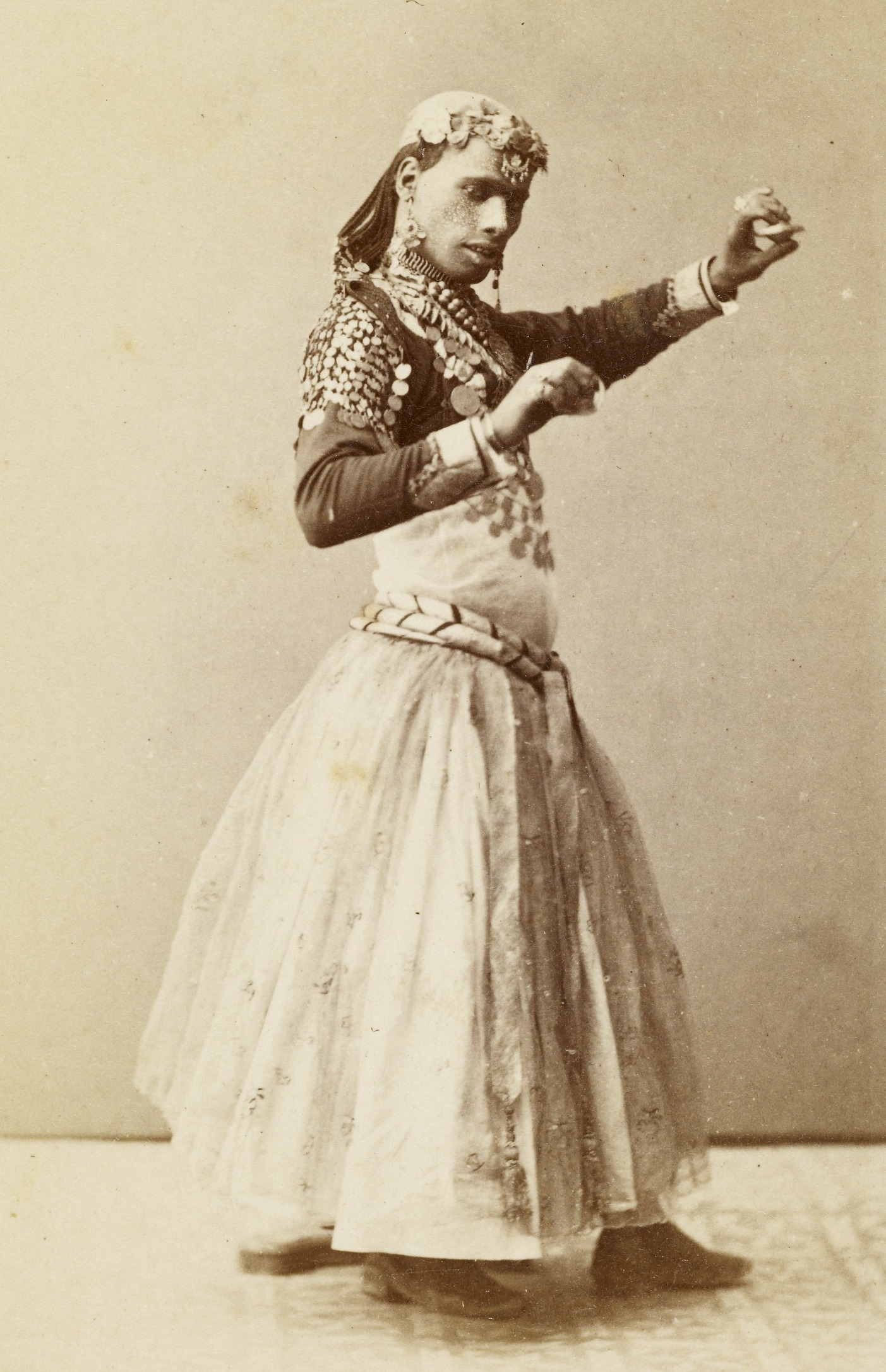
A khawal dancer in a female costume (c. 1870)

French novelist Gustave Flaubert wrote a letter to a friend in 1850 in which Flaubert wrote how he was shocked by the overall normality and acceptance of homosexuality in Egypt; noting that the subject was freely admitted and discussed in public. The same was true in 1931 according to writer Faraj Fakhri, who stated:

"There is no need to mention any details on homosexuality in these places, since a reader who knows even a little of sexual life in ‘the city’ would understand very well what I am talking about."

Activist Scott Long notes that "Egypt's criminalization of consensual, non-commercial sex between men arose partly out of, and partly in reaction to, the colonial regulation of female sex work." In 1883, Khedive Tewfik introduced a legal code in Egypt, which had been occupied by the British a year earlier. The code was modelled after the Napoleonic Code, the civil code introduced by Napoleon Bonaparte in France in 1804, and in part regulated the condition of female prostitutes in Egypt by requiring them to be subject to regular medical examinations, which remained in force until 1949. Political resistance in Egypt to the occupation soon targeted the Egyptian prostitution system, due to the solicitation of prostitutes by British troops and the "privileged status enjoyed by foreign prostitutes over Egyptians", which contributed to "prostitution's association with political subjugation." As noted by Long,

In 1949 a special committee of the House of Representatives (then the lower house of parliament) began studying the draft of the first anti-prostitution law in Egypt. The committee's report recommended introducing the term fujur [debauchery] as a criminalized conduct. It urged adding the word "so the text [can] include male prostitution, since the word di`ara [prostitution] only referred to female prostitution."

An extension to the law in 1951 defined prostitution as "the practice of vice with others with no distinction." As Long notes, "In the absence of the monetary element, the definition in effect criminalized consensual "promiscuity" in general, rendering exchange of money for sex irrelevant."

The inhabitants of the Siwa Oasis, which have been noted by historians to have been historically accepting of homosexuality, were subject to several studies by anthropologists during the early 20th century. German egyptologist Georg Steindorff explored the Oasis in 1900 and reported that homosexual relations were common and often extended to a form of marriage: "The feast of marrying a boy was celebrated with great pomp, and the money paid for a boy sometimes amounted to fifteen pounds, while the money paid for a woman was a little over one pound." Mahmud Mohammad Abd Allah, writing of Siwan customs for the Harvard Peabody Museum in 1917, commented that although Siwan men could take up to four wives, "Siwan customs allow a man but one boy to whom he is bound by a stringent code of obligations." In the late 1940s, a Siwan merchant told visiting British novelist Robin Maugham that the Siwan women were "badly neglected", but that Siwan men "will kill each other for boy. Never for a woman", although as Maugham noted, marriage to a boy had become illegal by then.

The Free Officers' Revolution of 1952 had empowered the Egyptian military and security forces, becoming a deep state with their own agenda. Such forces operated independently from the bureaucracy, judiciary, Mubarak regime, and private sector. The Egyptian military had developed its own network of business enterprises during the industrialization age. The military promoted conservative views on sexuality and gender identity, weaponizing homophobia during times of unrest.

=== Mubarak regime ===
During the rule of Hosni Mubarak, the Egyptian government did not support LGBTQ-rights legislation at home and objected to attempts, starting in the 1990s, to have the United Nations include LGBTQ-rights within its human rights mission. While the Mubarak regime did not support LGBTQ rights, it did not enact an obvious ban on homosexuality or cross-dressing in the criminal code.

Criminal sanctions against gay and bisexual men tended to arise not from the penal code itself, but from a supplemental law, enacted in 1961, to combat prostitution.

The law against prostitution also bans "debauchery", even if the act did not involve trafficking or prostitution.

Egyptian courts interpreted the ban on debauchery to criminalize homosexual relations between consenting adults. Repeat offenders of the law can face even harsher punishment for what the law views as "habitual debauchery".

In addition to the law on prostitution, other public morality or order-based laws gave the police and judges significant leeway to jail or fine gay and bisexual men. While arrests had been periodically occurring under these laws for decades, a more systematic crackdown appeared to have begun in the early part of the twenty-first century.

Beginning in 2000, under Hosni Mubarak, these laws were used to engage in a more sophisticated and systematic crackdown on gay or bisexual men, or indeed anyone deemed by the government to be supportive of LGBTQ rights.

In 2000, police arrested an Egyptian gay couple and charged them with, "violation of honor by threat" and "practising immoral and indecent behavior". Their lawyer asked that the charges be dropped because homosexuality was not a crime, but the judge refused on the grounds that two men had in fact "offended" religious and moral standards. The incident became a media sensation, promoting various public figures to view homosexuality as a product of Western decadence and demand that the government execute homosexuals or send them to mental institutions to be reformed.

Within a year, the Egyptian government began a public crackdown on Egyptian gay men by raiding private parties, arresting the guests and charging them under the Prostitution and Debauchery law. This crackdown also saw the "Public Order and Public Morals" code being increasingly used to criminalize the sexuality of gay and bisexual men. The code, originally enacted in the 1990s to punish westernized students and liberal intellectuals, was now being used to punish gay and bisexual men.

The first of these raids was at a Cairo boat party, where all fifty-two gay men were arrested and charged with violating these vague public morality laws. The "Cairo 52" were arrested and tried on the original Prostitution and Debauchery law, as well as the newer Public Order and Public Morality code.

The impact of these laws on gay and bisexual men were brought to the world's attention by the Human Rights Watch.

It was during this time that Human Rights Watch published a report on the laws used by the Egyptian government to criminalize homosexuality, the history of the laws, use of torture against gay and bisexual men by the police, and how such laws violate international human rights standards.

The Cairo 52 were defended by international human rights organizations such as Human Rights Watch, and Amnesty International. However, they had no organized internal support, pleaded innocent, and were tried under the state security courts. Members of the German parliament and the French President called upon the Egyptian government to respect the human rights of its LGBTQ citizens. Twenty-three of the defendants were sentenced to prison with hard labor, while the others were acquitted. More men have been arrested in various raids on homosexuals, although foreigners tend to be released quickly.

In many recent situations, men are being arrested for meeting or attempting to meet other adult men through various Internet chatrooms and message boards. Trans and gender non conforming people are also harassed this way. One such case, on 20 June 2003, when an Israeli tourist in Egypt was jailed for homosexuality for about fifteen days before he was eventually released and allowed to return home. On 24 September 2003, police set up checkpoints at both sides of the Qasr al-Nil Bridge, which spans the Nile in downtown Cairo and is a popular place for adult men to meet other men for sex, and arrested 62 men for homosexuality.

In 2004, a seventeen-year-old private university student received a 17 years' sentence in prison, including two years' hard labor, for posting a personal profile on a gay dating site.

The Egyptian government's response to the international criticism was either to deny that they were persecuting LGBTQ people or to defend their policies by stating that homosexuality is a moral perversion.

In 2009, Al Balagh Al Gadid, a weekly Egyptian newspaper was banned, and two of its reporters were jailed for printing a news article that accused high-profile Egyptian actors Nour El Sherif, Khaled Aboul Naga and Hamdi El Wazir of being involved in a sexual prostitution sex ring and in bribing government agents to cover up their involvement.

=== Post-Mubarak ===
The Egyptian revolution in 2011 provided a political momentum and space for LGBTQ organizing in Egypt that were exceptionally productive in terms of movement building. In the aftermath of the revolution, Egyptian LGBTQ individuals, activists and organizations started becoming more visible and more eager to be part of the changing political and social landscapes that seemed promising and empowering. Many of the emerging LGBTQ activists, back then, started mobilizing not only LGBTQ rights but other intersecting rights as well. Women's rights, Gender and sexuality rights, Indigenous people's rights, and civic rights were among the main intersecting struggles that shaped the LGBTQ activism in the post-revolution years. By 2013, a number of online campaigns to fight against homophobia and transphobia started going viral on a number of social media platforms such as Twitter and Facebook. No one can claim that such mobilization resulted in successes that a normative legal perspective could translate into legal reforms; however, it was because of such mobilization and the advocacy that resulted from it that defending the rights of people targeted based on their sexuality by the Egyptian state became more of a collective demand within Human Rights groups and organizations in Egypt. Also, thanks to the revolution, the Egyptian public sphere provided a space for the LGBTQ community, that even at the toughest moments of state sponsored crackdown, they still managed to claim it.

LGBTQ rights issues were not among the reforms demanded by many of the protesters or other dissidents during the 2011 revolution. The provisional constitution, approved by voters in March 2011, does not specifically address LGBTQ-rights and the Egyptian government continued to oppose to join the United Nations' "Joint Statement on Ending Acts of Violence Related Human Rights Violations Based on Sexual Orientation and Gender Identity", which called for an end to "acts of violence, criminal sanctions and related human rights violations committed against individuals because of their sexual orientation or gender identity".

In 2013, Egyptian comedian Bassem Youssef said on The Daily Show, in an interview with Jon Stewart, that he had been charged with "propagating and promoting homosexuality and obscenity" by the Morsi government.

In November 2014, eight men were sentenced to three years in prison for charges of spreading indecent images, following the circulation of a video of a gay marriage ceremony.

In December 2014, around 26 men were arrested in a public bathhouse (Hammam) after a TV presenter, Mona Iraqi, collaborated with the Egyptian police. The court acquitted them.

=== Rainbow Flags' incident ===
On 22 September 2017, a number of Egyptian youth raised rainbow flags as a way to advocate LGBTQ rights in Egypt, during a concert for the Lebanese band Mashrou' Leila that took place in Cairo. Shortly after the concert, images of the attendees went viral on social media and then on a number of Egyptian news websites. Starting from 23 September and for a number of days, Egyptian TV hosts such as Ahmed Moussa and Mohamed Al Gheity repeatedly incited violence against the LGBTQ community in general and against those who raised the flags in particular; moreover, they urged the Egyptian state to take immediate actions against anyone who was involved in the incident of raising the rainbow flags during the concert.

TV host Ahmed Moussa shared personal information of some of the individuals who raised the flags. As a consequence of this campaign, the Egyptian police began arresting a number of individuals based on their actual or perceived sexual orientations and gender identities from the streets, dating applications, and from their homes. Between 25 September and the end of November 2017, at least 84 people were arrested and many of them were subjected to forced anal tests. Two people arrested were accused of halting the rule of the constitution and disrupting the security of the state and society, a charge that would have had them imprisoned for 15 years. The two individuals, Sarah Hegazi and Ahmed Alaa, were detained for three months before being released on bail in January 2018.

The consequences of the rainbow flags' incident and the backlash that followed were comparable to those of Cairo 52. In addition to the numerous arrests, the crackdown by the Egyptian police, together with the Egyptian media, resulted in a state of trauma and despair among young Egyptian LGBTQ individuals, resulting in Hegazi, who had fled to Canada and was granted asylum, dying by suicide in 2020, along with many attempted suicides by a number of Egyptian LGBTQ youths. Egyptian LGBTQ individuals and activists are still recovering from the trauma of the backlash. Other Egyptian LGBTs had to leave the country because of the social and political threats. In January 2019, host Mohamed El Gheity was jailed one year for hosting a gay man on his TV show.

=== Current situation ===
A report published by Human Rights Watch elaborates upon the country's treatment towards LGBTQ people. Titled "Egypt: Security Forces Abuse, Torture LGBT People", the report's main findings include entrapment of LGBTQ people via social media platforms, prolonged detainment and torture of sexual and gender minorities in state custody. As stated by LGBTQ Rights Researcher Rasha Younes, even if legal charges are dismissed, any one accused for an LGBTQ-related offense could be ostracized from family or lose medical care and employment. Trans people often face medical neglect.

State officials and police routinely harass and abuse LGBTQ people, and specifically trans people, which leads to regular unfair arrests and further abuse by them in their custody.

== Recognition of same-sex relationships ==
Personal and family law in Egypt (e.g. the laws of marriage, divorce, and inheritance) are governed by the religious law of the person or persons in question. As the religious law of all officially recognized religions in Egypt (chief among them Islam and Coptic Orthodox Christianity) do not recognize homosexual relationships as legitimate, Egyptian law only recognizes a marriage between a man and a woman. Reports suggest that if such a relationship becomes public, the police may use it as evidence in a criminal indictment for the various laws against Satanism, prostitution and public immorality.

== Living conditions ==
Until 2001, the Egyptian government refused to recognize that homosexuality was the sexual identity for some of its residents, and after 2001, it only did so to brush off criticism from human rights organizations and foreign politicians.

Culturally, most Egyptian citizens are Muslim, which impacts prevailing social biases and attitudes. Traditional Islamic morality does not condone homosexuality. This is similarly seen within traditional Coptic Christian's morality's view on homosexuality. According to Pew Research Center, 95% of Egyptians believe that homosexuality should not be accepted by society.

=== Support for LGBTQ rights ===
Polling data suggests that only a minority of Egyptians support LGBTQ rights. This is why Egyptian political parties, human rights NGOs do not express public support for LGBTQ rights.

One of the few Egyptians to publicly support LGBTQ-rights has been Maher Sabry. Along with his human rights efforts on behalf of the Cairo 52, he also wrote a play on homophobia in Egypt and later directed the Egyptian film All My Life.

In August 2021, the Central Bank of Egypt was forced to confirm that rainbow holograms due to appear on new E£10 and E£20 banknotes were a secure watermarking feature to prevent counterfeiting, after online critics suggested it was a covert message of support for LGBTQ rights.

=== Cinema ===
Egyptian cinema, as the largest film industry in the Arab world, has portrayed queer characters since its beginnings, but almost exclusively in a mode of stereotyping and defamation. Early queer coding can be found as early as the 1930s in the films of director Togo Mizrahi, whose comedies, through the "queer" use of masquerade and mistaken identity, subverted dominant notions of race, gender, and nationality. One of the first explicit depictions of male homosexuality in modern Arabic literature, the character Kersha in Naguib Mahfouz's novel Midaq Alley (1947), was heavily toned down in the 1963 film adaptation; film critic Omar Hassan argues that his moral degradation in the film is coded as a consequence of Western influence.

Among the few serious portrayals of homosexual characters in mainstream cinema are Youssef Chahine's Alexandria trilogy, including the film Alexandria... Why? (1978) about a wealthy Egyptian man who has an affair with a British male soldier, as well as films by Yousry Nasrallah. A radical exception is Mohammed Shebl's Anyab ("Fangs," 1981). According to Basil Dababaneh, the film is a queer, "Egyptianized" remake of The Rocky Horror Picture Show. The film uses horror aesthetics to stage a critique of the neoliberal "good life."

Mohammed Shawky's film Shall I Compare You to a Summer's Day?", which premiered at the Berlinale 2022, tells a love story between two men set against the backdrop of One Thousand and One Nights and sparked a political scandal in Egypt, as a result of which lawyers demanded the revocation of the director's Egyptian citizenship.

=== Media ===
Media depictions of cross-dressing or homosexuality have been negative in keeping with the current cultural and religious values of most Egyptians. In 2017, the Supreme Media Regulatory Council issued an order preventing "the appearance of the homosexuals" or "promoting their slogans" on media.

In 1999, the public performance of a play by Maher Sabry, which explored homophobia, was shut down by the government after a few performances. In 2008, Sabry directed an award-winning independent film about an Egyptian gay man, which provoked protests from clerics and government officials who wanted the film banned, if not destroyed.

A weekly newspaper called the Al Balagh Al Gadid was shut down, two reporters jailed, for printing a story that accused Egyptian actors Nour El Sherif, Khaled Aboul Naga and Hamdi El Wazir of bribing police officers in order to cover up their involvement with homosexual prostitution.

== Clampdown on social networking ==
In August 2018, Al Sisi's government introduced legislation bringing any social network service user with more than 5,000 followers or subscribers under increased scrutiny, subjecting them to prosecution under media laws as part of a crackdown on "terrorism and political activity".

== Health ==
=== HIV/AIDS ===
The pandemic first reached Egypt in the 1980s, although public health effort were left to NGOs until the 1990s, when the government began to initiate policies and programs in response to the pandemic.

In 1996, the Health Ministry set up a national AIDS hotline. A 1999 Egypt Today cover story dealt with the AIDS-HIV pandemic in Egypt and the fact that it commonly seen as something caused by foreigners, homosexuals, or drug users. The article also mentioned that there was talk of an LGBTQ organization being created to target the Egyptian LGBTQ community, and while a same-sex safer sex brochure was published, the organization was never created and ignorance about the pandemic is common.

In 2005, the Egyptian government started to allow for confidential HIV testing, although most people fear that being tested positive will result in being labelled as a homosexual and thus a de facto criminal. Some Egyptians have access to home test kits brought back from the United States, but most Egyptians lack accurate information about the pandemic and quality care if they do become infected.

In 2007, the Egyptian government aired an educational film about HIV/AIDS in Egypt, with interviews from members of Health Ministry, doctors and nurses.

== Summary table ==
Same-sexual activity legal	No For men, “habitual” same-sex activity is illegal with punishment up to 3 years imprisonment with fines.
Equal age of consent	No
Anti-discrimination laws in employment only	No
Anti-discrimination laws in the provision of goods and services	No
Anti-discrimination laws in all other areas (Incl. indirect discrimination, hate speech)	No
Anti-discrimination laws in gender identity	No
Same-sex marriages	No
Same-sex civil unions	No
Recognition of same-sex couples	No
Step-child adoption by same-sex couples	No
Joint adoption by same-sex couples	No
Gays and lesbians allowed to serve openly in the military	No
Right to change legal gender	Yes / No By law, approval of religious authorities (Al-Azhar Mosque or the Coptic Orthodox Church of Alexandria) must be obtained prior to surgical intervention.
Access to IVF for lesbians	No
Commercial surrogacy for gay male couples	No (Illegal for all couples regardless of sexual orientation)
Commercial surrogacy for lesbian female couples	No (Illegal for all couples regardless of sexual orientation)
Automatic parenthood on birth certificates for children of same-sex couples	No
Conversion therapy banned for minors	No
MSMs allowed to donate blood	No

== See also ==
- Human rights in Egypt
- Bedayaa (LGBTQ organization based in Cairo)
- LGBTQ in the Middle East
- LGBTQ rights in Africa
- LGBTQ rights in Asia
