= Janet Baus =

American documentary filmmaker

- Occupations: film director, producer and editor

Janet Baus is an American documentary film and television director, producer and editor. In 1993, she co-directed Lesbian Avengers Eat Fire Too with Su Friedrich, about activist group the Lesbian Avengers. In 2003, she produced John Scagliotti's film Dangerous Living: Coming Out in the Developing World about gay and lesbian people in non-Western countries. She had worked with Scagliotti before, having a co-producer credit on his 1999 film After Stonewall. Her 2006 film Cruel and Unusual, co-directed with Dan Hunt and Reid Williams, was a documentary about pre-operative male-female transsexual women in men's prisons. It won the Michael J. Berg Documentary Award at the 2006 Frameline Film Festival and the Freedom Award at L.A. Outfest. Baus has also won the Cine Golden Eagle, the Vito Russo Award, the Chicago International Television Award and the Gold Aurora Award.

== Filmography ==
=== Director ===
- The Lesbian Avengers Eat Fire Too (1994) with Su Friedrich
- Cruel and Unusual (2006)

=== Producer ===
- Some Ground to Stand On (1998)
- After Stonewall (1999)
- Dangerous Living: Coming Out in the Developing World (2003)
- Cruel and Unusual (2006)
- In the Life (2007–2008)

== See also ==
- List of female film and television directors
- List of lesbian filmmakers
- List of LGBT-related films directed by women
