= 19th GLAAD Media Awards =

Annual US media awards ceremony

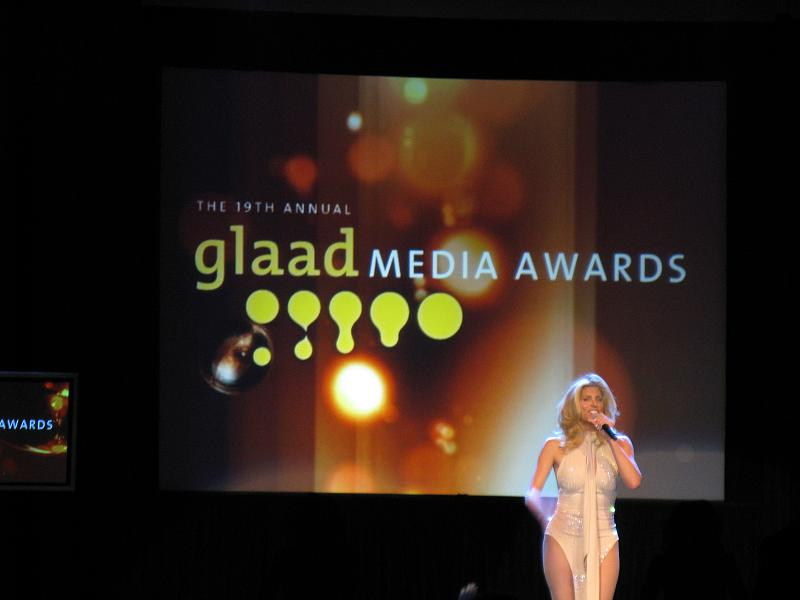
Presenter on stage at 19th GLAAD Media Awards

The GLAAD Media Awards were created in 1990 by the Gay & Lesbian Alliance Against Defamation (GLAAD) to "recognize and honor media for their fair, accurate and inclusive representations of the lesbian, gay, bisexual and transgender (LGBT) community and the issues that affect their deads."

Here, the nominees of the 19th GLAAD Media Awards, awarded in 2008, are listed. The winners are listed in bold type.

== Winners and nominees ==
Winners are presented in bold.

- Film - Wide Release
  - Across the Universe (Revolution Studios)
  - The Jane Austen Book Club (Sony Pictures Classics)
  - **Stardust** (Paramount Pictures)
- Film - Limited Release
  - **The Bubble** (Strand Releasing)
  - Dirty Laundry (Codeblack Entertainment)
  - Itty Bitty Titty Committee (Pocket Releasing)
  - Nina's Heavenly Delights (Regent Releasing)
  - Whole New Thing (Picture This! Entertainment)
- Drama Series
  - **Brothers & Sisters** (ABC)
  - Degrassi: The Next Generation (The N)
  - Dirty Sexy Money (ABC)
  - Greek (ABC Family)
  - The L Word (Showtime)
- Comedy Series
  - Desperate Housewives (ABC)
  - Exes and Ohs (Logo)
  - The Sarah Silverman Program (Comedy Central)
  - **Ugly Betty** (ABC)
  - The War at Home (Fox)
- Individual Episode (in a series w/o a regular LGBT character)
  - "Boy Crazy" - Cold Case (CBS)
  - **"Do Tell" - Boston Legal** (ABC)
  - "Free to Be You and Me" - Kyle XY (ABC Family)
  - "The Gangs of Camden County" - My Name is Earl (NBC)
  - "Sin" - Law & Order: SVU (NBC)
- Television Movie, Mini-Series or Anthology
  - Daphne (Logo)
  - **The DL Chronicles** (here!)
  - The State Within (BBC America)
- Documentary
  - Camp Out (Logo)
  - Cruel and Unusual: Transgender Women in Prison (WE tv)
  - **For the Bible Tells Me So** (First Run Features)
  - Freddie Mercury: Magic Remixed (VH1/Logo)
  - Small Town Gay Bar (Logo)
- Reality Program
  - "Chase/Lane" - Trading Spouses (Fox)
  - **Kathy Griffin: My Life on the D-List** (Bravo)
  - Project Runway (Bravo)
  - Who Wants to Be a Superhero? (SciFi Channel)
  - Work Out (Bravo)
- Daily Drama
  - All My Children (ABC)
  - **As the World Turns** (CBS)
- Talk Show Episode
  - **"Born in the Wrong Body" - The Oprah Winfrey Show**
  - "Gay Around the World" - The Oprah Winfrey Show
  - "Gay Athletes & Rappers: It's Not In to Be Out" - The Tyra Banks Show
  - "Growing Up Intersex" - The Oprah Winfrey Show
  - "Transgender Kids" - The Tyra Banks Show
- TV Journalism - Newsmagazine
  - Born in the Wrong Body (MSNBC)
  - "A Church Divided" - In the Life (PBS)
  - **"Don't Ask Don't Tell" - 60 Minutes** (CBS)
  - **"My Secret Self: A Story of Transgender Children" - 20/20** (ABC)
  - "A Royal Scandal" - Primetime: Family Secrets (ABC)
- TV Journalism - News Segment
  - **"The First Casualty" - Anderson Cooper 360** (CNN)
  - "Gay Homeless Teens" - Uncovering America (CNN)
  - "Gospel of Inclusion" - Uncovering America (CNN)
  - "Sent Away to 'Change'" - Good Morning America (ABC)
  - "Sex Change Controversy" - Paula Zahn Now (CNN)
- Newspaper Article
  - **"Aging and Gay, and Facing Prejudice in Twilight" by Jane Gross** (The New York Times)
  - "Girl/Boy Interrupted" by Lauren Smiley (SF Weekly)
  - "In a Progressive State, a City Where Gay Life Hangs by a Thread" by Andrew Jacobs (The New York Times)
  - "Line in Sand for Same-Sex Couples" by Teresa Watanabe (Los Angeles Times)
  - "What the Heart Wants" by Lane DeGregory (St. Petersburg Times)
- Newspaper Columnist
  - **Christine Daniels** (Los Angeles Times)
  - Alfred Doblin (The Record)
  - Mark Morford (San Francisco Chronicle)
  - Frank Rich (The New York Times)
  - Rebecca Walsh (The Salt Lake Tribune)
- Newspaper Overall Coverage
  - The Boston Globe
  - Los Angeles Times
  - **The New York Times**
  - The Seattle Times
  - San Francisco Chronicle
- Magazine Article
  - "Akinola's Power Play" by Kerry Eleveld (The Advocate)
  - **"Dying to Come Out: The War on Gays in Iraq" by David France** (GQ)
  - "The Kingdom in the Closet" by Nadya Labi (The Atlantic Monthly)
  - "(Rethinking) Gender" by Debra Rosenberg (Newsweek)
  - "Special Report: Gays at War" by Marc Haeringer, William Henderson, Michael Rowe, Corey Scholibo, and Bernice Yeung (The Advocate)
- Magazine Overall Coverage
  - **The Advocate**
  - CosmoGIRL!
  - Entertainment Weekly
  - Newsweek
  - Us Weekly
- Digital Journalism Article
  - **"Gay Newsmen - A Clearer Picture" by James Hillis** (AfterElton.com)
  - "Gender and the Pulpit" by Lauren McCauley (Newsweek.com)
  - "Officially 'I Do'" by Tracy Stokes (BET.com)
  - "Oregon State Coach Fulfills Dream of Becoming Father" by Graham Hays (ESPN.com)
  - "Why the T in LGBT is Here to Stay" by Susan Stryker (Salon.com)
- Digital Journalism – Multimedia
  - "The Advocate 40th Anniversary'" (Advocate.com)
  - "Fuera del Closet: Gay Hispanic Immigrants in Dallas" by Sergio Chapa (NewAmericaMedia.org)
  - "Landmark Moments in Gay Hollywood" by Mark S. Luckle (EW.com)
  - **"Uncovering America: Fighting for Acceptance"** (CNN.com)
- Music Artist
  - Bloc Party, A Weekend in the City
  - The Cliks, Snakehouse
  - Melissa Etheridge, The Awakening
  - **Rufus Wainwright, Release the Stars**
  - Patrick Wolf, The Magic Position
- Comic Book
  - American Virgin by Steven T. Seagle (Vertigo/DC Comics)
  - The Boys by Garth Ennis (Dynamite Entertainment)
  - Midnighter by Garth Ennis, Brian K. Vaughan, Christos Gage, Justin Gray & Jimmy Palmiotti, and Keith Giffin (Wildstorm/DC Comics)
  - The Outsiders by Judd Winick, Greg Rucka, and Tony Bedard (DC Comics)
  - **Strangers in Paradise by Terry Moore** (Abstract Studio)
- Advertising – Electronic
  - **"Change" - Levis**
  - "Goodbye" - Orbitz
  - "Jewels" & "Time" - Dolce & Gabbana
  - "Rejected" - Chemistry.com
  - "Tu Pride - Jaime" - MTV Tr3́s
- Los Angeles Theater
  - Act A Lady, by Jordan Harrison
  - Anything, by Tim McNeil
  - **Avenue Q, book by Jeff Whitty, music and lyrics by Robert Lopez and Jeff Marx**
  - Havana Bourgeois, by Carlos Lacamara
  - The Long Christmas Ride Home, by Paula Vogel
- New York Theater – Broadway & Off–Broadway
  - 100 Saints You Should Know by Kate Fodor
  - All That I Will Ever Be by Alan Ball
  - **The Beebo Brinker Chronicles by Kate Moira Ryan and Linda S. Chapman**
  - Some Men by Terrence McNally
  - Speech & Debate by Stephen Karam
- New York Theater – Off–Off Broadway
  - 1001 Beds by Tim Miller
  - **BASH'd: A Gay Rap Opera by Chris Craddock and Nathan Cuckow, music by Aaron Macri**
  - I Google Myself by Jason Schafer
  - Yank! book and lyrics by David Zellnik, music by Joseph Zellnik
  - The Young Ladies Of by Taylor Mac

== Special Recognition ==
- BET J
- Ivy Queen
- Theatre Rhinoceros
- The Intelligence Report
- Excellence in Media Award: Judy Shepard
- Vito Russo Award: Brian Graden
- Visibilidad Award: Wilson Cruz
- Vanguard Award: Janet Jackson
- Stephen F. Kolzak Award: Rufus Wainwright
- Pioneer Award: Herb Ritts
- Vanguard Award: Sharon Stone
- Davidson/Valentini Award: Ilene Chaiken
- Golden Gate Award: James Schamus
- Pioneer Award: David Mixner
