= Laquidara =

Laquidara is a surname. Notable people with the surname include:

- Charles Laquidara (born 1938), American radio personality
- Patrizia Laquidara (born 1972), Italian singer
