= Karen Blake =

American radio personality

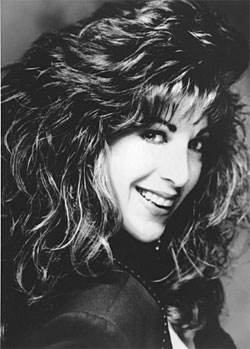
- Blake in 2008
- Born: Boston, Massachusetts
- Education: Endicott College
- Occupation: Disc jockey

Karen Blake is a radio disc jockey from Boston, Massachusetts. She has been on the Boston airwaves since the early 1980s.

== Early life and education ==
Blake graduated from Endicott College in Beverly, Massachusetts, majoring in Communications.

== Career ==
Karen began her career at Pyramid Broadcasting with six years at Kiss 108 WXKS-FM, Boston. She then joined Ardman Broadcasting's WZOU 94.5 (now WJMN) where she was also known as "The Madam" doing Contemporary Hit Radio. She could be heard Mornings on the "Morning Zoo" Evenings and on Afternoon Drive for nearly a decade.

Blake was also heard on Country Format WKLB-FM owned by Fairbanks Communication's for three years hosting Afternoon Drive.

She then spent 9 years at Entercom, Boston – CHR/Rhythmic station Star 93.7 WQSX (now WEEI-FM) co-hosting Morning Drive.

In October 2005, Blake joined CBS Radio's Variety Hits station 103.3 WODS (Oldies 103) in Boston, hosting the Afternoon Drive position from 2:00 p.m. to 6:00 p.m.

In September 2008, she moved to the Morning Drive slot on WODS and was heard on-the-air weekdays from 6:00 a.m. to 9:00 a.m.

In August 2012, Karen began working on-air at CBS station Mix 104.1 WBMX Boston.

Beginning in February 2014, Blake began hosting mornings at WQRC “999TheQ” on Cape Cod.

On April 15, 2019, Karen began hosting afternoons at WMJX (Magic 106.7) in Boston from 2:00 p.m. to 7:00 p.m.

== Honors and awards ==
Blake was voted Boston's most popular DJ by the Boston Herald Readers' Poll. She was also voted Boston's most popular DJ by the Rhode Island Journal. She has received accolades in many national magazines. Blake also received a nomination as "Major Market Air Personality of the Year."
