= Darrell Martinie =

American broadcaster

- Born: Darrell Blair-Edward Martinie; April 10, 1943; Massachusetts
- Died: July 26, 2006 (aged 63); Saugus, Massachusetts
- Resting place: Riverside Cemetery; Saugus, Massachusetts
- Education: University of Illinois
- Occupations: Radio personality, astrologer
- Years active: 1973–2006
- Spouse: Edward Boesel (2004–2006)

Darrell Blair-Edward Martinie a.k.a. The Cosmic Muffin (April 10, 1943 – July 26, 2006) was a Boston-based professional astrologer and radio personality.

== Early life ==
Martinie was born on April 10, 1943, in Massachusetts and grew up in Illinois.

In 1965, Martinie graduated from the University of Illinois with a degree in political science. In 1966 he began his first job as district manager of Illinois Bell Telephone Company in Decatur, Illinois. In 1971 he graduated from University of Illinois with a degree in psychology. While earning this degree, Martinie was first introduced to astrology when he attended a meeting of the school's astrology club. Although he initially believed astrology to be "stupid" and asinine", he later became hooked. That same year he moved to Boston, as he believed it was the most astrologically perfect place for him. After arriving in the city he began performing horoscope readings to employees of the state welfare department in exchange for them keeping him on the welfare rolls.

In 1972 he entered a Benedictine monastery with the intention of becoming a monk, but left after only nine months. He remained a practicing Catholic throughout his life.

== Radio career ==
In 1973, Martinie telephoned into Charles Laquidara's show on WBCN to correct his mistaken astrological reading. Laquidara would then give Martinie his start in radio as well as his nickname "The Cosmic Muffin", which was taken from a National Lampoon Radio Dinner parody "Deteriorata". His reports were syndicated to stations nationwide. Martinie would end each broadcast with the phrase "It is a wise man who rules the stars, a fool who is ruled by them - Over and out."

In 1993 Martinie was named "Official Astrologer of the Commonwealth of Massachusetts" by Governor of Massachusetts Bill Weld.

In the late 1990s, Martinie began easing into retirement.

== Illness and death ==
On April 10, 2003, Martinie was diagnosed with cancer. He died on July 26, 2006, at his home in Saugus, Massachusetts.

His longtime tagline "over and out" were the last words to be heard on WBCN on August 12, 2009, when the station went off the air.

== Personal life ==
His father was a Catholic and a psychiatrist and his mother was Jewish and a psychologist. He was the oldest of five children.

In 1969 his first marriage ended in divorce. The union produced one son.

Martinie was in a relationship with Edward Boesel from January 7, 1973, until Martinie's death. When same-sex marriage became legal in Massachusetts, Martinie and Boesel married. They were the first same-sex couple to obtain a marriage license in Saugus.
