= Maher Sabry =

Egyptian director

- Born: 11 April 1967 (age 59)
- Occupations: theater director, playwright, film director, producer, screenwriter, poet, writer and cartoonist.
- Notable work: All My Life

Maher Sabry (Arabic: ماهر صبري; born 11 April 1967) is an Egyptian theater director, playwright, film director, producer and screenwriter, poet, writer and cartoonist.

== Biography ==
A gay activist, he was the first director to portray gay and lesbian love in lyrical and sympathetic manner on Egyptian stage. He also directed the first all-gay award-winning Egyptian film All My Life (in Arabic طول عمري, transliteration Toul Oumry). He also published poetry in various Arabic language publications and Marionette is his first poetry collection, published by Garad Books in Cairo in 1998.

In 2005, he was also a founding member of the Egyptian Underground Film Society (EUFS) (in Arabic الجمعية المصرية للأفلام المهمّشة) as an outlet for promoting Egyptian independent film making and supporting freedom of expression away from legal restrictions, censorship and traditional imposed values.

== Gay activism ==
As a gay activist Maher Sabry pioneered with others gay forums for Egyptian LGBT on the internet, using the pseudonym "Horus".

On May 10, 2001 when 52 gay men were arrested at the Queen Boat Discothèque incident known as Cairo 52, Sabry launched a campaign focusing on anti-gay abuses in the case and asked for support from the international human rights group and gay organizations. He also mobilized legal aid and human rights organizations to provide representation in court for the victims.

In 2003, he appeared in a documentary by John Scagliotti entitled Dangerous Living: Coming Out in the Developing World. The documentary focusses on the Cairo 52 case and features Maher Sabry interview, in addition to various insights from activists from Brazil, Honduras, Namibia, Uganda, Malaysia, Pakistan, India, Vietnam, Fiji and the Philippines.

== Filmography ==
- 2008: All My Life

== Awards ==
- In 2002, he received the Felipa de Souza Award from the International Gay and Lesbian Human Rights Commission (IGLHRC).

== Sources ==
- Omar Hassan on PinkNews site: Interview: Arabic filmmaker Maher Sabry
- David Khalili in National Equality Resource Center: Exposing Oppression in Egypt
