= Reid Williams =

American film director

Reid Williams is a producer and director of films and television shows.

In 2003, Williams produced the documentary Dangerous Living: Coming Out in the Developing World, a film about gay and lesbian people in non-Western countries that was narrated by Janeane Garofalo.

In 2006, with Janet Baus and Dan Hunt he co-produced and co-directed the documentary Cruel and Unusual: Transgender Women in Prison.

The 2 documentaries aired on the television networks here! and WE TV respectively.

Reid was also the executive producer of Were the World Mine (2008).

He is currently developing projects for television. He also devotes time to international LGBT causes.
