= Nowhere Now =

Nowhere Now may refer to:

- Nowhere Now: Rock Covers Band Based in Aylesbury - www.nowherenowrock.com
- Nowhere Now: The Ballad of Joshua Tree, directed Don DiNicola
- "Nowhere Now", from The Devil You Know (Econoline Crush album)
- "Nowhere Now", from To the Bone (Steven Wilson album)
