= Before Stonewall =

1984 documentary film by Greta Schiller and Robert Rosenberg

- DVD cover
- Directed by: Greta Schiller; Robert Rosenberg
- Produced by: John Scagliotti; Robert Rosenberg; Greta Schiller
- Narrated by: Rita Mae Brown
- Cinematography: Jan Kraepelin; Sandi Sissel; Cathy Zheutlin
- Edited by: Bill Daughton
- Distributed by: First Run Features
- Release dates: September 15, 1984 (Toronto International Film Festival); June 27, 1985 (United States)
- Running time: 87 minutes
- Country: United States
- Language: English

Before Stonewall: The Making of a Gay and Lesbian Community is a 1984 American documentary film about the LGBT community prior to the 1969 Stonewall riots. It was narrated by author Rita Mae Brown, directed by Greta Schiller, co-directed by Robert Rosenberg, and co-produced by John Scagliotti and Rosenberg, and Schiller. It premiered at the 1984 Toronto International Film Festival and was released in the United States on June 27, 1985. In 1999, producer Scagliotti directed a companion piece, After Stonewall. To celebrate the 30th anniversary of the Teddy Awards, the film was shown at the 66th Berlin International Film Festival in February 2016. To commemorate the 50th anniversary of the Stonewall riots in 2019, the film was restored and re-released by First Run Features in June 2019. Later in 2019, the film was selected by the Library of Congress for preservation in the United States National Film Registry for being "culturally, historically, or aesthetically significant".

== People featured ==
- Ann Bannon
- Lisa Ben
- Gladys Bentley
- Ivy Bottini
- George Buse
- Carroll Davis
- Martin Duberman
- Allen Ginsberg
- Barbara Gittings
- Barbara Grier
- Mabel Hampton
- Harry Hay
- Dorothy "Smilie" Hillaire
- Evelyn Hooker
- Red Jordan Arobateau
- Frank Kameny
- Jim Kepner
- Audre Lorde
- Bruce Nugent
- Nell "Johnnie" Phelps
- Craig Rodwell
- José Sarria

== Awards ==
Before Stonewall was nominated for the Grand Jury Prize at the 1985 Sundance Film Festival. It won the Best Film Award at the Houston International Film Festival, Best Documentary Feature at Filmex, First Place at the National Educational Film Festival, and Honorable Mention at the Global Village Documentary Festival. In 1987, the film won Emmy Awards for Best Historical/Cultural Program and Best Research. In 1989, it won the Festival's Plate at the Torino International Gay & Lesbian Film Festival.

== See also ==
- After Stonewall, the 1999 sequel film about the 30 years of gay rights activism since 1969
- The Times of Harvey Milk, the 1984 Oscar-winning documentary about the late San Francisco politician Harvey Milk
- Stonewall, 2015 film by Roland Emmerich
- 1984 in film
