= Johnnie Phelps =

Decorated WWII Veteran

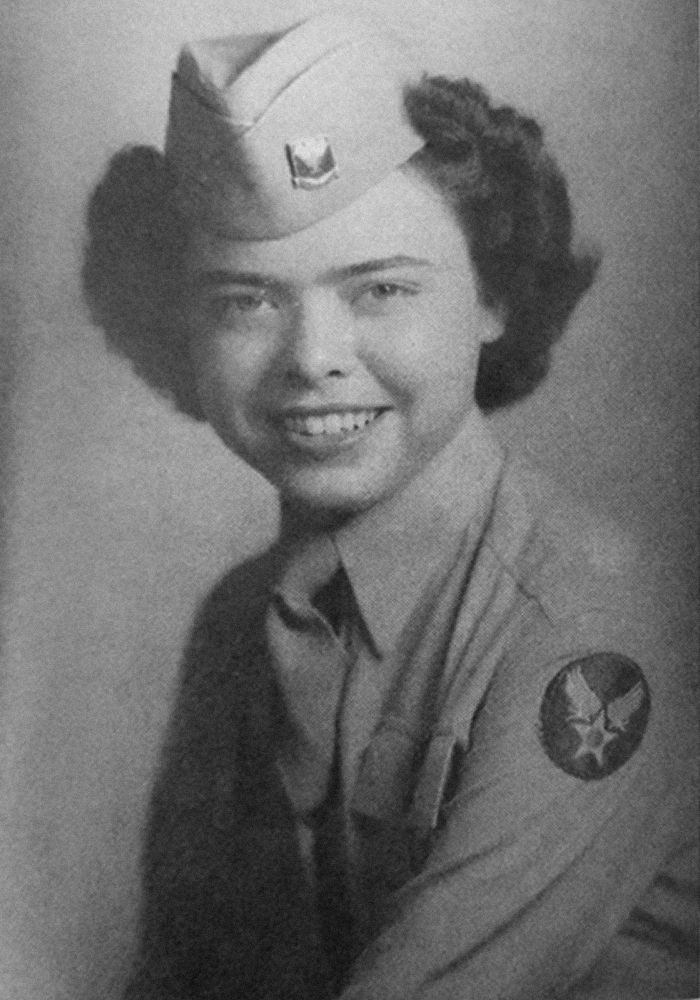
Johnnie Phelps

Nell "Johnnie" Phelps (April 4, 1922 – December 30, 1997) was a member of the Women's Army Corps who claimed that she managed to convince General Dwight D. Eisenhower not to eject lesbian members of the WAC as he had been ordered by President Truman. Though there are accusations this interaction never occurred

== Early life ==
Johnnie Phelps was born in North Carolina as Nell Louise Phelps on April 4, 1922, and was raised with an adoptive family.

== Military career ==
Johnnie Phelps joined the Women's Army Corps in 1943 during World War II. She was honorably discharged in 1945 and reenlisted in 1946.

Phelps claimed that in her post-World War II service she was assigned to head the motor pool for General Eisenhower in Germany. She claimed in an interview with Bunny MacCulloch in 1982, that in 1947 she was told by General Eisenhower, "It's come to my attention that there are lesbians in the WACs, we need to ferret them out...." Phelps replied, "If the General pleases, sir, I'll be happy to do that, but the first name on the list will be mine." Eisenhower's secretary added, "If the General pleases, sir, my name will be first and hers will be second." Phelps then told Eisenhower, "Sir, you're right, there are lesbians in the WACs – and if you want to replace all the file clerks, section commanders, drivers, every woman in the WAC detachment, I will be happy to make that list. But you must know, sir, that they are the most decorated group – there have been no illegal pregnancies, no AWOLs, no charges of misconduct." Eisenhower dropped the idea. Later Phelps said, "There were almost nine hundred women in the battalion. I could honestly say that 95 percent of them were lesbians". She was honorably discharged a second time.

== Later career ==
Phelps left the army to establish her own printing business, which she ran for years.

Phelps joined the National Organization for Women and founded the San Gabriel Valley - Whittier chapter in 1979. She chaired the California Lesbian Task Force (a branch of California NOW), and spearheaded protests on behalf of the Norton Sound Eight - eight female crew members aboard the USS Norton Sound who were charged with "homosexual misconduct." In addition, she joined the Southern California Women for Understanding organization and served on the Los Angeles County Veterans' Advisory Commission. A recovering alcoholic, she also served as president of the Alcoholism Center for Women.

She was appointed by Gloria Molina to the Los Angeles Commission on Veterans' Affairs and resigned in 1996 due to severe health problems.

She appeared in the Before Stonewall documentary, and she was interviewed for books, including, My Country, My Right to Serve by Mary Ann Humphrey, and Conduct Unbecoming by Randy Shilts.

She appeared in the Trailblazers: Unsung Military Heroines of WWII documentary by Mindy Pomper, shown ad infinitum at the Women's Memorial in Washington D.C.

== Personal life ==
Phelps married a Navy man, but the marriage was unhappy, and to escape it, she joined the military in 1943.

Johnnie Phelps' first female lover died when their boat was bombed as they landed on Leyte, Philippines in 1944.

Living in Southern California, Phelps became politically active in the 1970s. It was around this time that she met Grace Bukowski, her last partner, who survived her. Phelps died on December 30, 1997, at the Veterans Home in Barstow, and her ashes were buried with full honor in the U.S. Veterans Cemetery in Westwood, Los Angeles.

== Legacy ==
In 1993, Veterans for Human Rights organized the annual Sgt. Johnnie Phelps Annual Awards Banquet in Portland, Oregon.
