= About Her =

- Directed by: Phyllis Ellis
- Narrated by: Kim Cattrall
- Country of origin: Canada
- Original language: English

Production
- Running time: 50 minutes

Original release
- Network: W Network
- Release: 2011

About Her is a Canadian documentary film, directed by Phyllis Ellis and aired in 2011. Narrated by Kim Cattrall, the film profiles a number of women battling the HER2 strain of breast cancer.

A shorter version of the film premiered at Toronto's Breast Fest Film Festival in 2009, before being expanded into a full-length film. The longer film was again screened at Breast Fest, along with a television broadcast on W Network.

The film won the Donald Brittain Award for Best Social/Political Documentary Program at the 1st Canadian Screen Awards in 2012.
