= WBMX =

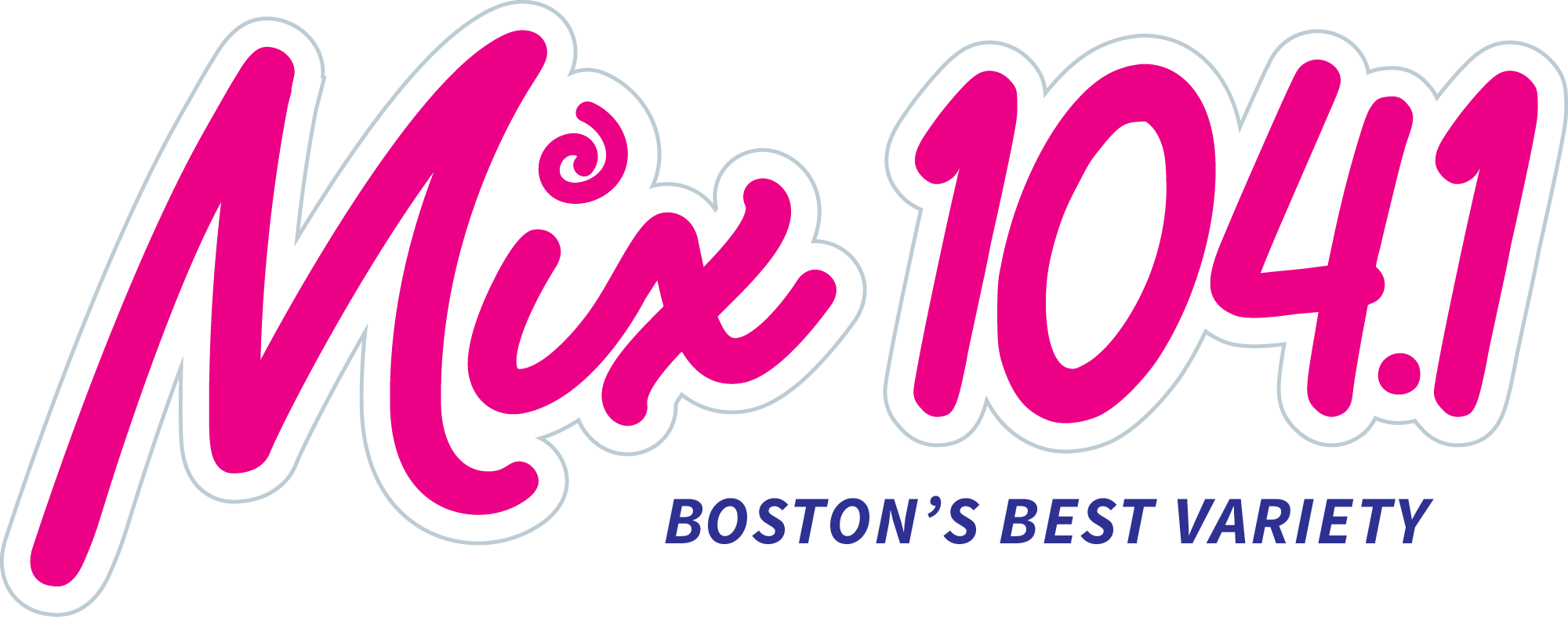
- Boston, Massachusetts; United States
- Broadcast area: Greater Boston
- Frequency: 104.1 MHz (HD Radio)
- Branding: Mix 104.1

Programming
- Language: English
- Format: Hot adult contemporary
- Subchannels: HD2: "WAAF" (active rock)

Ownership
- Owner: Audacy, Inc.; (Audacy License, LLC)
- Sister stations: WBGB; WEEI; WEEI-FM; WMJX; WVEI

History
- First air date: May 1958
- Former call signs: WBCN (1958–2009); WBMX (2009–2017); WWBX (2017–2026)
- Call sign meaning: "Boston's Mix"

Technical information
- Licensing authority: FCC
- Facility ID: 26897
- Class: B
- ERP: 21,000 watts
- HAAT: 235 meters (771 ft)
- Transmitter coordinates: 42°20′50.3″N 71°4′57.1″W

Links
- Public license information: Public file; LMS
- Webcast: Listen live (via Audacy); Listen live (via iHeartRadio); HD2: Listen live (via Audacy); HD2: Listen live (via iHeartRadio)
- Website: www.audacy.com/mix1041; HD2: www.audacy.com/waaf

WBMX (104.1 FM) is a radio station in Boston, Massachusetts, United States, serving Greater Boston with a hot adult contemporary format. The format started at 98.5 FM on February 9, 1991, and moved to 104.1 FM, replacing WBCN on August 12, 2009, to allow for the launch of WBZ-FM at 98.5 the next day. Its studios are located in Brighton, and its transmitter is on the upper FM mast of the Prudential Tower in Downtown Boston.

The 104.1 MHz facility went on the air in 1958 as WBCN. A classical music station for its first ten years, beginning in 1968 WBCN featured a rock format for 41 years. Known as "The Rock of Boston", WBCN became a legend in the rock music industry for breaking many bands, including U2. WBCN was a modern rock/active rock station that mixed music that has been popular in the modern rock, alternative rock and classic rock genres. WBCN switched to digital-only on August 12, 2009, with two digital-only automated streams: one on the HD2 channel of WBZ-FM continuing the modern rock format and the other known as Free Form BCN, airing an eclectic mix of rock, related genres, and new music - essentially the WBCN of 1968 to 1988, brought into the 21st century. Free Form BCN continued on the air until January 2016. The station's battle of the bands' competition, the Rock 'n' Roll Rumble, survived the station's demise. WBCN's local music specialty show, Boston Emissions—along with The Rumble—moved to then-sister station WZLX, now owned by iHeartMedia, in 2009. Boston DJ Anngelle Wood remains the host and music director of both the radio show and The Rumble—these are the last remaining ties to the original 104.1 WBCN programming.

WBCN was replaced on the 104.1 MHz facility by the Mix brand, hot adult contemporary format, and WBMX call sign that had debuted at 98.5 MHz in 1991. From 2017 to 2026, the station operated under the call sign WWBX, allowing its sister station in Chicago to use WBMX.

== History ==
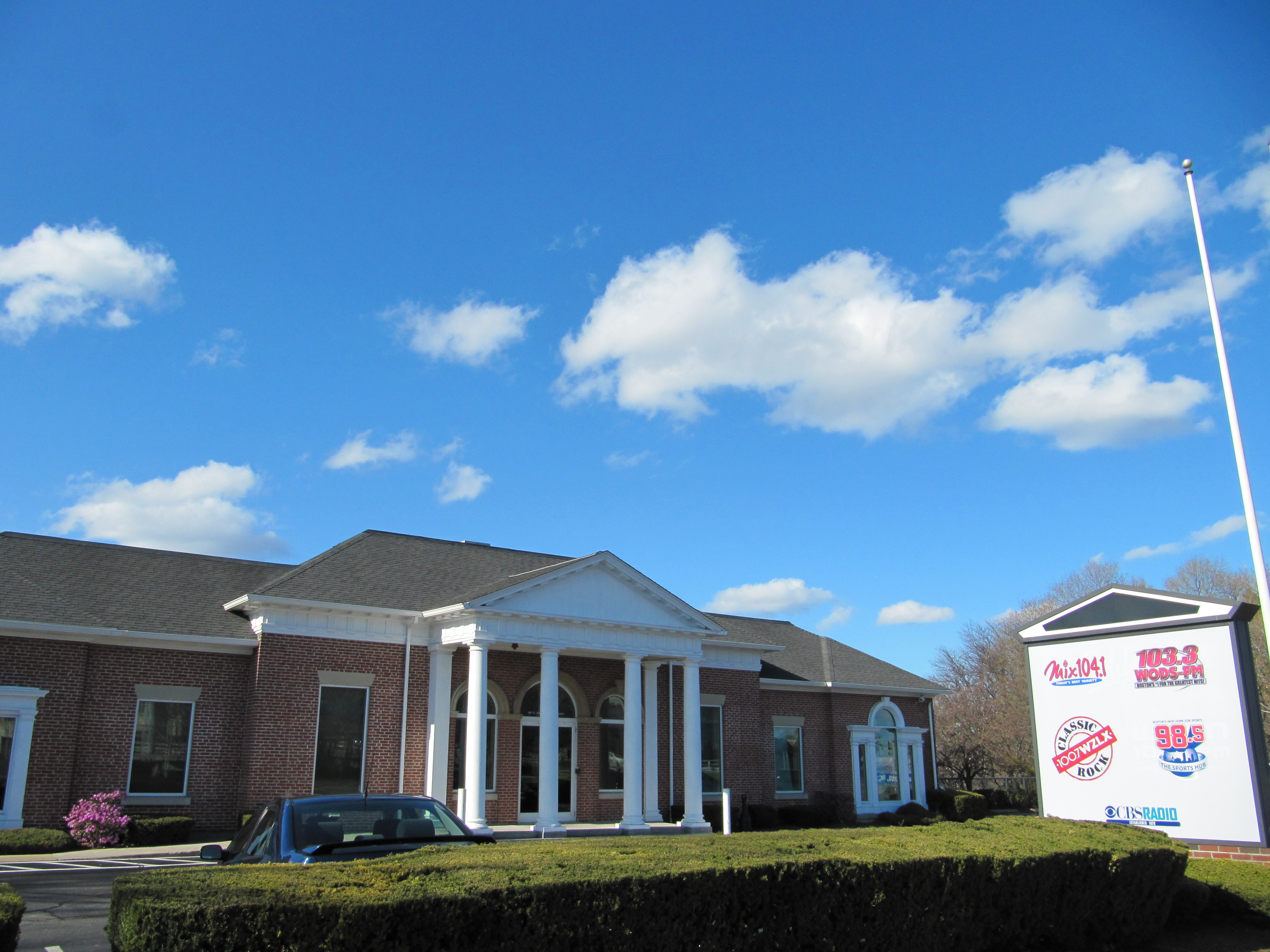
WBMX/WWBX has been based out of this studio building in Brighton, shared with CBS's other Boston FM stations (and built for former sister station WSBK-TV in an antebellum style favored by that stations' then-owner, Storer Broadcasting) since 2009. The building also housed WBCN's studios starting in 2005.

=== WBCN ===
In May 1958, 104.1 FM officially signed on as WBCN, airing classical music. The call sign stood for the Boston Concert Network (along with Hartford's WHCN, New York City's WNCN, and Providence's WXCN). One of the on-air personalities at that time was Ron Della Chiesa, who also served as the music host and program director. Della Chiesa is still active in classical music broadcasting on WCRB. In 1965, Nathaniel Johnson was appointed Music Director of WBCN by station program director Don Otto. Johnson remained with the station until 1967, just prior to the changeover from classical to easy-listening, and then to rock. Johnson then left WBCN to assume a new position at WGBH.

The station slowly began to change to an "underground" progressive rock format on the night of March 15, 1968. BCN's first rock announcer, "Mississippi Harold Wilson" (Joe Rogers), used the station's first slogan, "The American Revolution" and played the first song "I Feel Free" by the rock group Cream. At first, the new "American Revolution" format was only heard during the late-evening and overnight hours, but in mid-May, the station expanded the rock programming to 24 hours a day. By June 1968, the station's air staff included Mississippi, Peter Wolf (who was just starting with the J. Geils Band), Tommy Hadges, Jim Parry, Al Perry, and Sam Kopper was joined by Steven "The Seagull" Segal. Segal's arrival was critical to the station's early development since he came in from Los Angeles and San Francisco, where he had been mentored by the legendary West Coast DJ Tom Donahue, who was credited with starting the first underground rock FM station at KMPX the year before. Segal's West Coast radical radio consciousness infused the early 'BCN. In the summer of 1968, Kopper was made the station's first program director. That fall, Segal and Kopper hired J. J. Jackson as a disc jockey. Twelve years later, JJ would become one of MTV's first VJs. In December 1968, Peter Wolf left to take the J. Geils Band full-time and, introduced to the station by Jim Parry, Charles Laquidara was hired to take over the 10:00 p.m. to 2:00 a.m. air shift. Between late 1968 and early 1971, as program director, Kopper sought out and hired Norm Winer, recently graduated from Brandeis; Andy Beaubien, recently graduated from URI; and Maxanne Sartori, who came in from her DJ position at KOL-FM in Seattle.

WBCN began supporting non-mainstream investigative reporting and alternative news coverage, including reports from demonstrations and highly produced montage news reports. The news department was initially headed by Norm Winer, who later became program director. For a brief period during that transition, Charles Laquidara, who was acting program director hired Robert "Bo" Burlingham as news director. Bo resigned shortly thereafter when his name appeared on a UPI news wire as one of several people being indicted by then-Attorney General John Mitchell—a charge which was later dropped. Danny Schechter replaced Bo Burlingham and immediately billed himself as "the News Dissector". Along with Andrew Kopkind, John Scagliotti, Bill Lichtenstein, and Marsha Steinberg, the news department evolved radically, introducing such novel concepts as a show oriented toward prison inmates, health warnings about the hazards of street drugs, a lost pet-finding service called the Cat and Dog Report, a travelers' aid service called the Travelers' Friend, live updates on the traffic problems at Woodstock, and by 1970, live-to-air concert broadcasts. WBCN's programming in 1971-72 bore little relationship to the Billboard Hot 100 or any other conventional programming. Classical music, jazz, or anything else might be played, as long as the skillful DJs could make it work. For the first time, the owners of the station began to make a profit. However, there was always tension between the artistic expression of the DJs, and management's need to run a business, resulting in the unionization of the station with the United Electrical Workers in 1971.

Popular legend holds that WBCN was sent a promotional copy of The Beatles' unreleased Get Back album and played it on the air before the release of the album was cancelled. The "album" had been compiled out of material the Beatles recorded in London in January 1969, the same sessions that would be used to create the Beatles' Let It Be album which was released in May 1970. While the existence of the promotional album is apocryphal, the truth behind the broadcast, though less dramatic, is equally as fascinating. In late summer of 1969, WBCN somehow obtained a reel-to-reel tape of a reference acetate of a potential album song lineup prepared by Beatles' engineer Glyn Johns on March 10, 1969. WBCN aired the tape on September 22, 1969. Although WBCN was not the only radio station, or even the first station, to air material from the Get Back sessions — WKBW in Buffalo was the first, and the tapes also aired on WEBN in Cincinnati, WBAI in New York City, and KCOK in St. Louis — WBCN's broadcast of the tapes has been immortalized because it was preserved on a high-quality reel, which spawned several widely circulated Beatles bootlegs.

By 1975, WBCN had gradually evolved from the underground/progressive format of the 1960s to the more mainstream album oriented rock format popular in the 1970s. Unlike most rock stations of the era, WBCN still allowed a degree of individual DJ control of the music. Their playlist in general was more varied than many of their competitors, there was some focus on local music (also see the WBCN Rock & Roll Rumble), and the station was known nationwide for breaking acts (The Cars, 'Til Tuesday, U2) and setting trends. Oedipus (who had the first punk rock show in the country while at MIT's college station, WTBS) was hired first as a DJ in 1977, and then installed as program director in 1981, and helped to break The Ramones, The Clash, The Police, and countless punk and new wave bands out of Boston.

In the period around 1975, John Garabedian, now recognized for the nationally syndicated Open House Party (which was once heard locally on WXKS-FM), was an afternoon DJ on WBCN.

In 1979, the station was purchased by Hemisphere Broadcasting, who let go several longtime employees who they determined "non-essential". This set off a local controversy in Boston that resulted in the entire airstaff walking off the air striking in protest. During the walkout, WBCN stayed on the air with substitute DJs imported from several out-of-town Hemisphere sister stations. The protest got local media coverage and the attention of several well-known Boston-based music acts, including The Cars, Aerosmith, and Boston, who got behind the protest. When several large advertisers pulled spots, and the union filed a challenge to Hemisphere's license (pointing out that by forcing the staff out on strike, Hemisphere had created a situation where it could not provide the public service it was required to), Hemisphere relented, the fired staffers were rehired and the DJs went back on the air. (It was also rumored that Hemisphere's FCC lawyers had vetoed the course of action advised by Hemisphere's labor lawyers). Charles Laquidara played Superman by The Kinks back to back for an entire show in celebration.

By the mid-1980s, WBCN had successfully fended off a number of challengers (the hard rocking but tightly formatted WCOZ, Top 40 Hitradio WHTT, classic rock WZLX, among others) to become/remain the region's top rock station. Many of the DJs, particularly morning "Big Mattress" host Charles Laquidara, were now local quasi-celebrities. Laquidara had Billy West on the show on a daily basis, as well as Karlos, the first computer-generated (using Digital Equipment's DECtalk) on-air personality in radio history. Legendary Boston stripper Princess Cheyenne hosted a Sunday night sex advice show that eventually led to one of her appearances in Playboy Magazine in April 1986. The station was more commercial and "programmed" by this point, but still retained some of its progressive energy and edge.

By the 1990s, WBCN was at a crossroads. With its audience aging, it risked becoming a classic rock-focused station and losing its currency as an outlet for new music. For a long time, WBCN successfully balanced new and old music (featuring the slogan "Classic to Cutting Edge"). In the early 1990s, the station began airing the nationally syndicated Howard Stern Show, but aired it in the evenings on tape delay instead of during morning drive. This allowed them to retain their "Big Mattress" morning show along with its large and loyal audience.

==== Active rock era ====
In early 1994, WBCN made its first major format adjustment since 1968. The old DJs, station IDs, and classic rock were gutted; they were replaced by an alternative music format featuring new, younger jocks. On April 1, 1996, the Stern show was moved to mornings. The station lost some of its longtime listeners (who migrated to the now co-owned WZLX, where former WBCN DJs Laquidara and Carter Alan had gone), but quickly gained credibility among many younger people. Starting in 1997, WBCN started following and participating in the "Monday Night Wars" between WWF (WWE) and WCW. This was helmed by WBCN personalities ChaChi Loprete and Cali. The two helped bring WrestleMania to the TD Garden, the "DX Workout" to Boston's City Hall Plaza, and Stone Cold Steve Austin and Vince McMahon to CambridgeSide Galleria which saw McMahon being thrown into the Charles River. Following the success of those events, WBCN and Cali began combining rock music and sports entertainment.

In the summer of 1999, WBCN moved its format away from strictly alternative music and more towards an active rock-leaning modern rock format. By this time, the station was playing some hard rock and nu metal acts such as Godsmack, Korn, Limp Bizkit, and Linkin Park. By the fall of 2002, certain classic artists, such as Aerosmith, Led Zeppelin, and Ozzy Osbourne, were added back in the station's playlist rotation.

Much of the station's programming focused on syndicated talk shows (former WAAF personalities Opie & Anthony replacing David Lee Roth, who had previously replaced Howard Stern in morning drive time). During the autumn months, WBCN became more focused on sports as the station broadcast the games of the NFL's New England Patriots beginning in 1995.

In early 2006, with the Howard Stern morning drive time show gone due to Stern moving to Sirius Satellite Radio, WBCN experienced a plummet in Arbitron ratings that the station had not observed since the late 1970s and early 1980s, when it fell behind then rock format competitor WCOZ. The station started to air the syndicated Opie & Anthony during the morning drive. WBCN also launched The Toucher and Rich Show, a new locally produced comedy-based afternoon drive time show starring Fred Toettcher and Rich Shertenlieb. The duo formerly worked together at Atlanta alternative station WNNX.

In 2007, the station was nominated for the Top 25 Markets Alternative Station of the Year Award by Radio & Records magazine. Other nominees included KROQ-FM in Los Angeles, KTBZ-FM in Houston, KITS, in San Francisco, KNDD in Seattle, and WWDC in Washington, D.C.

In December 2008, the station ceased airing Opie & Anthony in morning drive and moved Toucher and Rich from afternoons. During the following months, industry insiders, local media, and even WBCN's on air staff speculated that, in a matter of time, WBCN could see a format change, especially after the Boston Herald ran an article in the March 30, 2009, issue about WBCN's future, and the station airing a Top 40 format for a few hours the following day (April Fool's Day).

From 1995 to 2008, WBCN was the flagship station of the Patriots Rock Radio Network, which broadcast games of the New England Patriots. Gil Santos, former WBZ sports reporter, did play-by-play, while Gino Cappelletti, former Patriots star, provided color commentary. With WBCN's dissolution as an analog station, the Patriots flagship station became WBCN's sister station WBZ-FM on August 13, 2009.

==== Digital only ====
On July 14, 2009, CBS Radio announced that WBCN would sign off the 104.1 MHz frequency the following month.

WBCN's last four days on analog radio were celebration and retrospective shows highlighting WBCN's history. Bradley Jay (later, he became host of the weekday overnight talk show, "Jay Talking", on AM sister station WBZ) was the last DJ. The final songs on WBCN were Cream's "I Feel Free", the first rock song played on WBCN in 1968, and Pink Floyd's "Shine On You Crazy Diamond", followed by a much-used collage of songs with the line "They're really Rockin' in Boston..." and station bits and ID spots used over the years, which then slowed to a halt before the final words were delivered, borrowing the tagline of the late Darrell Martinie, the Cosmic Muffin: "Over and out." At 12:05 a.m. on August 12, 2009, the station went into a static-like sound, and after a few moments, a voice read the new station identification: "WBMX, WBMX-HD1, Boston" over the "static". The static was broadcast on 104.1 until 2:00 a.m. At that time, "Mix 98.5" officially moved to 104.1, playing "Use Somebody" by Kings of Leon as their first song after the move. That song was in heavy rotation on WBCN during the months leading up to CBS Radio's announcement of the station's demise, and continued until the four-day farewell began.

HD Radio substations on the FM frequencies changed as well:

- WBCN's 104.1 analog and HD1 moved to 98.5 (WBZ-FM) HD-2.
- "WBCN's Free Form 104", moved from 104.1 HD2 to 100.7 (WZLX) HD3 and was renamed "Free Form BCN". It was programmed by Sam Kopper, WBCN's first rock program director, and also featured past events from the WBCN archives.
- "Indie 104.1" on 104.1 HD3 ceased operations.
- WBMX moved all of its subchannels with it from 98.5 to 104.1: "Mix" on analog and HD1, "The '80s Channel" on HD2, and "The Sky" on HD3.

This was done to make room for an all-sports talk format at the 98.5 FM frequency, known as "98.5 The Sports Hub" WBZ-FM. WBCN's Toucher and Rich morning show began broadcasting on WBZ-FM on August 14, 2009. WBCN's afternoon DJ Rob Poole, known on air as "Hardy", announced on his final WBCN show that he would co-host a sports-themed show on WBZ-FM on Saturday mornings.

To keep the intellectual property of WBCN intact, without another station in Boston making claim to it, CBS Radio parked the WBCN call letters on WFNA, a station located at 1660 AM in Charlotte, North Carolina. The Charlotte station was a semi-satellite of WFNZ 610 AM, known then as "The Franchise", an all sports talk station. The FCC approved the transfer in the spring of 2009. As part of the switch, the WBMX call letters were parked on 1660 AM in Charlotte from July 29, 2009, until WBCN signed off for the last time at 104.1 in Boston on August 12, 2009. On September 14, 2009, WBCN split from WFNZ and became "America's Talk", a conservative-leaning talk station. It returned to sports programming in 2013 as a full-time satellite of CBS Sports Radio.

==== WBCN Free Form Rock ====
"WBCN Free Form Rock" (originally "WBCN Free Form 104", then "Free Form BCN") was a digital-only radio station broadcasting on the Internet and in the Boston radio market on WZLX 100.7 HD3. The station, programmed by BCN's original 1969 program director, Sam Kopper, began airing in February 2009 as "WBCN Free Form 104", airing, until the demise of the original WBCN, on 104.1 HD2. Since WBCN's change to digital-only, the station was known as "Free Form BCN" and then "WBCN Free Form Rock" by late September 2009. WBCN Free Form Rock was formatted essentially the same as WBCN's 104.1 FM's 1968-88 incarnation (a great deal of rock, rock's related genres, and new music), different from the modern rock format that was carried on 98.5-HD2. "WBCN Free Form Rock" was formatted to play multiple music genres (including rock, jazz, the blues, and country). WBCN Free Form Rock was advertised to be a replica of the original WBCN format circa 1968 to the early 1990s, playing any song it wants, including rock and relative genres. In late 2009, the station begun to increase its DJ'd programming. While it was automated most of the time, it was increasing its live weekdays, and hinting about the potential for more programming as listenership increased. However, on January 29, 2016, "WBCN Free Form Rock" was dropped from WZLX-HD3 and flipped to adult standards as "The Lounge". On December 19, 2017, the HD3 channel was removed.

==== End of WBCN ====
On February 2, 2017, CBS announced that they would be selling their radio division to Entercom, whose existing properties in the Boston area included WBCN's long-time rival, WAAF. However, the combined company would have to shed some of its Boston stations to satisfy Federal Communications Commission and Department of Justice requirements. On October 10, 2017, CBS disclosed that as part of the process of obtaining regulatory approval of the merger, WBZ-FM would be one of sixteen stations that would be divested by Entercom, along with sister stations WBZ and WZLX, and Entercom stations WRKO and WKAF, with Entercom retaining WEEI AM and FM, WBMX, WODS and WAAF. On November 1, 2017, Beasley Media Group announced that it would trade WMJX to Entercom, in exchange for WBZ-FM (WBZ, WZLX, WRKO, and WKAF were acquired by iHeartMedia). The merger was approved on November 9, 2017, and was consummated on November 17. Beasley took complete ownership of the station on December 20, 2017. Shortly after the transfer to Beasley was completed, WBCN was replaced with "Hubcast", a replay of segments and podcasts from air personalities from "The Sports Hub".

=== Mix 104.1 ===
On July 14, 2009, CBS Radio announced that WBMX would move from 98.5 FM to 104.1 FM, replacing WBCN; these moves were made to launch a sports talk station, WBZ-FM, at the 98.5 frequency. As a result, the station added the "-FM" suffix on July 29, 2009, allowing CBS to temporarily place the WBMX call letters on the former WFNA (1660 AM) in Charlotte, North Carolina; additionally, during "Mix"'s final week on 98.5, it used the WBZ-FM call letters intended for the new station. WBCN's rock format moved to 98.5's HD2 subcarrier. WBCN's programming on 104.1 ended after midnight on August 12, 2009, WBMX then moved to 104.1 two hours later (the WBCN call letters were then transferred to the Charlotte station), with WBZ-FM launching the next day. The final song "Mix" played on 98.5 was "Move Along" by The All-American Rejects, while the first song "Mix" played on 104.1 was "Use Somebody" by Kings of Leon.

On February 2, 2017, CBS Radio announced it would merge with Entercom (which locally owned WEEI, WEEI-FM, WRKO, WKAF, and WAAF). WBMX, WODS, and WAAF were retained by Entercom, while sister stations WBZ and WZLX, as well as WKAF and WRKO, were spun off to iHeartMedia (WBZ-FM would be traded to Beasley Broadcast Group in exchange for WMJX, making WBMX and WMJX sister stations.) The merger was approved on November 9, 2017, and was consummated on November 17. Entercom applied to move the WBMX callsign to a sister station in Chicago; 104.1 picked up the new callsign WWBX on December 4, 2017. The WBMX call sign returned to the Boston station on February 2, 2026, concurrent with the Chicago station becoming a simulcast of WSCR.

On Sundays, from 5 a.m. until noon, the station airs "Acoustic Sunrise", featuring acoustic versions of songs from the station's playlist. WBMX is the flagship station of the show, which is aired on several Audacy stations nationwide.

On-Air Talent

- Morning Show: Karson & Kennedy with Producer Dan
- Midday: Kira Lew
- Afternoon Drive: Gregg, Freddy, and Andrea

== Alumni ==
- Peter Wolf, front man for J. Geils Band and solo recording artist
- Billy West, voice actor (The Ren & Stimpy Show and many others)
- Maxanne Sartori, afternoon DJ (1970-1977)
- Danny Schechter, 1970s "Danny Schechter, the news dissector"
- Oedipus, DJ (1977–2004); Program Director (1981–2004)
- Bill Lichtenstein, newscaster and weekend announcer; Peabody Award-winning producer (1970–1978)
- Charles Laquidara, DJ (nighttime, 1969–1972; mornings, 1972–1976, 1978–1996)
- "Captain Ken" Shelton, Weekday mid-day DJ (1980-1993), Host of The Mighty Lunch Hour
- Mark Parenteau, Weekday afternoon DJ
- Carter Alan, Music Director (1986-1998), DJ (1979-1986); Author of Radio Free Boston: The Rise and Fall of WBCN (University Press of New England, 2013) and four other books including two about U2 whom Carter and WBCN helped break into the American market.
- Karen Blake, Mix 104.1 DJ
- J. J. Jackson, hired by Segal and Kopper in Fall 1968
- Tami Heide, DJ (1984-1991); Her next gig was KROQ in LA

== Awards ==
Mix 104.1 (and the previous Mix 98.5) is one of the most honored radio stations in the country, and has earned more major radio awards than any other hot AC station in history. The station was named "Hot AC Station of The Year" nine times from 1997 through 2009. Former program director Greg Strassell was named "Hot AC Program Director of The Year" nine times. Long time music director Mike Mullaney earned "Hot AC Music Director Of The Year" five times. In 2010, morning team Karson & Kennedy were named "Hot AC Morning Show of The Year" of 2009 by FMQB magazine.

== HD radio subchannels ==
Subchannel	Branding	Format	Notes
1	Mix 104.1	Hot adult contemporary	Simulcasts the main analog signal.
2	WAAF	Mainstream rock	

=== WBMX-HD1 ===
WBMX-HD1 simulcasts the analog signal of WBMX as Mix 104.1.

=== WBMX-HD2 ===
Active rock accounts for all regular programming on the HD2 digital subchannel. Branded as "WAAF", WBMX-HD2 also simulcasts over the HD2 digital subchannel of WEEI-FM and is available online via Audacy; both subchannels previously simulcast the analog signal of WAAF (107.3 FM) until that station was divested to the Educational Media Foundation on February 22, 2020.

=== WBMX-HD3 ===
WBMX-HD3 formerly aired "Tomorrow's Hits Today", a contemporary hit radio format that focused on the very latest hits prior to their ascension to the top of the charts. The HD3 subchannel has since been turned off.

== Other sources ==
- Boston Emissions, WBCN's local independent music show
- WBCN and The American Revolution documentary film webpage
