= Breast Fest Film Festival =

Breast Fest Film Festival is an annual film festival hosted by Rethink Breast Cancer in Toronto, Canada and dedicated to breast cancer awareness. The multi-platform festival showcases films that cover the emotional spectrum of the disease.

In 2011, films screened included About Her, Baring It All, Crazy Sexy Cancer, One of the 1 Per Cent - The Sandy Ahenakew Story and Stricken (Komt een vrouw bij de dokter), as well as Season 1, Episode 3 of The Big C.
