= The Pru =

The Pru is a colloquial term that may refer to:

- Prudential plc, a British financial services company
- The Prudential Tower, a skyscraper in Boston MA
