= Dangerous Living: Coming Out in the Developing World =

- DVD cover
- Directed by: John Scagliotti
- Produced by: Janet Baus; Dan Hunt
- Narrated by: Janeane Garofalo
- Edited by: Anat Salomon
- Music by: Don DiNicola
- Production company: After Stonewall Productions
- Distributed by: First Run Features (DVD)
- Release dates: 2003 (U.S.); May 11, 2005 (TV)
- Running time: 62 minutes
- Country: United States
- Language: English

Dangerous Living: Coming Out in the Developing World is a 2003 documentary film directed by American filmmaker John Scagliotti about the issues experienced by gay, lesbian and transgender people in developing countries. It was the first documentary film to explore these issues in non-Western countries. It is narrated by actress and comedian Janeane Garofalo. It was produced by Janet Baus and Dan Hunt, both of whom had worked with Scagliotti on his previous film, After Stonewall. The film focuses in particular on Cairo 52, a group of 52 Egyptian men who were arrested on board a floating gay nightclub in 2001. It features interviews with gay-rights activists from countries around the world including Honduras, Namibia, Pakistan, the Philippines and Vietnam.

== Overview ==
The film opens with the Cairo 52. In 2001, 52 Egyptian men were arrested on board the Queen Boat on the Nile, which was a gay disco. With no specific law against homosexuality in Egypt, the men were arrested for debauchery. They were tried and sentenced to between one and five years imprisonment. Scagliotti interviews one of the men, Ashraf Zanati.

== Distribution ==
Dangerous Living was screened at several international film festivals and was an official selection at the International Film Festival on Human Rights in Geneva. It won Audience Awards at the Barcelona GLBT International Festival and the Hartford Alternatives Festival. It was also shown at the 2003 San Francisco International Lesbian & Gay Film Festival (Frameline) and the 2005 Boston Gay & Lesbian Film Festival. The film had its US broadcast premiere on May 11, 2005, on the here! network, with an introduction by former US ambassador James Hormel. This coincided with the fourth anniversary of Cairo 52. It was released on DVD by First Run Features on May 24, 2005, as part of their "Human Rights Watch Collection". Dennis Harvey reviewed the film for Variety; he called it "workmanlike and at times [...] cluttered" but "fascinating and educational."
