= Baring It All =

- DVD cover
- Directed by: Patricia Zagarella
- Produced by: Patricia Zagarella
- Starring: David Jay; Marcy Emmons; Michaela Klose; Sylvia Soo; Vanessa Tiemeier
- Cinematography: Ben Wolf; Mia Barker
- Edited by: Oliver Lief
- Music by: Don DiNicola
- Production company: Lost In Vision Entertainment
- Release date: July 9, 2011
- Running time: 47 minutes
- Country: United States
- Language: English

Baring It All is a documentary film about fashion photographer David Jay and The SCAR Project, a series of photographic portraits of young women in various stages of breast cancer and other hormonal cancers. Directed by filmmaker Patricia Zagarella of Lost In Vision Entertainment, the film was picked up by the Style Network as part of their "Style Exposed" documentary series and first aired on Style on July 9, 2011.

The film focuses the Jay and his motivations for embarking on the project, a departure from fashion photography work, as well as on four different women who chose to participate in The SCAR Project, posing for nude portraits revealing their scars from mastectomies, breast reconstruction and other surgeries related to their treatment.

== Themes ==
Baring It All deals with themes of body image post-cancer, striving to be "a story of acceptance, a journey of rediscovery and a celebration of life." Jay began The SCAR Project with a portrait of a friend who had undergone a mastectomy and was surprised to learn that the subject also found the photo shoot beneficial. Many of the women photographed reported similar responses, finding pride and strength through the process of portraiture.

The film also explores the reality of cancer and its aftermath of physical and emotional scars. The SCAR Project's name itself is an acronym for "Surviving Cancer. Absolute Reality," and many of its promotional materials include the tagline "Breast cancer is not a pink ribbon." According to the Style Network's synopsis of the film, "Along with exploring the lives of these young females and their new reality, Baring It All shows the impact cancer has had on them and their loved ones and answers what drives them to be photographed at their most vulnerable."

== Production ==
Zagarella learned of The SCAR Project through a mutual friend and, with co-producer Nicola Bates, soon began work on the project. During much of the filming and production the film's working title was Don't Look Away. Later, when the film was being finalized through Style, the network producers suggested changing it to what they felt was more representative of the subject matter.

During filming of the women's photo shoots, only female crew members were used in order to keep the portrait subjects more comfortable. Cinematographers were Mia Barker and Ben Wolf. In post-production, Baring It All was edited by Oliver Lief with sound by Peter Ring and music by Don DiNicola, incorporating several songs from recording artist Christina Blust.

== Release ==
Baring It All first aired on Style July 9, 2011. The home release became available on DVD July 25, 2011, and includes extra footage of other portrait subjects and their families.

The film has been screened at several film festivals, including the Big Sky Documentary Film Festival and Toronto's Breast Fest Film Festival. In 2012 Baring It All received a Daytime Emmy Award.
