= WMJX =

Adult contemporary radio station in Boston

- Boston, Massachusetts; United States
- Broadcast area: Greater Boston
- Frequency: 106.7 MHz (HD Radio)
- Branding: Magic 106.7

Programming
- Language: English
- Format: Adult contemporary
- Affiliations: Premiere Networks

Ownership
- Owner: Audacy, Inc.; (Audacy License, LLC)
- Sister stations: WBGB; WBMX; WEEI; WEEI-FM; WVEI

History
- First air date: December 15, 1957
- Former call signs: WBZ-FM (1957–1981)
- Call sign meaning: Phonetic approximation of "magic"

Technical information
- Licensing authority: FCC
- Facility ID: 25052
- Class: B
- ERP: 21,500 watts
- HAAT: 235 meters (771 ft)
- Transmitter coordinates: 42°20′50.3″N 71°4′57.1″W

Links
- Public license information: Public file; LMS
- Webcast: Listen live (via Audacy); Listen live (via iHeartRadio)
- Website: audacy.com/magic1067

WMJX (106.7 FM, "Magic 106.7") is a commercial radio station licensed to Boston, Massachusetts. Owned by Audacy, Inc., the station serves Greater Boston and much of surrounding New England with an adult contemporary format. WMJX's studios are located in Boston's Allston–Brighton neighborhood, while the transmitter resides on the Prudential Tower in Downtown Boston. Besides a standard analog transmission, WMJX broadcasts in HD Radio and is available online via Audacy and iHeartRadio.

== History ==
=== Previous FM installation ===
The first WBZ-FM had its origins in a construction permit held by Westinghouse Electric & Manufacturing Company to operate at 42.6 MHz; this facility signed on as W1XK on November 7, 1940, from the Hull transmitter site of sister station WBZ. Westinghouse soon sought a commercial FM license, and on February 19, 1941, was granted a construction permit for W67B on 46.7, W1XK left the air for good on December 28, 1941, and W67B signed on March 29, 1942. The call letters became WBZ-FM on November 2, 1943. Initially, W67B/WBZ-FM was largely separately-programmed, though in later years it became a simulcast of its AM sister station.

After the Federal Communications Commission (FCC) moved the FM band to 88–106 MHz (later expanded to 108), WBZ-FM began to operate on 100.7 MHz on January 1, 1946 (while still operating on 46.7 as well). The frequency again changed to 92.9 MHz on August 10, 1947 (the 100.7 frequency was reoccupied by WCOP-FM, now WZLX, in 1948). WBZ-FM's transmitter moved to the WBZ-TV (channel 4) tower at the stations' new studios in the Allston-Brighton portion of Boston in 1948, with 92.9 operations from Hull ceasing on July 23, 1948, and the 46.7 operation shutting down on November 21, 1948. After the WBZ-TV tower was destroyed by Hurricane Carol on August 31, 1954, WBZ-FM's operations were discontinued and the license surrendered to the FCC, which deleted it and a Springfield sister station, WBZA-FM (97.1), on November 22, 1954. (The 92.9 frequency has been occupied by WBOS since 1960.)

=== WBZ-FM (1957–1981) ===
After securing a new license for operation on 106.7 MHz, Westinghouse signed on a second WBZ-FM on December 15, 1957. The station initially operated only from 5:00 p.m. to midnight with a classical music format branded "Westinghouse Fine Music in Boston"; in 1959, WBZ-FM expanded its operating hours by simulcasting the AM sister station during periods in which the station had signed off. After live programming was replaced with tapes of classical music in January 1960, WBZ-FM's separate programming was expanded, with the simulcast continuing in mornings.

On December 31, 1971, WBZ-FM became a rock music station as "Rockin' Stereo 106.7", programming mostly top 40 with some album cuts. Although automated, it featured voice-tracked announcing from Clark Smidt (who also programmed the station) and Ken Shelton. For a time in the mid-1970s, WBZ-FM was Boston's second most popular top 40 station, only trailing WRKO. In 1975, both Smidt and Shelton left to join WCOZ, which was changing formats from beautiful music to album-oriented rock. By 1979, WBZ-FM had drifted into an automated album-oriented rock format itself, which remained in place through 1981. As a rock station, WBZ-FM also simulcast the hourly newscasts from the AM side, the commercial spots on which were the only commercials heard on the FM side.

=== Switch to Magic ===
In June 1981, Westinghouse Broadcasting (Group W) announced the sale of WBZ-FM to Greater Media for $5 million, becoming that company's first Boston station. The divestiture came as Group W sought to realign its FM station holdings, with a focus on new markets. Concurrently with the sale, Westinghouse applied to change the station's call sign to WMJX, a call sign similar to existing Greater Media properties WMGK in Philadelphia and WMJC in Detroit; the new call sign took effect on August 17, while still under Westinghouse ownership. The sale was completed on January 1, 1982. Under the new ownership, WMJX signed off for a couple of weeks at the very end of 1981. During this silent period, Greater Media installed a new transmitter and increased the height of the antenna on the WBZ-TV tower. A few years later, the transmission equipment was relocated to the Prudential Tower, improving the station's signal in Downtown Boston.

As late as the week of WMJX's relaunch, Radio & Records reported that Greater Media was considering two formats for the station: country music, or bringing its "Magic" adult contemporary format to Boston. Ultimately, on January 6, 1982, "Magic 106.7" signed on at 6 p.m., with program director Jack Casey delivering the legal ID: "This is WMJX, Boston" followed by a short welcome message from general manager Bill Campbell. The station debuted a soft adult contemporary format pioneered by Greater Media at WMGK in Philadelphia, and also heard on WMGQ in New Brunswick, New Jersey, and WMJC in Detroit. The first song on "Magic" was "Do You Believe in Magic" by The Lovin' Spoonful. The initial air staff consisted of (Bob) Cohen and (Lori) Kelman in the Morning; Doug Collins; Ed Brand; David Allan Boucher; and Nancy Quill. Due in part to the "get-acquainted-free offer" of commercial-free programming which "Magic" aired during its first six months of operation, the station quickly became the highest-rated adult contemporary station in Boston, reaching a 5.3 share of 12+ (according to Arbitron) listeners within its first year.

Two of the original personalities on "Magic", Nancy Quill and David Allan Boucher, would remain on the station into the 2020s; for many years, Quill was heard on middays, while Boucher hosted the popular nighttime show Bedtime Magic, voice-tracked on various stations around the country. Nancy Quill's last show on WMJX was April 3, 2020; she was let go in light of the market downturn as a result of the COVID-19 pandemic. Boucher announced his retirement on June 8, 2022. WMJX has had only four program directors during its entire run; Jack Casey was the original program director from 1981 to 1986, followed by Phil Redo. Don Kelley served as the program director from October 1989 to February 2012. Cadillac Jack was named program director in 2013.

WMJX received a "Radio Active" Grammy Award in 1998 for programming excellence. In 2007, the station was nominated for the "Adult Contemporary Station of the Year" award for the top 25 radio markets by Radio & Records magazine; other nominees included KOST in Los Angeles, WALK-FM in Patchogue, New York, WLTW in New York City, WBEB in Philadelphia, and KEZK-FM in St. Louis. In 2010, the station received the Marconi Award from the National Association of Broadcasters in the AC Station category.

In 2008, WMJX ran a contest titled Cool, Hot or Green. The prize was advertised as a new car, a choice of a "cool" Mercedes-Benz C-series sedan, a "hot" Audi TT convertible or a "green" Toyota Prius. A complaint was filed when it was learned that the prize was a two-year lease on one of the three cars, and would only be awarded if the winner qualified for the lease. In response the FCC issued a $4,000 fine to Greater Media, the station's owners.

WMJX frequently edited the songs they play to make them fit the "soft rock" format. The change in management in 2013, marked the end of the policy of "home grown" edits, and most (if not all) of these songs were replaced with the full versions that were supplied by the record companies.

=== Ownership changes ===
On July 19, 2016, Beasley Media Group announced it would acquire Greater Media and its 21 stations (including WMJX) for $240 million. The FCC approved the sale on October 6, 2016, and the sale closed on October 31, 2016.

On November 1, 2017, Beasley announced that it would swap WMJX to Entercom, in exchange for WBZ-FM, making it a sister station to longtime competitor WBMX, which broadcasts a hot AC format. The move was related to the merger of CBS Radio and Entercom, with both companies needing to divest stations to different owners to meet ownership limits and revenue concentration limits set by the FCC and the Department of Justice. The swap was completed on December 20, 2017.

== Christmas music ==
For much of the early 2000s (except for 2005), WMJX was one of the very few AC stations not to broadcast wall-to-wall Christmas music during the weeks leading up to Christmas. In 2005, WMJX joined the bandwagon and broadcast an all-Christmas format from the day after Thanksgiving through December 25, 2005. It did not do so again until 2012 (choosing to change to Christmas music on December 5, 2012), although then-sister station WROR-FM broadcast an all-Christmas format during the holidays from 2007 to 2011. However, during a 24-hour period from 6 p.m. Christmas Eve to 6 p.m. Christmas Day, WMJX presents a commercial free program called The Magic Of Christmas. Since 2013, WMJX flips to Christmas music on the Friday before Thanksgiving. For the 2020 holiday season, WMJX flipped to Christmas music approximately two weeks before Thanksgiving, on November 13, most likely in light of the COVID-19 pandemic and many crises that occurred in the year 2020.

== WMJX-HD2 ==
In early 2006, WMJX launched its digital HD2 subchannel with a smooth jazz format, a mix of traditional and contemporary jazz, fusion and new adult contemporary music.

In November 2014, WMJX-HD2 switched to all-Christmas music. During the period between mid-November and December 25 when the main channel is playing Christmas music, the HD2 channel carried the primary adult contemporary format.

The HD2 subchannel has since been turned off.

== References in popular culture ==
Experimental electronic artist Oneohtrix Point Never, who hails from Winthrop, takes his name from a play on the station's frequency number, 106.7. In 2020, Oneohtrix Point Never released "Magic Oneohtrix Point Never", paying more homage to the station's brand.
