= Andrew Kopkind =

American journalist (1935–1994)

- Born: August 24, 1935; New Haven, Connecticut, U.S.
- Died: October 23, 1994 (aged 59); Manhattan, New York City, U.S.
- Education: Cornell University (BA); London School of Economics (MS)
- Occupation: Journalist
- Known for: Reporting on 1960s political activism

Andrew Kopkind (August 24, 1935 – October 23, 1994) was an American journalist best known for his reporting during the tumult of the late 1960s; he wrote about the anti-Vietnam War protests, the civil rights movement, the Student Nonviolent Coordinating Committee (SNCC), Students for a Democratic Society (SDS), the Black Panther Party, the Weather Underground, President Lyndon B. Johnson's Great Society initiatives, and Ronald Reagan's California gubernatorial campaign.

== Early life and education ==
Kopkind was born in New Haven, Connecticut. In 1957, he received a B.A. from Cornell University, where he was editor of The Cornell Daily Sun.

== Career ==
From 1958 to 1959, Kopkind worked as a reporter for The Washington Post. He then studied at the London School of Economics, receiving an M.S. in 1961.

In 1961, Kopkind joined Time magazine, reporting mainly from California. From 1965 to 1967, he was associate editor of The New Republic; from 1965 to 1969 he was a correspondent for the New Statesman. In 1968, he founded Hard Times and worked briefly for Ramparts in 1970.

In 1968, he signed the "Writers and Editors War Tax Protest" pledge, vowing to refuse to pay taxes in protest of the Vietnam War.

From the 1970s onward, he contributed regularly to The Village Voice, The New York Review of Books, The Nation, and Grand Street.

In the early 1970s he and his longtime companion John Scagliotti hosted the Lavender Hour. the first commercial gay/lesbian radio show.

=== Author ===
Kopkind wrote two books: America: The Mixed Curse (1969) and The Thirty Years' Wars: Dispatches and Diversions of a Radical Journalist, 1965-1994, an anthology of his writing published posthumously in 1995, with an introduction by Alexander Cockburn. Kopkind died of cancer in 1994, at age 59. Upon his death, The Independent called him "the most important radical journalist of his generation". In a remembrance, the writer Calvin Trillin called him "the most entertaining person of his generation".
