= Cruel and Unusual (2006 film) =

- Directed by: Janet Baus; Dan Hunt; Reid Williams
- Produced by: Janet Baus; Dan Hunt; Reid Williams
- Cinematography: Slawomir Grunberg
- Edited by: Janet Baus; Dan Hunt; Mark Juergens; Reid Williams
- Music by: Amy Carey
- Production company: Reid Productions
- Distributed by: Alluvial Filmworks (DVD); Outcast Films(DVD)
- Release date: October 24, 2006
- Running time: 66 minutes
- Country: United States
- Language: English

Cruel and Unusual is a 2006 American documentary film directed and produced by Janet Baus, Dan Hunt and Reid Williams about the experiences of transgender women in the United States prison system. It was screened on television as Cruel and Unusual: Transgender Women in Prison.

== Synopsis ==
According to the documentary film, prisoners in the United States are incarcerated in men's or women's prisons depending on their genitals and not their gender identity. As a result, transgender women who have not had bottom surgery are incarcerated in men's prisons, and trans men in women's prisons.

The documentary focuses on five trans women, three incarcerated and two recently released from prison. At the end of the film, one of the prisoners has been released while one ends up in jail again for other offenses. In prison they are unable to continue taking hormones or to receive counseling for gender dysphoria. According to the film, transgender people are more likely than average to be imprisoned, and when in prison often face sexual violence from other prisoners. Often transgender prisoners are kept in solitary confinement to protect them from other inmates. The filmmakers set out to ask whether this situation constitutes cruel and unusual punishment and violates prisoners' Eighth Amendment rights.

== Background ==
The film took three years to make. The directors initially made contact with approximately 100 transgender prisoners. Although they had planned to feature trans men in the film, they decided to focus only on trans women due to the different issues experienced by the two groups and the complex nature of the issues faced by them in prison. To this end, they interviewed trans women in six different prisons.

== Release and reception ==
Cruel and Unusual was screened at festivals across the US and internationally including Melbourne and London. It was the Official Selection at the South by Southwest (SXSW) Film Festival in Austin, Texas, the Barcelona Gay and Lesbian Film Festival and the Copenhagen Gay and Lesbian Film Festival. It won the Documentary Award at the San Francisco International Gay and Lesbian Film Festival. It won the Jury Award for Best Documentary at the Frameline Film Festival in San Francisco and the Audience Award for Best Feature at the New York Lesbian, Gay, Bisexual, & Transgender Film Festival. It received the Freedom Award at the 2006 Outfest in Los Angeles. It was also nominated for a 2008 GLAAD Media Award for Best Documentary but lost to For the Bible Tells Me So.

Writing for the Pittsburgh Post-Gazette, L. A. Johnson called the film "shocking, heart-rending and ultimately somewhat uplifting".
