= Cairo 52 =

Trial in Egypt

The Cairo 52 were fifty-two men arrested on May 11, 2001, aboard a floating gay nightclub called the Queen Boat, which was moored on the Nile in Cairo, Egypt.

== Charges ==
Of fifty-two men arrested, fifty were charged with "habitual practice of debauchery" and "obscene behaviour" under Article 9c of Law No. 10 of 1961 on the Combating of Prostitution. Another two were charged with "contempt of religion" under Article 98f of the Penal Code. All fifty-two men pleaded innocent.

== Treatment of arrest ==
According to the International Gay and Lesbian Human Rights Commission, the men were subjected to beatings and forensic examinations to "prove their homosexuality". All fifty-two men were kept for twenty-two hours a day in two cramped cells with no beds.

== Trials ==
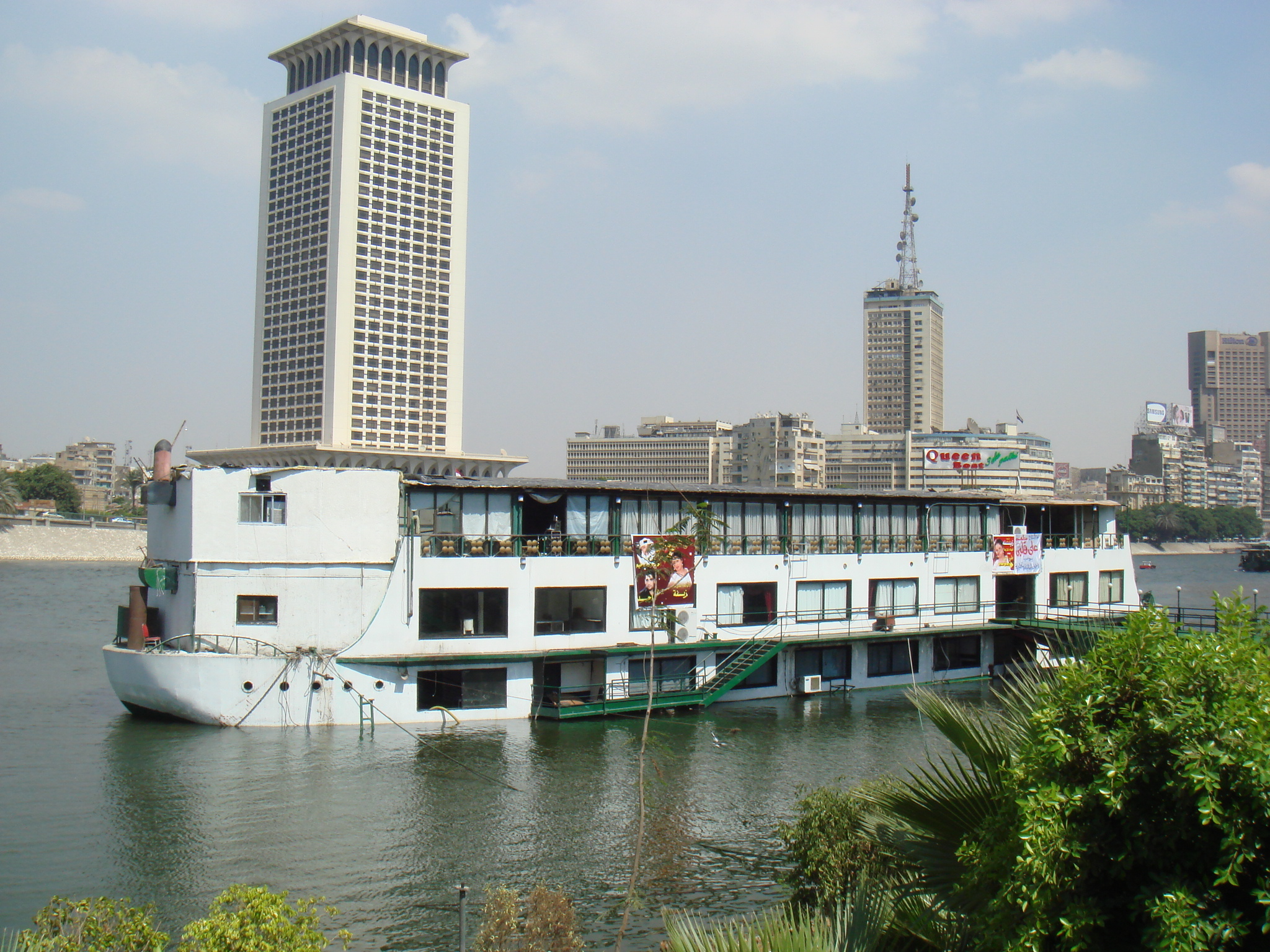
The Queen Boat

The trials of the Cairo 52 lasted five months. The defendants were vilified in the Egyptian media, which printed their real names and addresses and branded them as agents against the state. The trials were condemned by international human rights organizations, members of U.S. Congress, and the United Nations. Lawyers for the defense argued that the cases should be dismissed on the grounds of false arrest, improper arrest procedures, falsified evidence, and police intimidation. During the trial, homosexuality was characterized as "un-Egyptian".

On November 14, 2001, twenty-one of the men were convicted of "habitual practice of debauchery", one man of "contempt for religion", and another, accused of being the "ringleader", was convicted of both charges and received the heaviest sentence, five years' hard labour. A fifty-third man, a teenager, was tried in juvenile court and was sentenced to the maximum penalty of three years in prison to be followed by three years of probation.

In May 2002, those convicted were released pending a second trial; both the guilty and not-guilty verdicts were overturned, provoking international outrage. In July 2002, fifty of the men began a second trial (the other two men had been convicted of contempt for religion, and their sentences were upheld). This trial, held at Qasr-al-Nil Misdemeanors Court in Cairo and presided over by Judge Abdel Karim, the same judge who had presided over the first trial, lasted only fifteen minutes, ending when Abdel Karim recused himself. The trial was then moved to September. The retrial ended in March 2003. Twenty-one men were sentenced to three years in jail while twenty-nine men were acquitted.

== Cairo 52 in the media ==
The Cairo 52 were featured in a documentary by After Stonewall Productions, narrated by Janeane Garofalo, entitled Dangerous Living: Coming Out in the Developing World. Egyptian director Maher Sabry's film Toul Omry (All My Life) was inspired by the events. One of the Cairo 52 men is featured in Parvez Sharma's documentary A Jihad for Love (2008).
