= Oedipus (DJ) =

American radio personality

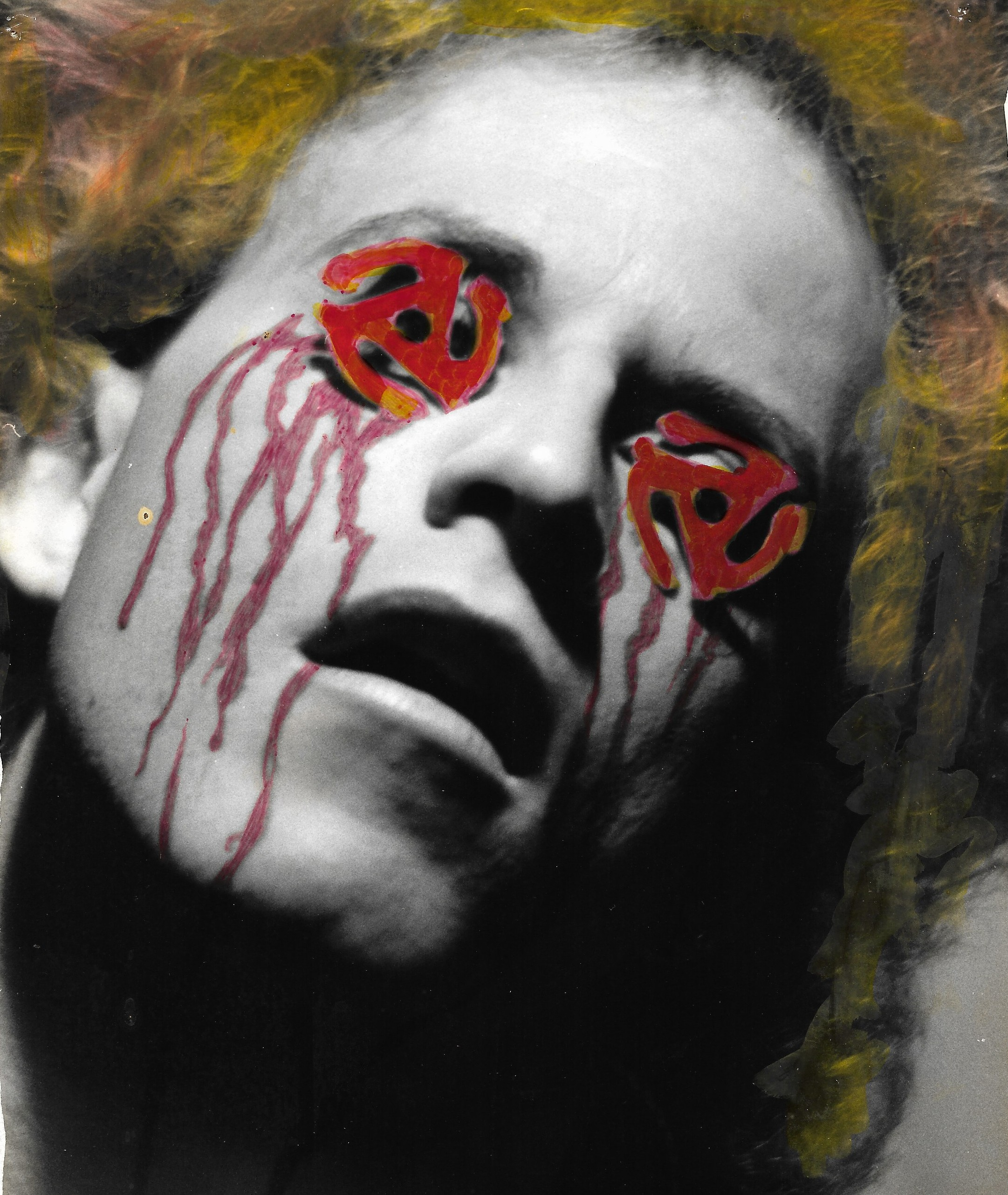
- Born: Edward Hyson; Cleveland, Ohio
- Education: Bradley University (BA); Kibbutz Ma’abarot; Chulalongkorn University-Bangkok.
- Occupations: Radio personality, DJ
- Years active: 1975-present
- Spouse: Amy Hyson (m. 2007)

Oedipus, the nom de plume, of Edward Hyson is an American radio personality. He gained notoriety as the pink-haired DJ who created the first punk rock radio show in the United States, introducing punk and new wave music to Boston. His stage name "Oedipus" was trademarked in 2014.

== Career ==
Edward Hyson began his radio career in 1975 at MIT’s college station, WTBS (now WMBR), where he created the first punk rock radio show in America. His program featured early interviews with seminal bands such as Elvis Costello, The Ramones, Talking Heads, and The Damned, and he conducted on-air conversations with The Clash, Public Image Ltd, and Suicide.

In 1977, Oedipus convinced WBCN to hire him as an announcer, to bring the Punk Rock music genra to the radio station. In 1981 he was named Program Director, a position he held until he left in 2004. Under his tutelage, the station was recognized as an industry leader in breaking new music and received countless awards for its successes. Multiple Billboard, FMQB, and Gavin Report award recipient for best Program Director of the Year, Oedipus hosted the acclaimed “Nocturnal Emissions” program for over 25 years, playing new tracks every Sunday night. In May 2001 Boston Magazine named Oedipus the third most influential person in the arts in Boston.

Besides numerous artist interviews over the course of his career Oedipus broadcast live from Moscow, underwater from the Giant Ocean Tank at the New England Aquarium, while bungee jumping over Fort Point Channel in Boston, from Abbey Road Studios interviewing Jimmy Page and Paul Rodgers and in Florida at the home of Lenny Kravitz. He also toured Japan with David Bowie.”

=== Post- WBCN career ===
After leaving WBCN in 2004, Oedipus continued his commitment to music and community through "The Oedipus Project," a platform dedicated to promoting new, alternative, and experimental music. He also hosts a weekly broadcast on Indie617, formerly RadioBDC, and his annual Christmas Eve show, "Christmas Eve with Oedipus," has been a tradition for over 30 years.

From 1995-2004 he served as Executive Producer of the live Radio broadcast for the New England Patriots.In 2016 Oedipus was inducted into the Massachusetts Broadcasters Hall of Fame (Massachusetts Broadcasters Association). He can be found in the Rock and Roll Hall of Fame in Cleveland, Ohio, in the exhibit Dedicated to the One I Love: Rock and Radio.

Oedipus hosts a website called "The Oedipus Project." The site features new music nearly every day, as well as information and insight on the music industry. It can be found at Oedipus1 He is on the Board of Advisors for Community Servings, an organization that feeds Boston-area families with acute life-threatening illnesses, and a former member of the Board of Overseers for the Huntington Theatre Company, advisory member of The Center for Arts at the Armory in Somerville and the Boston Music Awards.

=== Xmas rave and River Raves ===
The WBCN River Rave and the WBCN Xmas Rave were music festivals created by Oedipus who booked and produced the events for ten years.

The WBCN River Rave, held each summer at venues such as the Tweeter Center (now Xfinity Center) and Foxboro Stadium (now Gillette), featured a diverse lineup of alternative, punk, and rock artists on two stages (revolving for quick set changes) and a dance Rave tent. Acts like Foo Fighters, Beck, Blink-182, and Radiohead, Public Enemy, the Red Hot Chili Peppers, Coldplay, Cypress Hill, Pulp, the Strokes, Outkast, Aerosmith and Green Day were just some of the bands that played over the years.

The Xmas Rave was the winter complement to the River Rave, held on one evening at 9 different venues in Boston and Cambridge, from the Orpheum and Avalon to the Paradise and the Middle East. These holiday-themed events continued Oedipus's approach of featuring a range of both emerging and established artists, including bands such as Garbage, the Cure, Run DMC, Dave Mattews, Linkin Park, Rancid, Hole, Ben Harper, ICP, Tara MacLean, Interpol and Death Cab for Cutie.

Oedipus also hosts an annual Christmas Eve show featuring rarely heard Christmas songs. It began at WBCN in the late '70s, moved to WFNX (2009–2012), then onto RadioBDC, The Boston Globe's internet radio station (2013-2014) before moving to WGBH in 2015. In 2018, the Mayor of Boston, Marty Walsh, issued a proclamation declaring December 24, 2018, as “Christmas Eve with Oedipus Day” in the City of Boston in recognition of his annual Christmas Eve broadcast for over 30 years spreading peace, love and understanding throughout Boston and the world.

He was also thanked by the Police when they were inducted into the Rock ‘n’ Roll Hall of Fame

== Philanthropy and other activities ==
Oedipus has his own foundation, The Oedipus Foundation, and is a member of the Board of Directors for The Technology Broadcasting Corporation of MIT, Stop Handgun Violence, and an original member of the Board of Directors for Mobius (an artist-run center for experimental work in all media).

Beyond his work at WBCN, Oedipus was instrumental in organizing charitable events that integrated music with community service. He created and produced the River Raves and Christmas Raves, bi-annual concerts that featured prominent bands and supported various charitable causes. Additionally, he served as the executive producer of the WBCN Rock 'n' Roll Rumble, an annual local battle of the bands that showcased emerging talent and became a staple of Boston's music culture.
