= Charles Laquidara =

American radio disc jockey (born 1938)

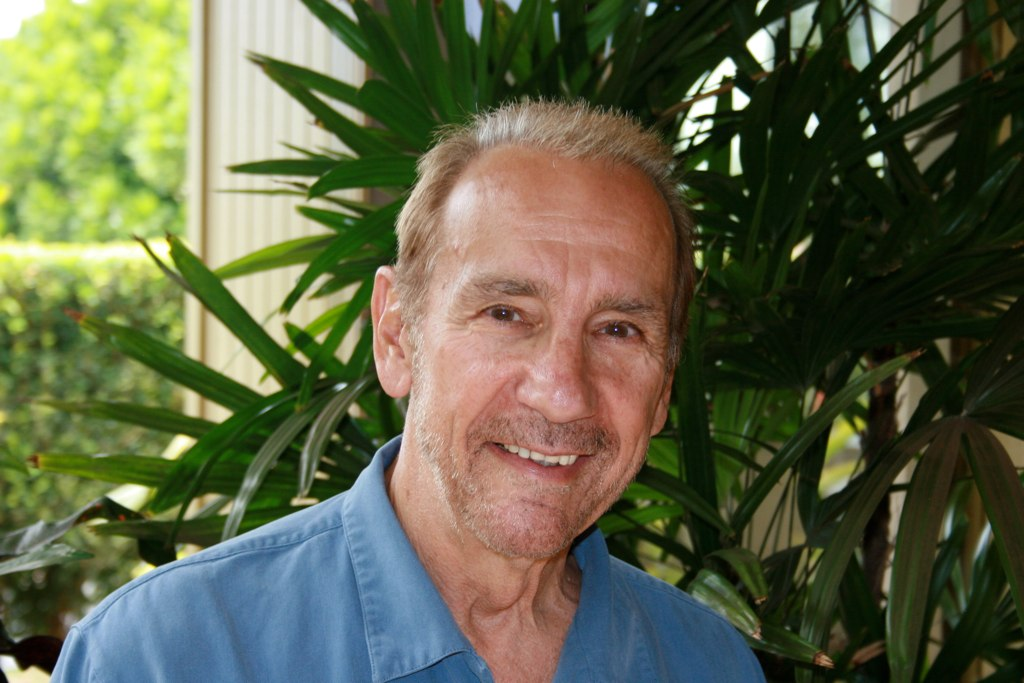
- Charles Laquidara in Maui, 2009
- Born: November 24, 1938 (age 87); Milford, Massachusetts
- Occupations: Disc jockey; actor; blogger
- Years active: 1961–present
- Spouse: Divorced

Charles Laquidara (born November 24, 1938) is an American radio disc jockey whose show, The Big Mattress, was broadcast in the Boston, Massachusetts, area for nearly 30 years (1969–1996) on WBCN. He then spent four years doing The Charles Laquidara Radio Hour on WZLX. He hosted Charles Laquidara radio, an internet radio station from his home on Maui for several years and left Hawai'i in February 2020 to be closer to his family, including his grandchildren.

Throughout his career in broadcasting, Laquidara has been known for playing a wide variety of musical styles alongside rock music, including classical, jazz, disco, soul and funk, and for being an outspoken critic of corporate governance and American right-wing politics.

== Biography ==
=== Early career ===
Born in Milford, Massachusetts, Laquidara attended Milford High School, where he was voted "most artistic" in his class. Upon graduation, he attended the Rhode Island School of Design for two years, and then in 1961 moved to Pasadena, California, where he received a bachelor's degree in theater arts at the Pasadena Playhouse. He spent the next eight years in the Los Angeles area, trying to get work as an actor in television and films. His successes in the acting field were limited to several stage roles and one appearance as a contestant on The Dating Game. He lost, but was awarded a tape recorder as a consolation prize. He was also considered for the lead in the film, The Boston Strangler, along with Alan Bates and Tony Curtis, but Curtis was ultimately awarded the lead role as Albert DeSalvo.

=== Broadcasting career ===
While seeking acting work, Laquidara worked part time in the 1960s as a classical music announcer at KPPC-FM in Pasadena, California. After several moves back and forth to his home state of Massachusetts, he eventually ended up working at KPPC full time. A columnist for the Pasadena Star-News called attention to Laquidara's unusual style in 1965. The writer described Laquidara as an aspiring actor doing radio in a then-radical way, including using long, dramatic pauses in his descriptions of the opera La bohème and often playing passages of music he admired two or more times in a row, both practices strongly discouraged by accepted radio hosting standards of the time.

==== California freeform ====
In October 1967, KPPC was purchased by the owner of San Francisco station KMPX. KPPC soon followed KMPX in adopting the new "Underground Radio" rock format known as "freeform". Laquidara's classical music background and interest in jazz also helped form the eclectic nature of the influential radio station. As described by former station manager Dave Pierce in a memoir, in the late 1960s Laquidara typically began his midnight program with "twenty minutes of bird sounds" and then "juxtaposed The Blue Danube waltz and Emerson, Lake & Palmer".

==== Return to Massachusetts ====
In 1969, he was offered an airshift at WBCN in Boston, to replace disc jockey Peter Wolf, who was leaving to join the newly formed J. Geils Band. In 1972, Laquidara took over the morning shift on WBCN — dubbed the show "The Big Mattress" — and stayed there for almost 25 years, before moving to WBCN sister station WZLX in 1996.

==== The Big Mattress ====
The Big Mattress, Laquidara's morning program, was a pioneer effort in FM broadcasting. It was one of the first FM broadcasts to feature a shifting cast of on-air personnel, including producers, writers and production staff. The program included music, news, talk and humor such as making prank phone calls to unsuspecting listeners, elements that are now a widely used characteristic of "drive time" radio. One feature of the program was a segment called "Mishigas" (Yiddish for "craziness") where the group led by Laquidara would quiz listeners, including celebrities, offering prizes for correct responses. If the listener was unable to answer the quiz, a penalty of having to "dance the Funky Chicken" was issued.

In 1976, Laquidara surprised listeners by abruptly announcing he was "quitting radio to do television and pursue other paths". Laquidara later admitted that he had quit radio in 1976 because "it was getting in the way of my cocaine habit." Laquidara retired to live in Stow, Massachusetts for almost two years and was persuaded to return to WBCN by then program director Tommy Hadges, whom he gives credit to for saving him from his drug habit. "When I came back in '78, I didn't really want to come back, because I still wanted to continue being able to do cocaine, but the money they offered me was too hard to say no to. Luckily, I agreed to do it and I'm still alive."

The Big Mattress was a top-rated Boston area radio show lasting for over twenty years.

==== Duane Ingalls Glasscock ====
As a recurring part of WBCN's The Big Mattress, Laquidara introduced his alter ego, Duane Ingalls Glasscock, who Laquidara later described as "vile, sexist". Glasscock spoke with a thick Boston accent and was used by Laquidara to point out the hypocrisy of political correctness. Duane Glasscock initially used a vulgar catchphrase suggesting anal sexual assault. When he was told not to utter the phrase on the air any more, he "cleaned it up" into the similar-sounding "Have you ever been phoned in Upton, Mass. for being a lucky prize guy?" Duane opened most of his broadcasts and segments with the phrase "Hello, Rangooooooon!", following a signature sound effect. Laquidara revealed in an interview that the Glasscock character, who hosted his "own" show on Saturday mornings at WBCN, actually received higher ratings than Laquidara's regular weekday broadcast.

The program's name was retired in 1996 when Laquidara, who at that time was one of the most highly paid disc jockeys in the country, was persuaded to move to WZLX by Oedipus, WBCN's program director. Oedipus had risen to prominence during the punk and new wave era of the late 1970s as one of Laquidara's unpaid writers. Now Laquidara's boss, Oedipus convinced him to move his show to sister station WZLX to make way for the more popular syndicated morning program of shock jock Howard Stern. The new program, called The Charles Laquidara Radio Hour, was broadcast from the Prudential Tower in Boston's Back Bay.

==== Social activism ====
From the earliest period of KPPC freeform radio and continuing throughout his career, Laquidara has participated in social activism and promoted a strongly-held liberal political stance. In his memoir of their years at KPPC entitled Riding on the Ether Express, Dave Pierce recalls a close friendship with Laquidara, who was an early vocal opponent of the Vietnam War. In December 1968, just prior to Laquidara's return to Massachusetts, Pierce and his wife and children went with Laquidara to Elysian Park in Los Angeles for a fund raising gathering they had helped promote on the radio for the Free Clinic, a local charity. The event, which was at that time a frequent counterculture form of activism, attracted 5,000 people, many of whom openly smoked marijuana. However, without warning or announced intentions, shortly after the event began several dozen carloads of Los Angeles riot police appeared and proceeded to forcibly remove the crowd from the park. After escaping a full-scale assault from the police with the Pierces, Laquidara headed immediately to KPPC and delivered a scathing ten-minute on-air diatribe against the LAPD.

Laquidara continued his sometimes controversial political activism while on-air at WBCN in Boston. Following a commercial for a camera store, he denounced Honeywell corporation anti-personnel munitions, which brought on a lawsuit from the advertiser that sold Honeywell cameras. His alter ego, Duane Glasscock, was fired for telling listeners to send "a bag of shit to the Arbitron research bureau". Arbitron is a corporation that provides the radio industry with market research and listener counts, and Laquidara used Duane to question the integrity of the powerful company. He drew national attention in 1988 for leading anti-Apartheid protests and a boycott of Shell Oil.

==== Retirement to Maui ====
Laquidara finally achieved movie acting credit in 1998, playing a small part as one of the "phone dates" in the film Next Stop Wonderland, which was shot in and around Boston. After his retirement in August 2000, Laquidara moved to Hawaii. In 2005, Laquidara sold his home in upcountry Maui for over $2 million to Oprah Winfrey, whose magazine referred to it as a "fixer-upper". In another real estate deal, two years later he sold a sprawling estate in Haiku, Hawaii, that he had purchased for $1.75 million to spiritual leader Baba Ram Dass for $2.3 million. Laquidara occasionally prepared shows for internet broadcast via Mana'o Radio KEAO-LP in Wailuku, Hawaii. He did weekly broadcasts for about a year and a half beginning in March 2005. During the first half of 2006, Laquidara broadcast a show from his home in Hawaii that aired on Boston radio station 92.9 WBOS called "Backspin". The show was short-lived, however. Laquidara resigned shortly after being chastised for playing Neil Young's song "Let's Impeach the President" during the height of the Iraq War. In 2009, Laquidara returned to Boston to mark the closing of his original station, WBCN, doing a series of interviews and hosting an exclusive tribute party at a local nightclub to which only station employees and former employees were invited. While in Boston, Laquidara was inducted as a member of the Massachusetts Broadcasters Hall of Fame in recognition of his pioneering efforts in FM radio. While living in Kihei, Hawaii, he hosted Charles Laquidara Radio, an internet radio station that played a variety of rock, nu-wave, and classic hits peppered with comedy bits, song parodies and "Mishigas" segments from The Big Mattress.

=== Present day ===
Charles was featured in a 2015 documentary about radio DJs called I Am What I Play, directed by Roger King.

At the beginning of the COVID-19 pandemic he relocated to Larkspur, California and then to Petaluma to be closer to his family, including his (now four) grandchildren.
