= John Scagliotti =

American film director

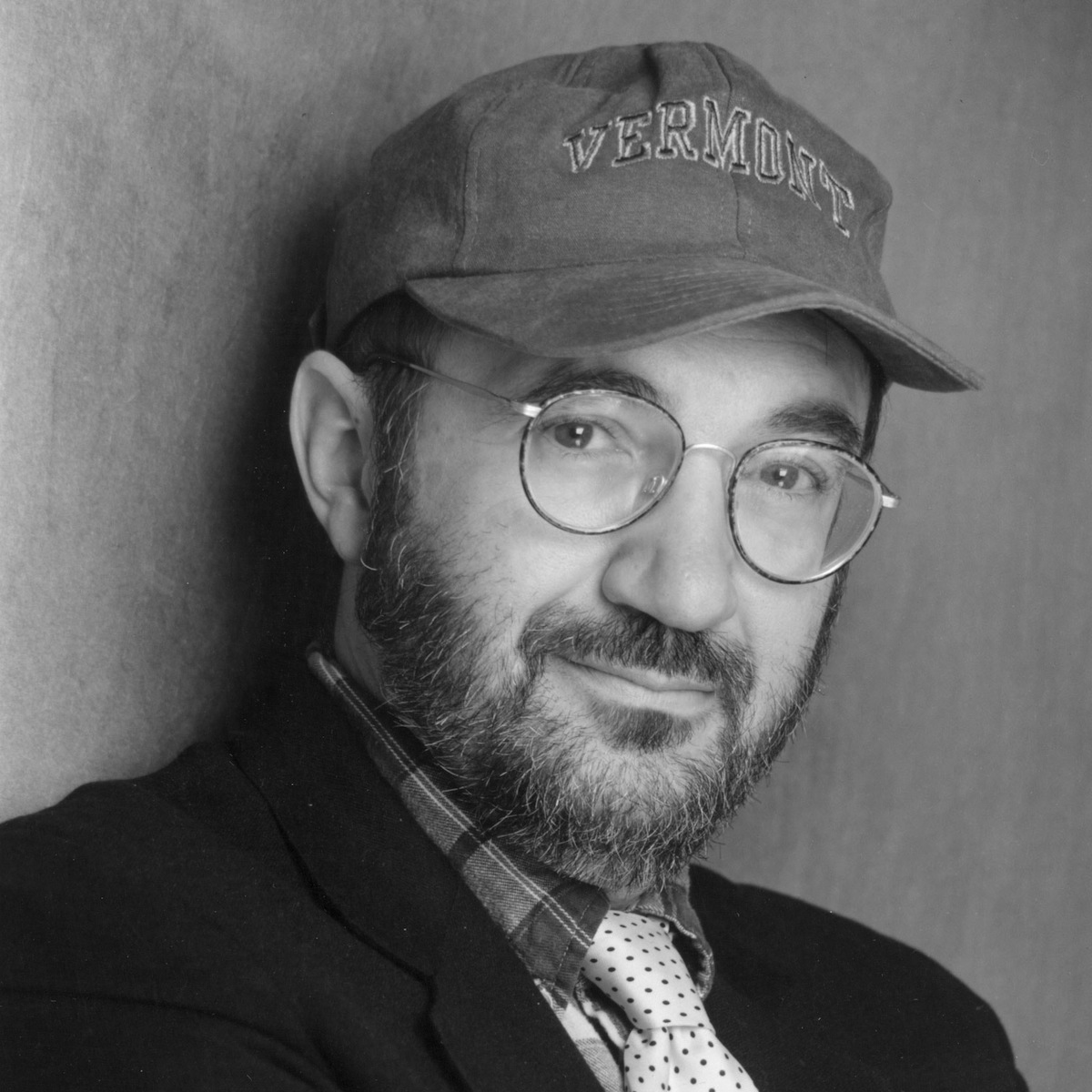
- Occupations: Film director, producer, broadcaster

John Scagliotti is an American film director and producer, and radio broadcaster. He has received honors for his work on documentaries about LGBT issues including Before Stonewall and After Stonewall.

== Biography ==
During the 1970s, Scagliotti was the News and Public Affairs Director of WBCN/104.1 in Boston. For his work in radio, he was awarded two Major Armstrong Awards. In the early 1980s, Scagliotti attended New York University Film School. He created In the Life for PBS. This was the United States' first gay and lesbian national series. The Scagliotti-produced 1985 documentary film Before Stonewall won the Audience Award at L.A. Outfest and two Emmy Awards. Scagliotti directed a companion piece, After Stonewall. The film won a Golden Eagle and the Audience Award at the Los Angeles Gay and Lesbian Film Festival. Scagliotti is openly gay. His partner for 24 years was the late journalist Andrew Kopkind. Together they produced the radio show The Lavender Hour.

== Filmography ==
- 1984: Before Stonewall (Producer)
- 1999: After Stonewall
- 2003: Dangerous Living: Coming Out in the Developing World
- 2017: Before Homosexuals — a prequel to Before Stonewall
