= All My Life (2008 film) =

- theatrical poster
- Directed by: Maher Sabry
- Written by: Maher Sabry
- Produced by: Maher Sabry
- Starring: Mazen Nassar; Jawa; Ayman; Julian Gonzalez Esparza; Mehammed Amadeus; Christopher White; Yousef El Shareif; Travis Creston; Munir Bayyari
- Cinematography: Maher Mostafa
- Edited by: Maher Sabry
- Music by: Ilyas Iliya
- Production companies: Maraia Film; Egyptian Underground Film Society
- Distributed by: Les Films de l'Ange (France)
- Release date: June 22, 2008 (Frameline Film Festival)
- Running time: 120 minutes
- Country: Egypt
- Language: Arabic

All My Life (Arabic: طول عمري; translit. Toul Omry; French: Toute ma vie), is a 2008 Egyptian film by Maher Sabry. While a work of fiction, Sabry made efforts to use real-life influences from his own experiences to the 2001 arrests of the Cairo 52 to keep the portrayal of conditions for homosexuals in Egypt accurate.

== Plot ==
The film's plot revolves around the life of Rami, a 26-year-old homosexual, his life in Cairo, and his experiences with his friends and neighbors.

== Cast and characters ==
- Mazen Nassar as Rami - a gay dance student in Cairo
- Ayman as Walid - Rami's lover who leaves him to marry a woman
- Jwana as Dalia - Rami's friend, a student who plans to study abroad to escape the conservative atmosphere in Egypt
- Louay as Kareem - Rami's friend, a doctor active in the underground gay scene
- Julian Gonzalez Esparza as Ahmad - Rami's neighbor, a devout Muslim man with an inconvenient passion for women
- Mehammed Amadeus as Mina - Rami's teenage neighbor who lives a closeted life under his strict Christian mother's roof
- Maged as Atef - a poor waiter who becomes a love interest to Rami

Other actors

- Janaan Attia ... Nurse Latifa
- Munir Bayyari ... Hany
- Monica Berini ... Office Worker
- Travis Creston ... Tourist
- Habeeb El-Deb ... Prosecutor
- Youssef El-Shareif ... Ashraf
- Sarah Enany ... Nurse Safaa / Opera Singer
- Hala Fauzi ... Belly Dancer
- Bassam Kassab ... Hatem
- Ayman Kozman ... Policeman
- Nabila Mango ... Mina's mother
- Jamal Mavrikios ... Mazen's colleague
- Amar Puri ... Amar
- Mykha Ram ... Mostafa
- Ashraf Sewailam ... Rami (voice)
- Wedad ... Khadra
- Christopher White ... Mark
- Hesham El-Tahawi ... TV actor one
- Naglaa Younis ... TV actress two
- Seham Saneya Adelsalam ... TV actress three

== Release ==
The film premiered at Frameline in San Francisco in June 2008.

== Reactions ==
Sheikh Nasr Faryd Wasel, ex-Mufti of Egypt, called for the destruction of the film, stating "these films are the gateway to debauchery, to committing that forbidden by Allah and propagate deviant social behaviors". Though he expressed desire for the film to be suppressed and held from film festivals, it was screened at various film festivals around the world in such cities as San Francisco, New York, Athens, Melbourne, Sydney, Bangalore and Ljubljana.

Dr. Zeyn il-Abedyn, Egypt's Anti-AIDS Program Director, said that the film was "a painful blow to all our efforts to combat the spread of HIV." In an interview with Arabiya.net, he stated that "Unnatural sexual practices are second only to blood transfusions as probable causes for infection with this disease", which the Egyptian Underground Film society replied is a "clear implication that HIV/AIDS only infect male homosexuals." The EUFS continued, stating: "By implying this, he completely ignores scientific fact; statistics have shown that AIDS is also widespread among heterosexuals and children. Instead of raising public awareness about safe sex, such statements are misleading and create a false sense of security; they create a popular belief that HIV/AIDS only infects a certain class of people, leading to the illusion of safety which, in turn, leads to the spread of the disease."

Regarding responses of conservative Muslim figures, Maher Sabry said "I’m not surprised that this happened. It was expected, yet it’s still painful to me, because it’s an indication of just how backward we’ve become. We’re now living in an age of cultural regression, an age where dissidents, presidential candidates and religious minorities are thrown into jail. We claim to be emulating Islamic civilization; but if the people who built that civilization were alive today, there would have been fatwas pronounced against them, and their books and other works would have been burned."

=== Awards ===
In 2011, All My Life earned the Audience Award in the category of Narrative Feature at the 7th FACE à FACE film festival. The festival is based in St Etienne, France, with the mission to promote positive attitudes towards homosexuality through art and culture.

== See also ==
- Cinema of Egypt
- Pleasure and Suffering
