= In the Life =

Television series

- The longest running LGBT documentary series on public television.
- Genre: Documentary series
- Created by: In the Life Media
- Country of origin: United States
- Original language: English
- No. of seasons: 20

Original release
- Release: June 9, 1992 – December 5, 2012

In the Life is an American television newsmagazine program focused on issues related to lesbian, gay, bisexual and transgender (LGBT) people, broadcast on public television from 1992 to 2012, and produced by In The Life Media. It was created by John Scagliotti. Running for twenty years, it was the first and longest running national LGBT television program in history.

In September 2012, In The Life Media announced that the December 2012 broadcast would be the last. ITLM said it would work with other organizations to create a web-based archive of historical videos documenting the LGBT rights movement, enhancing the organization's online presence and hopefully broadening its reach.

On March 3, 2013, UCLA Film & Television Archive officially became the new home for In the Life's full collection.

== Hosts ==
The series was regularly commentated by Harvey Fierstein from 2001 to 2004. Past hosts of the show include Kate Clinton and Katherine Linton. Guest hosts for the series have included Cherry Jones, Paris Barclay, Janeane Garofalo, Lesley Gore, Lea DeLaria, Madonna, Jade Esteban Estrada, Nathan Lane, Howard Dean, Gavin Newsom, Helen Thomas, Nancy Grace, RuPaul, Angela Lansbury, Jerry Herman, Carol Channing, Larry Kramer, Barbara Gittings, Lillian Faderman, Judy Shepard, Susan Sarandon, Billie Jean King, Lily Tomlin, Melissa Etheridge, Esera Tuaolo, Martina Navratilova, Judith Light, Margaret Cho, Le Tigre, Lady Bunny, Wilson Cruz, Alan Cumming, Bill Brochtrup, Staceyann Chin and Lisa Leslie. In its 18th season, In the Life moved from a hosted format to a documentary style narrated by guest voice-overs.

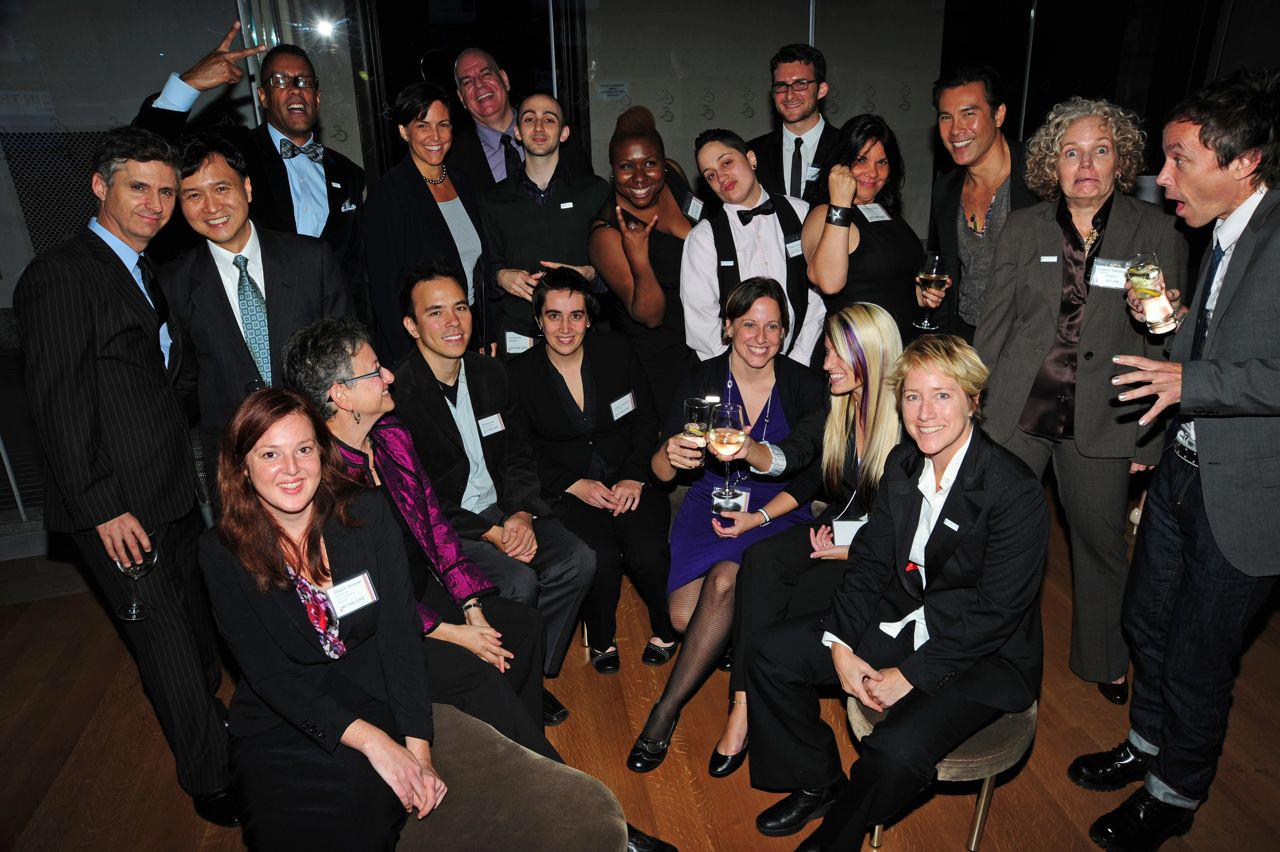
Final In The Life Media Gala at the New-York Historical Society
