= After Stonewall =

- Directed by: John Scagliotti
- Narrated by: Melissa Etheridge
- Music by: Don DiNicola
- Distributed by: First Run Features
- Release dates: June 6, 1999 (Connecticut Gay and Lesbian Film Festival)
- Running time: 88 minutes
- Country: United States
- Language: English

After Stonewall is a 1999 documentary film about the 30 years of gay rights activism since the 1969 Stonewall riots, directed by John Scagliotti. It is the sequel to the Scagliotti-produced 1984 film Before Stonewall and is narrated by musician Melissa Etheridge. Participants include Dorothy Allison, Jewelle Gomez, Rita Mae Brown, Craig Lucas, Arnie Kantrowitz, Barbara Gittings, Barbara Smith, Larry Kramer and Barney Frank.

== Participants ==
- Dorothy Allison
- Rita Mae Brown
- Anita Bryant (archive footage)
- Barney Frank
- Barbara Gittings
- Jewelle Gomez
- Harry Hay
- Larry Kramer
- Susan Moir
- Sheila James Kuehl
- Harvey Milk (archive footage)
- Yo-Yo

== Awards ==
In 1999, After Stonewall won the Audience Award for Outstanding Documentary Feature at L.A. Outfest. The following year it was nominated for a GLAAD Media Award.
