= Don DiNicola =

American musical artist

- Born: Oxnard, California
- Occupation(s): Composer, producer, music supervisor, director
- Website: dondinicola.com

Don DiNicola is an American composer, record producer and music supervisor who is known for his work in film and television. Originally from Boston, he has been in the industry for over 15 years, writing music for PBS, A&E, HBO, TLC, Discovery Channel and Sundance. He has received Emmy Award nominations for his work on the gay-rights documentary After Stonewall, which aired on PBS, and the series We Are NY. DiNicola also provided music supervision for the Emmy award-winning films Suicide Bombers/Cult of Death (Discovery) and The Art of Failure (HBO) and composed music for the Emmy-winning film Baring It All (Style).

As an original content creator, DiNicola directed Nowhere Now: The Ballad of Joshua Tree, a feature about the musical community of Joshua Tree, California. He has also directed an animated short Karma Cats.

DiNicola also composes for live theater. He is on the faculty of Vermont College of Fine Arts in the Music Composition department.
