= 2020 United States Senate election in Massachusetts =

- November 3, 2020
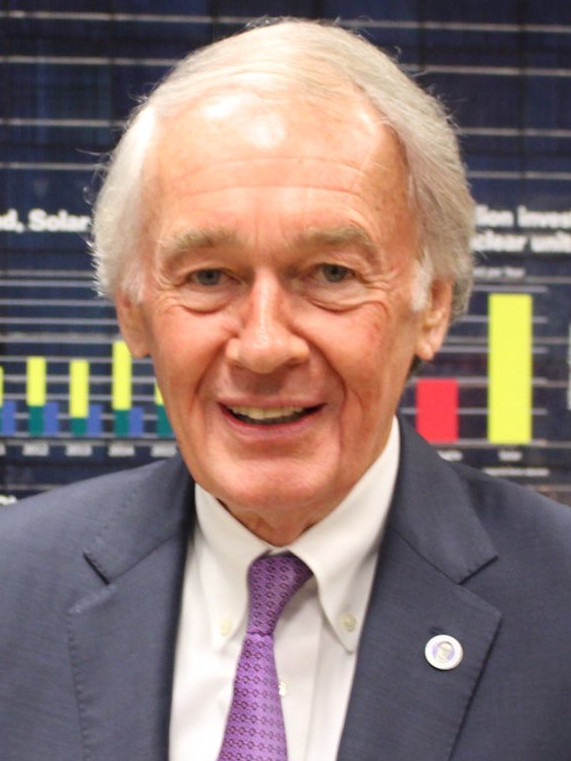

Nominee	Ed Markey	Kevin O'Connor
Party	Democratic	Republican
Popular vote	2,357,809	1,177,765
Percentage	66.15%	33.05%
- Markey: 40–50% 50–60% 60–70% 70–80% 80–90% >90% O'Connor: 40–50% 50–60% 60–70% Tie: 40–50%
U.S. senator before election
Ed Markey
Democratic
Elected U.S. Senator
Ed Markey
Democratic

The 2020 United States Senate election in Massachusetts was held on November 3, 2020, to elect a member of the United States Senate to represent the Commonwealth of Massachusetts, concurrently with the 2020 U.S. presidential election, as well as elections to the United States Senate in other states, elections to the United States House of Representatives, and various state and local elections. On September 1, incumbent Senator Ed Markey defeated U.S. Representative Joe Kennedy III in a competitive primary for the Democratic nomination, and Kevin O'Connor defeated Shiva Ayyadurai for the Republican nomination. Markey went on to win the general election with 66.2%.

== Democratic primary ==
The state primary election took place on September 1, 2020. Incumbent Senator Ed Markey was challenged by U.S. Representative Joe Kennedy III, a member of the Kennedy family. Kennedy and Markey had similar political positions, both being considered reliably liberal Democrats, though Markey was considered more left-wing on the DW-Nominate scale. An elected senator had not been defeated in a primary since Richard Lugar in 2012, and an elected Democrat had not been defeated since Joe Lieberman in 2006.

In August 2019, it was reported that Kennedy was considering a primary challenge to Markey. He announced his campaign on September 18. According to Vox, one of the main reasons for Kennedy's decision to challenge Markey, rather than waiting for a Senate seat to open up, was that Markey was perceived to be an easier opponent than the raft of candidates that would run without an incumbent. Polling of the potential match-up showed Markey trailing Kennedy by as much as 14 points, leading to speculation that he would retire rather than face a primary defeat.

Kennedy faced skepticism about his reasons for challenging Markey; journalists observed his campaign had difficulty articulating a clear rationale. Eventually, Kennedy's campaign pitch largely focused around a message that he would "show up" for disadvantaged residents of Massachusetts, something he claimed Markey had not been doing. This strategy was heavily inspired by Ayanna Pressley's successful campaign for the U.S. House the previous cycle, and was aimed at casting Kennedy as an insurgent outsider running against the establishment.

Facing a severe polling deficit, Markey undertook to politically reinvent himself; his relatively low profile in Massachusetts gave him the opportunity to define himself for the first time to many voters. The main focus of Markey's re-election strategy was to promote himself as a left-wing iconoclast who clashed with the Democratic Party apparatus; to this extent a campaign ad from 1976 wherein Markey promoted his clashes with Massachusetts political bosses was widely used by his campaign. Markey also frequently promoted an endorsement he received from New York Congresswoman Alexandria Ocasio-Cortez, a favorite of the Democratic Party's left. Ocasio-Cortez's endorsement encouraged left-wing activist organizations to also support Markey, and resulted in the incumbent developing a large following on the internet.

Support from within the Democratic Party was divided. Markey received support from the DSCC, Senate minority leader Chuck Schumer, and DSCC chair Catherine Cortez Masto. He was also endorsed by key figures in the party's progressive wing, such as Ocasio-Cortez, fellow Massachusetts Senator Elizabeth Warren, and the youth-led Sunrise Movement. Kennedy received various endorsements from the House leadership, including Speaker Nancy Pelosi, House Majority Leader Steny Hoyer, House Democratic Caucus chair Hakeem Jeffries, House Intelligence Committee chair Adam Schiff, and House Democratic Senior Chief Deputy Whip John Lewis.

As the campaign progressed, Markey began to explicitly criticize the Kennedy family, deeming them as emblematic of privilege, and frequently contrasting the Kennedy Compound with his own upbringing in Malden. Kennedy attacked Markey for these actions, accusing him of "weaponizing" the history of the Kennedy family. As the race entered its final days the contest began to assume an ideological meaning, with New York writer Gabriel Debendetti writing that the contest was viewed as a "fight for the soul of the national Democratic party", with both candidates claiming that a victory for them would be an affirmation of the strength of the left wing of the Democrats.

=== Candidates ===
==== Nominee ====
- Ed Markey, incumbent U.S. senator

==== Eliminated in primary ====
- Joe Kennedy III, U.S. representative from Massachusetts's 4th congressional district, and grandson of former attorney general and former U.S. Senator Robert F. Kennedy

==== Withdrawn ====
- Washington Blask
- Shannon Liss-Riordan, labor attorney
- Steve Pemberton, chief human resources officer of Workhuman (endorsed Markey)
- Allen Waters, perennial candidate (endorsed Kennedy)

==== Declined ====
- Maura Healey, Massachusetts Attorney General
- Scott Lang, former mayor of New Bedford (endorsed Kennedy)
- Juana Matias, former state representative and candidate for Massachusetts's 3rd congressional district in 2018
- Seth Moulton, former 2020 presidential candidate and U.S. representative from Massachusetts's 6th congressional district (ran for re-election)
- Michelle Wu, Boston City Councilor

=== Endorsements ===
Joe Kennedy III

U.S. executive branch officials

- Robert A. Sherman, former United States ambassador to Portugal (2014–2017)
- Alan Solomont, former United States ambassador to Spain and Andorra (2010–2013)
- Barry B. White, former United States ambassador to Norway (2009–2013)

U.S. senators

- Kyrsten Sinema, U.S. senator from Arizona

U.S. representatives

- Pete Aguilar, U.S. representative (CA-31st)
- Colin Allred, U.S. representative (TX-32nd)
- Joyce Beatty, U.S. representative (OH-3rd)
- Anthony Brown, U.S. representative (MD-4th) and lawyer
- Joaquin Castro, U.S. representative (TX-20th) and chair of the Congressional Hispanic Caucus
- David Cicilline, U.S. representative (RI-1st) and co-chair of the Congressional LGBT Equality Caucus
- Gil Cisneros, U.S. representative (CA-39th), philanthropist, and veteran
- Emanuel Cleaver, U.S. representative (MO-5th) and United Methodist pastor
- Angie Craig, U.S. representative (MN-2nd)
- Sharice Davids, U.S. representative (KS-3rd), attorney, and former mixed martial artist
- Veronica Escobar, U.S. representative (TX-16th)
- Adriano Espaillat, U.S. representative (NY-13th)
- Ruben Gallego, U.S. representative (AZ-7th)
- Al Green, U.S. representative (TX-9th)
- Raúl Grijalva, U.S. representative (AZ-3rd)
- Steny Hoyer, House Majority Leader and U.S. Representative (MD-5th)
- Hakeem Jeffries, Chair of the House Democratic Caucus, U.S. representative (NY-8th) and attorney
- Eddie Bernice Johnson, U.S. representative (TX-30th) and chair of the House Science Committee
- Joseph P. Kennedy II, U.S. representative (MA-8th) (1987–1999) (candidate's father)
- Derek Kilmer, U.S. representative (WA-6th) and chair of the New Democrat Coalition
- Ann Kirkpatrick, U.S. representative (AZ-2nd)
- Annie Kuster, U.S. representative (NH-2nd), author, and attorney
- Conor Lamb, U.S. representative (PA-17th), attorney, former federal prosecutor and former Marine
- John Lewis, U.S. representative (GA-05) (1987–2020), House Democratic Senior Chief Deputy Whip (1991–2020), Chair of the Student Nonviolent Coordinating Committee (1963–1966) (deceased)
- Sean Patrick Maloney, U.S. representative (NY-18th) and co-chair of the Congressional LGBT Equality Caucus
- Stephanie Murphy, U.S. representative (FL-7th), business consultant, and professor
- Beto O'Rourke, U.S. representative (TX-16th) (2013–2019), 2020 Democratic presidential candidate
- Nancy Pelosi, Speaker of the House of Representatives and U.S. Representative (CA-12th)
- Mark Pocan, U.S. representative (WI-2nd), co-chair of the Congressional Progressive Caucus, and businessman
- Katie Porter, U.S. representative (CA-45th), law professor, and attorney
- Jamie Raskin, U.S. representative (MD-8th)
- Linda Sánchez, U.S. representative (CA-38th) and former labor lawyer
- Adam Schiff, U.S. representative (CA-28th) and chair of the House Intelligence Committee
- Elissa Slotkin, U.S. representative (MI-8th)
- Norma Torres, U.S. representative (CA-35th)
- Xochitl Torres Small, U.S. representative (NM-2nd) and lawyer
- David Trone, U.S. representative (MD-6th) and businessman
- Lauren Underwood, U.S. representative (IL-14th)
- Juan Vargas, U.S. representative (CA-51st)
- Marc Veasey, U.S. representative (TX-33rd)
- Filemon Vela Jr., U.S. representative (TX-34th)

Statewide politicians

- Sila María Calderón, former governor of Puerto Rico (2001–2005)
- Gabriel E. Gomez, Republican nominee in the special election in 2013
- Sharon Pollard, former Massachusetts Secretary of Energy, former mayor of Methuen and former State Senator
- Bill Weld, 2020 Republican presidential candidate, former governor of Massachusetts (1991–1997), Republican nominee for this seat in 1996, 2016 Libertarian vice presidential nominee

State legislators

- Joe Boncore, state senator
- Diana DiZoglio, state senator
- Paul Feeney, state senator
- Tom Golden, state representative
- Adam G. Hinds, state senator
- Patrick J. Kearney, state representative
- Eric Lesser, state senator
- Mark Montigny, state senator
- Steven C. Panagiotakos, former State Senator
- Jeffrey Roy, state representative
- Jon Santiago, state representative
- Chynah Tyler, state representative

Local politicians

- Kimberley Driscoll, mayor of Salem
- Ruthanne Fuller, mayor of Newton
- John Leahy, mayor of Lowell (Independent)
- Raymond Mariano, former mayor of Worcester
- Matt O'Malley, Boston City Councilor
- Yvonne Spicer, mayor of Framingham

Individuals

- Brent Budowsky, political opinion writer and columnist
- Jason Collins, former NBA player
- Dropkick Murphys, punk rock band
- Tiffani Faison, chef and LGBTQ advocate
- Dolores Huerta, labor leader and civil rights activist
- Victoria Kennedy, lawyer and widow of candidate's great-uncle, Ted Kennedy
- Martin Luther King III, human rights advocate and former President of the Southern Christian Leadership Conference (son of Martin Luther King Jr. and Coretta Scott King)
- Jim Obergefell, civil rights activist

Labor unions

- American Federation of Musicians Local 9-535
- International Association of Bridge, Structural, Ornamental and Reinforcing Iron Workers Local 7
- International Brotherhood of Electrical Workers Local 103, 104, 1505, 223, 455, 326, 2325, 2321, 1499, 2222
- International Brotherhood of Teamsters Local 25
- International Union of Operating Engineers Local 4
- Laborers' International Union of Massachusetts
- Massachusetts Building Trades Council
- Massachusetts State Council of Machinists
- Sheet Metal Workers' International Association Local 17
- United Food and Commercial Workers Local 791
- Utility Workers Union of America Local 369

Newspapers

- The Berkshire Eagle
- Irish Voice
- Springfield Republican
- The Sun
Ed Markey

Executive officials

- Al Gore, 45th vice president of the United States (1993–2001), U.S. senator from Tennessee (1985–1993)

U.S. senators

- Cory Booker, U.S. senator from New Jersey
- Catherine Cortez Masto, U.S. senator from Nevada
- Dick Durbin, U.S. senator from Illinois and Senate Minority Whip
- Joe Manchin, U.S. senator from West Virginia
- Chuck Schumer, U.S. senator from New York and Senate Minority Leader
- Jeanne Shaheen, U.S. senator from New Hampshire
- Elizabeth Warren, U.S. senator from Massachusetts and former 2020 presidential candidate

U.S. representatives

- Bill Keating, U.S. representative (MA-09)
- Ro Khanna, U.S. representative (CA-17)
- Stephen F. Lynch, U.S. representative (MA-08)
- Carolyn Maloney, U.S. representative (NY-12) and Chair of the House Oversight Committee
- Jim McGovern, U.S. representative (MA-02)
- Jerry Nadler, U.S. representative (NY-10) and Chair of the House Judiciary Committee
- Richard Neal, U.S. representative (MA-01)
- Alexandria Ocasio-Cortez, U.S. representative (NY-14)
- Lori Trahan, U.S. representative (MA-03)

Statewide politicians

- Suzanne M. Bump, state auditor, former state representative and state secretary of Labor and Workforce Development
- Michael Dukakis, 1988 Democratic presidential nominee, former governor of Massachusetts (1975–1979, 1983–1991)
- Steven Grossman, former Treasurer and Receiver-General of Massachusetts, former national chair of the Democratic National Committee

State officials

- James Arciero, state representative
- Brian Ashe, state representative
- Bruce Ayers, state representative
- Ruth Balser, state representative
- Christine Barber, state representative
- John Barrett, state representative
- Michael J. Barrett, state senator
- Jennifer Benson, former state representative
- Natalie Blais, state representative
- Charles Booker, Kentucky state representative and former candidate in the Democratic Party's primary for the U.S. Senate
- Michael Brady, state senator
- Will Brownsberger, state senator
- Daniel Cahill, state representative
- Linda Dean Campbell, state representative
- Peter Capano, state representative
- Daniel R. Carey, state representative
- Gerard Cassidy, state representative
- Tackey Chan, state representative
- Sonia Chang-Díaz, state senator
- Michelle Ciccolo, state representative
- Jo Comerford, state senator
- Mike Connolly, state representative
- Cynthia Stone Creem, state senator
- Brendan Crighton, state senator
- Dan Cullinane, state representative
- Mark Cusack, state representative
- Josh S. Cutler, state representative
- Michael Day, state representative
- Marjorie Decker, state representative
- Bob DeLeo, Speaker of the Massachusetts House of Representatives
- Marcos Devers, state representative
- Sal DiDomenico, state senator
- Mindy Domb, state representative
- Dan Donahue, state representative
- Paul Donato, state representative
- William Driscoll, state representative
- Michelle DuBois, state representative
- Carolyn Dykema, state representative
- Lori Ehrlich, state representative
- James B. Eldridge, state senator
- Nika Elugardo, state representative
- Tricia Farley-Bouvier, state representative
- Dylan Fernandes, state representative
- Barry Finegold, state senator
- Carole Fiola, state representative
- Cindy Friedman, state senator
- William C. Galvin, state representative
- Sean Garballey, state representative
- Colleen Garry, state representative
- Carmine Gentile, state representative
- Anne Gobi, state senator
- Carlos Gonzalez, state representative
- Ken Gordon, state representative
- Tami Gouveia, state representative
- Danielle Gregoire, state representative
- Patricia Haddad, state representative
- Richard Haggerty, state representative
- Stephan Hay, state representative
- Jon Hecht, state representative
- Christopher Hendricks, state representative
- Natalie Higgins, state representative
- Russell Holmes, state representative
- Kevin Honan, state representative
- Daniel J. Hunt, state representative
- Patricia D. Jehlen, state senator
- Louis Kafka, state representative
- Mary Keefe, state representative
- John Keenan, state senator
- Ed Kennedy, state senator
- Kay Khan, state representative
- Kathleen LaNatra, state representative
- John J. Lawn, state representative
- David LeBoeuf, state representative
- Jack Patrick Lewis, state representative
- Jason Lewis, state senator
- David Linsky, state representative
- Jay Livingstone, state representative
- Joan Lovely, state senator
- Adrian Madaro, state representative
- John J. Mahoney, state representative
- Liz Malia, state representative
- Ronald Mariano, state representative, House Majority Leader
- Paul Mark, state representative
- Christopher Markey, state representative
- Joe McGonagle, state representative
- Joan Meschino, state representative
- Christina Minicucci, state representative
- Liz Miranda, state representative
- Rady Mom, state representative
- Michael O. Moore, state senator
- Frank A. Moran, state representative
- Michael Moran, state representative
- Susan Moran, state senator
- James M. Murphy, state representative
- Harold Naughton Jr., state representative
- Tram Nguyen, state representative
- Bill Owens, former state senator
- Marc Pacheco, state senator
- Jerry Parisella, state representative
- Sarah Peake, state representative
- Alice Peisch, state representative
- Thomas Petrolati, state representative
- Denise Provost, state representative
- Becca Rausch, state senator
- Dave Robertson, state representative
- Maria Robinson, state representative
- Michael Rodrigues, state senator
- Dave Rogers, state representative
- John H. Rogers, state representative
- Michael F. Rush, state senator
- Daniel Joseph Ryan, state representative
- Lindsay N. Sabadosa, state representative
- Paul Schmid, state representative
- Dan Sena, state representative
- Alan Silvia, state representative
- Theodore C. Speliotis, state representative
- Karen Spilka, President of the Massachusetts Senate
- Thomas Stanley, state representative
- Jose Tosado, state representative
- Paul Tucker, state representative
- Steven Ultrino, state representative
- Andy Vargas, state representative
- RoseLee Vincent, state representative
- Thomas Walsh, state representative
- James T. Welch, state senator
- Bud Williams, state representative
- Dan Wolf, former state senator and pilot
- Jonathan Zlotnik, state representative

Local officials

- Felix D. Arroyo, Suffolk County Register of Probate
- Kenzie Bok, Boston city councilor
- Daniel E. Bosley, North Adams fmr. state representative
- Liz Breadon, Boston city councilor
- Paul A. Brodeur, mayor of Melrose, former state representative
- Gary Christenson, mayor of Malden
- Carmen Yulín Cruz, mayor of San Juan, Puerto Rico
- Joseph Curtatone, mayor of Somerville
- Stephen DiNatale, mayor of Fitchburg
- Lydia Edwards, Boston city councilor
- Annissa Essaibi George, Boston city councilor
- Paul Heroux, mayor of Attleboro
- Thomas P. Koch, mayor of Quincy
- Thomas M. McGee, mayor of Lynn
- Joseph Petty, mayor of Worcester
- Rachael Rollins, district attorney of Suffolk County
- Marty Walsh, mayor of Boston

Individuals

- Ady Barkan, health activist
- Harry Belafonte, singer, songwriter, activist, and actor
- Jamaal Bowman, Democratic nominee for New York's 16th congressional district
- Doris Bunte, first Black woman elected to the Massachusetts House of Representatives
- Ken Burns, filmmaker
- Michael Douglas, actor
- Jane Fonda, actor and political activist
- Ayana Elizabeth Johnson, marine biologist, policy expert, and conservation strategist
- Tom Joyce, Washington Examiner contributor (primary only)
- Carole King, singer
- Marlee Matlin, actress, author, and activist
- Sara Nelson, union leader
- Joshua Rush, actor
- David Sirota, journalist
- Gloria Steinem, journalist and activist
- Tom Steyer, hedge fund manager, liberal activist, former candidate for 2020 Democratic presidential nomination
- Zephyr Teachout, law professor at Fordham University
- Raphael Warnock, pastor of Ebenezer Baptist Church and candidate for U. S. Senate in Georgia
- Sheldon Glashow, Sheldon Krimsky, Stuart Newman, Richard J. Roberts, Alan Robock, Frederick P. Salvucci, Elaine Scarry, Mriganka Sur, scientists and academics

Unions

- AFSCME Council 93
- American Federation of Government Employees
- American Federation of Teachers Massachusetts
- American Postal Workers Union Local 4553
- Association of Flight Attendants-CWA
- Communications Workers of America District 1
- Massachusetts Teachers Association
- SEIU 32BJ
- UNITE HERE Local 26
- United Food and Commercial Workers Local 1459

Organizations

- 350 Action
- Center for Biological Diversity
- Clean Water Action
- Climate Hawks Vote
- Council for a Livable World
- Daily Kos
- Democratic Senatorial Campaign Committee
- Democracy for America
- Environment America - Massachusetts
- Environment America - national
- Human Rights Campaign
- Indivisible
- Jewish Democratic Council of America
- Joint Action Committee for Political Affairs
- League of Conservation Voters
- Massachusetts Democratic Party
- Massachusetts Peace Action
- MoveOn
- NARAL Pro-Choice America
- National Association of Social Workers
- National Committee to Preserve Social Security and Medicare
- NRDC Action Fund
- Our Revolution Massachusetts
- Peace Action
- Planned Parenthood
- Population Connection
- Progressive Change Campaign Committee
- Progressive Democrats of America
- Sierra Club
- Sunrise Movement
- Working Families Party

Newspapers

- The Boston Globe
- Daily Hampshire Gazette
- The Daily Item
- Gloucester Daily Times
- The Salem News

=== Fundraising ===
Campaign finance reports as of August 12, 2020
Candidate	Raised	Spent	Cash on hand
Ed Markey (D)	$11,083,613	$10,402,461	$3,535,316
Joe Kennedy III (D)	$8,542,661	$11,661,569	$1,378,349
Source: Federal Election Commission

=== Polling ===
View source data.

Joe Kennedy III vs. Ed Markey
Source of poll aggregation	Dates administered	Date updated	Joe Kennedy III	Ed Markey	Undecided (Note: Calculated by taking the difference of 100% and all other candidates combined.)	Margin
RealClearPolitics	July 31 – August 27, 2020	August 27, 2020	40.8%	52.0%	7.2%	Markey +11.2

Poll source	Date(s) administered	Sample size (Note: Key: A – all adults RV – registered voters LV – likely voters V – unclear)	Margin of error	Ed Markey	Maura Healey	Shannon Liss-Riordan	Joe Kennedy III	Seth Moulton	Steve Pemberton	Allen Waters	Other	Undecided
Emerson College/WHDH	August 25–27, 2020	453 (LV)	± 4.6%	56%	–	–	44%	–	–	–	–	–
Data for Progress	August 24–25, 2020	731 (LV)	± 4%	50%	–	–	43%	–	–	–	–	7%
Suffolk University	August 23–25, 2020	500 (LV)	–	51%	–	–	41%	–	–	–	0% (Note: "Refused" with 0%)	8%
UMass Lowell	August 13–21, 2020	800 (LV)	± 4.1%	52%	–	–	40%	–	–	–	2% (Note: "Another candidate" with 2%)	6%
SurveyUSA/Priorities for Progress	August 12–16, 2020	558 (LV)	± 4.2%	44%	–	–	42%	–	–	–	–	15%
UMassAmherst/WCVB	July 31 – August 7, 2020	362 (LV)	± 7.0%	51%	–	–	36%	–	–	–	1%	12%
JMC Analytics and Polling	July 29–30, 2020	500 (LV)	± 4.4%	44%	–	–	41%	–	–	–	–	16%
Emerson College	May 5–6, 2020	620 (LV)	± 3.9%	42%	–	–	58%	–	–	–	–	–
University of Massachusetts Lowell	April 27 – May 1, 2020	531 (LV)	± 7.8%	42%	–	–	44%	–	–	–	4% (Note: "Another candidate" with 4%)	10%
Suffolk University/Boston Globe/WBZ	February 26–28, 2020	465 (LV)	± 4.4%	36%	–	–	42%	–	–	–	1% (Note: "Refused" with 1%)	21%
UMass Amherst/WCVB	February 18–24, 2020	400 (LV)	± 5.9%	43%	–	–	40%	–	–	–	4%	13%
UMass Lowell/YouGov	February 12–19, 2020	450 (LV)	± 6.1%	34%	–	–	35%	–	–	–	–	23%
	Jan 17, 2020	Liss-Riordan withdraws from the race										
	Dec 16, 2019	Waters withdraws from the race										
	Oct 14, 2019	Pemberton withdraws from the race										
	Sep 21, 2019	Kennedy announces his candidacy										
Suffolk University/Boston Globe	September 3–5, 2019	500 (LV)	± 4.4%	28%	–	–	42%	–	–	–	–	29%
Suffolk University/Boston Globe	September 3–5, 2019	500 (LV)	± 4.4%	26%	–	<1%	35%	–	1%	0%	–	36%
Change Research	August 23–25, 2019	808 (RV)	± 3.5%	25%	–	5%	42%	–	7%	–	–	–
	Jul 23, 2019	Pemberton announces his candidacy										
Suffolk University	June 5–9, 2019	370 (LV)	± 5.1%	44%	–	5%	–	–	5%	–	–	45%
	May 20, 2019	Liss-Riordan announces her candidacy										
	May 19, 2019	Healey announces that she will not run										
	Apr 1, 2019	Waters announces his candidacy										
	Dec 14, 2018	Moulton announces that he will not run										
YouGov/UMass Amherst	November 7–14, 2018	635 (RV)	–	26%	27%	–	–	–	–	–	–	35%
YouGov/UMass Amherst	November 7–14, 2018	636 (RV)	–	29%	–	–	–	25%	–	–	–	38%
	Oct 5, 2018	Markey announces his candidacy										
Suffolk University	September 13–17, 2018	433 (LV)	–	24%	–	–	–	18%	–	–	–	45%

=== Debates ===
2020 United States Senate election in Massachusetts Democratic primary debate
No.	Date	Host	Moderator	Link	Democratic	Democratic
Key: P Participant A Absent N Not invited I Invited W Withdrawn						
Key: P Participant A Absent N Not invited I Invited W Withdrawn					Ed Markey	Joe Kennedy III
1	February 18, 2020	WGBH-TV	Jim Braude; Margery Eagan		P	P
2	February 18, 2020	WBTS-CD	Latoyia Edwards		P	P
3	August 11, 2020	WBZ-TV	Jon Keller		P	P

=== Results ===
Markey defeated his challenger, Joe Kennedy III. Markey won by running up big margins in Boston and its suburbs, and did well in western Massachusetts, especially in college towns. Kennedy did well in the Cape Cod region, and won many Southern municipalities, especially his native 4th district. Despite Kennedy's strength in Southern Massachusetts, Markey defeated Kennedy in portions of the 4th district near Boston, carrying Kennedy's hometown of Newton by 28.2% and neighboring Brookline by 39%. Markey's margin of victory of 10.8% was attributed to his unexpected strength among progressives and younger voters. Kennedy's loss marked the first time a member of the Kennedy family had lost an election in Massachusetts.

Results by municipality: Markey: 40–50%; 50–60%; 60–70%; 70–80%; 80–90%; Kennedy: 40–50%; 50–60%; 60–70%; 70–80% Tie

Results by precinct: Markey: 40–50%; 50–60%; 60–70%; 70–80%; 80–90%; >90%; Kennedy: 40–50%; 50–60%; 60–70%; 70–80%; 80–90%; Tie No data/No votes

Democratic primary results
Party	Candidate	Votes	%
Democratic	Ed Markey (incumbent)	782,694	55.35%
Democratic	Joe Kennedy III	629,359	44.51%
Democratic	Write-ins	1,935	0.14%
Total votes		1,413,988	100.00%

== Republican primary ==
The state primary election took place on September 1, 2020.

=== Candidates ===
==== Nominee ====
- Kevin O'Connor, attorney

==== Eliminated in primary ====
- Shiva Ayyadurai, entrepreneur, conspiracy theorist, and independent candidate for the U.S. Senate in 2018 (ran as an Independent (write-in) in the general election)

==== Declined ====
- Charlie Baker, governor of Massachusetts (endorsed O'Connor)

=== Results ===
Results by municipality

Republican primary results
Party	Candidate	Votes	%
Republican	Kevin O'Connor	158,590	59.71%
Republican	Shiva Ayyadurai	104,782	39.45%
Republican	Write-ins	2,245	0.84%
Total votes		265,617	100.00%

== Other candidates ==
=== Libertarian Party ===
==== Failed to qualify ====
- Vermin Supreme, performance artist and political satirist; member of the Libertarian Party Judiciary Committee; former 2020 Libertarian presidential candidate (as a write-in candidate)

==== Results ====
Libertarian primary results
Party	Candidate	Votes	%
Libertarian	Other write-ins	3,390	99.21%
Libertarian	Vermin Supreme (write-in)	27	0.79%
Total votes		3,417	100.00%

=== Green Party ===
==== Withdrawn ====
- Andre "Maha Visnu" Gray, co-chair of the Massachusetts Green-Rainbow Party, teacher, and businessman

=== Independents ===
==== Write-in candidate ====
- Shiva Ayyadurai (switched to this candidacy after losing Republican primary)

==== Withdrawn ====
- Frederick Mayock, independent candidate for Massachusetts' 1st congressional district in 2020

== General election ==
The general election took place on November 3, 2020.

=== Debate ===
2020 United States Senate election in Massachusetts debate
No.	Date	Host	Moderator	Link	Democratic	Republican
Key: P Participant A Absent N Not invited I Invited W Withdrawn						
Key: P Participant A Absent N Not invited I Invited W Withdrawn					Ed Markey	Kevin O'Connor
1	October 5, 2020	WGBH-TV	Jim Braude; Margery Eagan		P	P

=== Predictions ===
Source	Ranking	As of
The Cook Political Report	Safe D	October 29, 2020
Inside Elections	Safe D	October 28, 2020
Sabato's Crystal Ball	Safe D	November 2, 2020
Daily Kos	Safe D	October 30, 2020
Politico	Safe D	November 2, 2020
RCP	Safe D	October 23, 2020
DDHQ	Safe D	November 3, 2020
538	Safe D	November 2, 2020
Economist	Safe D	November 2, 2020

=== Endorsements ===
Ed Markey (D)

U.S. representatives

- Joe Kennedy III, U.S. representative (MA-04)

Local officials

- Brian Arrigo, mayor of Revere
- Ricardo Arroyo, Boston city councilor
- Tom Bernard, mayor of North Adams
- James Fiorentini, mayor of Haverhill
- Scott Galvin, mayor of Woburn
- Donna Holaday, mayor of Newburyport
- Nicole LaChapelle, mayor of Easthampton
- Breanna Lungo-Koehn, mayor of Medford
- David Narkewicz, mayor of Northampton
- Dan Rivera, mayor of Lawrence
- William Sapelli, mayor of Agawam
- Robert Sullivan, mayor of Brockton
- Linda Tyer, mayor of Pittsfield
- John Vieau, mayor of Chicopee
- Roxann Wedegartner, mayor of Greenfield

Individuals

- Anne Cellucci Adams, daughter of former governor Paul Cellucci
- Steve Pemberton, chief human resources officer of Workhuman and former candidate for U.S. Senate

Unions

- SEIU 888

Organizations

- Coalition for Social Justice
- Demand Universal Healthcare
- Everytown for Gun Safety
- Foreign Policy for America
- Future Generations
- Humane Society of the United States Legislative Fund
- Make Room
- Progressive Massachusetts
- Shutesbury Democratic Town Committee

Newspapers

- Chelsea Record
- Dorchester Reporter
- Everett Leader Herald
- The Rainbow Times
Kevin O'Connor (R)

Statewide politicians

- Charlie Baker, 72nd governor of Massachusetts (2015–2023)

=== Polling ===
Poll source	Date(s) administered	Sample size	Margin of error	Ed Markey (D)	Kevin O'Connor (R)	Other	Undecided
MassInc	October 23–30, 2020	929 (LV)	–	60%	29%	6% (Note: "Some other candidate" with 3%; "Refused" with 2%; would not vote with 1%)	5%
YouGov/UMass Amherst	October 14–21, 2020	713 (LV)	–	65%	26%	2% (Note: "Other" with 2%; would not vote with 0%)	7%
Remington Research (R) (Note: Poll conducted for the O'Connor campaign.)	September 16–17, 2020	907 (LV)	± 3.3%	50%	40%	–	10%

Hypothetical polling

with Charlie Baker

Poll source	Date(s) administered	Sample size	Margin of error	Ed Markey (D)	Charlie Baker (R)	Undecided
Change Research	August 23–25, 2019	1,008 (RV)	± 3.1%	44%	45%	–

Poll source	Date(s) administered	Sample size	Margin of error	Shannon Liss-Riordan (D)	Charlie Baker (R)	Undecided
Change Research	August 23–25, 2019	1,008 (RV)	± 3.1%	35%	54%	–

Poll source	Date(s) administered	Sample size	Margin of error	Joe Kennedy III (D)	Charlie Baker (R)	Undecided
Change Research	August 23–25, 2019	1,008 (RV)	± 3.1%	49%	41%	–

Poll source	Date(s) administered	Sample size	Margin of error	Steve Pemberton (D)	Charlie Baker (R)	Undecided
Change Research	August 23–25, 2019	1,008 (RV)	± 3.1%	31%	56%	–

=== Results ===

United States Senate election in Massachusetts, 2020
Party	Candidate	Votes	%	±%
Democratic	Ed Markey (incumbent)	2,357,809	66.15%	+4.28%
Republican	Kevin O'Connor	1,177,765	33.05%	−4.93%
Independent	Shiva Ayyadurai (write-in)	21,134	0.59%	N/A
Write-in		7,428	0.21%	+0.06%
Total votes		3,564,136	100.0%	
Democratic hold				

==== By county ====
Markey won all 14 of Massachusetts' counties for the second election in a row.

By county

County	Ed Markey Democratic		Kevin O'Connor Republican		Shiva Ayyadurai Independent		Write-in		Margin		Total votes
County	#	%	#	%	#	%	#	%	#	%	Total votes
Barnstable	89,977	60.50	57,965	38.97	656	0.44	134	0.09	32,012	21.52	148,732
Berkshire	51,261	73.74	17,697	25.46	488	0.70	66	0.09	33,564	48.28	69,512
Bristol	155,927	57.35	113,750	41.84	1,418	0.52	801	0.29	42,177	15.51	271,896
Dukes	9,767	77.32	2,799	22.16	60	0.47	6	0.05	6,968	55.16	12,632
Essex	267,678	64.58	143,447	34.61	2,451	0.59	909	0.22	124,231	29.97	414,485
Franklin	29,900	71.49	11,241	26.88	570	1.36	114	0.27	18,659	44.61	41,825
Hampden	123,867	58.30	85,790	40.38	2,205	1.04	600	0.28	38,077	17.92	212,462
Hampshire	63,151	72.94	22,577	26.08	697	0.80	155	0.18	40,574	46.86	86,580
Middlesex	611,485	71.97	232,739	27.39	3,916	0.46	1,437	0.17	378,746	44.58	849,577
Nantucket	5,132	71.34	2,034	28.27	0	0.00	28	0.39	3,098	43.06	7,194
Norfolk	265,210	66.19	133,047	33.21	1,386	0.35	1,028	0.26	132,163	32.98	400,671
Plymouth	170,532	57.47	124,084	41.82	1,684	0.57	425	0.14	46,448	15.65	296,725
Suffolk	266,117	81.47	58,982	18.06	612	0.19	949	0.29	207,135	63.41	326,660
Worcester	247,805	58.28	171,613	40.36	4,991	1.17	776	0.18	76,192	17.92	425,185
Totals	2,357,809	66.15	1,177,765	33.04	21,134	0.59	7,428	0.21	1,180,044	33.11	3,564,136

==== By congressional district ====
Markey won all nine congressional districts.

District	Markey	O’Connor	Representative
1st	62%	37%	Richard Neal
2nd	62%	36%	Jim McGovern
3rd	64%	35%	Lori Trahan
4th	64%	36%	Joe Kennedy III
4th	64%	36%	Jake Auchincloss
5th	75%	25%	Katherine Clark
6th	63%	36%	Seth Moulton
7th	86%	13%	Ayanna Pressley
8th	66%	34%	Stephen Lynch
9th	58%	41%	Bill Keating

== See also ==
- 2020 Massachusetts general election

== Notes ==
General

Partisan clients
