= Charles River Broadcasting Company =

Former American radio broadcast company

Charles River Broadcasting Company was the owner of classical music stations, a classic rock station, a CNN Headline News affiliate, and a syndicated classical music program service, serving communities in Massachusetts and Rhode Island.

== History ==
The company began in 1948 when AM radio station WCRB, licensed to Waltham, Massachusetts, signed on, operating on the frequency 1330 kHz. Its principals were Richard C. O'Hare, Managing Director; Deuel Richardson, General Manager and Program Director; and L.P. Liles, Commercial Manager. Harold P. Richardson was the Promotions Manager. Lawrence A. Reilly was Chief Engineer.

The following year, Theodore Jones was hired as Executive Manager. In 1952, he and Stephen Paine acquired controlling ownership of the company from O'Hare and Deuel.

In 1954, Charles River Broadcasting added WCRB-FM, 102.5 MHz. In the mid 1970s, WCRB's programming was removed from the 1330 AM signal, which was relaunched as WHET, with a big-band/adult standards format. (WHET was sold in 1978 and is now WRCA, licensed to Watertown, Massachusetts.) In 1964 the company acquired WCRQ(FM), Providence, Rhode Island, which it sold in 1968.

By the early 1990s, Charles River Broadcasting adopted a commitment for the station to continue running classical music until 2092. Later in the decade, the company purchased two Massachusetts stations: WFCC-FM, Chatham, and WKPE-FM Orleans (both on Cape Cod); and two Rhode Island stations: WCRI-FM, Block Island/Westerly (formerly WVBI), and WCNX, Hope Valley (formerly WJJF). In February 1998, the company founded the World Classical Network, a syndicated classical music program service.

The company explored a sale possibility for its stations (effectively interpreting the commitment as a request and not an order). The company announced in December 2005 that WCRB would be sold to Greater Media, and announced in January 2006 that WCRI/WCNX would be sold to Judson Group, headed by Theodore Jones's son Christopher Jones

Theodore Jones was a minister in the Waltham Unitarian Universalist Church, one of the few Unitarians to own a broadcasting property in the U.S.

The WCRB deal with Greater Media closed on July 31, 2006. Greater Media subsequently announced that it would sell the physical property of WKLB-FM and the intellectual property of WCRB to Nassau Broadcasting, retaining WCRB's more powerful Boston signal. That deal was consummated on December 1, 2006 at noon, when WKLB's country music format moved to 102.5 FM, and WCRB's classical music format moved to 99.5 FM.

In April 2007, the remnants of Charles River Broadcasting (at the time doing business as CRB Media) were WFCC and WKPE (now WOCN-FM) as well as the World Classical Network. The broadcast properties were sold to Sandab Communications (doing business as Cape Cod Broadcasting), operators of longtime Cape Cod radio station leader WQRC.

== Stations formerly owned by the company ==
- WCRB 102.5 FM Waltham/Boston, Massachusetts (flagship) (sold to Greater Media, now owned by WGBH Educational Foundation)
- WCRQ 101.5 FM Providence, Rhode Island (now owned by Clear Channel Communications)
- WCRX 102.1 FM Springfield, Massachusetts (now owned by Saga Communications)
- WCRI 95.9 FM Block Island/Westerly, Rhode Island (sold to Judson Group, owned by Christopher Jones)
- WCNX 1180 AM Hope Valley, Rhode Island (CNN Headline News simulcast, not classical) (sold to Judson Group; resold to Red Wolf Broadcasting Corporation in 2014)
- WFCC-FM 107.5 Chatham, Massachusetts/Cape Cod (sold to Cape Cod Broadcasting)
- WKPE-FM 104.7 Orleans, Massachusetts/Cape Cod (Classic Rock, not classical) (sold to Cape Cod Broadcasting)
- World Classical Network (satellite service) (sold to Cape Cod Broadcasting)
