= WROR-FM =

Classic hits radio station in Framingham–Boston, Massachusetts

- Framingham, Massachusetts; United States
- Broadcast area: Greater Boston
- Frequency: 105.7 MHz (HD Radio)
- Branding: 105.7 WROR

Programming
- Format: Classic hits

Ownership
- Owner: Beasley Broadcast Group; (Beasley Media Group Licenses, LLC)
- Sister stations: WBOS; WBQT; WBZ-FM; WKLB-FM; WRCA

History
- First air date: February 10, 1960
- Former call signs: WKOX-FM (1960–1971); WVBF (1971–1993); WCLB-FM (1993–1995); WKLB-FM (1995–1996)
- Call sign meaning: Previously used on the former WROR (98.5 FM) in Boston, now WBZ-FM

Technical information
- Licensing authority: FCC
- Facility ID: 20438
- Class: B
- ERP: 23,000 watts
- HAAT: 224 meters (735 ft)
- Transmitter coordinates: 42°20′50.4″N 71°4′57.2″W

Links
- Public license information: Public file; LMS
- Webcast: Listen live; Listen live (via TuneIn)
- Website: wror.com

WROR-FM (105.7 FM) – branded as 105.7 WROR – is a commercial classic hits radio station licensed to Framingham, Massachusetts. Owned by the Beasley Broadcast Group, the station serves Greater Boston and much of surrounding New England, including portions of the Portsmouth and Providence radio markets. The WROR studios are located in the Boston suburb of Waltham, while the station's transmitter is located at the Prudential Tower in Downtown Boston.

The station has an emphasis on 1980s music, along with hit songs from the 1970s, and some 1990s and 2000s hits.

== History ==
=== WKOX-FM (1960–1971) ===
The station signed on as WKOX-FM on February 10, 1960, the FM companion of WKOX (1190 AM). Initially a simulcast of WKOX's daytime programming, WKOX-FM exclusively aired classical music programming at night, oriented towards Boston's MetroWest suburbs.

In January 1969, the station began broadcasting a top 40/album rock format as The New FM 105, and then later as FM Stereo 105. WKOX-FM was the Boston area's first FM top 40 station featuring live disc jockeys, including hosts Bill Thomas, Brother Bill Heizer, FM Douglas, program director Dick Stevens, John Leisher, Al Fraser, J. William Charles, with Ken McKay and Jim Conlee. WKOX-FM converted to stereo broadcasting that July.

=== WVBF (1971–1993) ===
WKOX and WKOX-FM were acquired by Fairbanks Communications in July 1971. After the sale, WKOX-FM became WVBF (also known as the Electronic Mama), as a hybrid top 40/rock station, initially retaining some of the WKOX-FM personalities. The call letters officially stood for "Welcome, Virginia Brown Fairbanks", the wife of station owner Richard M. Fairbanks; Richard also had a station named after himself, WRMF in West Palm Beach. WVBF improved its signal coverage, targeting the Greater Boston area. Some hosts added to WVBF during their early months included Bud Ballou, John "Big John" Gillis, Bill "BLF Bash" Freeman and Charlie Kendall.

During Fairbanks ownership in the 1970s, WVBF evolved from being a high energy top 40/rock hybrid station in 1971–1972, to becoming a mainstream top 40 station by 1975, and eventually evolved into a hot adult contemporary format over the years. WVBF also had many different nicknames in that era, including WVBF FM 105, WVBF Stereo 105, F105 WVBF and The New WVBF Boston 105.

WVBF debuted a morning show in 1981 hosted by the team of Loren Owens and Wally Brine; eventually joined on-air by character actor/parody musician Tom Doyle, newscaster Lauren Beckham Falcone, traffic reporter Hank Morse and producer Brian "Lung Boy" Bell. Loren and Wally would continue to air on the station even with multiple ownership, format and call letter changes until 2019, despite Brine's retirement in 2016.

In the early 1990s, Delilah was a host on WVBF before she moved to Seattle and entered national syndication.

=== WCLB/WKLB (1993–1996) ===
On February 12, 1993, citing the growing popularity of country music, WVBF became WCLB, "The Country Club". The format change was made in an effort to throw off Greater Media from launching a country format on newly acquired WCDJ (96.9 FM); that station went forward with its format switch, becoming WBCS, anyway. Arbitron diary confusion with television station WCVB-TV (as "L" and "V" could read similar in handwriting) led to WCLB changing its call sign to WKLB in 1995.

In 1995, WKLB was sold to Evergreen Media, and was widely expected to become a talk station. However, a series of subsequent trades in 1996 placed WKLB under common ownership with WBCS via Greater Media.

On August 24, 1996, the intellectual property of WKLB "merged" with WBCS, with the newly merged country station using the 96.9 frequency of WBCS along with the WKLB call letters, combining personalities from both stations. Some WKLB personalities remained at the station for the new format, including Loren and Wally. The two stations simulcast for eleven days.

=== WROR (1996–present) ===
After the simulcast ended, on September 5, 1996, Greater Media changed WKLB's call letters to WROR, and changed the station's format to oldies. The WROR callsign had previously been used on 98.5 FM until 1991, later being been "parked" first on WMFN (640 AM) in Zeeland, Michigan, then on WROR (1150 AM); the latter was also owned by Greater Media at the time.

The "new" WROR played 1970s pop and rock oldies, disco, some 1960s oldies, 1980s soft rock and top-40 crossovers, along with some classic rock, and hired several staffers connected to the "old" WROR. Leading broadcasters involved with WROR in the 1970s and early 1980s included program director Gary Berkowitz and personalities such as: Joe Martell, Phil Redo, Larry Justice, Frank Kingston Smith, and former WROR general manager Tom Baker.

By 1999, the format had been modified to classic rock, similar to co-owned WMGK in Philadelphia, but gradually moved back to more of a pop-based classic hits format in 2006, emphasizing pop adult rock hits while mixing in some R&B, disco, and harder rock songs. The station continues to emphasize the 1970s and 1980s, but also plays some well-known 1990s hits and two 1960s songs: Van Morrison's "Brown Eyed Girl" and Norman Greenbaum's "Spirit in the Sky" (although the latter was released as a single in the US in early 1970). WROR became the market's lone classic hits station in 2012 following WODS's format switch to top 40. The Lost 45s hosted by Barry Scott returned to WROR on September 2, 2012 (it had been on the station in 2001, before WODS picked up the program), before being dropped in April 2014.

On July 19, 2016, Beasley Media Group announced it would acquire Greater Media and its 21 stations (including WROR) for $240 million. The FCC approved the sale on October 6, 2016, and the sale closed on November 1, 2016. Following Beasley's acquisition of WBZ-FM in 2017, WROR-FM began broadcasting Boston Celtics games that conflict with broadcasts of the Boston Bruins or the New England Patriots; WBZ-FM is the flagship station for all three teams.

Tom Doyle was let go from the morning show on November 19, 2014; in December 2016, Wally Brine announced his retirement. Hank Morse was let go on June 24, 2019, four days before Owens retired, citing an inability to reach terms on a contract extension. Bob Bronson, formerly of WLTW in New York City and WZID in Manchester, was teamed up with Loren and Wally holdovers Lauren Beckham Falcone and Brian Bell.

In October 2022, Beasley Media made many staff cuts across the country, with WROR morning show producer Brian Bell and midday host Julie Devereaux being let go. Bell had been with the station since 1995; Devereaux had been with the station since 2000. Beasley also laid off WROR program director Ken West.

In May 2026, morning host Bob Bronson retired. He was replaced by Adam12, who joined Falcone on the morning show.

=== Christmas music ===
From 2007 through 2011, WROR would switch to an all Christmas music format throughout the holiday season; the station would also air a nightly call-in program for children hosted by "Santa Claus". After WODS's 2012 format switch, then-sister station WMJX assumed the role of playing Christmas music annually.

== Loren and Wally ==
The station may be best known for its former morning team, Loren Owens and Wally Brine, co-starring Tom Doyle who contributed character voices and parody songs, along with Lauren Beckham Falcone reporting news and Hank Morse with traffic, and produced by Brian "Lung Boy" Bell. (Doyle was let go on November 19, 2014.) The program aired on the station since 1981 (when it was still WVBF).

In December 2016, Wally Brine announced his retirement. Hank Morse was let go on June 24, 2019, a few days before the show concluded. Owens did his final show on June 28, 2019, citing an inability to reach terms on a contract extension. Subsequently, on Friday, October 8, 2022, Brian Bell was laid off along with afternoon DJ/Host, Julie Devereaux, in a cost cutting measure by the parent company of WROR, Beasley Media.

The Loren & Wally Show had several segments:

=== Men from Maine ===
Men from Maine was a one- to two-minute comedy segment, opening with soap opera organ music and Loren stating something varying along the lines of, "Welcome to another thrilling episode of the exciting adventures of Men from Maine. As today's action packed drama begins...". Episodes typically revolve around the two main characters Lem (played by Tom) and Ephus (played by Wally), and other residents of Bangor, Maine, such as Ephus' wife Effie and son Ephus Junior, Doc Cider (after Dock Sider shoes) and Pastor Fazool (after pasta e fagioli). The same characters have been used in songs about Maine on the segment "Tom's Townie Tunes" (see below). The humor of the segment is at its root generic "redneck humor", but set in very rural, backwoods Maine as opposed to the American South. Episode themes can run all the way from industrial accidents handled in incompetent ways (many residents, including Lem and Ephus work in the local sawmill), to bestiality. In all cases, the humor comes from the stupidity of the characters, and their obliviousness to it. Every episode ends with the characters going "Ayuh!"

At least one listener has found the show offensive, as heard on the first Men from Maine CD (sold during the holiday season to raise money for charity). Offended by the humor poking fun at her home state, a woman called the station, threatening to continue protesting the show until it is taken off the air. But the segment continued on the Loren and Wally show until Owens' departure from the program. Some can still be found as a "Loren & Wally Podcast of the Day" on iTunes and 2 episodes are posted on YouTube.

=== Tom's Townie Tunes ===
Tom's Townie Tunes is a segment created by morning crew member Tom Doyle that spoofs classic rock hits, using humorous lyrics to poke fun at towns in Massachusetts (and an additional few songs about the surrounding region, such as Maine). Often the songs are about high crime rates, poverty, and the general misery of residents in low class areas, while other songs satirize Harvard graduates and Kerry Healey's failed run for Governor of Massachusetts (sung to the tune of "867-5309 (Jenny)" by Tommy Tutone). The first ever Townie Tune was about Provincetown, Massachusetts (sung to the tune of Funkytown). Doyle's sports-related songs have occasionally gained airplay on other stations during championship seasons. During the holiday season, Tom often sings parodies of classic Christmas songs.

Other Townie Tunes include:

Townie Tune	Song parodied
"Stuck With a Kid at B.U."	"Stuck in the Middle With You" by Stealers Wheel
"Wasting My Life Away Up Here in Haverhill"	"Margaritaville" by Jimmy Buffett
"Fung Wah Bus"	"Magic Bus" by The Who
"F-You Babe"	"I Got You, Babe" by Sonny & Cher
"Somerville Song"	"Summertime, Summertime"
"Buying A Sheep Tonight" (Men From Maine song Posted on YouTube)	"The Lion Sleeps Tonight" by The Tokens
"Brady Shuffle"	"The Curly Shuffle" by Jump 'N The Saddle Band
"Big Dig"	"Big Shot" by Billy Joel
"I Heard You Came From Brookline"	"I Heard It Through the Grapevine"
"You Ain't Seen Newton Yet"	"You Ain't Seen Nothing Yet" by Bachman–Turner Overdrive
"The Rectum of Edmund Fitzgerald"	"The Wreck of the Edmund Fitzgerald" by Gordon Lightfoot
"Come To Medford"	"Come Together" by The Beatles
"Haverhill"	"Margaritaville" by Jimmy Buffett
"Naked Bare in Ipswich"	"Takin' Care of Business" by Bachman–Turner Overdrive
"Weymouth"	"Tequila" by The Champs
"Curt's So Good"	"Hurts So Good" by John Cougar Mellencamp
"Don't Worry, Big Papi"	"Don't Worry, Be Happy" by Bobby McFerrin
"Fifty Ways To Kill A Plover"	"50 Ways to Leave Your Lover" by Paul Simon
"In Maine" (Men From Maine song)	"Cocaine" by Eric Clapton
"Livin' in Revere"	"Reelin' in the Years" by Steely Dan
"The Most Miserable Time of the Year"	"The Most Wonderful Time of the Year" (Christmas song)
"Golden Banana" (a strip club on U.S. Route 1 in Peabody)	"Copacabana" by Barry Manilow
"Alone Again, Natalie"	"Alone Again (Naturally)" by Gilbert O'Sullivan
"Turkey for Thanksgiving"	"Workin' for a Livin'" by Huey Lewis and the News
"Free Turkey Weekend" (used as a promotion to win a free Butterball turkey for Thanksgiving)	"Free Bird" by Lynyrd Skynyrd
"Escape to The Cape"	"Escape (The Piña Colada Song)" by Rupert Holmes
"Leased Cadillac" (in honor of Gov. Patrick's official car)	"Pink Cadillac" by Bruce Springsteen
"Red, Red Tide"	"Red Red Wine" by UB40
"Malden Eyes"	"Lyin' Eyes" by The Eagles
"Rehabber's Delight"	"Rapper's Delight" by The Sugarhill Gang
"The Sex Change Song"	"Stand by Your Man" by Tammy Wynette
"Barry Bonds"	"Charlie Brown" by the Coasters
"Nomar's Number 5" (later rewritten as "No More Number 5")	"Mambo No. 5" by Lou Bega
"Terry's Got a Brand New Team"	"Papa's Got a Brand New Bag" by James Brown
"Sanjaya"	"Elvira" by The Oak Ridge Boys
"All I Wanna Do (Is Wipe My Bum)"	"All I Wanna Do" by Sheryl Crow
"Okajima!"	"Oklahoma!" by Rodgers and Hammerstein
"Matsuzaka"	"Macarena" by Los del Río
"Garbage Man"	"Piano Man" by Billy Joel
"The Panty Song"	"Shanty" by Jonathan Edwards
"Groin Fatigue"	"Centerfield" by John Fogerty
"I Want a Girl Like Lindsay Lohan"	"Slow Hand" by the Pointer Sisters
"Casino Song"	"Do You Want to Know a Secret" by The Beatles
"Donald the Coroner"	"Down on the Corner" by Creedence Clearwater Revival
"The Norwood Song"	"I'm Into Something Good" by Herman's Hermits
"Spin The Wheel of Meat" (promotional song for "Wheel of Meat" giveaway)	"Lights" by Journey "We Are Family" by Sister Sledge "I Just Want to Celebrate" by Rare Earth "Shining Star" by Earth, Wind & Fire "Don't Bring Me Down" by Electric Light Orchestra
"You're Still Juan Damón To Me"	"It's Still Rock and Roll to Me" by Billy Joel
"Johnny Damon"	"Johnny Angel" by Shelley Fabares
"Stupid Cheat"	"Super Freak" by Rick James
"These Boots Were Made in Brockton"	"These Boots Are Made for Walkin'" by Nancy Sinatra
"The Angels Song"	"Hotel California" by the Eagles
"Foxboro"	"Kokomo" by the Beach Boys
"Very Key People"	"Indian Reservation" by Paul Revere & the Raiders
"Try A Sausage On The Mild Side"	"Walk on the Wild Side" by Lou Reed
"You're 16-0" (later "17 and 0" and "18 and 0")	"You're Sixteen" by Ringo Starr
"It's Time To Beat the Giants"	"She Blinded Me With Science" by Thomas Dolby
"Addicted to Porn"	"Addicted to Love" by Robert Palmer
"Beat L.A."	"Walk This Way" by Aerosmith
"Manny Song"	"Brandy (You're a Fine Girl)" by Looking Glass
"The 401(k) Song"	"Play That Funky Music" by Wild Cherry
"Hazel Mae"	"Maggie May" by Rod Stewart
"Pat's Life"	"That's Life" by Frank Sinatra
"You Don't Mess Around With Lynn"	"You Don't Mess Around With Jim" by Jim Croce
"Bourne Bridge"	"The Unicorn" by the Irish Rovers
"North Shore People"	"Short People" by Randy Newman
"Everybody Plays the Pool"	"Everybody Plays the Fool" by The Main Ingredient
"I'm So Indicted"	"I'm So Excited" by The Pointer Sisters
"Batter Named Shin-Soo Choo (Japanese Baseball Song)"	"Chattanooga Choo-Choo"
"Chatham"	"Shattered" by the Rolling Stones
"Bring Whitey In"	"Mighty Quinn" by Manfred Mann
"Saugus Nights"	"Summer Nights" from Grease
"Dominic the Bookie" "Gostkowsi The Kicker"	"Dominick The Donkey" by Lou Monte
"Sue Cope Got Pulled Over by a Trooper"	"Grandma Got Run Over by a Reindeer" by Elmo and Patsy
"All My Harvard Friends Are Coming Over Tonight"	"All My Rowdy Friends Are Coming Over Tonight" by Hank Williams Jr.
"T Breakdown"	"Breakdown" by Tom Petty
"Lovely Humarock"	"Loves Me Like A Rock" by Paul Simon
"Wonderland"	"Winter Wonderland"
"The Pothole Song"	"On The Road Again" by Willie Nelson
"The Natick Collection"	"Rainbow Connection" by Kermit the Frog
"Lowell Man"	"Soul Man" by Sam & Dave
"He's Kim Jong-un"	"Undun" by the Guess Who
"We Got the Beards" (during the 2013 ALDS, ALCS, and World Series)	"We Got the Beat" by The Go-Go's
"We're Market Basket"	"We are the Champions" by Queen
"Stop the Steelers"	"Rock the Casbah" by The Clash
