= WKLB-FM =

Country music radio station in Waltham, Massachusetts

- Waltham, Massachusetts; United States
- Broadcast area: Greater Boston
- Frequency: 102.5 MHz (HD Radio)
- Branding: Country 102-5

Programming
- Format: Country
- Subchannels: HD2: Country "NuTune Country"
- Affiliations: Westwood One

Ownership
- Owner: Beasley Broadcast Group; (Beasley Media Group Licenses, LLC)
- Sister stations: WBOS; WBQT; WBZ-FM; WRCA; WROR-FM

History
- First air date: 1954 (as WCRB-FM)
- Former call signs: WCRB-FM (1954–1975); WCRB (1975–2006)
- Call sign meaning: "The Country Club"; original slogan for the former WKLB-FM 105.7, now WROR-FM

Technical information
- Licensing authority: FCC
- Facility ID: 10542
- Class: B
- ERP: 14,000 watts
- HAAT: 276 meters (906 ft)
- Transmitter coordinates: 42.310°N 71.237°W

Links
- Public license information: Public file; LMS
- Webcast: Listen live; Listen live (via TuneIn)
- Website: country1025.com

WKLB-FM (102.5 MHz, "Country 102-5") is a country radio station licensed to Waltham, Massachusetts, and serving Greater Boston. WKLB's studios are located in Waltham. The transmitter is located in Needham, on a tower shared with WBUR-FM and several TV stations serving Boston and beyond. The station serves as an overflow for the Boston Bruins radio network.

== Past WKLB frequencies ==
Prior to its current location, the WKLB calls and format were located on 99.5, 96.9, and 105.7. 99.5 started out in 1947 as WLLH-FM, the FM counterpart to WLLH, programming a full-service format to the Merrimack Valley.

During the 1970s, 99.5 became WSSH (for "Wish 99.5"), which programmed a format of chiefly soft instrumental renditions of pop tunes with a few vocalists an hour, consisting of soft AC and standards cuts. In 1982, WSSH evolved to a soft AC format, gradually eliminating the instrumental renditions and became home to popular nighttime radio personality Delilah Rene (before she became nationally syndicated). Ratings were very high through the '80s and WSSH often led other AC stations. By then, the station was separated from WLLH, but it later gained a sister station on 1510 (now WMEX).

However, in the early 1990s, ratings went from excellent to mediocre; part of the reason was the perception that WSSH was still an elevator music station. During this time period, the station modified their soft AC format by 1991, adding current product and some up tempo AC tunes, evolving to a mainstream AC format. WSSH became the third place adult contemporary radio station, below WMJX and WVBF. On December 13, 1995, the owner of WSSH, Granum Communications, changed the format to smooth jazz, under the branding of WOAZ ("99.5 The Oasis"), mirroring Granum's KOAI in Dallas.

Meanwhile, 96.9 was a beautiful music station under the WJIB call sign, and later a smooth jazz station as WCDJ (which began in 1990). In 1993, Greater Media purchased this station and converted it to country under the WBCS call sign; however, in February of that year, 105.7 had dropped the AC format and WVBF calls to become another country station, WCLB, shortly beforehand, effectively giving Boston two country stations. Confusion with other radio stations, including WCRB, and a TV station lead to WCLB changing its calls to WKLB-FM in 1995. 105.7 was sold by then-owners Evergreen Media in early 1996 to Greater Media, who combined the two country stations on 96.9 under the WKLB call sign. (105.7 became WROR-FM at that time).

Then, in 1997, CBS (which had just merged with Infinity Broadcasting, which itself had purchased Granum) sold WOAZ and WBOS (along with WMMR in Philadelphia) to Greater Media in exchange for KLSX in Los Angeles. On August 22, 1997, Greater Media swapped WOAZ and WKLB's formats in a move where the format and personalities of WOAZ moved to 96.9 (but adopting the call sign WSJZ, the station is now WBQT), while WKLB moved to 99.5, where it stayed until December 1, 2006. Greater Media noted that the move was made as the 99.5 signal is stronger than 96.9 in Essex County, home to many country music listeners.

In early 2006, WKLB launched its HD2 digital sidechannel with a classic country format, playing country music from the 1960s through the '90s, with core artists including Johnny Cash, Waylon Jennings, Willie Nelson, Loretta Lynn, Reba McEntire and others.

In November 2006, the 99.5 frequency was spun off to Nassau Broadcasting Partners as a consequence of a deal where Greater Media acquired WCRB's frequency, with 102.5 adopting the WKLB format and call sign, and Nassau acquiring WCRB's call letters and programming. Nassau already owned WBACH, a network of four classical-formatted stations in Maine affiliated with WCRB's satellite-delivered World Classical Network service. The two stations switched frequencies at Noon on December 1, 2006. The final song on "99.5 WKLB" was the United States National Anthem sung by Ricochet, while the first song played by "102.5 WKLB" was "Life Is A Highway" by Rascal Flatts.

Logo for WKLB's HD2 subchannel, branded "The Wolf"

For nearly 20 years, WKLB broadcast "Sunday Morning Country Oldies", hosted by Michael Burns and Stu Fink. The show was abruptly canceled on June 23, 2014, after iHeartMedia's WEDX switched to country as WBWL and began a direct challenge to WKLB, including promos deriding it as 'your parent's (country station)' to court young listeners. WKLB quickly responded by adding newer songs to their playlist and reducing spins of older music. A similar program hosted by Burns and Fink, "Boston Country Oldies", now airs on WCAP, WWSF, and WCRN.

On July 19, 2016, Beasley Media Group announced it would acquire Greater Media and its 21 stations (including WKLB) for $240 million. The FCC approved the sale on October 6, 2016, and the sale closed on November 1, 2016.

On May 26, 2017, WKLB-FM dropped the "Country" branding, and rebranded as "The New 102.5"; with the rebranding, the station also changed its logo and slogan from "Boston's #1 for New Hit Country" to "Boston's Hottest Country". The station returned to the "Country 102.5" branding a few days later, but kept the "Boston's Hottest Country" slogan.

On August 2, 2024, Carolyn Kruse announced her retirement after 31 years of hosting on Boston's country stations. Later that month, the station fired its local morning show and began airing The Andie Summers Show from sister station WXTU in Philadelphia.

== History of the 102.5 license ==
The 102.5 license started in 1954 as WCRB-FM, the FM sister station of WCRB (AM) (now WRCA), bringing its classical music format to parts of the Boston area which did not get good reception of WCRB (AM)'s directional signal as well as improved audio quality. In 1961, WCRB-FM was the first Boston-area FM station to broadcast in multiplex stereo; for a few years prior to that, WCRB had broadcast some of its programming in stereo by broadcasting one channel on AM, the other on FM. Although Charles River Broadcasting acquired other radio stations in the last 10 years, WCRB remained the company's flagship station.

In 1975, WCRB ended simulcasting of WCRB-FM, changing call letters to WHET, and its format to big-band/adult standards. In 1978, Charles River sold off WHET, but retained WCRB, which became increasingly successful over the years as a 24/7 classical music station.

WCRB was under a long-term commitment by Charles River Broadcasting to continue to air classical music for the foreseeable future, and it carries no non-classical music programs. However, the decision to interpret the commitment as a request rather than a demand resulted in the announced sale of the station to Greater Media on December 19, 2005. However, as Greater Media already owned five FM stations in the Boston market - the maximum allowed - one of Greater Media's Boston stations would have to be sold before the company could acquire WCRB. The station that was sold was the 99.5 frequency, which was sold to Nassau Broadcasting, who also purchased WCRB's intellectual property. WCRB's transition from 102.5 to 99.5 was completed on December 1, 2006, at noon local time. The first selection broadcast on the new frequency was the Hallelujah Chorus from Handel's Messiah. All of the WCRB announcers including Laura Carlo, Don Spencer, Ray Brown, Mark Calder and Dave MacNeill were expected to stay on with the station. Programs including Kid's Classical Hour and the live Boston Symphony Orchestra broadcasts were also expected to continue.
