= WRCA =

Radio station in Watertown, Massachusetts

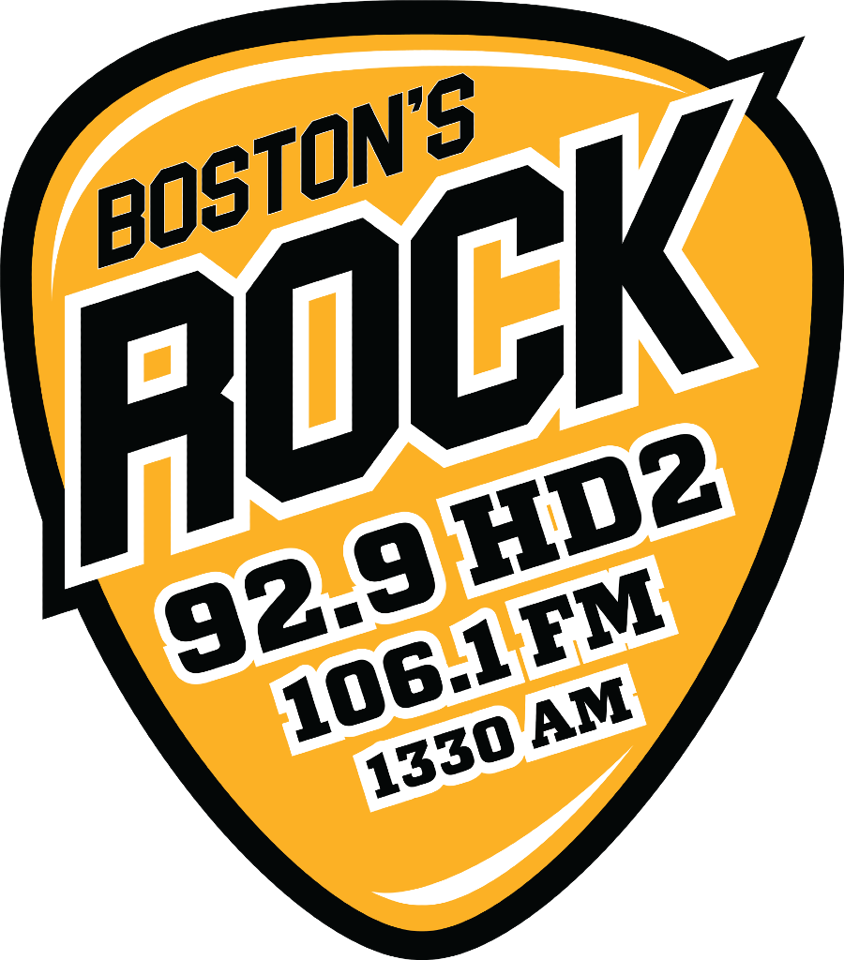
- Watertown, Massachusetts; United States
- Broadcast area: Greater Boston
- Frequency: 1330 kHz
- Branding: Rock 92.9 HD2

Programming
- Format: Mainstream rock

Ownership
- Owner: Beasley Broadcast Group, Inc.; (Beasley Media Group Licenses, LLC)
- Sister stations: WBOS; WBQT; WBZ-FM; WKLB-FM; WROR-FM

History
- First air date: January 30, 1948
- Former call signs: WCRB (1948–1975); WHET (1975–1979); WDLW (1979–1989)
- Call sign meaning: "Radio Comedy and the Arts" (previous format)

Technical information
- Licensing authority: FCC
- Facility ID: 60695
- Class: B
- Power: 25,000 watts (day); 17,000 watts (night)
- Transmitter coordinates: 42°17′20.35″N 71°11′19.2″W
- Translator: 106.1 W291CZ (Boston)
- Repeater: 92.9 WBOS-HD2 (Brookline)

Links
- Public license information: Public file; LMS
- Webcast: Listen live (via TuneIn)
- Website: rock929rocks.com

WRCA (1330 kHz) is a commercial AM radio station licensed to Watertown, Massachusetts, and serving the Greater Boston area. The license is held by the Beasley Media Group, LLC, part of the Beasley Broadcast Group, Inc. WRCA airs the mainstream rock format formerly carried on sister station WBOS.

WRCA transmits with 25,000 watts daytime, and 17,000 watts at night. It uses a directional antenna in order to protect other stations on 1330 AM, with a five-tower array off Saw Mill River Parkway in Newton, near the Charles River. WRCA's programming is also heard on FM translator W291CZ at 106.1 MHz in Boston. It is also broadcast on the HD2 digital subchannel of WBOS.

== History ==
The station began operating as WCRB on January 30, 1948, owned by Theodore Jones's Charles River Broadcasting (hence the WCRB call letters). WCRB was originally a community radio station for Waltham, Massachusetts, before switching to a classical music format a few years later. An FM simulcast was added in 1954, WCRB-FM. As FM broadcasting became more popular for music listening, the AM station ceased simulcasting WCRB-FM's classical format in 1975 and became WHET, programming a big band/adult standards format from 1975 until 1978, and then a short run as a beautiful music outlet. Sales of the station to various owners led to formats such as country music WDLW for most of the 1980s, and then "Showbiz Radio" WRCA (standing for "Radio, Comedy, and Arts") in 1990 before the station began leasing time to ethnic broadcasters in 1991 with the WRCA call sign retained. The current owners, the Beasley Broadcast Group, took over in 2000 from the ADD Radio Group.

Logo for the station prior to November 15, 2016

The station's long time transmitter site in Waltham was discontinued in 2007 when WRCA became one of three AM stations to share a rebuilt transmitter facility at the site of WUNR on Sawmill Brook Parkway in Newton. This site is now used by stations on 1200, 1330 and 1600 kHz.

First "Bloomberg 106.1" logo (July 2017-October 2022)

WRCA's city of license changed from Waltham to Watertown in 2007, and the power increased to 25,000 watts daytime, 17,000 watts nighttime. In addition to ethnic programming, WRCA broadcast Northeastern Huskies men's ice hockey games.

Following Beasley's acquisition of Greater Media, WRCA went silent on November 15, 2016, as it moved to new studios; it returned in May 2017 with a simulcast of "Boston's Irish Channel", the HD2 channel of sister station WBQT, as it was believed that WRCA was in the process of signal testing. The station was also paired with an FM translator, W291CZ (licensed to Boston) at 106.1 MHz.

Second "Bloomberg 106.1" logo (2022–2024)

On July 3, 2017, Bloomberg L.P. and Beasley announced that WRCA/W291CZ would begin carrying Bloomberg Radio programming (which moved over from WXKS) beginning the following day. Concurrently, the HD2 channel of WBOS began to simulcast WRCA's programming.

On August 20, 2024, Beasley announced that Bloomberg programming would move to WBOS's primary channel on September 3 at 12 p.m.; WRCA, W291CZ, and WBOS-HD2, in turn, inherited the "Rock 92.9" classic rock programming that had been airing on WBOS.

== Translator ==
Broadcast translator for WRCA
Call sign	Frequency	City of license	FID	ERP (W)	Class	Transmitter coordinates	FCC info
W291CZ	106.1 FM	Boston, Massachusetts	144592	96	D	42°20′57″N 71°4′29″W	LMS
