= WBQT =

WBQT may refer to:

- WBQT (FM), a radio station (96.9 FM) licensed to Boston, Massachusetts, United States
- WBQT (The CW Plus), a cable television channel in Springfield, Massachusetts, United States, part of The CW Plus
