= WKCC (FM) =

- Chatham, Massachusetts; United States
- Broadcast area: Hyannis, Massachusetts; Cape Cod
- Frequency: 107.5 MHz

Programming
- Format: Contemporary Christian music
- Network: K-Love

Ownership
- Owner: K-Love Inc.

History
- First air date: March 24, 1987
- Former call signs: WFCC-FM (1987–2026)
- Call sign meaning: K-Love Cape Cod

Technical information
- Licensing authority: FCC
- Facility ID: 17066
- Class: B
- ERP: 50,000 watts
- HAAT: 104 meters (341 ft)
- Transmitter coordinates: 41.737°N 70.011°W

Links
- Public license information: Public file; LMS
- Webcast: Listen live
- Website: www.klove.com

WKCC (107.5 MHz) is a radio station licensed to Chatham, Massachusetts, United States, broadcasting the K-Love contemporary Christian music network to Cape Cod. It broadcasts from a transmitter site in Brewster.

This station operated from 1987 to 2026 as WFCC-FM, a classical music station based in Cape Cod and founded by First Class Communications. Several Boston-area media personalities were on-air hosts for WFCC-FM. It was owned by Charles River Broadcasting from 1996 to 2007 and Cape Cod Broadcasting Media, owner of a cluster of local radio stations, from 2007–2026. Citing changing economic conditions and lower advertising revenue, the company sold the station to K-Love in 2026.

== History ==
Original WFCC logo, as shown on a drink cup.

The station started broadcasting on March 24, 1987, from state-of-the-art facilities on Route 28 in West Chatham. It was owned at the time by First Class Communications, run by Joseph A. Ryan and his family, who all worked at the station, including wife Pauline (receptionist), son Kevin (sales manager), and daughter Justine (sales). Joe Ryan, who worked at NBC as a writer for Today during Dave Garroway's tenure, then at WCVB-TV (channel 5) in Boston, hired WCVB personalities to be on his staff at WFCC-FM, including newsman Jack Hynes, meteorologists Bob Copeland (a Chatham resident) and Bill Hovey, and sportscaster Bill O'Connell, complemented by local classical announcers Janice Gray, Dick Eressy, Paul Jimerson, Paul Nossiter, Steve Murphy, Don Lawrence, Pierre Paquin, Don Merna, and Dick O'Connor. The station played mostly classical music on weekdays, with the afternoon drive show being big band, hosted by Lou Dumont. On the weekends, classical was complemented by the Metropolitan Opera radio broadcasts and other syndicated classical shows, as well as local specialty shows Jazz on the Half-Shell and Folk Roots and Branches with Paul Jimerson, and a program devoted to classical piano, Klavier, produced by Jimerson and hosted by his wife, pianist and teacher Melinda Isaacson.

The stock market crash of 1987 had a devastating effect on the Cape's economy, and WFCC-FM lost significant advertising revenue. As a result, stronger-rated classical music programming replaced the evening folk and jazz shows. Pierre Paquin, a well-known southern New England classical music recording engineer and broadcaster, was hired in 1989 to help bring up the ratings. His Sunday morning broadcasts earned the highest ratings for the station and his special programs garnished several Massachusetts Broadcasters Association awards, including the award for Best Station I.D., featuring his daughter, MaryAnne "Mim" L. Paquin. In fall of 1990, Mim was bought in as an apprentice to write and produce four, one hour-long programs written for a younger audience. Her production "Witches, Goblins, Jack-o-lanterns and Ghouls" won an honorable mention Massachusetts Broadcasters Association. Don Merna was also hired in 1989 to host weekdays as well as weekend evenings. Both Paquin and Merna broadcast for WFCC until 1995 and 1996 respectively and are still Cape Cod residents. In 1991, the station's offices and studios were moved to new facilities on Route 6A in Brewster. WFCC-FM was subsequently sold in 1992 to Dolphin Communications, owned by Allan Stanley. WFCC-FM was purchased by Charles River Broadcasting (then owners of Boston's WCRB) in 1996, with its studios and offices moving to a former bank building on Route 28 in West Yarmouth. WFCC-FM's programming became automated full-time as a result.

WFCC-FM has been the flagship station of the World Classical Network syndicated service (started by Charles River Broadcasting) since 1998. The station and the network were sold in 2007 to Sandab Communications (doing business as Cape Cod Broadcasting Media), owners of Cape Cod radio stations WQRC, WOCN-FM, and WKPE-FM), and now broadcast from studios and offices in Hyannis.

Former logo

Last logo as WFCC-FM

Original WFCC-FM staff member Steve Murphy returned to the station's airwaves as morning host on September 16, 2008, after an 18-year absence.

In April 2026, WFCC-FM was sold to Christian broadcaster K-Love Inc. pending Federal Communications Commission approval. Cape Cod Broadcasting Media owner Gregory Bone attributed the $362,000 sale to changing economic conditions that no longer made it practical to operate the station, as well as the overall lower advertising revenue for classical stations compared to other formats. The call sign was changed to WKCC on June 23, 2026, a day before K-Love Inc. closed on the sale.
