= Michael Castner =

Michael Castner is an American journalist, television host and radio personality. He is the morning national news anchor for NBC News Radio. He formerly hosted The Michael Castner Show on KEX in Portland and The Daily Wrap for the Wall Street Journal Radio Network. The Michael Castner Show debuted on KEX in July 2013 and was cancelled December 2016. The syndicated Daily Wrap show debuted in April 2011, and aired live from 6 to 9 pm Eastern Time. Charter affiliates include KEIB, Los Angeles, and KLIF, Dallas. Affiliates 96.9 WTKK-FM, Boston, WHNZ, Tampa, and KSTE, Sacramento, were added in the summer of 2011. Additional large market affiliates KVI, Seattle, KHOW, Denver (9 pm-midnight), KEX, Portland, and 92.3 KTAR-FM, Phoenix, were added in January 2012. The Daily Wrap was cancelled in spring 2013.

Previously Castner was co-host of a daily morning drive radio show on WRNO-FM in New Orleans, Louisiana. He also hosted an afternoon show on Newsradio 1150 WJBO Radio in Baton Rouge, LA. Both are iHeart stations. His first iHeart station was KFI in Los Angeles.

He also hosted The Nightside Project for Bonneville International which was heard each weeknight on KSL/Salt Lake City, KTAR/Phoenix, and WWWT/Washington. As host on Nightside, Castner took the time slot to number one from 12th place in 9 months. He was laid off from KSL as of November 7, 2007. At the time of his laying off, the show was scheduled to enter syndication nationwide.

Castner has a career span of nearly 30 years, having worked for KFI/Los Angeles, as well as hosting shows on the E! Network for 14 years. Castner also served as press advisor to congressional candidate Joseph P. Kennedy II, and as the communications consultant for the Utah State Senate. Castner was a Washington correspondent for Tribune Broadcasting covering the White House and State Department.

On March 3, 2016, Castner came out as gay live on air. He was replaced several months later.
