= WFCC =

WFCC may refer to:

- WKCC (FM), a Cape Cod, Massachusetts radio station, that broadcast as WFCC-FM from 1987 to 2026
- Women Film Critics Circle
- World Federation for Culture Collections
- World Forum Convention Center
- World Federation for Chess Composition
