= WBOS =

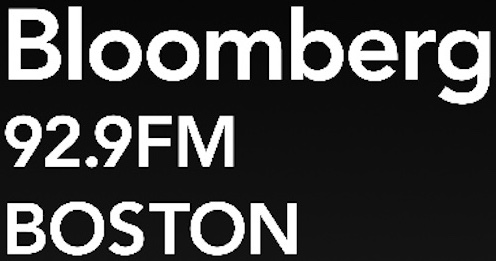
- Brookline, Massachusetts; United States
- Broadcast area: Greater Boston
- Frequency: 92.9 MHz (HD Radio)
- Branding: Bloomberg 92.9 Boston

Programming
- Language: English
- Format: Financial news
- Subchannels: HD2: Classic rock "Rock 92.9" (simulcast of WRCA)
- Network: Bloomberg Radio
- Affiliations: NBC News Radio

Ownership
- Owner: Beasley Broadcast Group; (Beasley Media Group Licenses, LLC)
- Operator: Bloomberg L.P.
- Sister stations: WBQT; WBZ-FM; WKLB-FM; WRCA; WROR-FM

History
- First air date: April 1, 1960
- Former call signs: WBOS-FM (1960–1969)
- Call sign meaning: Boston (also the IATA code for Logan International Airport)

Technical information
- Licensing authority: FCC
- Facility ID: 23439
- Class: B
- ERP: 18,500 watts
- HAAT: 224 meters (735 ft)
- Transmitter coordinates: 42°20′50.4″N 71°4′57.2″W
- Repeater: 1450 WNBP (Newburyport)

Links
- Public license information: Public file; LMS
- Webcast: Listen live (via TuneIn)
- Website: www.bloombergradio.com

WBOS (92.9 MHz, "Bloomberg 92.9") is a commercial FM radio station licensed to Brookline, Massachusetts, and serving Greater Boston. WBOS is owned by Beasley Broadcast Group, with studios and offices in Waltham. WBOS airs a financial news radio format from Bloomberg Radio.

WBOS has an effective radiated power (ERP) of 18,500 watts. The transmitter is on the top of the Prudential Tower in Boston's Back Bay neighborhood. WBOS broadcasts in the HD Radio hybrid format. The HD2 subchannel simulcasts WRCA, which carries the former classic rock format of WBOS.

== History ==
=== Early years ===
On April 1, 1960, WBOS-FM signed-on, simulcasting most of the programming of its sister station WBOS (1600 AM; now WUNR). WBOS-AM-FM were owned by the Champion Broadcasting System with studios at 790 Commonwealth Avenue.

Most of the AM station's programming was beautiful music, but when the AM side began to broadcast ethnic programming, the FM side continued to play beautiful music, which was branded on both AM and FM as "Boston's Music Theatre". In 1975, WBOS (Note: The "-FM" suffix had been dropped on March 24, 1969.) changed to a hodgepodge format which did not gain much of an audience.

=== Disco ===
In 1978, Boston radio personality Ron Robin, disappointed that the airtime for his weekly disco music show on WVBF had been cut back, left WVBF and began doing a four-hour Sunday-night disco show for WBOS. Initially, Robin bought the airtime and sold commercials for the show.

The success of that show led to WBOS hiring Robin, and a rapid expansion of the disco programming, first to seven nights a week from 8:00 p.m. to midnight (April 1978), and then to 24/7 in September 1978. For a brief time in late 1978 and early 1979, "Disco 93" WBOS was one of Boston's most popular radio stations. But when WXKS-FM came on the scene with a highly promoted disco format, including big promotions and hiring away some WBOS disc jockeys, WBOS' ratings suffered.

WRKO midday legend J.J. Wright (later at WODS) was one of the original disco DJs for WBOS when the station went round-the-clock disco in 1978. Longtime, popular producer Jack King (WBIM-FM, WVBF, and WBZ) created, wrote and engineered most of the station's disco specials at the time. King was there at the beginning of the station's format change to disco and worked closely with Robin to 'keep the beat going' into the late 1970s and early 1980s. When WBOS changed to adult contemporary music, the duo went to WBZ radio for a long, successful stint there.

=== Adult contemporary ===
In January 1980, the station flipped to an adult contemporary format which was a little less "adult" and a little more "contemporary", but that format would only run for two years.

=== Rock ===
In January 1982, WBOS flipped to a short-lived attempt at an album-oriented rock (AOR) format, programmed for some of that time by legendary Boston rock personalities Jerry Goodwin and Maxanne Satori. However, the rock format did not make any inroads against established rockers like WBCN, WCOZ, and WAAF.

=== Country ===
On July 14, 1983, WBOS' format was abruptly changed to country music, and was moderately successful for several years. It was the only FM country station in the Boston market at the time.

Program director and morning personality Dean James, along with general sales manager Dave DiGregorio, worked to bring country to the mainstream in Boston, a city with little history as a country music stronghold. The country format ran for six years.

=== Adult album alternative ===
On April 27, 1989, at 3:00 pm, WBOS dropped country and adopted an adult album alternative (AAA) format, initially with a bit more of an eclectic focus than most AAA stations at the time, incorporating classic rock, soul, R&B, and singer-songwriter cuts into the playlist, along with new releases. Eventually, the station gravitated more toward current material and new releases. At that time, when CDs were just starting to be used in radio, WBOS promoted itself as the first all-compact disc radio station, eliminating vinyl, and very sparingly using carts for some songs. Unusually, the vinyl themed retro show "The Lost 45s" with Barry Scott aired on Sunday nights after leaving WZLX.

In April 2005, WBOS made changes to play more music and decrease the amount of talk. The station's morning show, hosted by Bill Abbate and Kristin Lessard, was abruptly cancelled to make way for the DJ-free "All Music Mornings". "It's putting the station somewhat back to where it started in terms of its ideals. Listener perception is that radio plays too many commercials and that DJs can be boring and irrelevant," said Buzz Knight, operations manager for WBOS. Knight said that WBOS would be "the cool station for people over 30".

In September 2007, George Knight began hosting morning drive on the station, but that would be short lived. That same month, owner Greater Media registered domains that showed that the station was possibly flipping to sports talk as "92.9 The Ticket", complete with a logo and a slogan, "Boston's Only FM Sports Station". The station was rumored to flip on October 1 of that year, but never materialized. WBMX (now WBZ-FM) and WMKK (now WEEI-FM) eventually flipped to the sports format over the next five years.

=== Alternative rock ===
On February 1, 2008, at 5:00 pm, the station saw its biggest change since flipping to AAA in 1989, as the format switched to alternative rock and the station rebranded as "Radio 92-9". While George Knight continued to host his popular "Sunday Morning Over Easy" program, and music director Dana Marshall was promoted to program director, the rest of the station's airstaff was let go. After WBCN's demise in 2010, WBOS adopted a mainstream rock direction, but continued to report on Mediabase and Nielsen BDS on the alternative panel. This was due to the addition of bands like Def Leppard and Guns n Roses to the playlist. The move left WFNX once again as Boston's only pure alternative rock station. Around 2012, WBOS reverted to playing mostly alternative tracks, while playing some classic hard rock tracks (but at a very minimal amount), usually from artists/bands such as Led Zeppelin, Van Halen, Aerosmith, AC/DC, Metallica, Pink Floyd, Billy Idol, and Guns N' Roses. By July 2012, WBOS became Boston's only alternative rock station following the closure of WFNX.

On July 13, 2016, WBOS rebranded as "Alt 92-9". The station slowly added more air personalities back to the station during this time.

In July 2017, WBOS began carrying the Dave and Chuck The Freak morning show out of sister station WRIF. That same year, the station began broadcasting Boston Bruins hockey games that conflict with New England Patriots games, the arrangement followed Beasley's acquisition of WBZ-FM, the flagship station for both teams.

"Radio 92-9" logo used from February 1, 2008, to July 12, 2016

Logo as Alt 92-9 used from July 13, 2016 to April 10, 2019

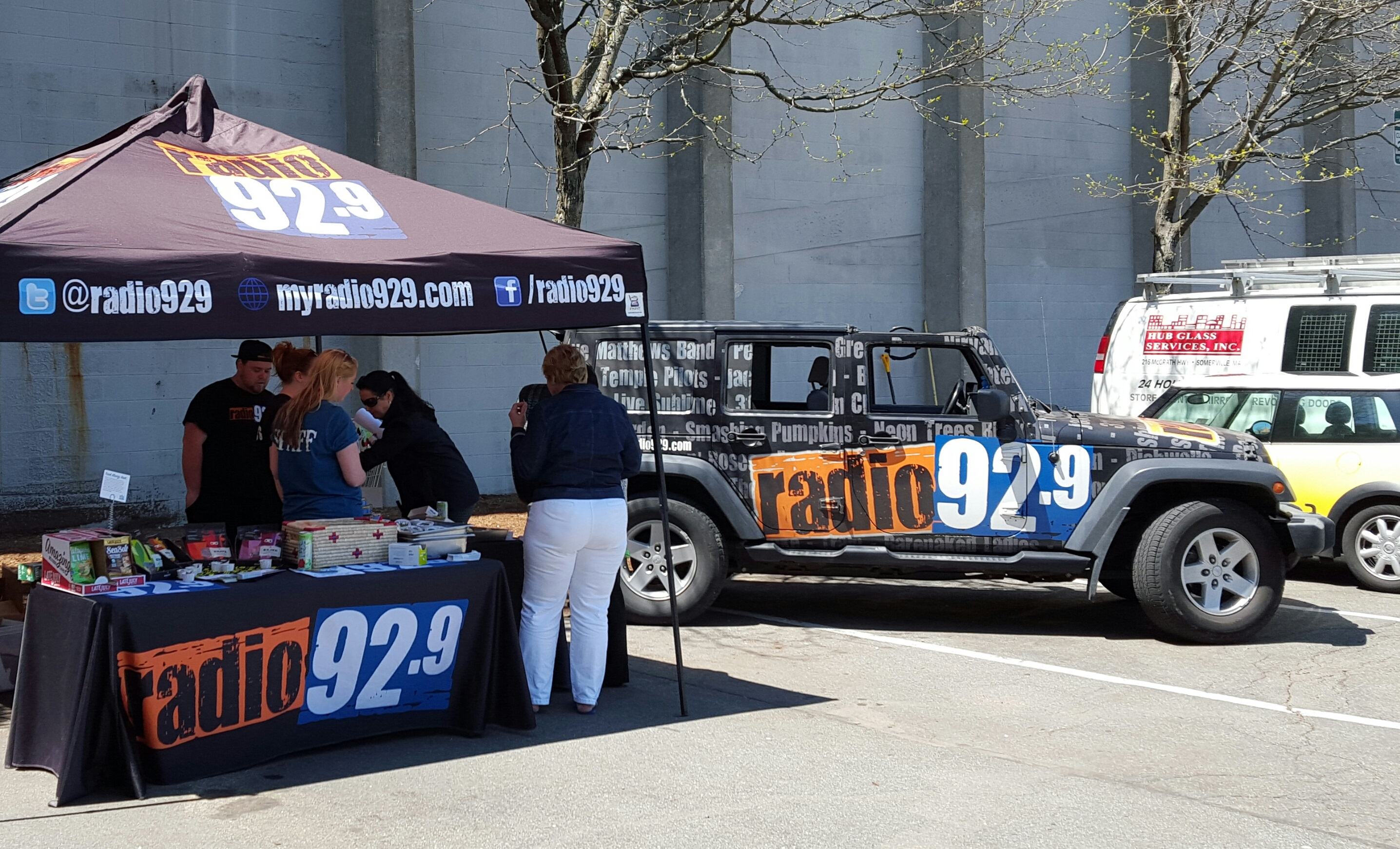
The Radio 92-9 street team in Cambridge, Massachusetts, sampling products from Whole Foods Market

=== Classic rock ===
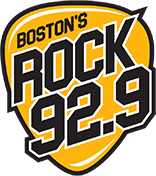
"Rock 92.9" logo, used from April 11, 2019, to September 3, 2024

On April 11, 2019, at 10:30 a.m., following the "Dave & Chuck the Freak Morning Show" (and after playing "Bury a Friend" by Billie Eilish), WBOS flipped to classic rock, branded as "Rock 92-9". The first song on "Rock" was "For Those About to Rock (We Salute You)" by AC/DC.

The change followed a transition from a classic rock-classic hits hybrid to a more conventional classic hits format at sister station WROR-FM, leaving space for a competitor to market powerhouse WZLX. The station brought back two DJs previously heard on WBCN during its later rock years: Adam 12 hosted middays, and Hardy hosted afternoons, voice-tracking his shift while retaining his primary duties co-hosting the Toucher & Hardy show on sister station WBZ-FM.

=== Bloomberg Radio ===
On August 20, 2024, Beasley Media Group announced that Bloomberg Radio would take over operations of WBOS by a local marketing agreement, effective September 3 at 12 p.m., with the station branding as "Bloomberg 92.9 Boston". The classic rock format and Dave and Chuck the Freak concurrently moved to WRCA and WBOS-HD2. No on-air talent would transfer, however; Hardy reverted to co-hosting the morning show on WBZ-FM, while Adam 12 would join that program as executive producer.

=== Owners ===
WBOS was originally owned by Boston businessman Herbert Hoffman. In the 1980s, he sold it to Sconnix, which later sold it to Ackerley Media in 1988. The station was sold to Granum Communications in 1992, which merged with Infinity Broadcasting in 1996. In 1997, the station was traded to Greater Media.

On July 19, 2016, Beasley Media Group announced it would acquire Greater Media and its 21 stations (including WBOS) for $240 million. The FCC approved the sale on October 6, 2016, and the sale closed on November 1, 2016.

== HD Radio ==
WBOS broadcasts using the iBiquity HD Radio digital broadcasting system, and had an HD secondary channel called "The Coffee House", which launched in early 2006. This format consisted of "the acoustic, unplugged side of triple A" by using the "station's archive of live and in-studio performances", and emphasized "singer-songwriters, folk music and unplugged versions of songs by core WBOS artists".

The "Coffee House" format was later replaced with Radio You Boston, featuring content programmed by college-aged residents of the Boston area. It was later re-branded as Local 92.9, and featured local music artists from the Boston area.

On July 3, 2017, Beasley announced that Bloomberg Radio programming would be moved from WXKS to sister WRCA, simulcast on a new FM translator W291CZ, and also carried on WBOS-HD2. Following the 2024 move of Bloomberg programming to WBOS's primary channel, WRCA and WBOS-HD2 inherited WBOS's classic rock programming.
