= WCRI-FM =

- Block Island, Rhode Island; United States
- Broadcast area: Newport, Rhode Island
- Frequency: 95.9 MHz
- Branding: Classical 95.9

Programming
- Format: Classical music
- Affiliations: World Classical Network

Ownership
- Owner: Judson Group, Inc.

History
- First air date: June 13, 1994
- Former call signs: WVBI (1994–1999); WCRI (1999–2011)
- Call sign meaning: "Classical Rhode Island"

Technical information
- Licensing authority: FCC
- Facility ID: 67119
- Class: A
- ERP: 6,000 watts
- HAAT: 76 meters (249 ft)
- Transmitter coordinates: 41°10′28.4″N 71°34′18.2″W

Links
- Public license information: Public file; LMS
- Webcast: Listen live (via iHeartRadio)
- Website: classical959.com

WCRI-FM (95.9 MHz; "Classical 95.9") is a radio station licensed to serve Block Island, Rhode Island, owned by Judson Group, Inc. It is a rare classical music station supported by commercial advertising, and not operated as a public radio station. WCRI-FM is affiliated with the World Classical Network (WCN).

WCRI-FM has an effective radiated power (ERP) of 6,000 watts as a Class A station, its transmitter is located off Ocean Avenue at Beach Avenue in New Shoreham. The station's studios are on South County Trail in Exeter.

== History ==
The original construction permit for the station was granted on October 16, 1990, with the call sign WVBI assigned on November 30. The station signed on June 13, 1994, though the license to cover was not issued until April 12, 1995.

The station has always had a classical format. WVBI initially had a limited programming schedule mainly from the now-defunct Classic FM network. The station's signal had trouble covering even Block Island. Charles River Broadcasting Company acquired WVBI in early 1999, at which point it was renamed WCRI. The station then performed upgrades, affiliating with WCN which was commonly owned with WCRI. A new tower was constructed in 2001 which also enabled stereo broadcasting. Translator station W243AI (96.5) in Newport had relayed Charles River Broadcasting flagship WCRB since the translator's sign-on in 1996, and it carried WCRI's programming for several years before becoming a WMVY translator in 2004.

Charles River Broadcasting announced on October 27, 2005, that it was exploring the sale of its properties, with Judson Group, Inc. purchasing WCRI and sister station WCNX in 2006. Judson Group, Inc., includes the son (Christopher Jones) and grandsons (Jamie Jones and Jefferey Jones) of broadcasting pioneer Ted Jones, founder of Charles River Broadcasting and WCRB.

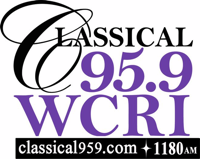
Logo while simulcasting on 1180

WCRI began to simulcast on 1180 AM on October 1, 2011, replacing WCNX; to reflect this, the station added the "-FM" suffix on September 8, 2011. (The AM station was sold to Red Wolf Broadcasting Corporation in 2014, and dropped the WCRI-FM simulcast for a Red Wolf-programmed oldies format under the WSKP call sign in December 2013.)
