= Jay Severin =

American talk radio host (1951–2020)

- Born: James Thompson Severino III; January 8, 1951; Poughkeepsie, New York, U.S.
- Died: July 7, 2020 (aged 69); Beverly, Massachusetts, U.S.
- Occupation: Political commentator
- Spouse: Renee Melanie Klock
- Parent(s): Iris Severino; James Thompson Severino

James Thompson Severino III (January 8, 1951 – July 7, 2020), known professionally as Jay Severin, was an American political talk radio personality and Republican political consultant. Severin worked mostly in Boston, at WTKK (now WBQT) and at WXKS Talk 1200 in 2011 and 2012 as an afternoon talk host. He also hosted shows in New York City at 710 WOR and at TheBlaze Radio Network.

== Biography ==
=== Early life ===
Severin was born in the Hudson Valley region of New York State. His mother was a writer and his father was a direct mail advertising entrepreneur. He spent at least a portion of his childhood and teen years in Poughkeepsie, New York where he founded his sixth grade civics club and school newspaper. He was on his high school lacrosse team. He later graduated in the Vassar College class of 1974 and studied at Boston University.

=== Political and radio career ===
Severin worked in New York City for Republican political consultant David Garth. In 1979, Severin started Severin Aviles Associates to direct strategy and produce media for Republican candidates. He worked on campaigns for the U.S. House, U.S. Senate, gubernatorial elections, as well as the presidential bids of George H. W. Bush. and Pat Buchanan.)

Filling in for Gene Burns starting in October 1994, Severin began work as a talk show host on 710 WOR, and worked there during the afternoon drive time slot until June 1996 when he was replaced by Bob Grant.

In Boston, he accepted a late-night talk show position on 680 WRKO which lasted from April to July 1999. Starting in late 1999, he began hosting an afternoon talk show called "Extreme Games" on WTKK.

Severin's theme music was an edited version of "Heavy" by Collective Soul, consisting only of the intro and bridge, and it was played at the beginning of each hour. His bumper music typically included selections from classic rock, blues, and heavy metal. He nicknamed his audience "The Best and Brightest" and often referred to them as "fellow infomaniacs," a portmanteau of "information" and "nymphomaniac." Listeners who dialed into his show while driving were billed as "calling from the quaint New England village of Car."

=== Controversies and termination from WTKK ===
In April 2004, when a caller said United States citizens should "befriend Muslims living in the United States," Severin replied, "the vast majority" of those Muslims "... are not loyal to the United States and are ready, when the time comes, to take over this country ... You think we should befriend them. I think we should kill them." On April 25, 2004, Severin said his comments were directed at terrorists, not Muslims in general. He stated, "I certainly regret any discomfort that may have been caused by the misunderstanding of my remarks." The Council for American Islamic Relations (CAIR) unsuccessfully called for Severin's dismissal.

On April 30, 2009, Severin said Mexicans were "the world's lowest of primitives". He said "Its [Mexico's] millions of leeches from a primitive country come here to leech off you and, with it, they are ruining the schools, the hospitals, and a lot of life in America". Severin was suspended until June 3, 2009, at which time he apologized by saying (in part), "My remarks were hurtful, unkind and wrong. For these remarks and for failing to meet the standards you are right to expect of me, I am sincerely sorry."

In March 2011, Severin said, "I slept with virtually every young college girl I hired to be an intern or an employee for my firm." Following this statement, Severin was fired from WTKK. Greater Media said, "Severin was let go because he did not maintain an appropriate level of civility and adhere to a standard that respects our listeners and the public at large....it had become clear at several points in the past two years that Jay was either unwilling or unable to maintain our standards on the air. It's for that reason we have made the decision to end our relationship."

=== WXKS Talk1200 AM ===
Severin returned to Boston-area radio on August 18, 2011 on WXKS Talk1200 AM, which had converted from a Spanish-language station to conservative talk. He still delivered pointed commentary on politics and current events but avoided controversies such as those in the years on WTKK. On August 7, 2012, as part of the format change to Comedy 1200 effected on August 13, Severin was dropped from the schedule. The move also affected morning talk host Jeff Katz, as well as nationally syndicated host Rush Limbaugh, who returned to WRKO.

=== TheBlaze ===
Starting in October 2012 Severin began broadcasting with TheBlaze Radio network. Run by Glenn Beck, the network is available through online streaming, SiriusXM, iHeartRadio, Dish Network satellite television, Verizon Fios, Apple TV, Roku, iPhone and Android, and select cable providers across the United States. The Jay Severin Show on The Blaze was cancelled; the last air date was September 2, 2016.

=== Later career ===
In February and March 2020, Severin hosted a weekend show on WBOQ, an adult contemporary music station in Gloucester, Massachusetts.

=== Personal life ===
Severin's first marriage was to Kathleen Cooney, one of his partners in the Severin-Aviles consulting firm.

On May 17, 1997, Severin remarried, to Renee Melanie Klock, in Sag Harbor, New York in the Old Whaler's First Presbyterian Church. They resided in Ipswich, Massachusetts.

=== Death ===
Severin suffered a massive stroke on July 7, 2020, and died later that evening at Beverly Hospital in Beverly, Massachusetts. Severin had previously tweeted that he was battling cancer but declared on May 26 that he had seen his doctor and was "cancer free".

== Philosophical and political views ==
Severin described himself as a "radical libertarian, a libertine." Within his capacity as a conservative talk show host, pundit, and while on air, Severin described Hillary Clinton as "the devil" and Barack Obama as a "domestic enemy of the [U.S.] Constitution."

== Awards ==
In July 2004, Severin was nominated for a National Association of Broadcasters Marconi Radio Award for the Major Market Personality of the Year.

== See also ==
- Talk radio
