= WBQT (FM) =

Rhythmic contemporary radio station in Boston

- Boston, Massachusetts; United States
- Broadcast area: Greater Boston
- Frequency: 96.9 MHz (HD Radio)
- Branding: Hot 96-9

Programming
- Format: Rhythmic hot AC
- Subchannels: HD2: Playa (tropical)

Ownership
- Owner: Beasley Broadcast Group; (Beasley Media Group Licenses, LLC)
- Sister stations: WBOS; WBZ-FM; WKLB-FM; WRCA; WROR-FM

History
- First air date: 1945
- Former call signs: W1XHR (1945–48); WXHR (1948–65); WXHR-FM (1965–67); WJIB (1967–90); WCDJ (1990–93); WBCS (1993–96); WKLB-FM (1996–97); WSJZ (1997–99); WTKK (1999–2013)

Technical information
- Licensing authority: FCC
- Facility ID: 25050
- Class: B
- ERP: 22,500 watts
- HAAT: 224 meters (735 ft)
- Transmitter coordinates: 42.347°N 71.083°W

Links
- Public license information: Public file; LMS
- Webcast: Listen live; Listen live (via TuneIn)
- Website: hot969boston.com

WBQT (96.9 MHz "Hot 96-9") is a commercial FM radio station in Boston, Massachusetts, owned by the Beasley Broadcast Group and airing an urban-leaning rhythmic hot AC radio format. WBQT's studios and offices are located in Waltham, and it transmits from atop the Prudential Tower in Boston's Back Bay neighborhood.

== History ==
=== Classical and beautiful music ===
The station originated in 1945 as W1XHR (later WXHR), owned by Harvey Radio Laboratories and programming a classical music format. In 1966, WXHR was sold to a joint venture of Kaiser Broadcasting and the Boston Globe, and in 1967, became beautiful music station WJIB (whose AM successor operates out of the old Harvey Radio Labs building in Cambridge). WJIB's music and programming director was Marlin Taylor who instituted the beautiful music format.

=== Smooth jazz to country and back ===
After several further ownership changes—first to General Electric (GE) in 1972, then to NBC in 1983 (three years before the merger between NBC's parent company, RCA, and GE) and Emmis Communications in 1988—it flipped to smooth jazz as WCDJ, "CD96.9", on October 26, 1990. The first song under the new format was "Breakout" by Swing Out Sister.

After Greater Media bought the station in May 1993, the station began stunting with a simulcast of new sister station WMJX at 1:00 p.m. on May 4 of that year. Two days later, at 4:00 p.m., WCDJ flipped to country as WBCS, "Country 96.9". The first song was "Here We Are" by Alabama. The station became WKLB-FM on August 24, 1996, after the previous WKLB-FM was bought by Greater Media and consolidated with WBCS, with its frequency being converted to WROR-FM. Smooth jazz returned at noon on August 22, 1997, after a format swap with what had been WOAZ (now WCRB); the station took on the new call sign WSJZ.

=== FM talk ===
On September 7, 1999, WSJZ flipped to talk, completing a one-month transition to the format, and the station changed its call letters to WTKK. During its tenure as a talk station, WTKK used several monikers: "96.9 FM Talk" from its 1999 launch until 2007, "96.9 WTKK: Boston's Talk Evolution" from 2007 until 2010, "96.9 Boston Talks" from 2010 until September 2012, and "News Talk 96.9" from September 2012 until its January 2013 demise.

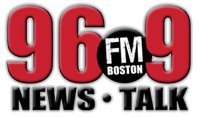
WTKK's last logo as a talk station, used from November 7, 2012, to January 2, 2013

In April 2007, WTKK management attempted to add Boston Herald columnist and talk-show host Howie Carr to its lineup, when the station's syndicated morning show Imus in the Morning was cancelled after Don Imus' comments about the Rutgers University women's basketball team got him fired by CBS Radio. Carr's long-time radio employer and WTKK's chief rival, Entercom-owned WRKO, blocked that move by exercising a clause in Carr's contract allowing it to make a matching counter-offer. Carr held out until November 16, 2007, after which point Carr returned to WRKO. On December 3, 2007, WTKK resumed broadcasting Imus in the Morning when it was picked up by WABC in New York City and syndicated by ABC Radio Networks. Over time, Imus' hours were cut back on WTKK, ultimately only airing for two hours every weekday morning. In January 2011, WTKK dropped Imus from the lineup completely in favor of an extended edition of the local late morning team of Jim Braude and Margery Eagan.

WTKK fired the controversial Jay Severin, a host since 1999, in April 2011 after he said he had slept with female interns at a company he had owned, and defended the practice. He was officially replaced in June 2011 by radio host Doug Meehan. Two months later, when rival station WXKS hired Severin for afternoon drive, WTKK shuffled its lineup to place politics-heavy Michael Graham in the 3:00 p.m. slot. The lineup at this point included Eagan and Braude, followed by various hosts in late mornings, then syndicated talker Michael Smerconish, followed by "The Daily Wrap", hosted by Michael Castner and syndicated by the Wall Street Journal Radio Network, then the syndicated John Batchelor and Overnight America shows.

=== Hot 96-9 ===
In December 2012, Greater Media registered several web domains for WTKK, pointing that the future of the news/talk format was in serious doubt due to low ratings (in its last book as a talk station, WTKK had a 1.9 share of the market in the Boston Arbitron radio market ratings). Many of the domains included the word "Beat", pointing to an urban contemporary, rhythmic CHR, or rhythmic AC format. Other domains pointed to possible adult hits, oldies, all-news, sports talk, active rock, dance music, adult contemporary, classic rock, mainstream rock, alternative rock, adult album alternative, or CHR formats. Further fueling the rumors of a format flip, on December 17, 2012, morning host Doug Meehan left to pursue a television opportunity in Arizona, while afternoon host Michael Graham left when his contract was not renewed. In addition, weekend hosts were told the last weekend of 2012 that their shows would not continue in the new year.

Stunt logos as "Power 96.9", "Nova 96.9", "96.9 Mike FM" and "96.9 The Bone".

In compliance with a press release by Greater Media on January 1, 2013, the station flipped at 10:00 a.m. the next day, after Jim Braude and Margery Eagan's final morning show, starting its new incarnation as urban contemporary-formatted "Power 96.9", which began with "Diamonds" by Rihanna. However, this would only turn out to be a stunt in a series of "micro-formats"; at 10:00 a.m. the following day, the station shifted to dance as "Nova 96.9". At Noon on January 4, the stunting shifted to adult hits, branded as "96.9 Mike FM" (using the former moniker/format of WMKK). At midnight on January 6, the stunting would shift to classic rock as "96.9 The Bone".

On January 8, 2013, at 11:00 a.m., WTKK debuted its new, permanent format: rhythmic AC, with the branding "Hot 96-9"; "Run This Town" by Jay-Z was the first song played. According to a press release from Greater Media, the station's direction would primarily be focused on current rhythmic and dance hits mixed in with recurrents from the 1980s and 1990s, as it targeted an audience who grew up listening to WJMN in the 1990s and 2000s, but wanted an alternative to the pop/rock orientation of WBMX. The flip brought the format back to Boston for the first time since WQSX flipped to WMKK in 2005. In addition, like WQSX, WTKK also used "The Rhythm of Boston" as its on-air slogan at launch. On March 20, 2013, WTKK changed its call sign to WBQT. Clear Channel soon obtained the former call sign for use on their current 106.1 FM facility in Raleigh, North Carolina.

In terms of staff announcements, Greater Media confirmed on January 3, 2013, that Pebbles, former long-time morning co-host on WJMN, would be WTKK's new morning show host. Also brought on from WJMN was Melissa, who became the afternoon drive time host from 2:00 p.m. to 7:00 p.m. In addition, on January 4, 2013, Greater Media announced that Jackson "Cadillac Jack" McCartney has been hired as Director of Programming for all 5 stations in their Boston cluster. On February 20, 2013, it was announced that former WJMN DJ Roy Barboza was named Music Director and Mix Show Coordinator. On March 1, 2013, it was announced that Baltazar, who co-hosted WJMN's morning show with Pebbles from 1995–2001, would become the new co-host of Hot 96.9's morning show beginning on March 4, 2013, reuniting him with Pebbles. In August 2013, former WJMN personalities Deirdre Dagata and Hustle Simmons became weekend hosts at the station. On January 8, 2014, former WXKS personality Jackson Blue became WBQT's new afternoon host, with Melissa moving to middays. In April 2014, former WJMN personality Bobby Blaze briefly became a Sunday afternoon/evening host (he would be replaced by Reggie Beas). On August 18, 2014, Baltazar was released from the station, and was replaced by former New England Patriots player and WBZ-FM host Jermaine Wiggins. In addition, Melissa moved to morning drive, with Dagata replacing her in middays. On January 7, 2016, WBQT announced that Ramiro, former morning show host at WJMN from 2001 until he was let go in July 2015 (as well as the host of the rhythmic edition of the syndicated Weekend Top 30), would host mornings with Wiggins, Pebbles and Melissa beginning January 14, 2016.

With the station having moved further toward rhythmic top 40 to compete more with WJMN, Mediabase moved the station to the Rhythmic panel in January 2015.

On July 19, 2016, Beasley Media Group announced it would acquire Greater Media and its 21 stations (including WBQT) for $240 million. The FCC approved the sale on October 6, 2016, and the sale closed on November 1, 2016.

In August 2024, the station's morning show began airing in syndication on other Beasley stations across the country.

In May 2026, longtime morning host Pebbles announced her departure to focus on other projects.

== WBQT-HD2 ==
WBQT-HD2 had programmed an all-Irish music format as "96.9 Irish", due in part to Boston's Irish history and influence. The HD2 subchannel had been on-air since 2006, when it debuted as "Classical 2.0". In late 2006, when Greater Media purchased classical station WCRB, 96.9-2 flipped to an all-Irish format. From early May to July 4, 2017, sister station WRCA simulcasted "96.9 Irish", while the station changed its branding to "Boston's Irish Channel". The station currently airs primarily Bloomberg News programming, with local news cut into the national programming of Bloomberg.

In October 2019, WBQT-HD2 flipped to a current-heavy urban contemporary format as "96.9 the Vibe". Beasley discontinued the format in February 2021, with the HD2 sub-channel going silent.

In November 2023, WBQT-HD2 signed back on with a tropical music format, branded as "Playa".
