= WOCN-FM =

- Orleans, Massachusetts; United States
- Broadcast area: Cape Cod
- Frequency: 104.7 MHz
- Branding: Ocean 104.7

Programming
- Format: Soft adult contemporary
- Affiliations: AP Radio

Ownership
- Owner: Sandab Communications; (Cape Cod Broadcasting License II, LLC)
- Sister stations: WFCC-FM; WKPE-FM; WQRC

History
- First air date: July 25, 1974
- Former call signs: WVLC-FM (1974–1977); WLOM (1977–1980); WKZE-FM (1980–1983); WKPE (1983–1985); WKPE-FM (1985–2007)
- Call sign meaning: reference to Atlantic Ocean

Technical information
- Licensing authority: FCC
- Facility ID: 8592
- Class: B
- ERP: 50,000 watts (horizontal); 36,000 watts (vertical)
- HAAT: 140 meters (460 ft)
- Transmitter coordinates: 41.780°N 70.009°W

Links
- Public license information: Public file; LMS
- Webcast: Listen live
- Website: www.ocean1047.com

WOCN-FM (104.7 FM, "Ocean 104.7") is a soft adult contemporary radio station licensed to Orleans, Massachusetts. The station is licensed to Sandab Communications (doing business as Cape Cod Broadcasting) and operated locally. WOCN-FM is a sister station to WQRC, WFCC-FM, and WKPE-FM.

WOCN-FM is frequently one of the Cape's most-listened-to radio stations, especially among adults 45 and older.

Artists that are played on WOCN-FM include the Beatles, Carly Simon, James Taylor, Norah Jones, Fleetwood Mac and others. WOCN-FM continues to serve the Cape Cod community with hourly weather forecasts, news updates and community information. Although previously playing more soft AC, it has shifted to play more current artists (e.g. Mariah Carey, Sara Bareilles, The Band Perry, Sheryl Crow, Cher).

== History ==
The station went on the air on July 25, 1974, as WVLC-FM, broadcasting on 104.7 MHz. Initially, the station was just a full-time simulcast of WVLC (1170 AM, now WFPB). WVLC-FM became WLOM in 1977.

In 1980, the FM band was still new territory for Top-40 radio. Boston's WXKS-FM (known at the moniker "Kiss 108") had only started one year prior and was very popular due to its unique mix of disco, rhythmic, and urban titles, routinely beating Boston's only mainstream Top 40 radio station at the time, WRKO-AM, in the ratings. Cape Cod needed its own similar station to compete in its own market, and in May 1980, 104.7 changed its call letters to WKZE-FM and began its own programming, branding itself "KZ 104 FM".

After just over three successful years in the Top 40/CHR format, the station rebranded itself as "Cape 104" on August 1, 1983; a few months later, the callsign was changed to WKPE. After the Top 40 format fragmented, "Cape 104" switched formats in the fall of 1992, rebranding itself "Oldies 104" to compete with Boston's "Oldies 103" and Nantucket's "Oldies 96" (which went Top-40 in January 1993).

During the spring of 1995, WKPE switched formats to a modern rock format and became "Rock 104.7, The Cape". It was in direct competition with WPXC. In 1999, the station was sold by Grancam Communications to Charles River Broadcasting. In September 1999, the station switched formats to classic rock.

With the 2006-07 dismantling of Charles River Broadcasting, Cape Cod Broadcasting, owner of WQRC and WOCN-FM, signed a contract to operate WFCC-FM and WKPE under a local marketing agreement, with the two stations still licensed to Charles River.

Upon the acquisition of Charles River Broadcasting's Cape Cod assets, it was announced that the popular "Ocean 104" would relocate to the stronger Class B signal of 104.7 MHz, swapping frequencies with WKPE-FM. The swap occurred on April 17, 2007.
