= Massachusetts Broadcasters Association =

Trade association

The Massachusetts Broadcasters Association (MBA) is a trade association for radio and television broadcast stations in the U.S. state of Massachusetts. It was founded in 1954. The association represents nearly 200 radio and television stations throughout the state.

The association's chief responsibility is the protection and promotion of over-the-air television and radio stations in Massachusetts. The association does this through advocacy, offering seminars and webinars, providing legal hotlines, awarding broadcasting scholarships, and various other programs.

It holds an annual convention and recognizes stations and individuals with annual awards.

== Other affiliations ==
It is a member of the National Association of State Broadcasters' Associations (NASBA).
