= Margery Eagan =

American talk radio host

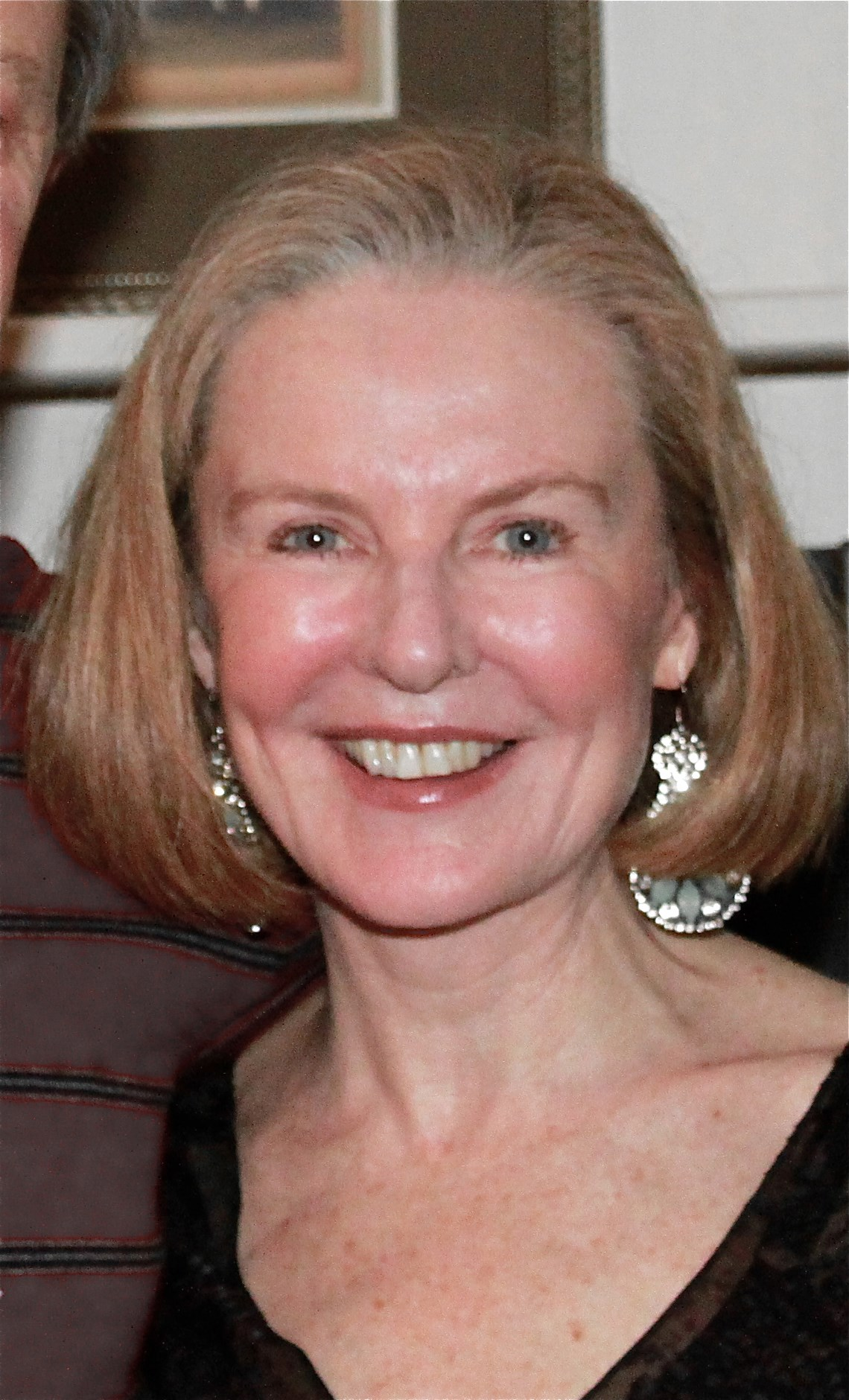
- Margery Eagan in 2010
- Born: June 13, 1954 (age 72); Fall River, Massachusetts
- Education: Stanford University
- Occupations: Radio host, Newspaper columnist
- Known for: newspaper columnist for the Boston Herald

Margery Eagan (born June 13, 1954) is a talk radio host and a frequent guest on CNN, ABC, Fox News, and the Imus in the Morning radio show. For many years she was a columnist for the Boston Herald. Subjects of her commentaries include gender/women's issues, Catholicism, and politics.

== Early life and education ==
Eagan, a third-generation Irish-American, was born to Daniel Eagan and Margaret Manning of Fall River, Massachusetts, and has an older sister, Elizabeth. Eagan was raised Roman Catholic but attended public school. She began writing stories as a child and was encouraged by her English teacher at Durfee High School in Fall River.

Eagan attended Smith College her freshman year, then transferred to Stanford University in Palo Alto, California, majoring in American Studies.

== Early career ==
After graduation from Stanford, Eagan took a job at the Fall River Herald News at a compensation rate of $15 per story. She was soon also freelancing for the New Bedford Standard-Times and The Boston Globe. At 24, she was hired as a full-time feature writer at the Burlington Free Press in Vermont. She returned to New Bedford a year later to become a columnist at the Standard-Times.

== Boston media career ==
In 1981, Eagan was hired as a general assignment reporter at the Boston Herald, and was given a column in 1984. She served a "refining stint" as a senior writer at Boston Magazine, and returned to her column at the Herald, where she wrote regularly until July 2014. She has received two nominations for GLAAD Media Awards in the category of Outstanding Newspaper Columnist. From 2014 to 2016, Eagan wrote a column at the Boston Globe's website about the Catholic Church, Crux, on spirituality and devotion to God. After the Globe shuttered the site, Crux began operating independently under editor John Allen with financial support from the Knights of Columbus, but parted ways with Eagan.

== Talk radio ==
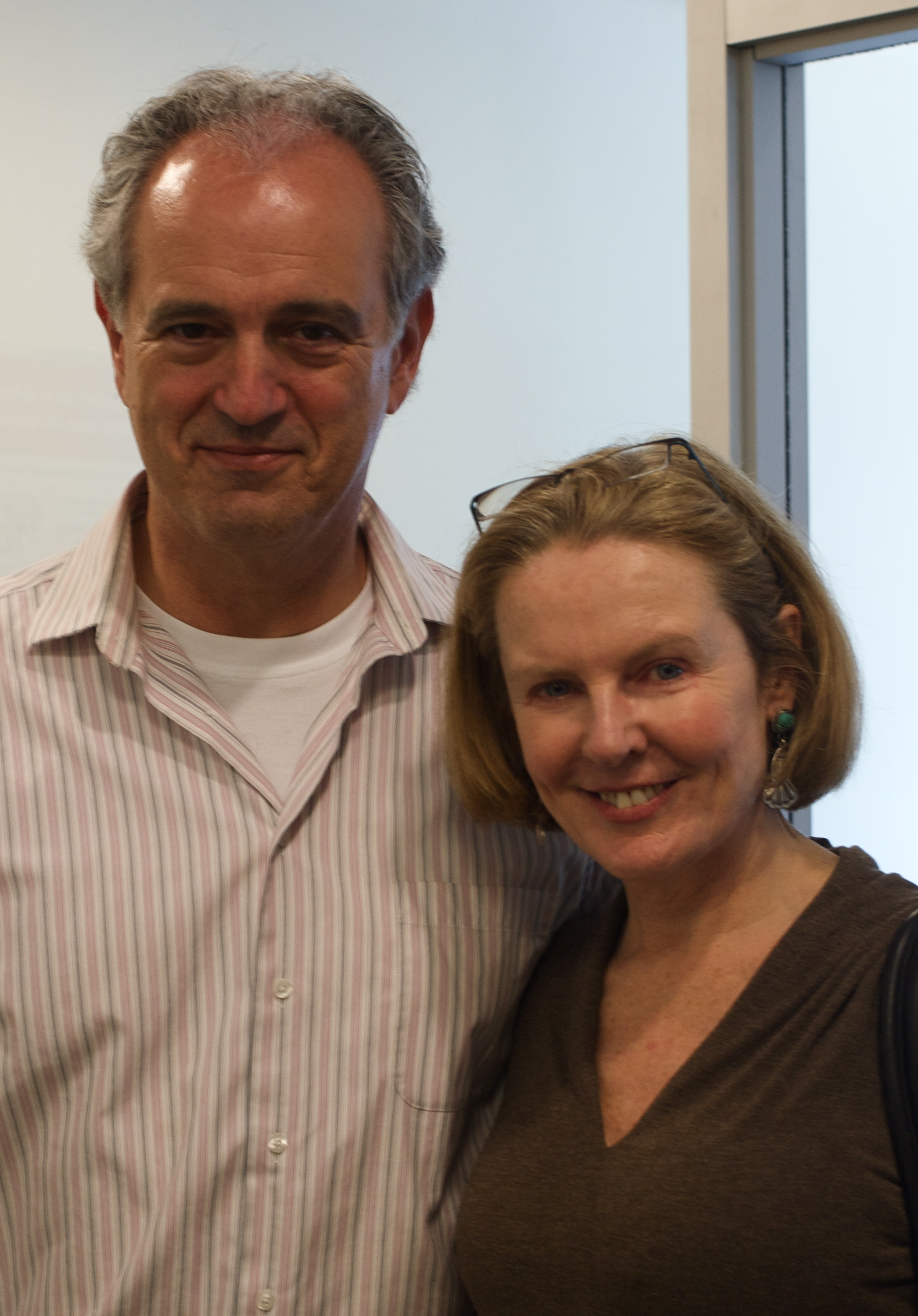
Jim Braude and Margery Eagan at a live radio broadcast in Brookline, Massachusetts, May 7, 2010

Eagan also co-hosted the Jim & Margery Show with Jim Braude on Boston's FM 96.9 WTKK. The show ended when that station flipped to an urban contemporary format on January 2, 2013. The team is now broadcasting on weekdays as Boston Public Radio on WGBH Radio, a Boston NPR station.

== Television ==
Eagan's columns and radio commentary occasionally draw the attention of national media. In 2002, she made a series of appearances on CNN's NewsNight with Aaron Brown to discuss the Roman Catholic sex abuse cases, and appeared a year later to comment on how the Iraq War was affecting newspaper circulation. That same month, she appeared on The O'Reilly Factor to discuss aspects of the Elizabeth Smart case. In 2007, Eagan appeared on CNN's Reliable Sources with Howard Kurtz to discuss her columns regarding the physical appearance of Hillary Clinton and the fashion sense of the wives of Republican Presidential candidates. Eagan is also a frequent presence on local Boston area television, notably WGBH's Greater Boston, on which she often appears as a panelist on that program's Friday evening "Beat the Press" edition, summarizing and critiquing media coverage of the prior week's news events

== Personal life ==
Eagan was married to longtime Boston Globe reporter and editor Peter Mancusi, having two daughters and one son. They are currently divorced.
