= WKPE-FM =

Coordinates: 41.691°N 70.189°W

- South Yarmouth, Massachusetts; United States
- Broadcast area: Hyannis, Massachusetts; Cape Cod
- Frequency: 103.9 MHz
- Branding: Cape Country 104

Programming
- Format: Country
- Affiliations: Westwood One

Ownership
- Owner: Sandab Communications; (Sandab Communications Limited Partnership II)
- Sister stations: WFCC-FM; WOCN-FM; WQRC

History
- First air date: April 5, 1991
- Former call signs: WVCU (1991); WATB (1991–1994); WOCN-FM (1994–2007)
- Call sign meaning: "Kape" (intentional misspelling, based on old slogan and the former WKZE-FM call sign for 104.7 FM)

Technical information
- Licensing authority: FCC
- Facility ID: 8586
- Class: A
- ERP: 5,500 watts
- HAAT: 104 meters (341 ft)

Links
- Public license information: Public file; LMS
- Webcast: Listen live
- Website: www.capecountry104.com

WKPE-FM (103.9 MHz), known as "Cape Country 104", is a country radio station licensed to South Yarmouth, Massachusetts, with its main studio in Hyannis, Massachusetts, shared with WFCC-FM, WQRC, and WOCN-FM. WKPE-FM is locally owned by "Cape Cod Broadcasting" (also known as Sandab Communications).

== History ==
The station signed on on April 5, 1991, under the callsign WVCU, which changed to WATB that June. On May 6, 1994, the station changed calls again to WOCN-FM. From the moment the station signed on, the station aired a soft AC format.

=== 2007 format change ===
Beginning on September 25, 2007, the station began stunting. Initially, the stunting involved playing one song in a loop. Each day the station added another song to the line up. On the tenth day of the stunt program (October 4, 2007), the songs began disappearing from the rotation. An announcement between songs also began to play, noting how many more days were left (counting down from 8 days) before the new format would be announced on October 12, 2007.

The list of songs played during the stunt were:

"American Pie" by Don McLean, "Please Don't Talk About Me When I'm Gone" by Ella Fitzgerald, "Rehab" by Amy Winehouse, "You're A Mean One Mr. Grinch" by Thurl Ravenscroft (the voice of Tony the Tiger), "Thriller" by Michael Jackson, "Wide Open Spaces" by The Dixie Chicks, "Dirty Water" by The Standells, "Gone Country" by Alan Jackson, and "SexyBack" by Justin Timberlake.

On October 12, 2007, the stunting ended. After being absent from Cape Cod radio for more than 15 years, "Cape 104, The Cape's Hit Music Station" was relaunched. This marked the return of Steve Binder (mornings 6 a.m. to Noon) from the original Cape 104 along with Shai Jackson (Noon to 6 p.m.), another Cape Cod radio local. The format initially changed from classic rock to hot AC; however, by the end of 2007, it had evolved into CHR as more mainstream tracks were added.

=== 2008 format change ===
On November 10, 2008, Cape 104 shifted to Christmas music for the holiday season, renaming themselves "Cape Cod's Christmas Station, Cape 104". On December 26, 2008, Cape 104 flipped to country, rebranding as "Cape Country 104, Today's Best Country And The Legends".
