= WUNR =

- Brookline, Massachusetts; United States
- Broadcast area: Boston, Massachusetts
- Frequency: 1600 kHz
- Branding: WUNR 1600 AM

Programming
- Format: Ethnic

Ownership
- Owner: Champion Broadcasting System, Inc.

History
- First air date: June 12, 1948
- Former call signs: WVOM (1948–1956); WBOS (1956–1969)
- Call sign meaning: "United Nations of Radio" (reflecting its ethnic format)

Technical information
- Licensing authority: FCC
- Facility ID: 10118
- Class: B
- Power: 20,000 watts
- Transmitter coordinates: 42°17′20.35″N 71°11′19.2″W

Links
- Public license information: Public file; LMS
- Webcast: Listen live
- Website: www.wunr.com

WUNR is a radio station serving the city of Boston, Massachusetts, licensed to nearby Brookline. It broadcasts on 1600 kHz on the AM radio dial with an ethnic format.

== History ==
The station first signed on in 1948 as WVOM, a local station. WVOM was one of the earliest stations in the Boston area to adopt 24-hour broadcasting on a regular basis. The station was sold to Herbert Hoffman in 1955, who changed the call letters to WBOS in 1956 and eventually added an FM station, WBOS-FM.

The AM station had some leased-time ethnic programming, but also for a time in the mid 1950s was home to one of the first rock-and-roll shows on Boston radio, hosted by a young Arnie "Woo-Woo" Ginsburg. In the late 1950s, WBOS was mostly a beautiful music simulcast on both AM and FM, although some ethnic programming remained on the AM side.

In the late 1960s, WBOS gradually abandoned simulcasting with WBOS-FM and increased the amount of ethnic programming on the AM side. The call letters of the AM station became WUNR in 1969 to reflect its ethnic format.

WUNR's transmitter and antenna are located in nearby Newton, Massachusetts. A few years back, the transmitter site was rebuilt, which resulted in a more powerful (20,000 watts) signal for the station in most of the Boston area, but still heavily "nulled" to the southwest to protect WWRL in New York City.
