= Jim Braude =

American journalist

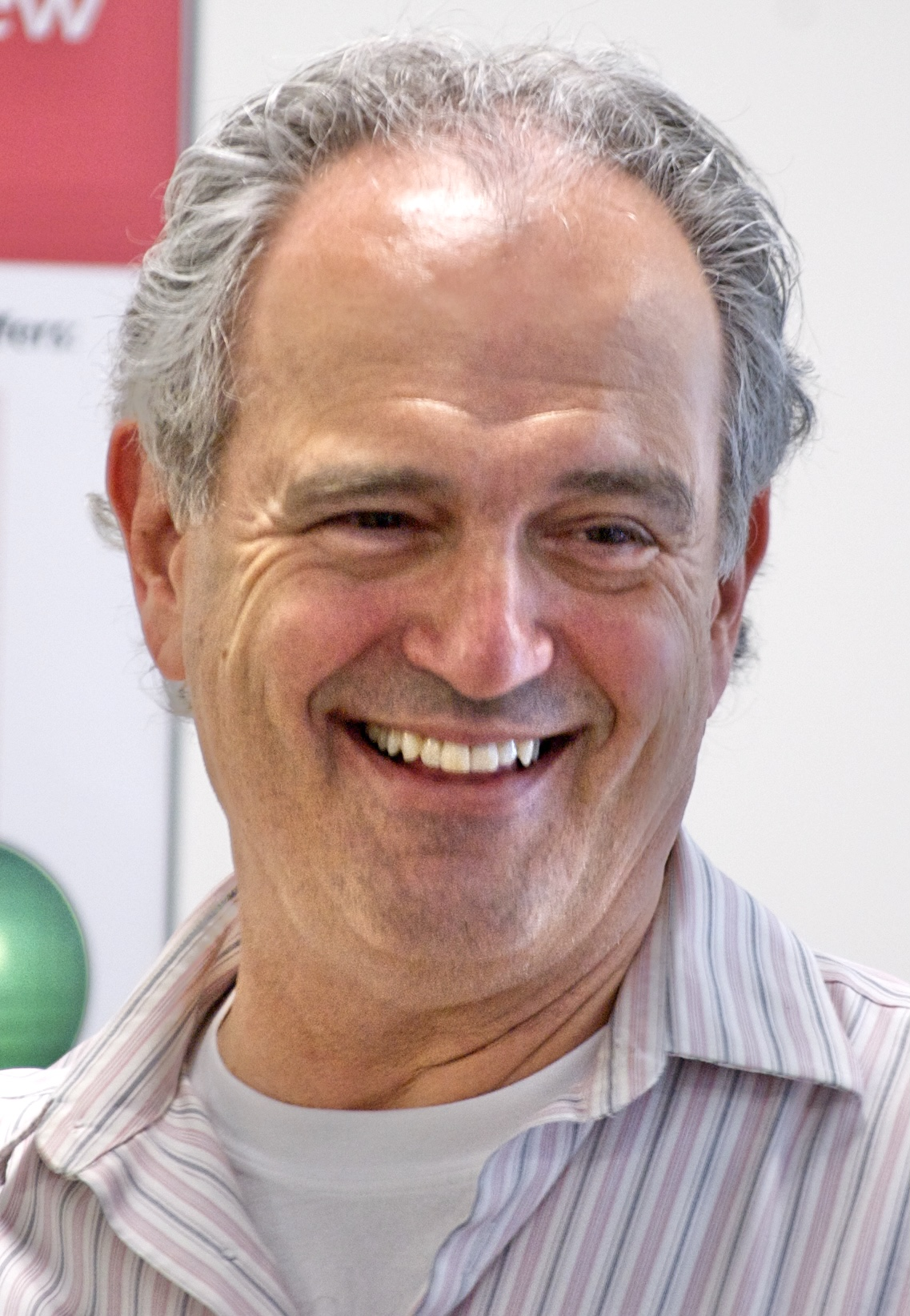
- Braude at a live radio broadcast event in Brookline, Massachusetts in May 2010
- Born: May 7, 1949 (age 77); Philadelphia, Pennsylvania
- Education: University of Pennsylvania (B.A.); New York University School of Law (J.D.)
- Occupations: lawyer, radio, and television host
- Spouse: Kristine Rondeau
- Website: jimbraude.net

James Spencer Braude (born May 7, 1949) is a lawyer, former union official, and Boston radio and television personality.

== Early life and education ==
Braude, an only child, was born in Philadelphia, Pennsylvania in 1949 and raised in the Center City area.

He graduated from Central High School in Philadelphia in 1966. He went to the University of Pennsylvania for his bachelor's degree and to New York University School of Law for his Juris Doctor degree.

== Personal life ==
Braude has two children adopted from China.

== Legal career ==
He began his legal career as a legal services lawyer in the South Bronx neighborhood of New York City with housing and prisoner's rights cases. He was the founder and first president of the National Organization of Legal Services Workers (NOLSW), a UAW affiliated union which represented staff in civil legal offices for the poor in various states.

He subsequently served as the executive director of the Tax Equity Alliance for Massachusetts (TEAM), a tax reform coalition. He published the magazine Otherwise, on American politics.

Braude later served as a Cambridge, Massachusetts City Councilor.

== Broadcast journalism career ==
He co-hosts, with Margery Eagan of Boston Public Radio, a midday talk show on WGBH radio that airs on weekdays. The pair formerly hosted the Jim & Margery Show talk show on WTKK, before that station became a music station in January 2013.

He also hosted Broadside with Jim Braude on New England Cable News (NECN). In mid-January 2015, he announced his departure from NECN.

On January 22, 2015, he was named as the executive editor and host of WGBH News local television news and analysis program, Greater Boston, replacing long-time host Emily Rooney. He departed the program on December 15, 2022.

== Awards ==
Braude won a local Emmy award and an Associated Press award for his work on NECN.
