= World Classical Network =

Classical music radio network

- Country: United States

Programming
- Format: Classical music

Ownership
- Owner: CCB Media

History
- Launch date: February 1998

Coverage
- Availability: Through 1 owned-&-operated station & 2 affiliates

The World Classical Network (WCN) is an internet-delivery classical radio broadcasting service owned by CCB Media in Hyannis, Massachusetts. The service has been in existence since February 1998, when it was owned and operated by Charles River Broadcasting. It filled a void left by the demise of the U. S. version of Classic FM, the classical music satellite service of SW Networks.

== Stations ==
WCN programming is carried on Cape Cod Broadcasting's WFCC-FM, licensed to Chatham, Massachusetts. WFCC is the WCN flagship station. The service is also syndicated, with the following affiliates:

- WCRI-FM/95.9 ("Classical 95.9") Block Island, Rhode Island
- WSCS/90.9 ("Classical 90.9") New London, New Hampshire

== Hosts ==
Current hosts on the World Classical Network include Mark Calder, Don Spencer, and Larry King. Longtime classical announcer Steve Murphy joined the WCN as morning host on September 16, 2008.
