= WQRC =

- Barnstable, Massachusetts; United States
- Broadcast area: Hyannis, Massachusetts; Cape Cod
- Frequency: 99.9 MHz
- Branding: 99.9 The Q

Programming
- Format: Adult contemporary
- Affiliations: AP Radio; Westwood One

Ownership
- Owner: CCB Media; (Sandab Communications Limited Partnership II)
- Sister stations: WOCN-FM; WKPE-FM

History
- First air date: July 20, 1970
- Call sign meaning: "Quality Radio for the Cape"

Technical information
- Licensing authority: FCC
- Facility ID: 58948
- Class: B
- ERP: 50,000 watts
- HAAT: 116 meters (381 ft)
- Transmitter coordinates: 41°41′19.3″N 70°20′47″W

Links
- Public license information: Public file; LMS
- Webcast: Listen live
- Website: www.999theq.com

WQRC (99.9 FM; "99.9 The Q") is a radio station broadcasting an adult contemporary format. Licensed to Barnstable, Massachusetts, United States, the station serves the Cape Cod region. The station is owned by Sandab Communications Limited Partnership II, doing business as CCB Media (Cape Cod Broadcasting Media) and features programming from AP Radio and Westwood One.

== Programming ==
99.9 The Q serves the adult population in the Cape Cod radio market, and has done so since 1970. The Q features hot adult contemporary music. The current air staff line-up includes Cheryl Park, and Steve Marcus. It is also an affiliate of “The Daly Download with Carson Daly”. Prior to 2014, the station was known for decades as "99.9 WQRC" before gradually phasing it out in favor of the current "99-9 The Q" branding.

== Former personalities ==
- Francis Broadhurst
