= Wall Street Journal Radio Network =

American business radio news service

The Wall Street Journal Radio Network was the radio arm of The Wall Street Journal, owned by Dow Jones.

The radio news service served over 400 radio stations across North America and provided various programming.

On November 12, 2014, Dow Jones announced that the Wall Street Journal Radio Network would cease operations at the close of the year. The move came after News Corporation had been split, with Dow Jones and other print publications moving to the new News Corp and broadcasting assets being spun off to 21st Century Fox (and, after that, Fox Corporation in 2019). It later became known that the network had been blacklisted because most of its affiliates carried conservative talk radio shows that were the subject of advertiser boycotts, and advertisers were unwilling to advertise on the network because of the chance that their barter commercials might air during one of the blacklisted shows.

In 2015, they added a podcast network called WSJ Podcasts.

== Programs ==
- The Wall Street Journal Report
- The Dow Jones Money Report
- Watching Your Wallet
- Barron's on Investment
- The Wall Street Journal This Morning
- The Wall Street Journal This Weekend
- The Sports Retort
