= The Lost 45s =

Musica radio and interview program

The Lost 45s with Barry Scott is an American syndicated classic hits retro music radio and interview program. It focuses on seldom played Top 40 hits from the 1970s and 1980s. The Boston Herald called it "the most successful weekend specialty show in Boston history".

== History ==
The show has been on the air since 1981 starting at Emerson College, then at a series of Boston radio stations: WZLX, WBOS, Mix 98.5, 93.7 WEGQ, WODS Oldies 103.3, WROR and WPLM-AM-FM. It entered national syndication in 1993 and streamed online since 1999.
