= WGBH =

WGBH may refer to:

- WGBH Educational Foundation, based in Boston, Massachusetts, United States
  - WGBH (FM), a public radio station at Boston, Massachusetts on 89.7 MHz owned by the WGBH Educational Foundation (Formerly branded as WGBH 89.7, now branded as GBH 89.7)
  - WGBH-TV, a public television station at Boston, Massachusetts owned by the WGBH Educational Foundation (Formerly branded as WGBH 2, now branded as GBH 2.)
  - WGBX-TV, a public television station at Boston, Massachusetts owned by the WGBH Educational Foundation (Formerly branded as WGBH 44, now branded as GBH 44)
