= WNCK =

- Nantucket, Massachusetts; United States
- Broadcast area: Nantucket, Massachusetts
- Frequency: 89.5 MHz
- Branding: 89.5 Quahog Country

Programming
- Format: Country

Ownership
- Owner: Nantucket Public Radio, Inc.
- Sister stations: WAZK

History
- First air date: 2002
- Former call signs: WAZK (2001–2002)
- Call sign meaning: Nantucket

Technical information
- Licensing authority: FCC
- Facility ID: 87830
- Class: A
- ERP: 820 watts
- HAAT: 35 meters (115 ft)
- Transmitter coordinates: 41°17′6.4″N 70°8′37.1″W

Links
- Public license information: Public file; LMS
- Webcast: Listen live
- Website: www.nantucketscountry.com

WNCK (89.5 FM) is a radio station known as "89.5 Quahog Country". It is licensed to and serves Nantucket, Massachusetts. The station is owned by Nantucket Public Radio, Inc.

== History ==
The station signed on in 2002 and originally programmed an adult contemporary format. On April 1, 2003, the station entered into a ten-year programming and operational agreement with the WGBH Educational Foundation; despite this, WNCK remained separately-run from WCAI, WNAN, and WZAI, the WGBH-owned and operated Cape and Islands NPR stations.

Originally, WGBH programmed WNCK as a simulcast of its primary radio service, offering a mixed-format of classical, jazz, folk, blues, Celtic music, and news. Upon the completion of WGBH's acquisition of Boston classical music station WCRB on December 1, 2009, WNCK switched its programming source to that station in an effort to improve WCRB's signal. (Concurrent with the acquisition, WGBH's own classical music programming, as well as the folk and blues programming, were replaced with increased news programming, essentially rendering the simulcast on WNCK largely redundant to WCAI, specifically the WNAN transmitter.)

On June 19, 2014, WNCK dropped its simulcast with WCRB to become a local NPR station for Nantucket. The station's lineup included Morning Edition and All Things Considered, with classical music being aired the rest of the day and all weekend. On December 28, 2020, the station changed its format to country music, branded as "89.5 Quahog Country". By this point, WNCK was being operated under common management with commercial station WAZK.
