= Allston–Brighton =

Neighborhoods of Boston

Coordinates: 42°21′16″N 71°8′30″W

Allston–Brighton is a set of two interlocking neighborhoods, Allston and Brighton, both part of the city of Boston, Massachusetts.

== Geography ==
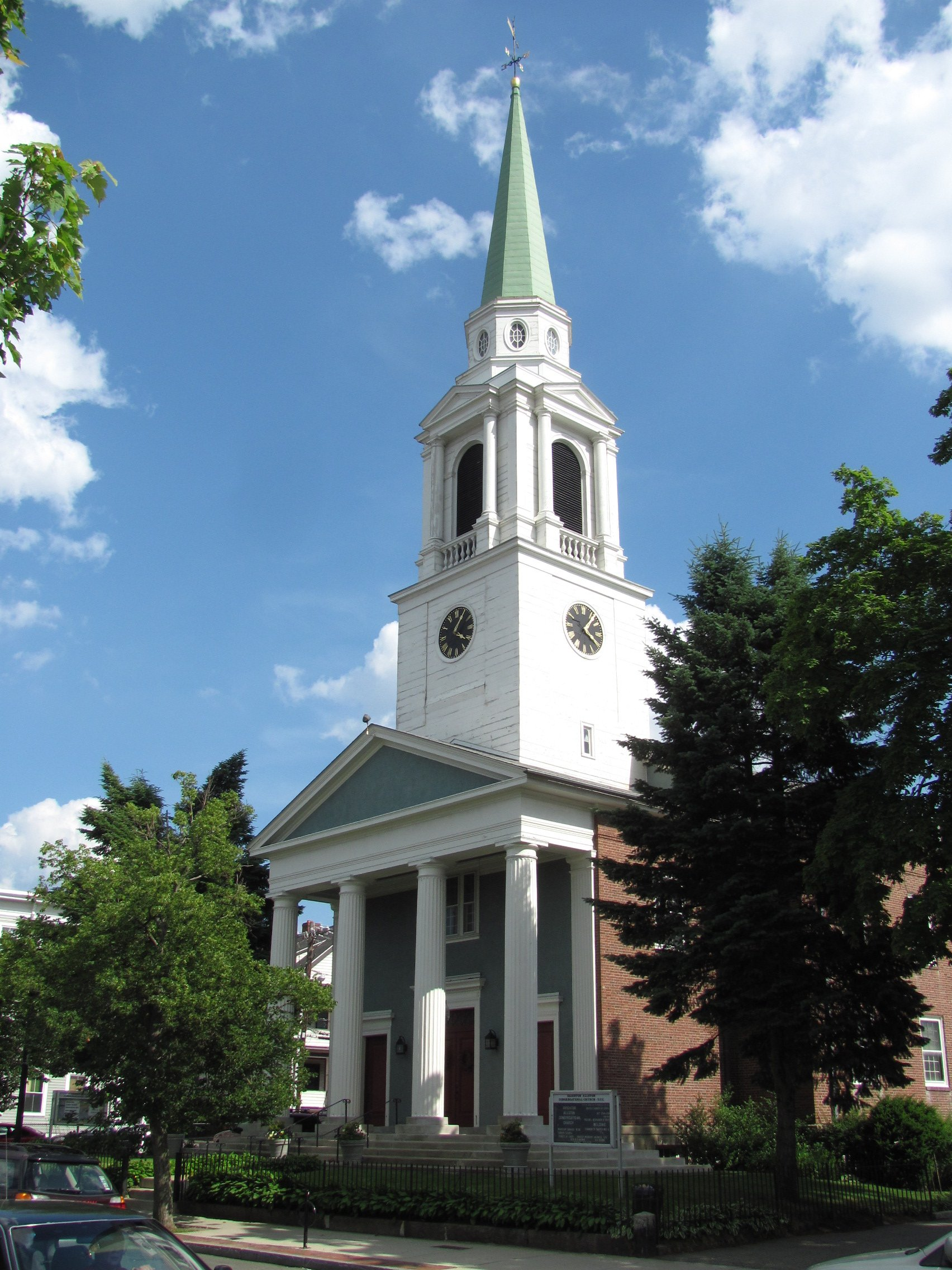
Brighton Allston Congregational Church

Allston and Brighton's border runs along Everett Street in the north, south along Gordon Street, and terminates at the Brookline town line along Kelton Street with land to the east of these streets falling in Allston, and to the west falling in Brighton.

Allston and Brighton are also identified by their respective postal zip codes (Allston's is 02134, Brighton's is 02135). Allston is generally understood as being in the northeast corner of Allston–Brighton, while Brighton is seen as the larger southwestern portion of Allston–Brighton encompassing Brighton Center and the generally less urbanized neighborhoods. They are connected to the rest of Boston by a tiny strip of land containing Boston University along the Charles River, with Brookline lying to the south and southeast, Cambridge to the north and Newton to the west, so they retain a very distinct neighborhood identity together.

Allston–Brighton is often perceived as being separate from the rest of the city since many urbanized Greater Boston areas such as Cambridge and Somerville are independently governed cities, but it is in fact part of the city of Boston. It is divided by the Massachusetts Turnpike, also known as Interstate 90, into the main southern area and a smaller northern spur, separated from Cambridge by the Charles River.

== History ==
Allston–Brighton was formerly an agrarian area known as Little Cambridge. It was incorporated into the city of Boston and received one of the earliest streetcar lines, becoming one of the nation's first streetcar suburbs and home to some of Boston's moderately wealthy classes.

== Demographics ==
Today the area is a middle-class urbanized area occupied largely by a mix of dense residential neighbourhoods and small businesses. It is home to the New Balance headquarters, and the WGBH Educational Foundation, operators of radio and television stations WGBH, WGBH-TV, and WGBX-TV; public broadcasters responsible for a large amount of national programming. Students from Boston's many universities are a large demographic in the area as Boston University’s campus falls in Allston and Boston College‘s campus straddles the Brighton and Newton city limits. Brighton Avenue at the heart of Allston has become a major nightlife destination featuring many bars, restaurants, and nightclubs.

== Sports ==
The combined neighborhood supports a youth hockey team, "Allston–Brighton Youth Hockey" which holds most practices at the Reilly Memorial Rink in Cleveland Circle.

== See also ==
- Neighborhoods in Boston
- Allston, Boston
- Brighton, Boston
- District 9, Boston
