= Rohmann =

Rohmann is a surname. Notable people with the surname include:

- Chris Rohmann, the former host of As Schools Match Wits on WGBY-TV channel 57 in Springfield, Massachusetts
- Eric Rohmann (born 1957), American writer and illustrator of children's books from Chicago
- Henrik Rohmann (1910–1978), Hungarian harpist and harp teacher
- Nico Rohmann (born 1952), Luxembourger former footballer
- Teresa Rohmann (born 1987), medley swimmer from Germany

== See also ==
- Rohrmann
- Rothmann
