= List of television stations in Massachusetts =

This is a list of broadcast television stations that are licensed in the U.S. state of Massachusetts.

== Full-power ==
- Stations are arranged by media market served and channel position.

Full-power television stations in Massachusetts
Media market	Station	Channel	Primary affiliation(s)	Notes	Refs
Boston	WGBH-TV	2	PBS		
Boston	WBZ-TV	4	CBS		
Boston	WCVB-TV	5	ABC		
Boston	WHDH	7	Independent		
Boston	WBTS-CD	15	NBC	(Note: Licensed as a low-power station to the city of Nashua, New Hampshire but transmits over the full-power spectrum of WGBX-TV.)	
Boston	WFXT	25	Fox		
Boston	WUTF-TV	27	UniMás	(Note: Licensed to Worcester, Massachusetts.)	
Boston	WSBK-TV	38	Independent		
Boston	WGBX-TV	44	PBS		
Boston	WWDP	46	Shop LC	(Note: Licensed to Norwell, Massachusetts.)	
Boston	WYDN	48	Daystar	(Note: Licensed to Lowell, Massachusetts.)	
Boston	WLVI	56	The CW	(Note: Licensed to Cambridge, Massachusetts.)	
Boston	WDPX-TV	58	Grit	(Note: Licensed to Woburn, Massachusetts.)	
Boston	WMFP	62	Independent	(Note: Licensed to Foxborough, Massachusetts.)	
Boston	WUNI	66	Univision	(Note: Licensed to Marlborough, Massachusetts.)	
Boston	WBPX-TV	68	Ion Television		
Springfield	WWLP	22	NBC, The CW on 22.2		
Springfield	WGGB-TV	40	ABC, Fox on 40.2		
Springfield	WGBY-TV	57	PBS		
~Albany, New York	WNYA	51	MyNetworkTV		
~Providence, Rhode Island	WLNE-TV	6	Roar	(Note: Licensed to New Bedford, Massachusetts.)	
~Providence, Rhode Island	WLWC	28	Independent		

== Low-power ==
Low-power television stations in Massachusetts
Media market	Station	Channel	Primary affiliation(s)	Notes	Refs
Boston	WHDT-LD	3	Infomercials		
Boston	WFXZ-CD	24	Biz TV		
Boston	WCEA-LD	26	Mas TV		
Boston	WCRN-LD	31	Various		
Boston	WMPX-LD	33	Daystar	(Note: Licensed to Dennis, Massachusetts.)	
Boston	W26EU-D	40	Daystar		
Springfield	WSHM-LD	3	CBS		
Springfield	WDMR-LD	14	Telemundo, TeleXitos on 14.2		
Springfield	WHTX-LD	43	Univision		
~Hartford, Connecticut	WTXX-LD	34	Various	(Note: Licensed to Springfield, Massachusetts.)	
~Providence, Rhode Island	WVMA-CD	17	Antenna TV	(Note: Licensed to Winchendon, Massachusetts.)	

== Translators ==
Television station translators in Massachusetts
Media market	Station	Channel	Translating	Notes	Refs
Springfield	WFXQ-CD	22	WWLP		
~Albany, New York	W32FW-D	13	WNYT	(Note: Licensed to Adams, Massachusetts.)	
~Albany, New York	W28DA-D	13	WNYT	(Note: Licensed to Pittsfield, Massachusetts.)	

== Defunct ==
- WCDC-TV Adams (1954–2017)
- WHDH-TV Boston (1957–1972)
- WJZB-TV Worcester (1953–1969)
- WNAC-TV Boston (1948–1982)
- WRLP Greenfield (1957–1978)
- WTAO-TV Boston (1953–1956)
- WXHR-TV Boston (1962–1962)
