= WFXZ-CD =

Television station in Boston

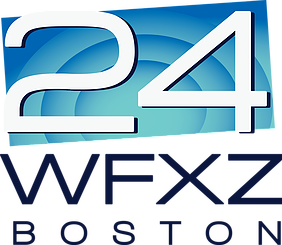
- Boston, Massachusetts; United States
- Channels: Digital: 5 (VHF), shared with WGBH-TV; Virtual: 24
- Branding: WFXZ 24

Programming
- Affiliations: 24.1: Biz TV

Ownership
- Owner: WGBH Educational Foundation
- Sister stations: TV: WGBH-TV; WGBX-TV; WGBY-TV; Radio: WCAI • WZAI • WNAN; WCRB; WGBH

History
- Founded: November 30, 1989
- First air date: November 9, 2000
- Former call signs: W29BA (1989–1999); W24CM (1999–2000); WVXN-LP (2000–2001); WVXN-CA (2001–2003); WFXZ-CA (2003–2010)
- Former channel numbers: Analog: 24 (UHF, 2000–2010); Digital: 25 (UHF, 2010–2015), 24 (UHF, 2015–2017), 19 (UHF, 2017–2019; shared with WGBH-TV)
- Former affiliations: Home shopping (2000–2001); MTV2 (2001–2006); Azteca América (2006–2012, 2016–2017); MundoFox/MundoMax (2012–2016)

Technical information
- Licensing authority: FCC
- Facility ID: 64833
- Class: CD
- ERP: 34 kW
- HAAT: 362.7 m (1,190 ft)
- Transmitter coordinates: 42°18′10.7″N 71°13′4.9″W

Links
- Public license information: Public file; LMS
- Website: wfxz.biz

WFXZ-CD (channel 24) is a low-power, Class A television station in Boston, Massachusetts, United States. The station is owned by the WGBH Educational Foundation. WFXZ-CD's studios are located in Woburn.

Under a channel sharing arrangement, WFXZ-CD shares transmitter facilities with co-owned PBS member station WGBH-TV (channel 2) on Cabot Street in Needham. Despite WFXZ-CD legally holding a low-power Class A license, it transmits using WGBH-TV's full-power spectrum. This ensures complete reception across the Boston television market.

== History ==
The station's construction permit was originally granted on November 30, 1989, as W29BA, operating on channel 29, which would be licensed to nearby Lawrence. However, by the time finally it signed on the air with a home shopping service in early 2000, it had moved to channel 24, was licensed to Boston and adopted the W24CM call sign.

A few months later, channel 24 changed its call letters to WVXN-LP. In 2001, the station was upgraded to Class A status as WVXN-CA and dropped home shopping programming in favor of affiliating with MTV2. The station changed its callsign to WFXZ-CA in 2003. In July 2006, the station became the Boston affiliate of the Azteca América network.

WFXZ-CD logo under its MundoFox affiliation

WFXZ flash-cut its signal to digital transmission in 2010. Longtime owner Randolph Weigner agreed to sell WFXZ to Prime Time Partners in December 2011. The station became a charter MundoFox affiliate when the network formally launched on August 13, 2012, with Azteca America programming moving to its second digital subchannel; it returned to primary status early on December 1, 2016, due to MundoMax ending operations (shortly after Fox International Channels dropped out of the joint venture in 2015). During its affiliations with MundoFox/MundoMax and Azteca América, WFXZ-CD was carried on Xfinity digital channels 721 and 981, and Verizon FiOS channel 20. A third subchannel, c. 2014, carried Hope Channel.

In the FCC's incentive auction, WFXZ-CD sold its spectrum for $63,949,770 and indicated that it would enter into a post-auction channel sharing agreement. On September 8, 2017, the station entered into a channel sharing agreement with WGBH-TV (channel 2); concurrently, Prime Time Partners agreed to donate the WFXZ license to the WGBH Educational Foundation. WFXZ shut down its UHF digital channel 24 transmitter on December 3, 2017, and began channel-sharing on WGBH-TV's channel 19 transmitter; WGBH's acquisition of the station was completed on December 21, 2017, at which point the station dropped Azteca América for BizTV. Concurrently, the station's carriage on Xfinity and Verizon FiOS was discontinued.

== Subchannels ==
Subchannels of WGBH-TV and WFXZ-CD
License	Subchannel	Res.	Short name	Programming
WGBH-TV	2.1	1080i	WGBH-HD	PBS
WGBH-TV	44.1	1080i	WGBX-HD	PBS (WGBX-TV)
WGBH-TV	66.5	480i	ON AIR	Infomercials (WUNI)
WFXZ-CD	24.1	480i	WFXZ	Biz TV

Simulcast of subchannels of another station
Broadcast on behalf of another station
