= WCAI =

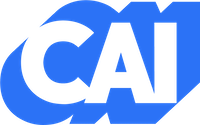
- Woods Hole, Massachusetts; United States
- Broadcast area: Hyannis, Massachusetts; Cape Cod
- Frequency: 90.1 MHz (HD Radio)
- Branding: CAI

Programming
- Format: Public radio; news/talk
- Subchannels: HD2: Simulcast of WCRB (classical music)
- Network: National Public Radio

Ownership
- Owner: WGBH Educational Foundation
- Sister stations: Radio: WCRB; WGBH; TV: WFXZ-CD; WGBH-TV; WGBX-TV; WGBY-TV

History
- First air date: September 25, 2000
- Call sign meaning: "Cape and Islands"

Technical information
- Licensing authority: FCC
- Facility ID: 8566
- Class: B1
- ERP: 12,500 watts
- HAAT: 73.5 meters (241 ft)
- Transmitter coordinates: 41°26′16.4″N 70°36′48.1″W
- Repeaters: 89.7 WGBH-HD3 (Boston); See also § Simulcasts

Links
- Public license information: Public file; LMS
- Webcast: Listen live
- Website: www.capeandislands.org

WCAI (90.1 FM) in Woods Hole, Massachusetts, WNAN (91.1 FM) in Nantucket, and WZAI (94.3 FM) in Brewster, are NPR member radio stations serving the Cape Cod and Islands area of southeast Massachusetts. They broadcast primarily news and information programming and are owned by the WGBH Educational Foundation in Boston. WCAI's studios are located within the Newton Wing of the Conservatory building on the Falmouth campus of Cape Symphony on Highfield Drive in Falmouth, and its transmission facilities are located in Tisbury. Its studios were formerly at the Captain Davis House at 3 Water Street in Woods Hole (a census-designated place in Falmouth); in October 2024, WGBH announced it was selling the Davis House as part of ongoing budget cuts.

The station, which first went on the air in 2000, was founded by independent radio producer Jay Allison and his organization, Atlantic Public Media, with construction and operation duties assigned to WGBH. Atlantic Public Media has also produced local programming for the station. WNAN went on the air on March 15, 2000. In 2005 the third signal, WZAI, went on the air, to improve broadcast coverage for the Cape and Islands. An online stream of the station is also available.

In 2007, the station won the prestigious Alfred I. duPont-Columbia Award, often called the Pulitzer Prize of broadcast journalism, for a 20-part series called "Two Cape Cods: Hidden Poverty on the Cape and Islands". The series was produced and reported by Sean Corcoran, and it highlighted numerous poverty issues in a region that often is thought of as playground for the rich. WCAI was the only radio station to win the award that year.

In 2020, the station rebranded as CAI, as part of a larger rebranding underwent by WGBH (which similarly dropped "W" from its branding organization-wide).

Apart from being owned by WGBH, there is no connection between the Cape and Islands NPR stations and WNCK in Nantucket, which formerly simulcast WGBH's primary radio service and later WCRB, a classical music station owned by WGBH. WCAI itself carries WCRB's programming on its second HD Radio channel, which was added in late 2013 after WCAI boosted its power.

WCAI logo used until August 2020.

== Simulcasts ==
Call sign	Frequency	City of license	Facility ID	ERP W	Height m (ft)	Class	Transmitter coordinates	Call sign meaning	First air date
WNAN	91.1 FM	Nantucket, Massachusetts	8600	2,300	64 m (210 ft)	A	41°17′6.4″N 70°8′37.1″W	Nantucket	March 15, 2000
WZAI	94.3 FM (HD)	Brewster, Massachusetts	162458	4,700	113.4 m (372 ft)	A	41°46′36.4″N 70°0′38.1″W	variation of WCAI	June 7, 2005
