= Andreas Klein =

- Born: Berlin
- Genres: Classical
- Occupation: Classical pianist
- Instrument: Piano
- Years active: 1974–present
- Website: andreasklein.com

Andreas Klein is a German-born classical pianist.

== Career ==
In 1972, Klein went to New York to study at the Juilliard School and graduated with a postgraduate diploma in 1974.

He was a piano faculty member of Texas Christian University.

He has appeared on WGBH Boston, APR in St. Paul and WFMT Chicago. He was the subject of a “Musicians Portrait” in Germany, and "Intermezzo with Andreas Klein" was televised by PBS.
