= As Schools Match Wits =

- Genre: Game show
- Created by: Leonard J. Collamore
- Directed by: Eric Jones
- Presented by: Beth Ward (2008–present); Chris Rohmann (2007–2008); John Baran (1991–2006); Phil Shepardson (1961–1991)
- Theme music composer: Leroy Anderson
- Opening theme: Bugler's Holiday
- Country of origin: United States
- Original language: English

Production
- Executive producers: Liz Preston, Mark St. Jean
- Producer: Tony Dunne
- Production locations: Westfield, MA (2007–present); Agawam, MA/Chicopee, MA (1961–2006)
- Camera setup: Multi-camera
- Running time: ~26 minutes

Original release
- Network: WWLP (1961-2006); WGBY (2007-present)
- Release: 1961 – present

As Schools Match Wits is a high school quiz show that airs on PBS member station WGBY in Springfield, Massachusetts. It is produced in association with Westfield State University. As Schools Match Wits is well known throughout Western Massachusetts and northern Connecticut.

== Gameplay ==
Two teams of four high school students compete in a trivia and academic knowledge competition. At the beginning of the show, there is a coin toss, and the winning team gets to make the first selection of a category and point value from the game board.

There are six categories, Arts & Entertainment, Literature, Math & Science, General Knowledge, Social Studies, and World Events. In each category, there are four questions, worth 30, 25, 20, and 15 points respectively.

After a team chooses a category and point value, it is asked a qualifying question on which the team may confer before offering an answer. If the team answers correctly, it is then asked several more questions, each of which has a point value; the team may again confer on each question before answering. In other words, the qualifying question is worth no points; points are scored by answering the questions that follow it. If a team misses the qualifying question, it is turned over to the opposing team. If the opposing team gives the correct answer, it has "capitalized" on the mistake and is then given a chance to answer the category's questions for the selected points. In general, the parts of the question that earn points are worth 5 or 10 points each, though on occasion, 30-point questions will have parts worth 15 points.

This round continues through several category-and-point-value selections, after which the first Lightning Round is played. The host asks as many questions in a specific category as possible in 90 seconds. Teams buzz in to answer, and may confer briefly. Correct answers are worth 5 points each; wrong answers cost 5 points.

Following the first Lightning Round, more regular game play takes place. Soon the final Lightning Round takes place; this is identical to the first except that each question is worth ±10 points. The final Lightning Round can be worth 200 points or more, depending on the pace of the round, and many games are decided by this final round.

Starting in the 2010-11 season, the game begins with a "Challenge Round," in which teams answer a series of toss-up questions worth 10 points each; this is followed with the first Lightning Round (5 points per question); the second half of the game is called the "Capitalization Round," which is played as above, and is followed by the second Lightning Round, with 5-point questions.

In the event of a tie at the end of the second Lightning Round, an overtime round consisting of another full-length Lightning Round begins immediately with a new category.

The show's participants are also interviewed over the course of game play; each student talks for 15 seconds or so, usually about activities in which he or she participates or interests he or she has.

== Playoffs ==
The way to determine the playoff teams is summed up best in the slogan for the show: "It's all about the points!" Only the top eight highest-scoring teams at the end of the season advance to the playoffs. This is different from the original format, where a winning team would return on the next show and needed to win three times to reach the playoffs. The current method means that a team could win their match, yet still fail to make the playoffs if their score was not one of the highest. On the flip side, a losing team could potentially make the playoffs if their score was high enough, although this is highly unlikely. The playoff format itself works in a single elimination format. The winning team receives the "Collamore Cup," named for Leonard Collamore, creator of the show and writer of the program through the 1960s and 1970s.

== History ==
As Schools Match Wits, which originally aired on WWLP in Springfield, Massachusetts, is a high school quiz competition that bills itself as "America's Longest Running High School Television Quiz Show Since 1961". (However, the DC-area It's Academic actually started 19 days earlier, on October 7 versus October 26 for As Schools Match Wits.) This high school quiz show includes schools from western Massachusetts and northern Connecticut. Its regular timeslot, from at least as far back as the early 1970s until its switch to WGBY, had been Saturdays at 7:30 p.m. However, it has aired at other times as well. This was especially true from the late 1990s until 2002, when the show would sometimes air on Sunday mornings because NBC's NBA basketball telecasts preempted its traditional timeslot.

Phil Shepardson, an English professor at Westfield State College, hosted the show from its start in October 1961 until June 1991. Shepardson died in June 2011 at the age of 76. John Baran (WWLP's station manager) took over that autumn when the show returned from its annual summer hiatus. Baran hosted from 1991 to 2006 and Chris Rohmann took over in January 2007 due to the show's switch to WGBY.

The show's creator, Leonard Collamore, was the head question writer for 22 years, from 1961 to 1983. He was followed by Phil Shepardson from 1983 until his retirement in 1991. Except for the 1997-1998 season, Dr. Todd Rovelli has been the question writer from 1991 to the present.

For many years, the show's theme music was Leroy Anderson's "Bugler's Holiday", performed by the Boston Pops under Arthur Fiedler's direction. (This information would occasionally appear in questions used on the show.) At least two different Boston Pops recordings were used on the air over the years: one dating from 1967, and another from 1969 that featured a guest performance by legendary trumpeter Al Hirt. The 1969 recording was dubbed off of a record owned by one of the station's engineers. In September 2000, "Bugler's Holiday" was replaced in favor of a generic-sounding, far less distinctive piece because of escalating music licensing fees. "Bugler's Holiday" returned as the show's theme in 2007, played against photos of random historical content and past episode clips. Ethan Lillie, an acclaimed concert pianist and jazz composer, composed an alternate version of the "Bugler's Holiday" theme, which was used in a November 2004 episode of ASMW to commemorate the fortieth anniversary of Lillie's induction into the jazz hall of fame.

The show was shot using the same light-blue-and-white set from 1982 until 2000, with trim and background changes added over the years. At one time, this set had also served as the anchor desk used on the air for WWLP's newscasts. The set used immediately prior to the light-blue-and-white set was orange, black and dark green in color.

Through most of the 1970s and 1980s, a localized version of this series also aired in Dayton, Ohio on WKEF, which was owned at the time by WWLP's original owner, William Putnam. The Dayton version featured several different hosts during its run, one of whom was future conservative talk show host Mike Gallagher.

=== Cancellation and revival ===
In September 2006, WWLP cancelled the program after 45 seasons, citing the cost of new FCC regulations requiring all U.S. over-the-air television programming to be closed-captioned for the deaf and hard of hearing. Shortly after the cancellation was announced, however, WWLP, WGBY and Westfield State College announced a solution to keep the program on the air. WWLP has licensed the program to Westfield State College, and it returned for a 46th season in January 2007 as a co-production of Westfield State College and WGBY. The program will continue to air on Saturday evenings, now on WGBY, and with "Bugler's Holiday" as the program's returned theme. It returned to the airwaves at 7:00 p.m. on January 20, 2007.

The new series began taping in early January 2007. Schools Match Wits emulates the classic high school quiz-show and aims to introduce a new generation of high-school students to public competitions that stress knowledge over physical ability.

When the new season of As Schools Match Wits premiered, the show welcomed radio personality and writer Chris Rohmann as its new host. Following the 2007–08 season, Rohmann was replaced by Beth Ward as host.

== Collaboration with WGBH ==
In 2010, As Schools Match Wits partnered with the new Boston WGBH-TV production, High School Quiz Show hosted by 1996 MIT graduate Dhaya Lakshminarayanan, to send their own qualifying teams from Western Massachusetts to also compete in WGBH-TV Boston's matches. One of the western Massachusetts schools sent, Longmeadow High School, went on to win the WGBH-TV High School Quiz Show Massachusetts state championship in June 2010, defeating The Bromfield School from Harvard, Massachusetts.
