= WJMF =

WJMF may refer to:

- WJMF (FM), a radio station (88.7 FM) licensed to Smithfield, Rhode Island, United States
- WJMF-LD, a low-power television / radio station (channel 6 / 87.7 FM) licensed to Jackson, Mississippi, United States
