= WJMF (FM) =

Satellite of WCRB, Boston
- Smithfield, Rhode Island; United States
- Broadcast area: Providence, Rhode Island
- Frequency: 88.7 MHz (HD Radio)
- Branding: CRB

Programming
- Format: Classical music
- Subchannels: HD2: College radio

Ownership
- Owner: Bryant University
- Operator: WGBH Educational Foundation

History
- First air date: November 1973

Technical information
- Licensing authority: FCC
- Facility ID: 7650
- Class: A
- ERP: 1,200 watts
- HAAT: 163 meters (535 ft)
- Transmitter coordinates: 41°48′12.4″N 71°33′25.2″W

Links
- Public license information: Public file; LMS
- Website: www.classicalwcrb.org; HD2: wjmf.bryant.edu

WJMF (88.7 MHz) is an FM radio station in Smithfield, Rhode Island, owned by Bryant University. The station's primary channel is a classical music station simulcasting WCRB from Boston. It serves the Providence area. WJMF also operates an HD2 channel run by Bryant University students; from 1973 until 2011, this service was heard on its primary channel.

== History ==
WJMF began at the Bryant College Providence, R.I. campus. The original frequency was 91.5 MHz. Because of the efforts of Dr. Barry Fullerton and Bryant student/WJMF general manager Stephen Boulter, WJMF was launched at the Bryant campus. Its constitution was drafted in 1972 and in November 1973, the radio station began broadcasting from the Bryant College Unistructure. The station has been student-run from its founding.

The station began broadcasting in mono with a power of 10 watts. In 1977, the station began broadcasting in stereo. When the station received approval to increase its operating power from 10 to 225 watts, the FCC required the station to change its frequency from 91.5 to 88.7 MHz. On Thursday, May 14, 1981, the station began operating out of the Bryant College Multipurpose Activity Center (MAC). President William T. O'Hara presided over the release of 225 balloons in front of the MAC to celebrate the station's new location and new operating power.

In early 1989, general manager Don Desfosse announced that the station had simultaneously added its 2,000th vinyl record album, and its first compact disc (CD) player. Just a few months later, Desfosse added a new sound console (sound board), moving the 1970s-era sound board to the production studio, and added two new commercial-broadcast-grade CD players to the on-air studio.

A blue neon light has sat in the window of WJMF studios since 1991. It a symbol of the station's location and on-air time, and a tribute to the memory of Michael T. Cain. Cain was killed at the cliff walks in Newport, Rhode Island. He was the WJMF general manager who oversaw the purchase of the neon sign. The project was completed after his death. An official sign lighting took place with the Cain family present.

In the 1990s, with student enrollment down at colleges and universities worldwide, Bryant closed three of its residence halls. WJMF moved from the MAC to Residence Hall 6. During the summer of 2004, WJMF moved its studios from Hall 6 to its current location in the Koffler Technology Center.

During the winter of 2005-2006 WJMF went through an extensive equipment upgrade, with the addition of two new sound boards from Harris Communications, mic processing, delay system, remote broadcast capabilities, ENCO automation system and new outdoor speakers.

Bryant College has hosted WJMF's 20th, 30th and 40th birthday parties. At the 20th in 1992, Don Desfosse (general manager 1988-1991) returned with then-general manager Dave Kaplan on the main floor of the Bryant Center, with WJMF operating remotely from the site. At the 30th birthday party, in 2002, current station members took alumni on a tour of the station's facilities in Hall 6, followed by a formal dinner, dessert and coffee party in the Papitto Dining Room of the Bryant Center. The 40th Birthday Party was held on April 21, 2012, where alumni and family members were able to tour the station's facilities in the Koffler Center and Communications Complex, witness the unveiling of the On-Air Studio blue wall (which was dedicated to alumnus Stephen Boulter) and the WJMF History Wall, go online, and have a barbecue.

== Updates ==
Koffler Communication Complex went through an extensive equipment upgrade during the Winter of 2005-2006. With the addition of two new sound boards from Harris Communications, Mic Processing, Delay System, Remote Broadcast Capabilities, Online streaming, an ENCO Automation System, Outdoor Speakers and a fully redecorated office, production studio and on-air studio. WJMF now broadcasts in stereo.

In 2010, the radio station experienced more upgrades thanks to Bryant University's Special Initiatives Funding Program. The initiatives gave WJMF over $10,000 worth of new equipment including a digitized EAS System, Production Systems, RCS Music Scheduling Software and increased security. WJMF has another pending request for a full simulcasting system.

WJMF's last logo before its partnership with WGBH

The station was converted to a simulcast of Boston classical music station WCRB in August 2011, under a deal between Bryant University and the WGBH Educational Foundation. WJMF also boosted power from 225 watts to 1,200 watts (allowing for better coverage of Providence) and commenced HD Radio operations; WJMF's programming was transferred to a new HD2 channel, as well as a subchannel of WGBH-TV. Providence had been one of the largest markets without a full-time classical music station, particularly after WCRB moved from 102.5 to 99.5 MHz in 2006.

== Spring Stock ==
Spring Stock is one of two major annual events that WJMF holds. During Spring Weekend at Bryant, WJMF works closely with the Student Programming Board to create a day of events based on music and entertainments. WJMF's headliner was Zox and SPB's headliners were Everclear and Young Joc.

== Held Hostage ==
Held Hostage is a 36 hours DJing marathon where popular DJs spend the entire 36 hours in the station raising money for a non-profit organization of WJMF's choosing. In 2010 and 2011, the non-profit organization was the Rhode Island Community Food Bank.
