= WCRB =

- Lowell, Massachusetts; United States
- Broadcast area: Greater Boston
- Frequency: 99.5 MHz (HD Radio)
- Branding: CRB Classical 99.5

Programming
- Format: Classical

Ownership
- Owner: WGBH Educational Foundation
- Sister stations: Radio: WCAI; WGBH; WNAN; WZAI; TV: WFXZ-CD; WGBH-TV; WGBX-TV; WGBY-TV

History
- First air date: October 5, 1948 (license, as WLLH-FM); 1954 (WCRB-FM on 102.5; operated on AM since 1948)
- Former call signs: WLLH-FM (1948–1970); WSSH (1970–1987); WSSH-FM (1987–1995); WOAZ (1995–1997); WKLB-FM (1997–2006)
- Call sign meaning: Charles River Broadcasting, former owner of the previous WCRB on 102.5; backronym for the slogan "Classical Radio Boston"

Technical information
- Licensing authority: FCC
- Facility ID: 23441
- Class: B
- ERP: 27,000 watts
- HAAT: 199 meters (653 ft)
- Transmitter coordinates: 42°39′14.3″N 71°13′0.2″W
- Repeaters: 88.7 WJMF (Smithfield, Rhode Island); (89.7-2) WGBH-HD2 (Boston); (90.1-2) WCAI-HD2 (Woods Hole); (91.1-2) WNAN-HD2 (Nantucket); (94.3-2) WZAI-HD2 (Brewster)

Links
- Public license information: Public file; LMS
- Webcast: Listen live
- Website: www.classicalwcrb.org

WCRB (99.5 FM) is a non-commercial radio station licensed to Lowell, Massachusetts, which serves the Greater Boston area. It broadcasts classical music. Owned by the WGBH Educational Foundation, the station broadcasts from the organization’s studio complex in Brighton, and its transmitter is located west of Andover.

WCRB was a commercial station from the early 1950s to December 2009, when it was acquired by the WGBH Educational Foundation. Since then, the station has relied on the listener-supported method of funding, which dominates public radio stations in the United States: minor government funding is supplemented by tax-deductible gifts from individuals and by payments that corporations and other groups make.

WCRB programming is simulcast on the second HD Radio channel of WGBH, allowing WCRB to reach some portions of the Boston area that cannot receive 99.5, and on two other stations: WJMF, in Smithfield, Rhode Island, serving nearby Providence and the second HD Radio channel of WCAI, in Woods Hole.

== History of WCRB intellectual property ==
WCRB began broadcasting on 1330 kHz in Waltham on January 30, 1948. In 1950, the station was sold entirely to Theodore Jones, who would own the station under the name of Charles River Broadcasting until his death in 1991. Jones set up the Charles River Broadcast Trust to guarantee that his establishment would continue in perpetuity.

Around the time Jones acquired the station, WBMS, a daytime AM radio station that had played classical music, changed format. Jones decided to change WCRB's format from that of a typical suburban AM station of the era to full-time classical music. FM service at 102.5 MHz was added by 1954 upon the purchase of the WHAV FM transmitter. FM brought WCRB's classical music to parts of the Boston area that did not get good reception of WCRB's directional AM signal, and improved the quality of the sound.

In 1961, WCRB-FM became the first Boston-area station to broadcast in multiplex stereo; for a few years before that, WCRB had broadcast some of its programming in stereo by carrying one channel on AM, the other on FM. WCRB was directly involved in the development of FM multiplex stereo. Station WCRB and H. H. Scott, then of Maynard, Massachusetts, developed prototype stereophonic equipment that was used to prove the General Electric multiplex method being evaluated by the Federal Communications Commission (FCC). H. H. Scott was an early stereophonic-receiver manufacturer and developed and built high-quality home stereo equipment. Once the FCC approved stereo broadcasting, WCRB created a special "stereo" studio in downtown Boston, the first in the world. There was no dual channel (stereo) studio equipment at the time. Much of the equipment was handmade by the engineering staff.

WCRB is noted for many other innovations. It was the first radio station to obtain a permanent waiver of the FCC rules requiring average modulation in excess of eighty-five percent. This was necessary to preserve the dynamic range of the concert music broadcasts. The station also obtained a permanent waiver of the FCC rule that required a station identification announcement every thirty minutes. This meant that a live concert performance no longer had to be interrupted for station identification.

The WCRB engineering staff worked with the National Association of Broadcasters (NAB) to codify the RIAA LP record frequency-response curve, and create the NAB standard. Other technical innovations followed. Before the early days of FM stereo broadcasting, nobody had encountered the necessity of amplitude- and phase-matching two 15 kHz stereo leased lines. The telephone company called such a channel type "Program channel A". To them, as long as the frequency response and noise level matched their specifications, stereo simply meant that there would be two lines. It was just a matter of labeling them! Not so. WCRB engineering worked with AT&T to generate a specification involving matching both the phase and frequency response. This became the standard of the industry. Eventually, as stereo caught on across the country, these methods and specifications were used to install stereophonic leased lines to transmitters across the country, until they were made obsolete by the development of composite-signal studio-transmitter links. In the early days of radio, stations had full-time engineers on duty. Therefore, the WCRB engineering staff also recorded live performances for the Boston Symphony Orchestra Transcription Trust.

Although Charles River Broadcasting had acquired other radio stations, WCRB remained as the company's flagship station.

In 1975, WCRB ended simulcasting of WCRB-FM, changing callsigns to WHET, and its format to big-band/adult standards. In 1978, Charles River Broadcasting sold off WHET (later renamed WRCA), but retained WCRB, which became increasingly successful over the years as a 24/7 classical music station.

WCRB was under a long-term commitment by Charles River Broadcasting Trust, established by Theodore Jones, to continue to air classical music in perpetuity, and it carried no non-classical music programs. However, the decision to interpret the commitment as a request rather than a demand resulted in the announced sale of the station to Greater Media on December 19, 2005. The trustees of the Charles River Broadcast Trust had already sold off portions of the trust's property so that there was little physical property and real estate left. The AM transmitter site in Waltham was sold to a developer who built the Watermill Complex. This, and the sales of stations such as WCRQ in Providence, Rhode Island, marked the beginning of the gradual dissolution of the Theodore Jones trust. It was upon the death of Richard L. Kaye, an early manager, minority stockholder, and trusted associate of Jones, that the Charles River Trust would no longer maintain the commitments made by its founder.

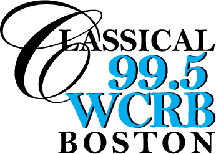
Logo under Nassau Broadcasting ownership, a similar logo was used during WCRB's later years on 102.5

Greater Media already owned five FM stations in the Boston market—the maximum allowed by the FCC and one of Greater Media's Boston stations would have to be sold before the company could acquire WCRB. Speculation arose that Greater Media would sell off 99.5 WKLB-FM, as its Andover transmitter location provided poor overall coverage of the Boston market, in contrast to the company's other stations. These thoughts were confirmed on July 31, 2006, when Greater Media announced that it would sell the physical property of WKLB-FM and the intellectual property of WCRB to Nassau Broadcasting, thus saving the commercial classical format for the Boston area, albeit on a station with poorer coverage of Boston. At the same time, Greater Media announced that the country format and intellectual property of WKLB would relocate to the prime signal of 102.5 MHz. WCRB's transition from 102.5 to 99.5 was completed on December 1, at noon local time. The first selection broadcast on the new frequency was the Hallelujah Chorus from Handel's Messiah.

Logo as "99.5 All Classical" from December 2009 to October 2011

Logo as "99.5 WCRB" used from October 2011 to August 2020

It was announced on September 21, 2009, that the WGBH Educational Foundation would acquire WCRB from Nassau and convert the station to non-commercial operation, complementing sister station WGBH. The sale was completed on December 1, 2009. Since assuming control of WCRB, WGBH has sought to expand the reach of the station, particularly to areas that had been served by the station prior to the frequency shift in 2006, WCRB's programming was added to WNCK, which formerly simulcast WGBH, concurrent with the sale's completion, and April 8, 2010, W242AA also switched from carrying WGBH to WCRB, via the 89.7 HD2 simulcast. WJMF began carrying WCRB programming in September 2011, since the frequency change in 2006, Providence had been one of the largest markets without access to a full-time classical music station. Because of this expanded reach, the station rebranded from 99.5 All Classical (the branding used since the sale to WGBH) to Classical New England on October 3, 2011. By 2015, the station was branded as "Classical Radio Boston, 99.5 WCRB". In 2020, the station announced it would rebrand as "CRB Classical 99.5", as part of a wider rebranding of WGBH and its stations to remove the letter "W".

== History of the 99.5 FM broadcast license ==
The 99.5 FM broadcast license began broadcasting October 6, 1948, as WLLH-FM, the FM counterpart to WLLH, programming a full-service format to the Merrimack Valley.

During the 1970s, 99.5 became WSSH (for Wish 99.5), which programmed a format of chiefly soft instrumental renditions of pop tunes with a few vocalists an hour, consisting of soft AC (adult contemporary) and standards cuts. In 1982, WSSH evolved to a soft AC format gradually eliminating the instrumental renditions, and became home to popular nighttime radio personality Delilah Rene before she became nationally syndicated. Ratings were very high through the 1980s and WSSH often led other AC stations. By then, the station was separated from WLLH, but later gained a sister station on 1510 AM (now WMEX). WSSH had high ratings and was often the top-rated adult contemporary radio station in the market throughout the 1980s.

However, in the early 1990s, ratings went from excellent to mediocre; part of the reason was the perception that WSSH was still an elevator music station. By 1991, the station modified its format to mainstream AC by adding current product and some up-tempo AC tunes. WSSH became the third place radio station, following WMJX and WVBF (now known as WROR, which subsequently became a sister station to 99.5). On December 13, 1995, the owner of WSSH, Granum Communications, changed the format to smooth jazz as WOAZ (99.5 The Oasis), mirroring Granum's KOAI in Dallas.

Then, in 1997, Granum sold WOAZ and WBOS to Greater Media, which already owned WMJX, WKLB-FM and WROR (the former WVBF). On August 22 of that year, Greater Media swapped the frequencies of WOAZ and WKLB in a move where the format and personalities of WOAZ moved to 96.9 (adopting the call sign WSJZ), while WKLB moved to 99.5 and became Country 99.5 WKLB, where it stayed until December 1, 2006. Greater Media noted that the move was made because the 99.5 signal is stronger than that of 96.9 in Essex County, home to many country music listeners.

The 99.5 frequency was spun off to Nassau Broadcasting Partners as a consequence of a deal where Greater Media acquired WCRB's current frequency, with 102.5 adopting the WKLB format and call sign. Nassau also acquired WCRB's call letters and programming. Nassau already owned WBACH, a network of four classical-formatted stations in Maine affiliated with WCRB's World Classical Network. The two stations switched frequencies at noon on December 1, 2006. The last broadcast by WKLB on 99.5 was of the Star Spangled Banner as performed by country band Ricochet. The first song played by WKLB at 102.5 was "Life Is A Highway" by Rascal Flatts. The last air personality on 99.5, and consequently the first live voice on 102.5, was longtime midday host Carolyn Kruse. A redesigned website was launched immediately after the frequency change.

== Audience ==
WCRB claimed to have about 500,000 listeners who tune into the live Boston Symphony Orchestra broadcasts and the station's other programming, a longtime claim by management. According to Arbitron, the Metropolitan Boston market contains 3.8 million individuals 12 years of age or older. An FM station of WCRB's power transmitting on 102.5 MHz could reach parts of Worcester, Massachusetts; Providence, Rhode Island; and Southeastern New Hampshire. One could reasonably assume that such coverage adds one-half million individuals, for a total of 4.3 million. If the WCRB programming did in fact reach half a million people, it would generate a rating of close to 12 per cent of the market. The most popular radio programs on Boston radio stations are heard in morning and afternoon drive on weekdays and do not reach as many listeners as WCRB claimed. These numbers predate the move to 99.5 MHz and the switch to a non-commercial format. As of 2012, the station enjoyed a 2.0 share, which added up to 252,400 listeners.

== Community and innovation ==
WCRB engineers worked with Bell Telephone to develop frequency and phase matching technology for using pairs of 15 kHz leased lines throughout the country to carry stereo signals for studio to transmitter links and improved geographical coverage of broadcast signals (leased-line technology has since been replaced by microwave links, satellite feeds, and high-quality transmission using the Internet).

They were also at the center of the development of modern multiplexed FM stereo technology and its approval by the FCC, in cooperation with FM receiver manufacturer H. H. Scott, Inc.

== Translators ==
WCRB was formerly carried on a separately-owned translator in Manchester, New Hampshire, W295BL (106.9); this ended after the translator was sold by Basic Holdings to Saga Communications in September 2019. In January 2020, W295BL began carrying the third HD Radio channel of Saga-owned WZID.

WCRB was also carried on translator W242AA (96.3) in Beacon Hill, Massachusetts, until the translator's license was surrendered and cancelled on October 11, 2022.
