= Innovation Hub (radio program) =

- Running time: 1 hour
- Country of origin: United States
- Language: English
- Home station: WGBH
- Syndicates: Public Radio Exchange
- Starring: Kara Miller
- Recording studio: Boston, Massachusetts
- Website: innovationhub.org

Innovation Hub is a United States–based, syndicated public radio program produced by WGBH and distributed by Public Radio Exchange. The weekly, hour-long show is hosted by Kara Miller and covers education, technology, culture, sustainable living, and business.

== Coverage ==
Innovation Hub was launched at Boston's WGBH in 2011 and began national syndication in May 2014. It is currently carried by more than 100 public radio stations, including WNYC, WBEZ, KUHF, WCPN and its home station, WGBH.

== Host ==
Kara Miller is the host and executive editor of Innovation Hub, which she launched in 2011. Kara has also appeared on “The Takeaway,” “PRI's The World,” and “Marketplace Tech."

Her writing has appeared in The Boston Globe, The National Journal, TheAtlantic.com, The Huffington Post, and The International Herald Tribune. Kara holds a Ph.D. from Tufts and a B.A. from Yale. She serves on the advisory committee of the Lemelson Foundation.

== Guests ==
Past guests on the program have included Michael Pollan, Marissa Mayer, Walter Isaacson, and Sherry Turkle.
