= Chris Rohmann =

American singer-songwriter

Chris Rohmann is the former host of As Schools Match Wits on WGBY-TV channel 57 in Springfield, Massachusetts.

Rohmann was born in Yellow Springs, Ohio. He is a resident of Hadley, Massachusetts, but lived in the United Kingdom for many years until the early/mid 1980s. He wrote the novelty song "Funky Moped", covered by comedian Jasper Carrott, whose version made it to number five in the British charts in the 1970s.

He was a regular performer on the folk club circuit in the UK and also enjoyed success at the Edinburgh Festival Fringe before returning to the United States.

Rohmann has been an actor, director, singer, songwriter, writer, and radio commentator as well as a member of the adjunct faculty of the Pioneer Valley Performing Arts High School (PVPA). He has written theater criticism and commentary for the Valley Advocate (Newspapers of New England Inc.) and the Daily Hampshire Gazette (also owned by Newspapers of New England Inc.).

As a director for Hampshire Shakespeare Company, Rohmann was given responsibility for staging A Midsummer Night's Dream in 2005 and Macbeth in 2006.
