= Channel 44 virtual TV stations in the United States =

The following television stations operate on virtual channel 44 in the United States:

- K24MI-D in Redding, California
- K31PO-D in Des Moines, Iowa
- K33QG-D in Cortez, etc., Colorado
- K44GH-D in Alexandria, Minnesota
- KCYM-LD in Des Moines, Iowa
- KBVK-LD in Spencer, Iowa
- KDNF-LD in Arvada, Colorado
- KFDF-CD in Fort Smith, Arkansas
- KFFV in Seattle, Washington
- KHPF-CD in Fredericksburg, Texas
- KLEG-CD in Dallas, Texas
- KLUJ-TV in Harlingen, Texas
- KPHE-LD in Phoenix, Arizona
- KPTH in Sioux City, Iowa
- KPTP-LD in Norfolk, Nebraska
- KPYX in San Francisco, California
- KRJR-LD in Sacramento, California
- KTPX-TV in Okmulgee, Oklahoma
- KWBN in Honolulu, Hawaii
- KWKT-TV in Waco, Texas
- KXLA in Rancho Palos Verdes, California
- W06DK-D in Florence, South Carolina
- W10DD-D in San Juan, Puerto Rico
- W15DO-D in Norfolk, Virginia
- W17EB-D in Columbus, Ohio
- W20CP-D in Mansfield, Pennsylvania
- W20EI-D in Towanda, Pennsylvania
- W26DP-D in Inverness, Florida
- W29EU-D in Clarks Summit, etc., Pennsylvania
- W30ED-D in Guayama, Puerto Rico
- W31DC-D in Fort Pierce, Florida
- W33EL-D in Caguas, Puerto Rico
- W36FJ-D in Sebring, Florida
- WAGV in Harlan, Kentucky
- WEVV-TV in Evansville, Indiana
- WFFF-TV in Burlington, Vermont
- WGBX-TV in Boston, Massachusetts
- WGMB-TV in Baton Rouge, Louisiana
- WJFB in Lebanon, Tennessee
- WJTC in Pensacola, Florida
- WLMA in Lima, Ohio
- WMCN-TV in Atlantic City, New Jersey
- WNHO-LD in Defiance, Ohio
- WOHW-LD in Lima, Ohio
- WOUC-TV in Cambridge, Ohio
- WPXH-TV in Hoover, Alabama
- WSNS-TV in Chicago, Illinois
- WSWG in Valdosta, Georgia
- WTLW-LD in Lima, Ohio
- WTOG in St. Petersburg, Florida
- WVIA-TV in Scranton, Pennsylvania
- WYBE-CD in Pinehurst, North Carolina
- WZDC-CD in Washington, D.C.

The following stations, which are no longer licensed, formerly operated on virtual channel 44 in the United States:

- K21NJ-D in Three Forks, Montana
- K31MX-D in Plainview, Texas
- K44KR-D in Salinas, California
- K44LG-D in Anderson/Pineville, Missouri
- KIDT-LD in Stamford, Texas
- KYAM-LD in Hereford, Texas
- W44CT-D in Albany, New York
- W44CU-D in Florence, South Carolina
- W44CV-D in Utuado, Puerto Rico
- W44DK-D in Clarksburg, West Virginia
- WLPH-CD in Miami, Florida
- WMKH-LD in Hilton Head Island, South Carolina
- WNDS-LD in Ocala, Florida
