= Rohrmann =

Rohrmann is a German surname. Notable people with the surname include:

- Heike Rohrmann (born 1969), East German female shot putter
- Petra Rohrmann (born 1962), East German cross-country skier

== See also ==
- Jeff Rohrman, American soccer player and coach
