= WGBX-TV =

Television station in Boston

- Boston, Massachusetts; United States
- Channels: Digital: 32 (UHF), shared with WBTS-CD; Virtual: 44
- Branding: GBH 44

Programming
- Affiliations: 2.3/44.2: PBS; for others, see § Technical information and subchannels

Ownership
- Owner: WGBH Educational Foundation
- Sister stations: TV: WFXZ-CD; WGBH-TV; WGBY-TV; Radio: WCAI • WZAI • WNAN; WCRB; WGBH

History
- First air date: September 25, 1967
- Former channel numbers: Analog: 44 (UHF, 1967–2009); Digital: 43 (UHF, 2003–2019)
- Former affiliations: NET (1967–1970)
- Call sign meaning: Brand extension of WGBH-TV

Technical information
- Licensing authority: FCC
- Facility ID: 72098
- ERP: 922 kW
- HAAT: 388.3 m (1,274.0 ft)
- Transmitter coordinates: 42°18′37″N 71°14′12″W

Links
- Public license information: Public file; LMS
- Website: www.wgbh.org

WGBX-TV (channel 44), branded as GBH 44, is the secondary PBS member television station in Boston, Massachusetts, United States. It is owned by the WGBH Educational Foundation alongside WGBH-TV (channel 2) and originates from studios on Guest Street in northwest Boston's Brighton neighborhood. WGBX-TV's transmitter is located on Cedar Street (southwest of I-95/MA 128) in Needham, Massachusetts.

WGBX-TV began broadcasting in September 1967 as a source of experimental, alternative, and additional educational programming, in addition to repeats of shows aired by WGBH-TV. It also provided an outlet for specialty telecourses and instructional material. In the 1960s and 1970s, such programs as The Most Dangerous Game, Catch 44, and Club 44 attracted national attention or moved to the parent station. WGBX-TV provided the first gavel-to-gavel telecast of an American state legislature in 1984 when the Massachusetts House of Representatives agreed to have their sessions televised in full, and it was a test bed for experimentation with new digital audio standards in the late 1980s. In the 1990s, WGBX-TV programming was revamped to feature themed nights and increase awareness of its identity.

WGBX-TV itself broadcasts standard-definition versions of WGBX and WGBH (both in high definition from the WGBH-TV multiplex) and several multicast services. WBTS-CD, NBC10 Boston, shares the channel, allowing the station to broadcast at high power to the Boston area.

== History ==
=== Early years ===
Channel 44 had originally been allotted to Boston as a commercial television channel. Two companies, Integrated Communications Systems and United Artists Broadcasting, had each applied for the channel in 1963. They were soon joined by the WGBH Educational Foundation, which proposed a non-commercial educational station. All three applications were designated for comparative hearing in February 1964, but that July, the Federal Communications Commission (FCC) reserved channel 44 for educational use in Boston and transferred channel 25 from Barnstable to serve as a new commercial channel. The two commercial applicants then switched their proposals to channel 25, leaving WGBH alone in its channel 44 application and allowing the FCC to award the construction permit in October.

The Department of Health, Education, and Welfare awarded a $725,000 grant for the construction of WGBX-TV in January 1966; the station was projected to provide specialized educational programming. WGBX-TV began broadcasting on September 25, 1967, two weeks after the station aired its first test pattern.

In addition to replays and additional PBS programs as well as college telecourses, WGBX has offered a wide range of experimental programs and services in its history. The very first program broadcast by the station was a teacher in-service program designed to help first-grade instructors teach drama. On The Most Dangerous Game, an audience participation program telecast in 1967, viewers could call a telephone number to control the movement of a fictional country, Transania, in a hypothetical foreign policy crisis. A monthly series on the intersection of law enforcement and critical justice was distributed to other educational stations. In 1968, WGBX-TV and WBZ-TV broadcast Read Your Way Up: A TV Read-In, an adult literacy program. In November 1970, the station debuted a public-access show, Catch 44. The program attracted widespread national and international interest; other public stations copied the format, as did the BBC, which launched Open Door in 1973. In 1973, as part of an initiative by the WGBH Educational Foundation, it and nine other public stations in northeastern cities began airing an open-captioned version of the ABC Evening News.

WGBX began airing live, gavel-to-gavel (beginning to end) coverage of the Massachusetts House of Representatives in 1984, making it the first state legislative chamber to have full, unedited proceedings televised. The Massachusetts State Senate joined the House on WGBX in 1994. Legislative coverage on channel 44 continued through 2006; the contracts with each chamber were not renewed for 2007.

Beginning in 1986 and continuing through at least 1988, with special FCC permission, it was the only station in the United States authorized to broadcast pulse-code modulation (PCM) digital audio on its video signal; the audio programs, primarily simulcasts of WGBH-FM aired overnight but also including specially recorded concerts, could then be decoded from the video tape by residents with the appropriate decoder equipment.

In 1987, weekend programming on WGBX was expanded to add 18 additional hours, primarily replays of programs aired by WGBH, as part of celebrations for the 20th anniversary of channel 44. However, brand recognition of WGBX remained low, and people perceived it as primarily airing repeats of WGBH programming. In January 1995, WGBH relaunched WGBX under the brand GBH44 to bring it closer to the main station. It increased emphasis on independent and offbeat programming, including the use of themed nights, though it continued to air shows that had to be moved off the channel 2 schedule and to air the main WGBH lineup during the station's annual auction. By 1997, WGBX-TV was the 26th-most-watched public television station in prime time, demonstrating that the changes had given channel 44 an identity and increased recognition.

=== Digital television transition ===
WGBX-TV's logo prior to 2010. This logo is based on the sister station's secondary logo.

In 1999, the tower used by WGBX-TV in Needham, owned by WBZ-TV, was overhauled to support digital broadcasting for its tenants, including WBZ, WGBH and WGBX, and WCVB-TV. The work included removing the top 300 feet (91 m) and replacing it with a new 400-foot (120 m) section and the installation of new equipment. However, WGBX-TV did not begin digital broadcasts on its own channel until January 1, 2003.

WGBX-TV shut down its analog signal, over UHF channel 44, on April 23, 2009. The WGBH Educational Foundation had previously warned that defective equipment might force the station to close prior to the June transition date. The station's digital signal continued to be broadcast on its pre-transition UHF channel 43, using virtual channel 44.

On January 16, 2017, WGBX switched its fourth subchannel from a locally programmed loop of children's programming to the relaunched national PBS Kids channel.

=== Repack and channel share ===
On January 18, 2018, WGBX began a channel share with Nashua, New Hampshire–licensed WYCN-CD (channel 15, now WBTS-CD), which was acquired by the NBC Owned Television Stations subsidiary of NBCUniversal. Though WBTS-CD is a Class A low-power station, it is broadcast by a full-power station. WYCN-CD had been a "zombie station" — a license without a transmitter — after selling its spectrum in the 2016 United States wireless spectrum auction. Moving WYCN-CD to the WGBX multiplex gave NBC10 Boston full-market coverage.

== Technical information and subchannels ==
WGBX-TV and WBTS-CD transmit using WGBX-TV's spectrum from a tower on Cedar Street in Needham, Massachusetts. The stations' signals are multiplexed:

Subchannels of WGBX-TV and WBTS-CD
License	Subchannel	Res.	Short name	Programming
WGBX-TV	2.2	480i	World	World
WGBX-TV	2.3	480i	WGBH-SD	PBS (WGBH-TV)
WGBX-TV	44.2	480i	WGBX-SD	PBS
WGBX-TV	44.3	480i	Create	Create
WGBX-TV	44.4	480i	Kids	PBS Kids
WBTS-CD	15.1	1080i	WBTS-CD	NBC
WBTS-CD	15.2	480i	Cozi	Cozi TV

Simulcast of subchannels of another station

There is no channel 44.1 on the WGBX-TV multiplex, as it is broadcast by WGBH-TV.

== See also ==
- Channel 32 digital TV stations in the United States
- Channel 44 virtual TV stations in the United States
- List of television stations in Massachusetts
- List of United States stations available in Canada
