= WAZK =

- Nantucket, Massachusetts; United States
- Broadcast area: Nantucket
- Frequency: 97.7 MHz
- Branding: 97.7 ACK-FM

Programming
- Format: Adult album alternative

Ownership
- Owner: Nantucket Radio, LLC

History
- First air date: May 24, 2012

Technical information
- Licensing authority: FCC
- Facility ID: 189510
- Class: A
- ERP: 1,750 watts
- HAAT: 72 meters (236 ft)
- Transmitter coordinates: 41°17′6″N 70°8′23″W

Links
- Public license information: Public file; LMS
- Webcast: Listen live
- Website: www.ackfm.com

WAZK (97.7 FM) is an adult album alternative formatted station licensed to Nantucket, Massachusetts. The station is owned by Nantucket Radio, LLC. WAZK first signed on at 5 p.m. on May 24, 2012. The first song played on the station was "Hurricane" by Bob Dylan.
