= New England Public Media =

Public broadcasting organization in Western Massachusetts

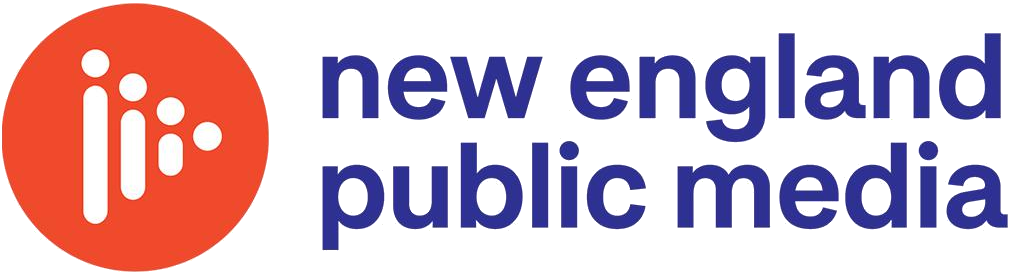
- Established: April 11, 2019; 7 years ago
- Founders: Martin Miller; Anthony Hayes
- Founded at: Springfield, Massachusetts, United States
- Type: Nonprofit
- Headquarters: 44 Hampden Street, Springfield, Massachusetts, U.S.
- Region served: Western Massachusetts
- Fields: Public broadcasting
- President and CEO: Martin Miller
- General manager and COO: Anthony Hayes
- Affiliations: PBS; NPR; PRX; APM; APT; National Educational Telecommunications Association
- Staff: 78 employees
- Website: nepm.org

New England Public Media is a non-profit organization that operates the public broadcasting outlets in Western Massachusetts, including the Springfield area. It operates the region's NPR member, Amherst-licensed WFCR (New England Public Radio) and its associated satellites, and the region's PBS member, Springfield-licensed WGBY-TV.

The formation of New England Public Media was announced on April 11, 2019, by Martin Miller, CEO of WFCR, and Anthony Hayes, general manager of WGBY. WFCR, owned by the University of Massachusetts Amherst, and WGBY, owned by the WGBH Educational Foundation, had been exploring ways to collaborate since 2017. Hayes and Miller felt joining forces would expand their local journalism efforts. Miller said that many people in the area already believed WFCR and WGBY were linked, despite having had separate owners for decades. New England Public Media officially took control of the stations in the summer of 2019.

New England Public Media is led by a board comprising members of WFCR's fundraising arm, the New England Public Radio Foundation, and WGBY's board of tribunes. Miller is president and CEO, while Hayes is chief operating officer and general manager. The merged organization operates WFCR and WGBY under program service operating agreements with UMass Amherst and the WGBH Foundation, which retain the licenses for WFCR and WGBY, respectively. The NEPR Foundation retains operation of the "NEPR News Network," which runs an expanded schedule of NPR news programming. The merged organization has 78 employees, including a 21-member newsroom; it intends to increase its newsroom to 30 journalists by 2022.
