= WGBH-TV =

Television station in Boston

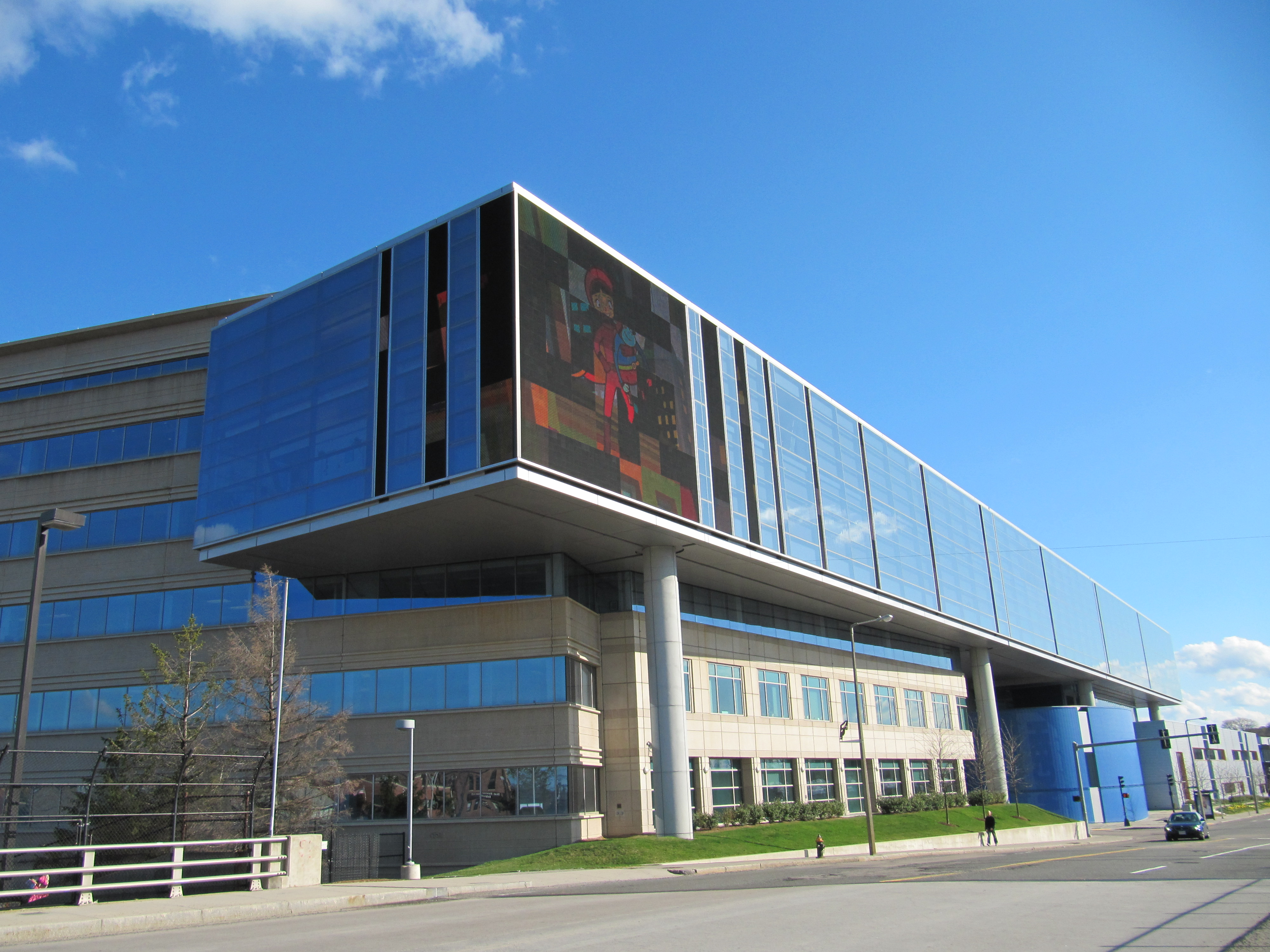
- WGBH Guest Street studios (with "digital mural" LED screen)
- Boston, Massachusetts; United States
- Channels: Digital: 5 (VHF), shared with WFXZ-CD; Virtual: 2
- Branding: GBH 2

Programming
- Affiliations: 2.1/44.1: PBS

Ownership
- Owner: WGBH Educational Foundation
- Sister stations: TV: WFXZ-CD; WGBX-TV; WGBY-TV; Radio: WGBH (FM); WCAI · WZAI · WNAN; WCRB

History
- First air date: May 2, 1955
- Former channel numbers: Analog: 2 (VHF, 1955–2009); Digital: 19 (UHF, 2002–2019)
- Former affiliations: NET (1955–1970)
- Call sign meaning: Great Blue Hill (original location of transmitter)

Technical information
- Licensing authority: FCC
- Facility ID: 72099
- ERP: 34 kW
- HAAT: 362.7 m (1,190.0 ft)
- Transmitter coordinates: 42°18′10.7″N 71°13′4.9″W

Links
- Public license information: Public file; LMS
- Website: www.wgbh.org

WGBH-TV (channel 2), branded as GBH 2, is a PBS member television station in Boston, Massachusetts, United States. It is the flagship namesake property of the WGBH Educational Foundation, which also owns Boston's secondary PBS member WGBX-TV (channel 44) and Springfield, Massachusetts PBS member WGBY-TV (channel 57, operated by New England Public Media), Class A Biz TV affiliate WFXZ-CD (channel 24) and public radio stations WGBH (89.7 FM) and WCRB (99.5 FM) in the Boston area, and WCAI radio (and satellites WZAI and WNAN) on Cape Cod.

WGBH-TV, WGBX-TV, and the WGBH and WCRB radio stations share studios on Guest Street in northwest Boston's Brighton neighborhood; WGBH-TV's transmitter is located on Cabot Street (east of I-95/MA 128) in Needham, Massachusetts, on the former candelabra tower, which is shared with Fox affiliate WFXT and serves as a full power backup facility for sister station WGBX-TV as well as CBS owned-and-operated station (O&O) WBZ-TV, ABC affiliate WCVB-TV, NBC O&O WBTS-CD (which itself shares spectrum with WGBX), and independent station WSBK-TV.

WGBH is a prominent distributor and producer of national PBS programming, with some of its most notable programs having included American Experience, The French Chef, Frontline, Masterpiece, Nova, and The Victory Garden.

== History ==
=== Organization and first broadcasts (1951–1955) ===
The WGBH Educational Foundation received its first broadcast license for radio in April 1951 under the auspices of the Lowell Institute Cooperative Broadcasting Council, a consortium of local universities and cultural institutions, whose collaboration stems from an 1836 bequest by textile manufacturer John Lowell, Jr. that called for free public lectures for the citizens of Boston. WGBH (89.7 FM) first signed on the air on October 6, 1951, with a live broadcast of a performance by the Boston Symphony Orchestra.

The Federal Communications Commission (FCC) originally awarded a construction permit to Waltham-based electronics company Raytheon to build a television station that would transmit on VHF channel 2 in Boston. Raytheon planned to launch a commercial television station using the call letters WRTB-TV (for "Raytheon Television Broadcasting"). However, after some setbacks and the cancellation of the construction permit license, WRTB never made it on the air, paving the way for the FCC to allocate channel 2 for non-commercial educational use. WGBH subsequently applied for and received a license to operate on that channel. The WGBH Educational Foundation obtained initial start-up funds for WGBH-TV from the Lincoln and Therese Filene Foundation.

The station's callsign refers to Great Blue Hill (the highest point in the Boston area at an elevation of 635 feet (194 m)), a location in Milton that served as the original location of WGBH-TV's transmitter facility and where the transmitter for WGBH radio continues to operate to this day. (Note: The callsign is occasionally jokingly referred as "God Bless Harvard", although the station's connections with the university are at best indirect; Harvard was one of several Boston-area universities which took part in the Lowell Institute Cooperative Broadcasting Council and rented space to WGBH on Western Avenue in Allston for the station's studio operations.)

WGBH-TV first signed on the air at 5:20 pm on May 2, 1955, becoming the first public television station in Boston and the first non-commercial television station to sign on in New England. The first program to air on the station was Come and See, a children's program hosted by Tony Saletan and Mary Lou Adams, which was filmed at Tufts Nursery Training School. Channel 2 originally served as a member station of the National Educational Television and Radio Center (NETRC), which evolved into National Educational Television (NET) in 1963; for its first few years on the air, channel 2 only broadcast on Monday through Fridays between 5:30 and 9 p.m.

=== First studios near MIT (1956–1961) ===
For the first six years, operations were based out of studio facilities located at 84 Massachusetts Avenue in Cambridge, Massachusetts, directly across from the Rogers Building main entrance to MIT. The first television studios were located in second-floor space which originally had housed a roller skating rink. The uneven and rippled maple floors caused difficulties moving the heavy TV cameras, and loud creaking noises plagued the sound engineers.

In 1957, Hartford N. Gunn Jr. was appointed general manager of WGBH; he would later earn the Corporation for Public Broadcasting's Ralph Lowell Award for his achievements in programming development. Under Gunn, who would serve until February 1970, WGBH made significant investments in technology and programming to improve the station's profile, and set out to become a major producer of public television.

In February 1957, WGBH expanded its programming to weekends for the first time, adding a four-hour schedule on Sunday afternoons from 2:30 to 6:30 p.m. (its sign-on time on Sundays was later extended to 11 a.m. that May). In March 1958, channel 2 began offering academic instructional television programs, with the debut of eight weekly science programs aimed at students in the sixth grade, which were televised "in some 48 separate school systems in and around the Boston area". In November of that year, the station installed a new full-power transmitter donated by Westinghouse, which increased channel 2's transmitting power to 100,000 watts.

=== Fire and recovery (1961–1969) ===
During the early morning hours of October 14, 1961, a large fire devastated the Cambridge studios of WGBH-TV and WGBH radio. WGBH was only off the air for one day after the fire. Before the conflagration, WGBH had purchased a used Greyhound bus, and had begun refitting it as a mobile TV studio. It was parked behind the 84 Massachusetts Avenue building but somehow survived the disaster, and became a vital temporary facility for continued operations. A closedown from the station within the early 1960s acknowledging this incident was presumed lost and was initially believed to be a hoax, but the footage has been partially recovered as of December 25, 2025.

Until the WGBH Educational Foundation was able to build a new studio complex to replace the destroyed former building, the two stations arranged to operate from temporary offices, and had to produce their local programming from the studio facilities of various television stations in the Boston area and southern New Hampshire. WGBH-TV maintained a splintered operation, basing its master control operations at Newman Catholic Center at Boston University, production facilities (for which it was reserved to use late nights and on weekends) at the studios of then CBS affiliate WHDH-TV (channel 5, now defunct; allocation as of March 1972 operated by ABC affiliate WCVB-TV) on Morrissey Boulevard in Boston's Dorchester section, and its film and tape library (including those which were salvaged from the fire) was housed at the studios of fellow NET station WENH-TV (channel 11) in Durham, New Hampshire.

Several area universities also chipped in to temporarily house other operations displaced by the fire: WGBH's scenic department was relocated to Northeastern University, its arts department was set up on the Boston University campus, and programming and production offices were based in Cambridge's Kendall Square neighborhood. WHDH, NBC affiliate WBZ-TV (channel 4, as of January 1995 a CBS owned-and-operated station) and ABC affiliate WNAC-TV (channel 7, now defunct; allocation now occupied by independent station WHDH that is unrelated to the above-mentioned WHDH-TV, which its channel is now used by WCVB-TV) also provided technical and production assistance to the WGBH television and radio stations until a permanent facility was built to reintegrate the stations' operations.

On August 29, 1963, WGBH-TV and WGBH radio both began operating from a new studio facility for the stations that was built at 125 Western Avenue in Boston's Allston neighborhood (the post office box address that the station adopted at that time – P.O. Box 350, Boston, MA 02134 – would become associated with a jingle used on the WGBH-produced children's program, ZOOM, both in its 1972 and 1999 adaptations, exhorting viewers to send in ideas for use on the show).

On June 18, 1966, WGBH-TV relocated its transmitter to a broadcast tower in Needham, Massachusetts, The following year on September 25, 1967, WGBH-TV gained a sister television station in the Boston area, WGBX-TV (channel 44), which has transmitted its signal from the Needham site since the station signed on. WGBX's digital signal on UHF channel 32 shares the master antenna at the very top of the tower with several commercial stations in the market, while WGBH-TV's channel 5 digital transmitter operates from a different tower on Cabot St, also in Needham.

The launch of WGBX was one facet of a plan developed by the WGBH Educational Foundation in the late 1960s to operate a network of six non-commercial television stations around Massachusetts. However, these plans never materialized in their intended form; besides WGBX, the only other station that ultimately made it on the air was WGBY (channel 57) in Springfield, which launched in 1971. Three additional WGBH-owned stations were to have launched, all of which were slated to use the letters "WGB" for the first three letters in their callsigns; these included WGBW, which was to broadcast on channel 35 in Adams (the "W" in its callsign was to stand for "West"; the callsign has since been reassigned to a radio station in Two Rivers, Wisconsin), along with two stations in New Bedford and Worcester.

On the night of April 5, 1968, WGBH-TV (at roughly three hours' notice) broadcast a James Brown concert from the Boston Garden, the night after Martin Luther King Jr. was assassinated. Boston Mayor Kevin White, who was worried that the concert would set off a riot, and certain that cancellation would be worse, contacted WGBH to air the concert on TV, and told the public to stay home and watch, helping prevent boycotts in the region. The concert would later be seen numerous times in the following days, helping the Boston area stay in peace.

=== PBS membership and expansion (1970–2006) ===
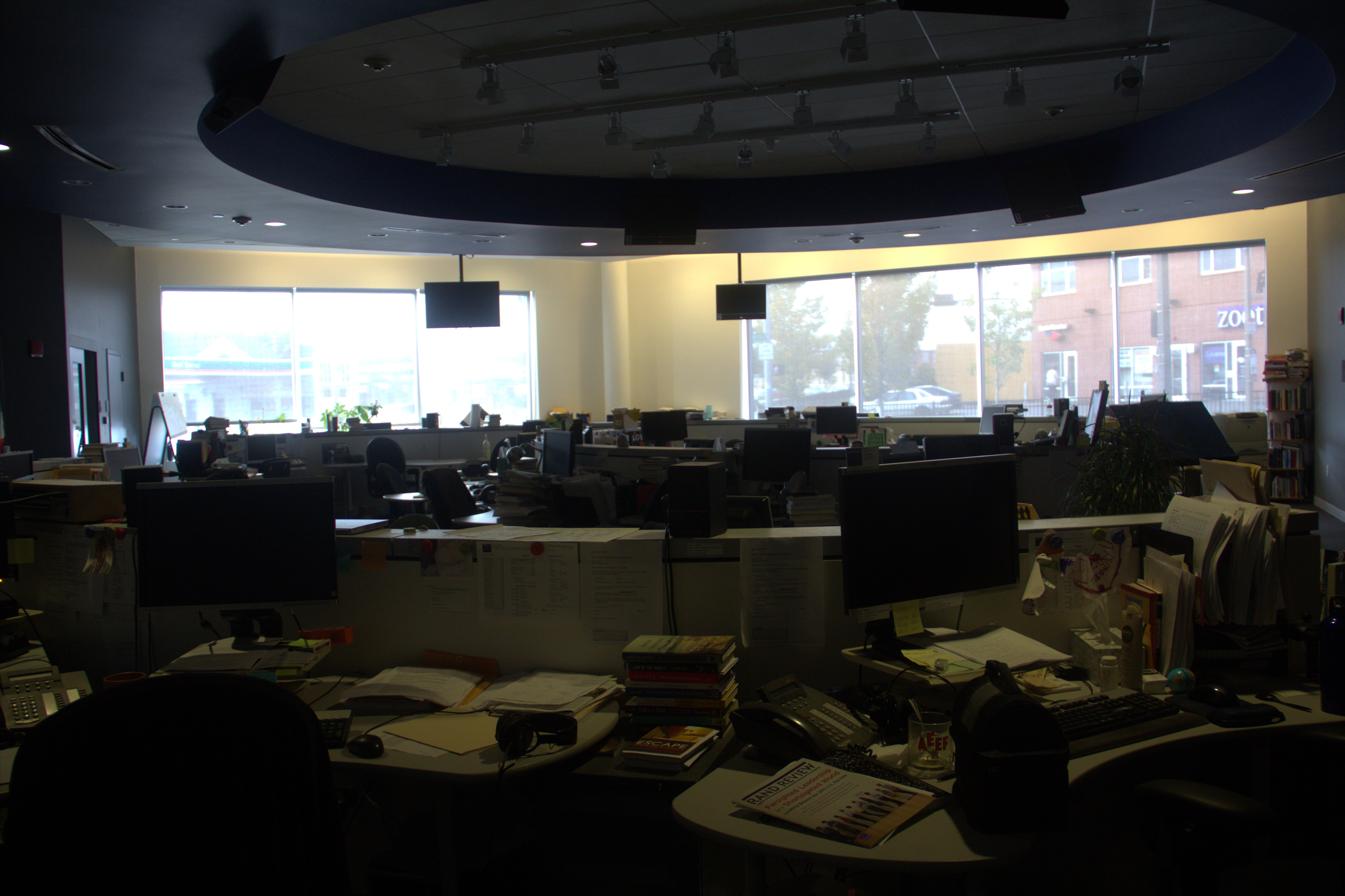
WGBH newsroom

In 1970, longtime WGBH general manager Hartford N. Gunn Jr. resigned, to become founding President of the Public Broadcasting Service (PBS). This new organization was launched as an independent entity to supersede NET (which itself was integrated into its Newark, New Jersey outlet, WNDT (now WNET), per request by the Corporation for Public Broadcasting) and assumed many of the functions of its predecessor network. WGBH itself joined the new network. Over time, WGBH became a pioneer in public television, producing many programs that were seen on NET and later, PBS, that either originated at the station's studio facilities or were otherwise produced by channel 2.

On October 31, 2003, WGBH launched Boston Kids & Family TV, a PBS Kids Channel-affiliated local cable service that was developed in partnership with the City of Boston. Available to Comcast and RCN subscribers, the service took over channel space previously occupied by one of the city's cable access channels, which carried a mix of public affairs programs, footage of city-sponsored events, and mayoral press conferences (some of the aforementioned content was moved to the city-managed Educational Channel). Boston Kids & Family carried a mix of children's programs produced by WGBH and other distributors—which were scheduled to avoid simulcasts with WGBH-TV or WGBX-TV—daily from 7 a.m. to 8 p.m., and a repeating block of telecourse programs aimed at adults from 8 p.m. to 7 a.m. The channel intended to affiliate the subchannel with the planned PBS Kids Go! network, which was scheduled to launch in October 2006; however, PBS scuttled plans to launch the Kids Go! network prior to its launch (opting only to launch the brand as an afternoon-only sub-block within PBS's existing children's program lineup). After PBS Kids ceased network operations, Boston Kids & Family was replaced by The Municipal Channel, which carried much of the programming offered by the service prior to the WGBH partnership.

As WGBH's operations grew, the 125 Western Avenue building proved inadequate to support it and its sister stations; some administrative operations were moved across the street to 114 Western Avenue, with an overhead pedestrian bridge connecting the two buildings. By 2005, WGBH had facilities in more than a dozen buildings in the Allston area. The station's need for more studio space dovetailed with Harvard Business School's desire to expand its adjacent campus; Harvard already owned the land on which the WGBH studios were located, which the university had donated to WGBH for use to construct the Western Avenue facility in 1962 at a value of $250,000.

=== New studios in Brighton and Back Bay (2007–present) ===
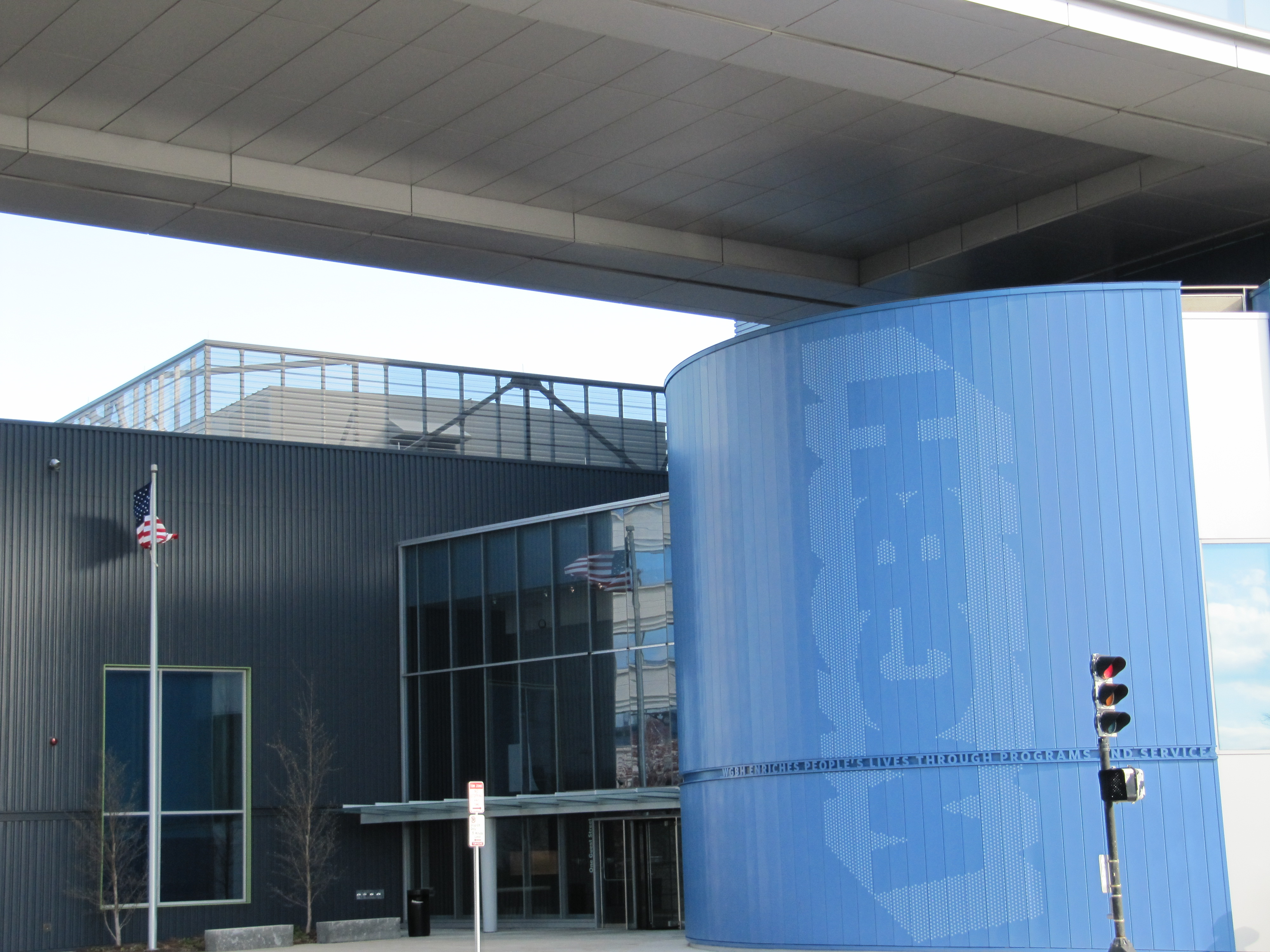
Guest Street entrance to the WGBH studios

WGBH built a new studio and headquarters complex, designed by James Polshek & Partners, in the nearby Brighton neighborhood of Boston. The building, inaugurated in June 2007, spans the block of Market Street from Guest Street to North Beacon Street (1 Guest Street, where the lobby entrance of the new studio building is located, is the building's postal address), with radio studios facing pedestrian traffic on Market Street. The outside of the building carries a 30-by-45-foot (9.1 m × 13.7 m) "digital mural" LED screen, which displays a different image each day to automotive and rail commuters along the nearby Massachusetts Turnpike.

Television and radio programs continued to be recorded at the Western Avenue studios until the WGBH stations completed the migration of their operations into the new facility in September 2007. The old Western Avenue studios were renovated by Harvard University in 2011 to house the Harvard Innovation Lab.

WGBH-TV ended regular programming on its analog signal, over VHF channel 2, on June 12, 2009, the official date on which full-power television stations in the United States transitioned from analog to digital broadcasts under federal mandate. The station's digital signal remained on its pre-transition UHF channel 19, using virtual channel 2. The FCC allowed WGBH-TV to run a DTV nightlight service until June 26, 2009. The DTV nightlight program consisted of an episode of This Old House which provided information regarding the digital television transition, which looped until the analog signal was turned off. However, the nightlight service had actually continued to run until around 12:07 a.m. on July 13, 2009, when its analog signal was turned off permanently.

In 2016, WGBH opened a new remote television and radio studio on the first floor of the newly renovated Johnson Building of the Boston Public Library, located in the Back Bay neighborhood of Boston. The facilities included a dedicated area of approximately 800 square feet (74 m^{2}) for a news desk, three TV cameras, nine video monitors, radio microphones, and a news ticker, all open to public view. The remainder of the 4,500 square feet (420 m^{2}) space is shared with the "Newsfeed Cafe", a fast-casual restaurant which is open during and outside of studio operational hours. The facility is believed to be the first collaboration between a library and a permanent on-site news organization studio. The space is used for twice-weekly live broadcasts of Boston Public Radio with Jim Braude and Margery Eagan, weekly taping of Greater Boston, and various special events, such as live music performances, poetry recitals, and interviews with book authors. Events are generally open to the public and free of charge.

== Logo and soundmark ==
Secondary logo used for station branding from 1973 to 2010

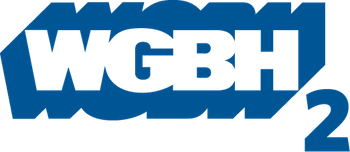
WGBH 2 logo from 2010 to 2020. The main portion of the logo had been used since 1974 as a national and corporate logo.

On August 27, 2020, it was announced that the WGBH Educational Foundation would re-brand all of its operations as "GBH", with WGBH-TV subsequently re-branding from "WGBH 2" to "GBH 2". The organization felt that the inclusion of the "W" prefix was too synonymous with terrestrial broadcasting, and did not reflect its current multi-platform operations. WGBH also cited that "GBH" was already commonly used as a shorthand name for the station. Along with the rebrand came a modified version of its iconic wordmark logo, in use since 1974.

External videos
- 1977 production credit
- 2013 station ID
- Current production credit since 2020
- Mini-documentary on evolution of logo

Since the early 1970s, WGBH has used a distinctive soundmark created by composer Gershon Kingsley in conjunction with creative director Sylvia Davis and general manager Michael Rice. It is an electronic sound using a Moog synthesizer described as a crescendo. The sound has been updated periodically by manipulating the original recording with modern tools through the years, most recently in 2020.

== Programming ==
As a PBS member station, much of WGBH-TV's program schedule consists of educational and entertainment programming distributed by PBS to its member stations, including non-WGBH productions such as the PBS NewsHour, the Nightly Business Report, Sesame Street, Peg + Cat, and Nature; it also carries programs distributed by American Public Television and other sources to fill its schedule, alongside programs produced for exclusive local broadcast in the Boston market.

WGBH features a mix of live-action and animated children's programs produced by the station and other distributors between 6 a.m. and 2 p.m., as well as on Saturday and Sunday mornings. The remainder of its weekday lineup includes a two-hour block of news and travel programs leading into prime time, with documentary, arts and entertainment programs provided by PBS shown Sunday through Fridays during prime time (encores of WGBH national productions typically air on Saturday evenings). Programming on Saturday afternoons focuses heavily on cooking and home improvement how-to shows (at one point, the station's Saturday afternoon lineup was branded as "How 2 Saturday"), while Sunday afternoons focus mainly on travel shows along with some how-to programs.

=== Original productions ===
For the better part of its history, WGBH-TV has been a major producer of programming for PBS and its predecessor, NET. Channel 2 produces more than two-thirds of the programs that PBS distributes nationally to its member stations. Among them are longstanding PBS mainstays such as Nova, Frontline, Masterpiece, American Experience, The Victory Garden, and This Old House.

Other notable programs originated by WGBH have included The French Chef (a pioneering cooking show featuring Julia Child), and The Scarlet Letter (a major costume drama miniseries produced on-location that was the first challenger to the British dominance in such programming in America, and was PBS's highest-rated series for many years). The station has co-produced many other period dramas in conjunction with British production companies. Broadcasts of concerts by the Boston Symphony established the genre as a staple on television.

WGBH has also engaged in several experiments in programming and technology that have become standard in television, including:

- Nam June Paik's wild morphing of the television image, and antic adventures in narrative story-telling (What's Happening, Mr. Silver?, Nine Heroes)
- Ron Hays' use of slit-scan imagery inspired by the yearning, driving themes of Wagner's Liebestod
- The two-screen color stereo dance program CITY/motion/space/game.
- Arts series produced in collaboration with Boston's Museum of Fine Arts (Museum Open House, Images, Eye-to-Eye) set the bar for the medium and were a major contributing force in "video art".
- The Workshop for New Television developed works in dance (Dan Wagoner's George's House) and in drama (Mary Feldhaus-Weber's RED, BLUE, GOLD).

==== Notable general-audience programs produced by WGBH ====
- Adventure
- Africans in America (1998–1999; PBS)
- America's Ballroom Challenge
- American Experience (1988–present; PBS)
- Andre's Mother
- Antiques Roadshow (1997–present; PBS)
- Antiques Roadshow FYI
- Ask This Old House (2002–present)
- The Art of Logos
- Basic Black
- Beat the Press, a weekly program of media criticism airing Friday evenings, hosted by Emily Rooney
- A Biography of America (2000–2001)
- Camera Three
- The Captioned ABC News (1973–1982)
- Conspiracy of Kindness (2005; PBS)
- Commanding Heights: The Battle for the World Economy (2002; PBS)
- Culture Shock (2000; PBS)
- Destinos: An Introduction to Spanish (1992–1993)
- Discover: The World of Science
- Discovering Psychology
- Dracula (2007, co-production with BBC Wales and Granada Television)
- Endgame: Ethics and Values in America (2002; PBS, produced with Scott Goldstein Productions)
- Evening at Pops (1970–2005; PBS)
- Evolution (2001; PBS, produced with Clear Blue Sky Productions, Inc.)
- Eye-to-Eye
- 50 Years War: Israel and the Arabs (January 24–25, 1999; PBS)
- The Fool of the World and the Flying Ship
- The French Chef (1963–1973)
- French in Action (1987)
- Frontline (1983–present; PBS)
- Frontline/World (PBS)
- Gourmet's Diary of a Foodie
- Greater Boston, a public affairs program on issues of local interest, airing Monday–Thursday on WGBH-TV and repeated later on WGBX-TV, hosted by Jim Braude
- High School Quiz Show
- Joyce Chen Cooks (1967)
- Julia Child & Company (1978–1979)
- Lidia's Italy (from 2009)
- Lidia's Kitchen (2013–present)
- Little Dorrit (2009; joint production with BBC)
- Long Ago & Far Away
- Making Things Grow (1966–1969)
- Masterpiece (formerly known as Masterpiece Theatre; 1971–present, PBS)
- Mill Times (2002; PBS)
- The Mind of a Chef (2012–2017; PBS)
- Misunderstood Minds (2002; PBS)
- MIT Science Reporter
- Moveable Feast with Fine Cooking Magazine (2013–present)
- Mr. Tornado (2020; PBS)
- Neighborhood Kitchens (2011–present; created, written, directed and produced by Patricia Alvarado Nuñez)
- The New Yankee Workshop
- Nova (1974–present; PBS)
- Nova ScienceNow
- Old Settler (2001–2004; PBS)
- PBS Millennium 2000
- People's Century (1995, April 19, 1998 – July 5, 1999; PBS, produced in conjunction with the BBC)
- Religious America (1974, 13 episodes; PBS)
- The Scarlet Letter (1979)
- Simply Ming
- Skinwalkers (2002; PBS)
- Stories from the Stage (2017–present; World)
- The Ten O'Clock News
- They Made America (2004; PBS)
- This Old House (1979–present; PBS)
- The Victory Garden (1975–present; PBS)
- War and Peace in the Nuclear Age
- Weekends with Yankee (2017–present)
- The Western Tradition
- Woof! It's A Dog's Life
- Wuthering Heights (2009, with ITV)

==== Notable children's programs produced by WGBH ====
- All About You (1974; produced for the Agency for Instructional Television)
- Arthur (1996–2022; PBS, produced with Cookie Jar Group seasons 1–15 (seasons 1–8 as CINAR, seasons 9–15 as Cookie Jar Entertainment), seasons 16–19 with 9 Story Media Group, seasons 20–25 with Oasis Animation)
- Between the Lions (2000–2010, PBS; with Sirius Thinking Ltd. and Mississippi Public Broadcasting)
- Curious George (2006–2022, PBS; with Imagine Entertainment and Universal Animation Studios)
- Design Squad (2007–2011)
- Don't Look Now (1983, PBS; short-lived clone of You Can't Do That on Television by the same producers)
- Fetch! with Ruff Ruffman (2006–2010, PBS)
- Martha Speaks (2008–2014, PBS; produced with Studio B Productions seasons 1–4, seasons 5 and 6 with Oasis Animation)
- Molly of Denali (2019–present; PBS, produced with Atomic Cartoons)
- Peep and the Big Wide World (2004–2011, PBS; produced with 9 Story Media Group for PBS Kids)
- Plum Landing (2014–present; PBS)
- Pinkalicious & Peterrific (2018–present; PBS, produced with Sixteen South)
- Postcards from Buster (2004–2012, PBS; produced with Marc Brown Studios, Cookie Jar Group seasons 1–2, seasons 3 and 4 with 9 Story Media Group)
- Rebop (1976–1979, PBS)
- Sara Solves It (failed pilot for Amazon Video; 2013, produced with DHX Media Vancouver and Out of the Blue Enterprises)
- Time Warp Trio (2005–2006, produced with Soup2Nuts for Discovery Kids)
- Where in the World Is Carmen Sandiego (1991–1995, PBS; in partnership with WQED in Pittsburgh)
- Where in Time Is Carmen Sandiego (1996–1997, PBS; in partnership with WQED in Pittsburgh)
- Work It Out Wombats! (2023–present, PBS, produced with Pipeline Studios)
- Zoom (1972–1978 and 1999–2005, PBS)

== Notable alumni of WGBH productions ==
- Norm Abram – host of New Yankee Workshop
- Liliana Abud – host of Destinos: An Introduction to Spanish
- Russell Baker – host of Masterpiece Theatre
- Jim Braude – co-host of daily Boston Public Radio and weekly Greater Boston TV program
- Pierre Capretz – host of French in Action
- Julia Child – host of The French Chef
- Bud Collins – announcer for Tennis: US Pro; National Doubles
- Alistair Cooke – host of Masterpiece Theatre
- James Underwood Crockett – host of The Victory Garden
- Steve Curwood – anchor for The Ten O'Clock News
- Michael Dukakis – host of The Advocates
- Margery Eagan – co-host of daily Boston Public Radio program and weekly Greater Boston TV program
- Roger Fisher – host of The Advocates
- Michael Kolowich – anchor for The Ten O'Clock News
- Robert Krulwich – host of NOVA scienceNOW
- Robert J. Lurtsema (known as "Lurtz") – NOVA
- Christopher Lydon – anchor for The Ten O'Clock News
- Will Lyman – Frontline narrator and announcer
- Louis M. Lyons - anchor of The Ten O'Clock News during the 1960s and 1970s
- Thomas J. MacDonald – host of Rough Cut - Woodworking with Tommy Mac
- Dodge Morgan - host of Adventure
- Elliot Norton – host of Elliot Norton Reviews
- Vincent Price – host of Mystery!
- Diana Rigg – host of Mystery!
- Emily Rooney – Greater Boston and Beat the Press
- William A. Rusher – host of The Advocates
- David Rutstein – host of Facts of Medicine
- Gene Shalit – host of Mystery!
- Neil deGrasse Tyson – host of Nova ScienceNOW
- Bob Vila – host of This Old House
- Judy Woodruff – Frontline host from 1984 to 1990

WGBH alumni maintain a website where stories and photographs are shared; reunions were held in 2000 and 2006.

== Technical information ==
=== Subchannels ===
Subchannels of WGBH-TV and WFXZ-CD
License	Subchannel	Res.	Short name	Programming
WGBH-TV	2.1	1080i	WGBH-HD	PBS
WGBH-TV	44.1	1080i	WGBX-HD	PBS (WGBX-TV)
WGBH-TV	66.5	480i	ON AIR	Infomercials (WUNI)
WFXZ-CD	24.1	480i	WFXZ	Biz TV

Simulcast of subchannels of another station
Broadcast on behalf of another station

The PBS subchannel is offered in ATSC 3.0 (NextGen TV) format from the transmitter of WUNI.

Note that due to WGBX's channel share agreement with NBC's WBTS-CD, WGBH instead carries the high definition feed identified as channel 44.1.

In 2010, WGBH-TV became the first television station in the Boston market to provide a mobile DTV signal. It transmits two free-to-air channels using the ATSC-M/H standard, at 2.75 Mbit/s, with its first subchannel labelled as "WGBH CH 2".

=== WGBH-DT2 ===
WGBH launched a digital subchannel on virtual channel 2.2 in December 2005, which initially served as an affiliate of the World news and documentary service (the subchannel was branded as "WGBH World"). In 2007, World programming was moved to the 44.2 subchannel of WGBX; WGBH replaced the network with a standard definition simulcast of its analog feed. The station discontinued the SD simulcast of channel 2.1 on April 17, 2012, when WGBH-DT2 re-assumed the local affiliation rights to World, which was simulcast on WGBX-DT2 for several months after the switch, before the former subchannel became its exclusive Boston outlet.

=== WGBH-DT3 ===
WGBH launched a tertiary subchannel on virtual channel 2.3 in 2005, which offered high definition program content separate from that seen on the station's analog signal via the PBS-HD satellite feed; in 2008, the subchannel switched to a high-definition simulcast of the analog signal, with standard-definition programming presented in a windowboxed or letterboxed format. WGBH decommissioned the DT3 feed in 2010.

=== Spectrum auction repacking ===
In a list announcing the winning bids for stations which participated in the 2016 United States wireless spectrum auction released by the FCC on April 13, 2017, WGBH-TV was disclosed to have agreed to sell a portion of the broadcast spectrum allocated to its UHF channel 19 digital signal for a bid of $161,723,929; in a statement, the station said it would "use the proceeds to expand its educational services to children and students, further its in-depth journalism, and strengthen its modest endowment." The station also consigned to move its digital allocation to a low-band VHF channel; the FCC assigned VHF channel 5 (the former analog channel allocation of WCVB-TV) as the post-repack digital allocation to which WGBH was reassigned once the repacking of auction and repack participant stations were occurred on August 2, 2019. WGBH-TV's post repack facility on VHF 5 is located at the nearby American Tower owned facility on Cabot Street, also in Needham.

Because the VHF channel 5 signal was significantly weaker than the prior UHF channel 19 signal, the repack initially left many over-the-air viewers in the Greater Boston area unable to receive the station's primary broadcasts on WGBH 2.1 and WGBX 44.1. A notice posted on the station's website in August 2018 stated that a power upgrade was forthcoming which would boost the signal from 6.9 kW to 34.5 kW, but that the upgrade was "temporarily on hold, pending the mitigation of the COVID-19 pandemic". In the spring of 2021, the upgrade to 34.5 kW was finally completed, but a VHF antenna specifically designed to receive low-band signals (channels 2-6), such as an FM dipole antenna, is now required for most viewers.

=== Former translator ===
WGBH formerly operated a low-power translator in Hyannis, W08CH (channel 8), which later ceased operations. The translator's license and callsign were deleted by the FCC in 2004.

== Related services ==
=== Television stations ===
==== WGBX-TV ====
WGBH-TV operates a secondary station in the Boston market, WGBX-TV (channel 44), which signed on the air on September 25, 1967. The station's schedule focuses on program genres not covered by WGBH-TV. Reruns of programs aired the previous evening on WGBX and WGBH-TV also make up a portion of the station's programming schedule. WGBX also maintains several digital subchannels that rebroadcast programs produced by WGBH and other PBS member stations, and serves as a multiplex station which also rebroadcasts NBC station WBTS-CD throughout the entire Boston market.

==== WGBY-TV ====
GBH also owns WGBY (channel 57), the PBS member station for the Springfield, Massachusetts, market, which signed on the air on September 26, 1971. It was run separately from the Boston operations of WGBH television and radio and WGBX-TV.

In 2019, the station became part of New England Public Media, a joint venture with the local NPR station WFCR.

=== Media Access Group ===
Since its creation in 1990, WGBH's Media Access Group is a leading provider of accessible media services to television producers, home video, websites, and movie theaters throughout the United States. The unit originated with the founding of The Caption Center in 1972, which invented the method of closed captioning to improve access to television programs for the deaf and hard-of-hearing (The French Chef was the first program to offer captioning provided by the unit), and created the Rear Window Captioning System for films. Along with providing closed captions for television programs seen on channel 2 and its sister stations, the Media Access Group is a major captioning provider for programs on other broadcast television networks and several cable channels. It also developed the Descriptive Video Service, and is the main provider for audio description soundtracks that give blind and low-vision viewers details about events occurring on-screen within an individual program, which can be found on streaming services as well as PBS stations, select broadcast networks and cable channels.

=== Online resources ===
The internet is WGBH's third platform; all radio and television programs produced by the stations have web components that are available at wgbh.org. The WGBH website also incorporates "web-only" productions:

- WGBH Forum Network – a service offering free online public lecture videos and podcasts, produced in partnership with Boston's leading cultural and educational organizations
- WGBH Podcasts – available at wgbh.org/podcasts, the service provides exclusive podcasts as well as podcasts related to WGBH original productions (such as Morning Stories, produced for WGBH radio and WGBH.org, The Scrum and Security Mom) available for mobile download
- WGBH Media Library and Archives – available at openvault.wgbh.org, the site features archived WGBH program content.
- FFFBI (The Fin, Fur and Feather Bureau of Investigation) – an interactive website aimed at children that was developed through a partnership with National Geographic; the site features interactive games themed in the style of a detective story that are designed to help children learn science and engineering principles.
- PBS LearningMedia – a partnership with PBS, which provides digital content and solutions for use in grade school instruction.
- The WGBH Lab – a partnership with the World network, which incorporates featured content produced by independent and public media filmmakers.
- Engineer Your Life – a partnership with the National Science Foundation, the Northrop Grumman Foundation, Stephen D. Bechtel, Jr. and the United Engineering Foundation, featuring stories and vocational information about careers in the engineering field, aimed at high school girls ages 14 to 17.
- American Archive of Public Broadcasting—a collaboration between the Library of Congress and WGBH to coordinate a national effort to digitally preserve and make accessible historically significant public radio and television collections created over the past 70+ years.

== See also ==
- List of television stations in Massachusetts
- List of United States stations available in Canada

== Video links ==
- WGBH 125 Western Ave final tour on Vimeo
