= WGBH (FM) =

Public radio station in Boston, U.S.

- Boston, Massachusetts; United States
- Broadcast area: Greater Boston
- Frequency: 89.7 MHz (HD Radio)
- RDS: WGBH 89.7
- Branding: GBH 89.7

Programming
- Language: English
- Format: Public radio
- Subchannels: HD2: Simulcast of WCRB; HD3: Simulcast of WCAI
- Affiliations: National Public Radio (NPR); Public Radio Exchange (PRX); American Public Media (APM)

Ownership
- Owner: WGBH Educational Foundation
- Sister stations: Radio: WCAI; WCRB; WNAN; WZAI; TV: WFXZ-CD; WGBH-TV; WGBX-TV; WGBY-TV

History
- First air date: October 6, 1951
- Former call signs: WGBH (1951–1954); WGBH-FM (1954–1973)
- Call sign meaning: Great Blue Hill

Technical information
- Licensing authority: FCC
- Facility ID: 70510
- Class: B
- ERP: 98,000 watts
- HAAT: 198 meters (650 ft)
- Transmitter coordinates: 42°12′42.3″N 71°6′49.1″W

Links
- Public license information: Public file; LMS
- Webcast: Listen live; HD2 (WCRB): Listen live; HD3 (WCAI): Listen live
- Website: www.wgbh.org/Radio

WGBH (89.7 FM, "GBH 89.7") is a public radio station located in Boston, Massachusetts. WGBH is a member station of National Public Radio (NPR) and affiliate of Public Radio Exchange (PRX) and American Public Media (APM). WGBH is the flagship radio property of the WGBH Educational Foundation, which also owns company flagship WGBH-TV and WGBX-TV, along with WGBY-TV in Springfield and WCAI-FM on Cape Cod and the Islands.

The station, dubbed Boston Public Radio in 2009, renamed Boston's Local NPR, broadcasts a news-and-information format during the daytime (including NPR News programs and PRX's The World, which is a co-production of WGBH and PRX, and formerly the BBC World Service), and jazz music during the nighttime.

Prior to December 1, 2009, the station had a mixed news and entertainment format, featuring local jazz and blues programs, with the station tagline being "Boston’s NPR Arts & Culture Station", to differentiate it from all news WBUR-FM, also located in Boston and known at the time as "Boston's NPR News Station". Following the rebranding, much of the station's culture-related programming was dropped in favor of nationally syndicated NPR, PRI, and APM programs.

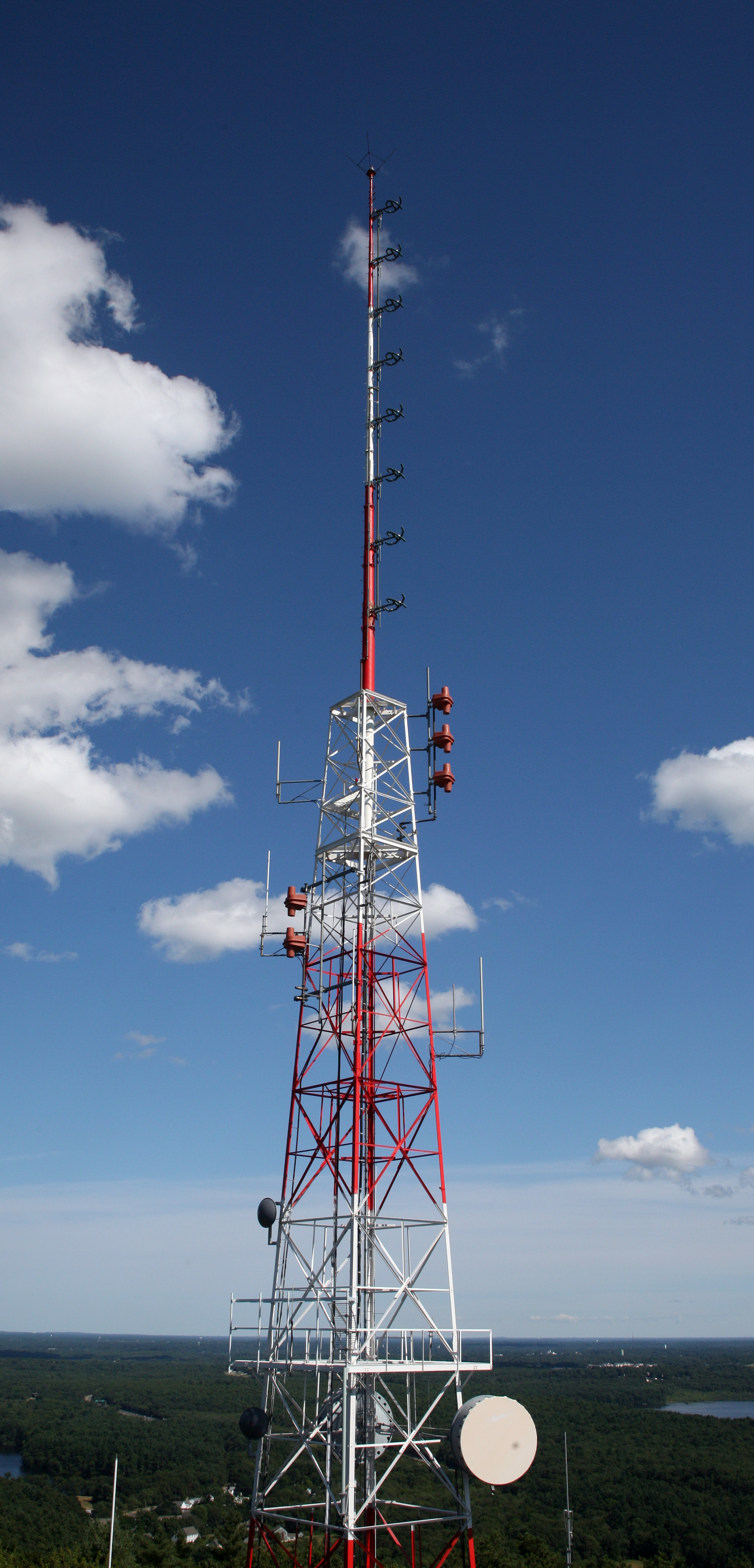
WGBH radio transmitter atop Great Blue Hill

"GBH" stands for Great Blue Hill, the site of WGBH's FM transmitter in Milton, Massachusetts, as well as the original location of WGBH-TV's transmitter. Great Blue Hill has an elevation of 635 feet (193 m), is located within the Blue Hills Reservation, and is the highest natural point in the Boston area. Mai Cramer, longtime host of the program Blues After Hours, jokingly maintained that the station's call sign stands for: "We Got Blues Here!"

According to Nielsen data aggregated by Ken Mills, a Minneapolis broadcast consultant, as of June 2017 the number of WGBH's listeners has nearly doubled since 2012, increasing from 235,200 to 445,200. WGBH is the 10th-most-popular NPR news station in the United States.

== Stations ==
The main WGBH signal operates at 98,000 watts, which is strong enough to cover the eastern half of Massachusetts, as well as Rhode Island, Eastern Connecticut, much of southern New Hampshire, and the southern tip of Maine. Indeed, for years WGBH claimed Providence, Rhode Island, as part of its primary coverage area; the station still provides a strong city-grade signal to Rhode Island's capital.

WGBH also operates a separately-programmed service for the Cape Cod and Islands area, with a full-time news-and-information format. This service is simulcast on three stations: WCAI in Woods Hole, WNAN in Nantucket, and WZAI in Brewster.

WGBH also owns WCRB, a classical music station. This service is simulcast by WJMF in Smithfield, Rhode Island (near Providence).

Both WCAI and WCRB are also simulcast on HD Radio subcarriers of WGBH itself. The WCRB simulcast on WGBH-HD2 is also relayed by translator W242AA (96.3 FM) East Cambridge, as the Federal Communications Commission regards it as a WGBH translator (from October 1991 until April 8, 2010, W242AA carried WGBH's main service).

WGBH, WCAI, and WCRB all stream their programming worldwide on the Internet.

== History ==
WGBH Educational Foundation received its first broadcasting license (for radio) in 1951 under the auspices of the Lowell Institute Cooperative Broadcasting Council, a consortium of local universities and cultural institutions, whose collaboration stems from an 1836 bequest by textile manufacturer John Lowell Jr. calling for free public lectures for the citizens of Boston.

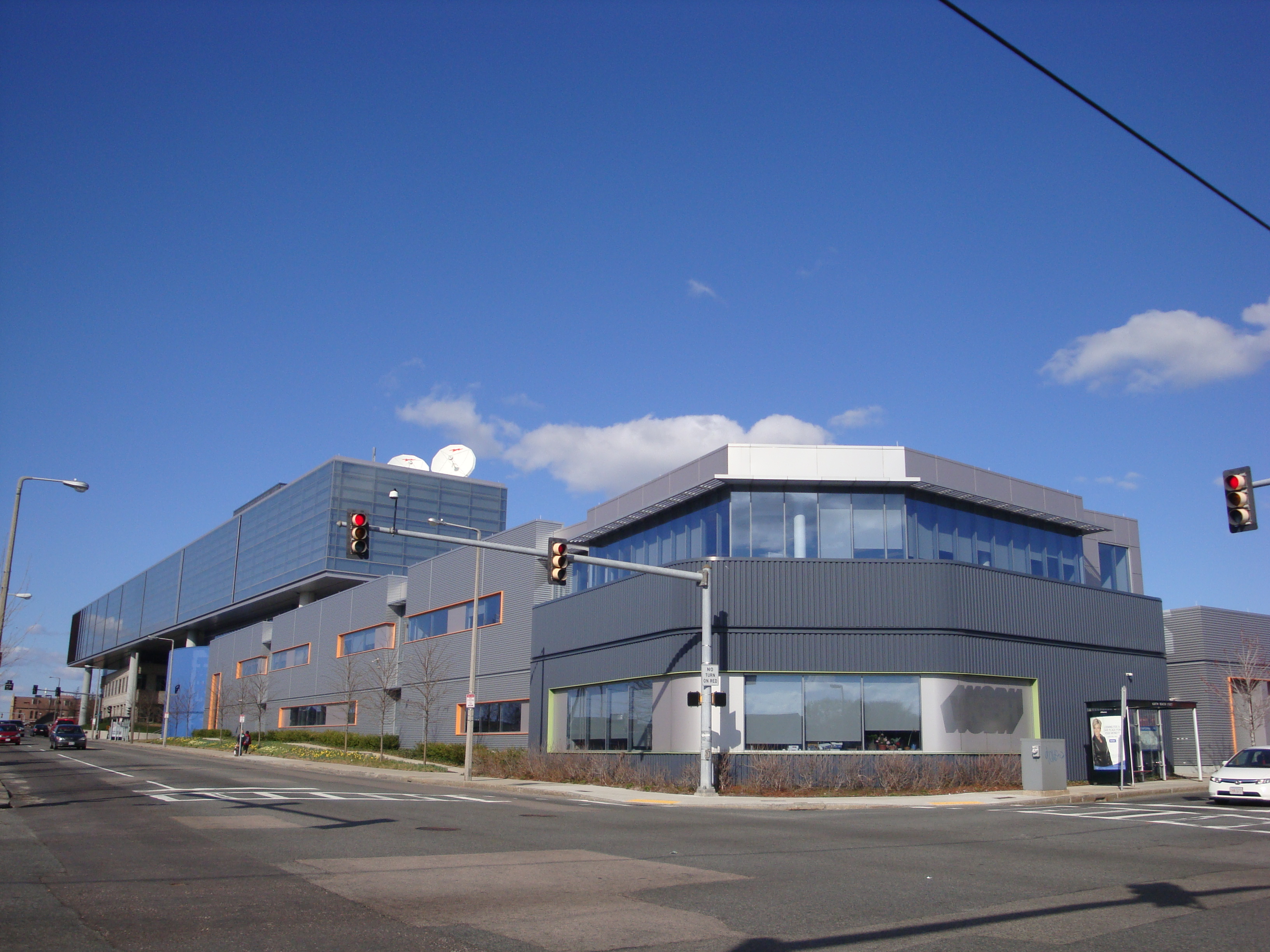
WGBH radio studios in Boston (on Market Street, within the WGBH Guest Street studio complex)

WGBH signed on October 6, 1951, with a live broadcast of the Boston Symphony Orchestra. Within a decade, it had grown enough that it partnered with the Five Colleges to set up a repeater for western Massachusetts, WFCR. That repeater became a full-fledged station in 1962, and is now the flagship NPR outlet for western Massachusetts.

WGBH was a charter member of NPR, and was one of the stations that carried the inaugural broadcast of All Things Considered in 1971.

In the summer of 2016, the station began broadcasting some of its programming from an on-air studio in the newly renovated Boston Public Library Johnson building, fronting on Boylston Street in Back Bay.

In May 2024, WGBH laid off 31 employees across 13 departments, a 4% staff reduction. Production of three television programs was also suspended. Another 6% were laid off in June 2025.

== Programming ==
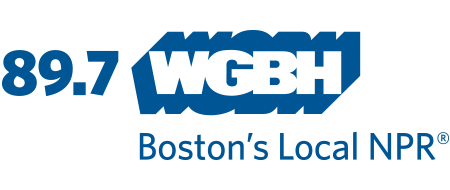
WGBH radio logo used until August 2020

WGBH broadcasts news programming, generally from NPR or PRI. On weekends and some weekday evenings, a variety of public affairs programming and other informational/entertainment programming is featured, such as This American Life, The Moth, Selected Shorts, Freakonomics, On Being, Radiolab, Studio 360, and The New Yorker Radio Hour.

Jazz music is broadcast on weekend evenings and overnights. Until July 2, 2012, WGBH also carried jazz during the evening and overnight hours on Mondays through Thursdays; this programming was cut back to increase news and information programming during the evening and overnight hours. Saturday programming consists of various syndicated programs such as Weekend Edition, Wait Wait... Don't Tell Me!, This American Life, and others.

Celtic music was featured in the long-running locally produced WGBH show, A Celtic Sojourn, hosted by Brian O'Donovan from 1986 until his death in 2023.

Programs originating from WGBH for the local market include:

- Boston Public Radio, a daily three-hour local public affairs talk show co-hosted by Jim Braude and Margery Eagan.
- Arts and Ideas, a three-hour news and arts magazine broadcast on Sunday evenings

Programs originating from WGBH that are also broadcast in other markets include:

- America's Test Kitchen Radio
- Says You!
- The World (co-produced with the BBC World Service)
- The Changing World
- From the Top
- Innovation Hub

=== 2009 format change ===
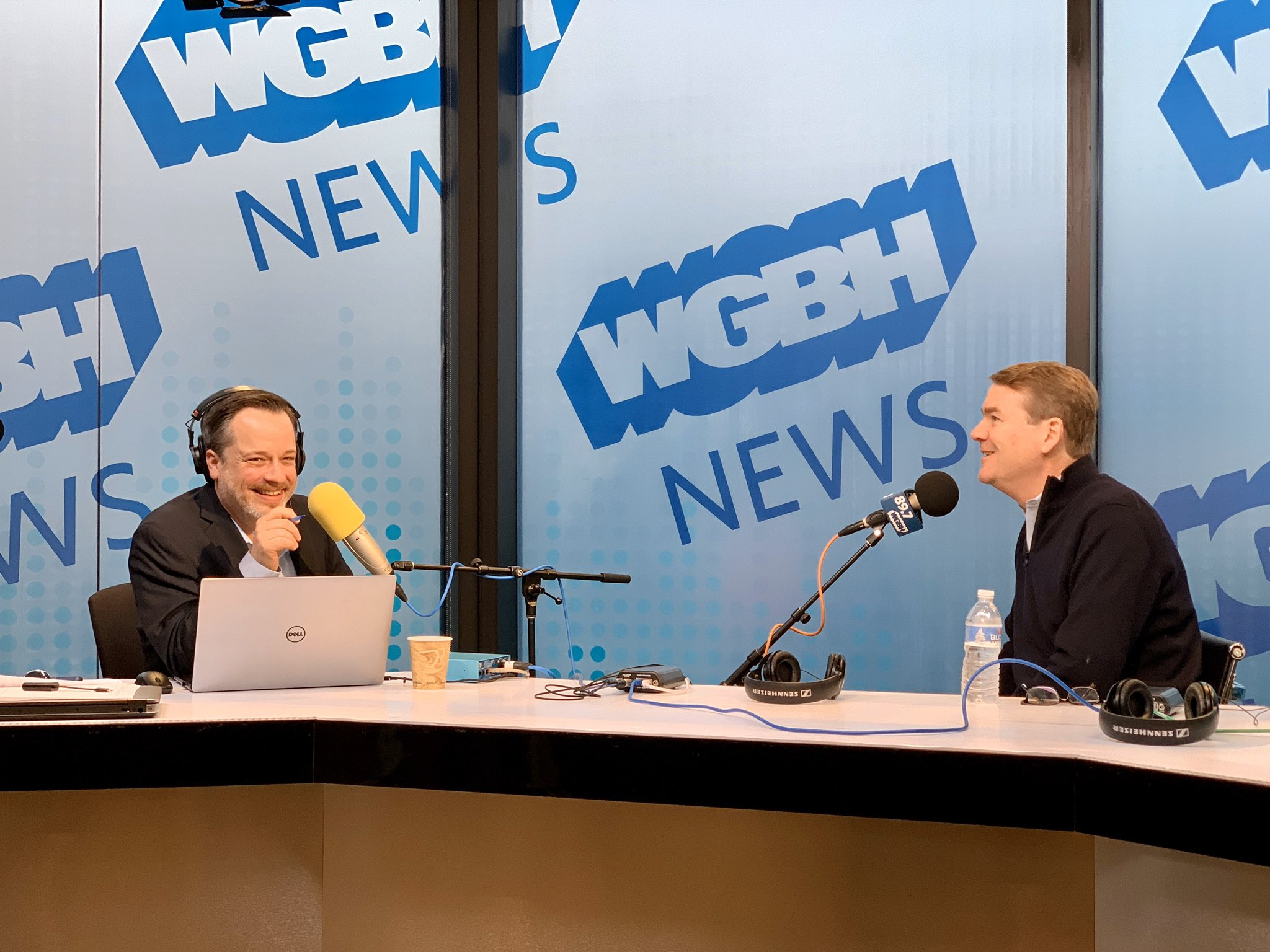
Senator Michael Bennet on air with Joe Mathieu in 2020

Until December 1, 2009, WGBH broadcast a variety of classical music programming, mostly during the day on weekdays, weekend mornings, and Sunday afternoons. These broadcasts included (in addition to generally available recordings) recordings made by WGBH of regional chamber music and solo recital performances, live in-studio performances and interviews, as well as live broadcasts of the Boston Symphony Orchestra from Symphony Hall (on Friday afternoons when the orchestra is scheduled to play), and Tanglewood (on Sunday afternoons in the summer).

In addition, WGBH's music programming also included folk music on Saturday afternoons and blues on Saturday evenings.

In September 2009, the WGBH Educational Foundation announced a deal to acquire WCRB, a local classical music station. It consolidated all classical music programming on WCRB, and changed WGBH to an all-news and information format. A significant number of WGBH's traditional classical listeners were sacrificed in the transition, as WCRB transmits from the North Shore of Boston, and cannot be received reliably in areas to the south, including Cape Cod. In November 2009 the station announced that its long-running Saturday afternoon folk and Saturday evening blues programs would be discontinued in December, however A Celtic Sojourn and A Prairie Home Companion would remain.

==== Jazz cutback ====
On June 20, 2012, it was announced that WGBH would cut back jazz to nine hours a week, replacing weeknight evening and overnight jazz programming with public radio news and information programming. The cutback in jazz took place on July 2, 2012. Eric Jackson still does nine hours of jazz programming on weekends; Steve Schwartz's Friday show was eliminated completely.

The same notice announced that in July 2012, WGBH would combine the hour-long Emily Rooney Show and Callie Crossley Show into a two-hour segment named Boston Public Radio. The station also started carrying the APM show Marketplace.

In February 2013, Jim Braude and Margery Eagan (previously co-hosts of the Jim & Margery Show talk show on WTKK) were brought on to co-host Boston Public Radio. They brought along with them the monthly Ask the Governor program, a series that WGBH also provides to other local stations free of charge.

==== Programming overlap ====
WGBH and WBUR-FM both serve the Boston area, and there is some overlap between programming on the two stations (i.e. All Things Considered, Morning Edition). When WGBH announced plans to convert their daytime hours to news and information, there was speculation as to how much overlap between the two stations there would be.

WGBH broadcasts The World and the sound portion of the PBS NewsHour, while WBUR does not. As mentioned above, The World is locally produced by WGBH. WBUR carries Talk of the Nation, On Point, Here and Now, and Car Talk, which are not heard on WGBH. The latter three programs are produced locally by WBUR.

The two stations also broadcast somewhat different selections from among the programs available through their national network affiliations.

== See also ==
- Great Blue Hill
- WGBH-TV
- WGBH Educational Foundation
