= WGBH Educational Foundation =

Public broadcasting organization in Boston

- Named after: Great Blue Hill
- Formation: April 5, 1951; 75 years ago
- Founded at: Boston, Massachusetts
- Tax ID no.: 04-2104397
- Fields: Public broadcasting
- Official language: English
- Leader: Susan Goldberg
- Subsidiaries: PBS Distribution
- Affiliations: PBS; NPR; Public Radio Exchange; American Public Media; American Public Television; National Educational Telecommunications Association
- Revenue: 225,004,242 USD (2024)
- Expenses: 231,562,495 USD (2024)
- Website: www.wgbh.org

The WGBH Educational Foundation, doing business as GBH since August 2020, is an American public broadcasting group and television production company based in Boston, Massachusetts. Established in 1951, it holds the licenses to all of the PBS member stations in Massachusetts, and operates its flagship station WGBH-TV, sister station WGBX-TV, and a group of NPR member stations in the state. It also owns WGBY-TV in Springfield, which is operated by New England Public Media under a program service agreement.

Nationally, WGBH is known as the distributor of a number of major PBS programs, including American Experience, Arthur, Frontline, Masterpiece, and Nova, among others; as the owner of Public Radio International until 2018, a syndicate of public radio programming; and for its role in the development of closed captioning and audio description technologies for broadcast television.

== History ==
WGBH logo used from 1974 to 2020

In the 1990s, the WGBH Educational Foundation published books and other educational materials such as Africans in America: America's Journey Through Slavery.

In 2003, WGBH and the City of Boston formed a joint venture for Boston Kids & Family TV channel that replaces one of the city's cable access channels. Boston Kids was launched on October 31, 2003.

By December 2005, Boston’s WGBH and New York City's WNET were already broadcasting a local version of World on a subchannel. and added by April 2006, Washington’s WETA. Then, WGBH and WNET teamed up with PBS, APT and NETA to roll out a national version of the local channels as PBS World. The network was launched nationally on August 15, 2007.

In July 2012, WGBH acquired Public Radio International (PRI). PRI would continue with its own board while WGBH would be able to distribute more of its programs through PRI.

In November 2015, WGBH purchased GlobalPost, with editorial operation and reporting resources being merged with PRI's The World news staff.

On August 27, 2020, it was announced that WGBH would shorten its name to "GBH" as part of a larger corporate reimaging (which saw the adoption of purple as a new corporate color, and a font originally commissioned for Red Hat as its new corporate typeface). The foundation stated that due to its present-day multi-platform operations, the full WGBH call sign was too synonymous with broadcast media; "WGBH" will still be used as part of the organization's formal name. All other WGBH-owned and operated stations similarly dropped the W from their respective brandings, such as WCRB rebranding as "CRB Classical 99.5".

== Board of trustees ==
Richard M. Burnes Jr. of Charles River Ventures is the chair of the board as of 2014, replacing Amos Hostetter Jr., who left the board. Henry P. Becton Jr., former WGBH President, and Maureen L. Ruettgers, the wife of former EMC Corporation CEO Michael Ruettgers, are vice chairs. Jonathan C. Abbott, as WGBH president, is also on the board. William N. Thorndike Jr., managing partner of the Housatonic Partners private equity firm, is on the board of trustees as the chair of the WGBH board of overseers.

The presidents of four regional universities are institutional trustees: Joseph E. Aoun of Northeastern University, Jackie Jenkins-Scott of Wheelock College, Frederick M. Lawrence of Brandeis University, and L. Rafael Reif of MIT.

The remaining board members are:

- Amy Abrams, wife of Abrams Capital founder David C. Abrams
- Terrie F. Bloom, wife of Berkshire Partners managing director Bradley Bloom
- Laura A. DeBonis, former Google Books manager and wife of hedge fund executive and State Department official Scott Nathan
- Juan Enriquez, managing director of Excel Venture Management and husband of Cabot family heir Marjorie Cabot Lewis
- Ann L. Gund, wife of architect Graham Gund
- Susan B. Kaplan, daughter of Stanley H Kaplan and president of the Kaplin Family Foundation
- Marjie B. Kargman, wife of Commonwealth Capital Ventures founder Robert Kargman
- Sara Lawrence-Lightfoot, sociologist
- William A. Lowell, partner of the Choate, Hall & Stewart law firm
- Richard K. Lubin, managing director of Berkshire Partners
- Oscar F. Malcolm, president of Darien Capital Management
- Christopher J. McKown, husband of Fidelity Investments executive Abigail Johnson
- Cathy E. Minehan, former president of the Federal Reserve Bank of Boston
- Paul R. Murphy, former partner at the Foley Hoag law firm and former counsel for Amherst College
- Melinda Alliker Rabb, Brown University professor and wife of Stop & Shop heir James Rabb
- Henri A. Termeer, retired chairman, president, and CEO of Genzyme Corporation
- David T. Ting, president of Mugar Enterprises, the investment firm of Star Market heir David Mugar
- Hans Ziegler, retired senior managing director of Bernstein Global Wealth Management

== Units ==
- First 8 Studios, learning mobile app design group for kids ages 8 and younger
- Forum Network, a Lowell Institute funded online lecture
- GlobalPost
- PBS Distribution, a joint venture with PBS to distribute PBS and WGBH programs to various markets, home video, foreign, and commercial
- PBS LearningMedia, a joint venture with PBS to distribute teacher material related to PBS programs
- WGBH Education

=== Radio ===
- WCAI
- WCRB
- WGBH
- WNAN
- WZAI

WCAI, WNAN, and WZAI are the Cape, Coast, and Islands (CCI) NPR stations, serving part of southeastern Massachusetts.

==== Former Radio Properties ====
- Public Radio International (merged with Public Radio Exchange in 2018)

=== Television ===
- WGBH-TV: the foundation's flagship station
- WGBX-TV: its secondary Boston station
- WGBY-TV: Springfield, Massachusetts station; Operated by New England Public Media under a program service operating agreement.
- Create (TV network), a joint venture network with American Public Television (APT), WGBH, WNET, and National Educational Telecommunications Association (NETA).
- World Channel, a joint venture network with WNET, NETA, and APT.

=== Public Media Management ===
Public Media Management is a joint venture of WGBH and Sony Electronics for remote TV master control services over the internet.

Public Media Management was tested for a year. The services were available starting April 1, 2015, just before the two Las Vegas shows, PBS's April 8–10 TechCon and NAB Show April 11–16, to be able to showcase the service during the shows. WGBH's two Boston stations went live with PMM first followed by its Springfield, Massachusetts station WGBY in early May 2015. New Hampshire Public Television launched the system next. In August 2015, Maryland Public Television switched to using their system.

== See also ==
- Ralph Lowell, president of the foundation (1951–1970s)
