= WGBY-TV =

Television station in Springfield, Massachusetts

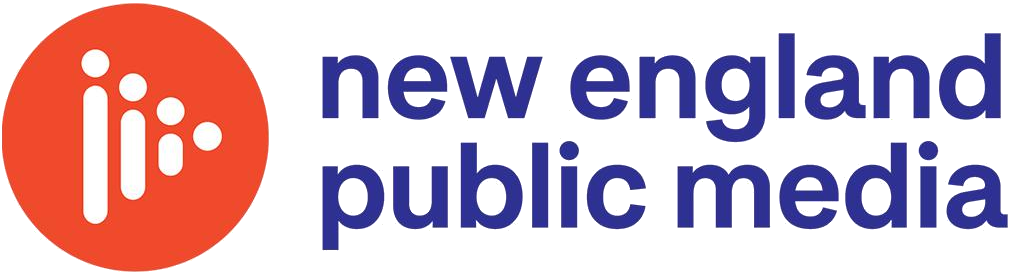
- Springfield–Holyoke, Massachusetts; United States
- City: Springfield, Massachusetts
- Channels: Digital: 13 (VHF); Virtual: 57
- Branding: New England Public Media

Programming
- Affiliations: 57.1: PBS; for others, see § Subchannels

Ownership
- Owner: WGBH Educational Foundation
- Operator: New England Public Media via program service agreement
- Sister stations: Radio: WFCR

History
- First air date: September 26, 1971
- Former channel numbers: Analog: 57 (UHF, 1971–2008); Digital: 58 (UHF, 2000–2009), 22 (UHF, 2009–2019)
- Call sign meaning: Great Blue Yonder (referring to WGBH's transmitter and distance from mother station; all WGBH television stations include these two letters)

Technical information
- Licensing authority: FCC
- Facility ID: 72096
- ERP: 63 kW
- HAAT: 303.2 m (995 ft)
- Transmitter coordinates: 42°14′29.5″N 72°38′54.1″W

Links
- Public license information: Public file; LMS
- Website: nepm.org

WGBY-TV (channel 57) is a PBS member television station in Springfield, Massachusetts, United States. Owned by the Boston-based WGBH Educational Foundation, it is a sister station to that organization's flagship and namesake, WGBH-TV, channel 2 (however, WGBY-TV brands as a separate, locally focused PBS outlet). WGBY-TV is operated by New England Public Media under a program service agreement with the WGBH Educational Foundation; NEPM also operates Amherst-licensed NPR member WFCR (88.5 FM) under a separate program service agreement with the University of Massachusetts. The two stations share studios in the Irene Mennen Hunter Public Media Center on Hampden Street alongside I-91 in downtown Springfield (named for the heiress to the Mennen personal care fortune and former WGBY-TV board member). WGBY-TV's transmitter is located on the peak of Mount Tom in Holyoke with some of the area's commercial television stations. WGBY-TV is also available on Comcast Xfinity channel 2 in Windham County, Vermont (alongside Vermont Public).

== History ==
The station first signed on the air on September 26, 1971, as a PBS member station. Prior to the station's sign-on (and for the network's first year of existence), viewers in Western Massachusetts could watch PBS programming over the air on outskirt public television stations, including WGBH-TV to the east, WMHT from Albany from the west, or WEDH from Hartford (the latter remains available on most cable providers in the Springfield market). In October 2006, WGBY became the first television station in New England to produce all of its local programming content in high definition. Some Spanish-language programming is also broadcast for Springfield's Hispanic and Latino community.

Unlike its Boston counterpart, WGBY had no affiliation with an NPR member station in the area until 2019; the area has been served by the Five College Consortium's WFCR and WNNZ/WAIC, collectively known as New England Public Radio. The WGBH Educational Foundation held the license of WFCR from 1961 until its transfer to the University of Massachusetts Amherst in 1967, four years before WGBY-TV began operations.

On April 11, 2019, WGBY and WFCR announced that they would consolidate operations under the New England Public Media banner, effective in July; the WGBH Educational Foundation will retain the WGBY-TV license, with NEPM operating the station under a program service operating agreement. All of the various NEPR stations and WGBY will continue to have their licenses and facilities owned by their individual organizations and schools. In July 2020, WGBY officially rebranded as a part of New England Public Media, rather than being a part of WGBH's overall September 1, 2020, rebranding of their Boston operations to remove the "W" as branding for their radio and television stations.

== Programming ==
WGBY features several locally produced programs, including the daily program Connecting Point, which has local features and roundtables involving aspects of Pioneer Valley arts, issues, economic, criminal, and educational issues. The Friday edition of the series is entitled The State We're In and deals with local and Commonwealth political issues, along with debate programming in election years.

As Schools Match Wits is a long-running local quiz bowl program which originated on WWLP in 1961, and moved to WGBY in 2007 under license from WWLP due to costs associated with newly enacted Federal Communications Commission (FCC) regulations involving closed captioning. The program is co-produced with Westfield State University.

Presencia is a weekly bilingual program which spotlights the region's Hispanic-American community, and uses captioning, dubbing, and subtitling to allow both Spanish and English-speaking viewers to equally watch the program.

== Technical information ==
=== Subchannels ===
The station's signal is multiplexed:

Subchannels of WGBY-TV
Channel	Res.	Short name	Programming
57.1	1080i	WGBYDT1	PBS
57.2	480i	WGBYDT2	World (4:3)
57.3	480i	WGBYDT3	PBS Kids (4:3)
57.4	480i	WGBYDT4	Create (4:3)

=== Analog-to-digital conversion ===
On August 4, 2008, WGBY filed a request with the FCC to discontinue regular programming on its analog signal, over UHF channel 57, on November 5, 2008—some three months prior to the original mandated analog shut-off date. The petition cited the need to replace the current analog antenna with the post transition digital 22 antenna. WGBY also filed for an STA to operate at 50% analog power prior to the early shut down date due to equipment failure Although it had an assigned digital channel that it would move to post-transition that differed from its original digital channel, WGBY continued to broadcast its digital signal on its pre-transition allocation (UHF channel 58). On April 27, 2009, the station's digital signal later moved to UHF channel 22, using virtual channel 57.

As a result of the FCC's 2016 spectrum auction, the WGBH Educational Foundation accepted a $57 million offer to moved WGBY-TV to the VHF spectrum on July 22, 2019, on channel 13, along with WGBH-TV for $161.7 million.

On January 16, 2017, the station launched the newest iteration of the PBS Kids Channel on their third subchannel.
