= Jeff Sneider =

American entertainment journalist

- Born: February 10, 1984 (age 42)
- Education: Tisch School of the Arts
- Occupations: Entertainment journalist; Podcaster

Jeff Sneider (born February 10, 1984) is an American entertainment journalist who founded the entertainment newsletter The InSneider. He graduated from the Tisch School of the Arts in 2006. Sneider started working at Ain't it Cool News under the name "MiraJeff" in 2003, then interned at Variety in 2006. He joined TheWrap in 2010 before returning to Variety in 2011, though he was fired in 2013 after making a tweet about killing himself because he lost a story to a The Hollywood Reporter writer. He rejoined TheWrap thereafter but was suspended in early 2016 following a dispute with a public relations representative about a lost scoop.

Sneider was senior film reporter for Mashable later in 2016, with his tenure at that site ending following a racially insensitive declaration about the #OscarsSoWhite controversy at the Academy Awards. Sneider served as editor-in-chief of the Tracking Board from 2017 to 2018, and he joined Collider from 2018 to 2021. Sneider contributed to The Ankler from 2021 to 2022, and had a tenure as the editor-in-chief of Above the Line from 2022 until 2023, leaving because of a pay dispute. He founded his independent newsletter The InSneider in November 2023 and co-hosts his weekly entertainment podcast The Hot Mic with film critic and content creator John Rocha, where they discuss his reports.

Sneider has engaged in publicized disputes with several figures in Hollywood and the media, including allegations of harassment and threats by Deadline Hollywood founder Nikki Finke, who rejected him from the publication, and fights with his "nemesis" Deadline writer Mike Fleming Jr. over "exclusive" story credits. He has clashed with actress Sydney Sweeney over a reported role in the Johnny Depp film Day Drinker (2027) which she denied, made claims about Sony scrapping the majority of Spider-Man: Beyond the Spider-Verse (2027) that drew the attention of producer Christopher Miller and composer Daniel Pemberton, and took issue with the representatives of actress Inde Navarrette over his criticized and unrequited public offers to journalistically cover her.

== Career ==
=== Career beginnings, trade reporting, and industry feuds (2003–2016) ===
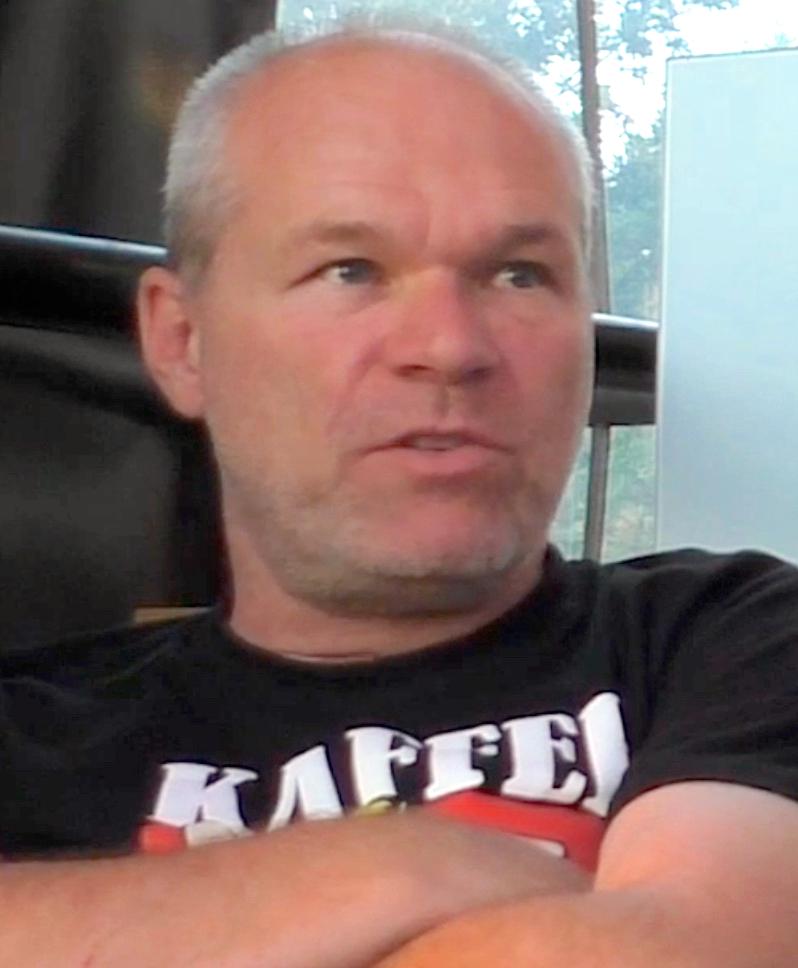
Jeff Sneider wrote for Harry Knowles's (left) website Ain't It Cool News at the beginning of his career, and once fought director Uwe Boll (right) on behalf of the publication.

Jeff Sneider was born on February 10, 1984, and lived in Needham, Massachusetts. He graduated in 2006 from the Tisch School of the Arts at New York University, from where he holds a Bachelor of Fine Arts in Dramatic Writing. He is Jewish. From 2003, Sneider wrote for Ain't It Cool News under the alias "MiraJeff", a portmanteau of his own name with the name of his favorite film studio, Harvey and Bob Weinstein's Miramax. In 2006, Sneider represented the website in a boxing tournament by director Uwe Boll, who fought contributors to websites that criticized him. Since the site's founder Harry Knowles exceeded the 190-pound weight limit, Sneider fought in the tournament despite not having reviewed one of Boll's films—he figured that since Ain't it Cool was known for criticizing Boll, the director had them in mind; Sneider even said he was Boll's "highest-profile target". He considered himself disadvantaged, and he progressed to the second round of his match before being taken down twice by Boll, at which point his cornerman then threw in the towel.

He joined Variety as an intern in August 2006 but was laid off in January 2009, then joined TheWrap in March 2010, where he anchored their Deal Central column until January 2011. Sneider returned to Variety in February of that year as a film reporter. In late January 2013, Sneider was fired from Variety. The outlet was reported to have fired him for "unprofessional" behavior, though it did not specify an incident. Sneider had recently been tracking a scoop on Christopher Nolan's then-prospective Interstellar, though lost this to The Hollywood Reporter's Kim Masters. As a result of Masters getting the scoop on the story over him, Sneider had tweeted about driving his car into a tree and declared his blood would be "on Hollywood's hands", and reportedly was asked by editors at Variety to write a letter of apology to a publicist who had promised to update him on the deal, from whom Sneider never saw confirmation of the story.

At the beginning of April 2013, he rejoined TheWrap to reprise his role covering casting and deals. Sneider stated he was grateful for the "second chance" and was impressed with the growth the outlet experienced since he had left. Sneider had been accused of harassment by Deadline Hollywood's founder Nikki Finke; she alleged in 2013 he had targeted her in 2009 with threatening emails and comments on the site referencing bodily harm after he was rejected from a position there. Finke had Sneider's IP address traced and threatened to involve law enforcement; Sneider later in 2010 and 2011 allegedly staked out Finke's apartment to find a photograph of her, eventually circulating a college yearbook photo on TheWrap in a campaign called 'Mission: Take Down Nikki'.

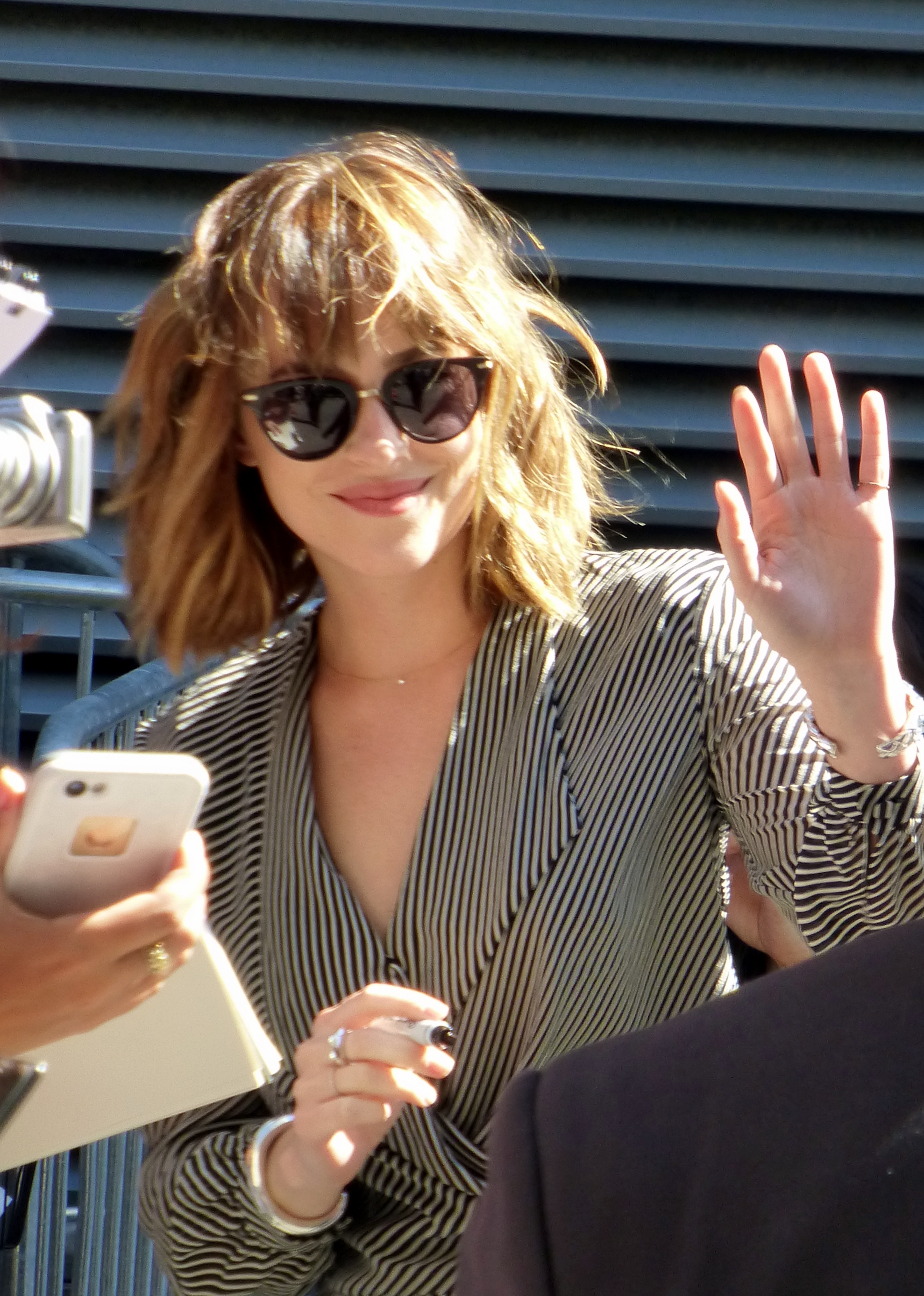
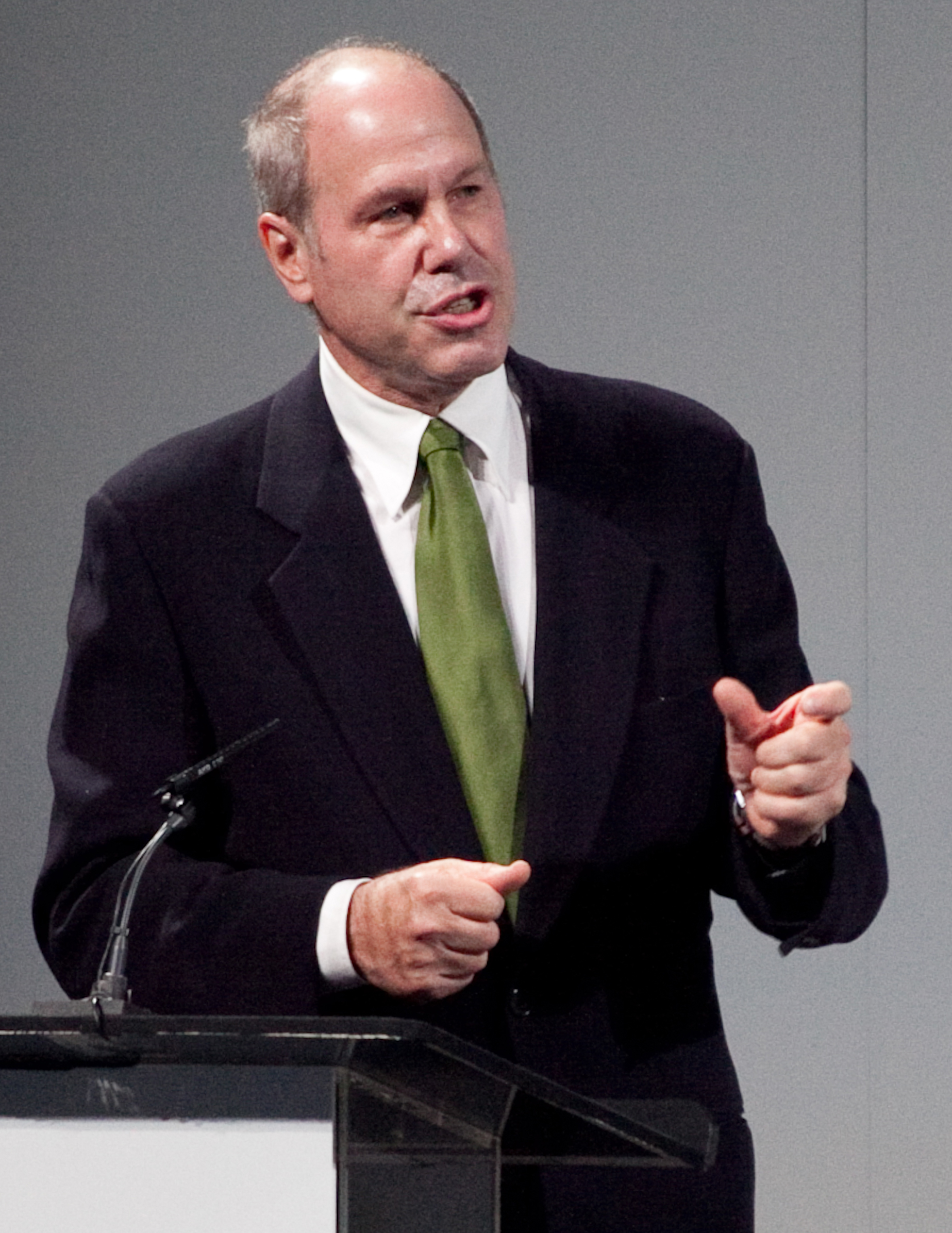
Sneider has disputed with Deadline Hollywood editor Mike Fleming Jr over "exclusive" story credits, including ones involving Dakota Johnson (left) and Michael Eisner (right).

Sneider disputed with Deadline's editor-in-chief Mike Fleming Jr in September 2013, regarding the casting of Dakota Johnson in the film Fifty Shades of Grey (2015), as author E. L. James chose to reveal it herself on Twitter. Fleming labeled his subsequently published story on the matter as an "exclusive" despite this, and Sneider was unhappy since he wrote a story days before the reveal which was rejected by TheWrap editors, who questioned his sourcing. The film's producer Dana Brunetti responded, criticizing Sneider's professionalism and his desire to be first. Sneider disputed with Fleming again in September 2014 regarding an "exclusive" scoop on a project by Michael Eisner's Tornante Company, asserting that Dave McNary of Variety had scooped the same information days before Fleming. Sneider and Fleming had come to be described as "nemeses" in the media. In May 2016, Sneider lost a scoop to Fleming about a planned film to be directed by Brett Ratner, The Libertine, that would have starred Johnny Depp. He blamed the public relations representative Simon Halls, disclosing screenshots of their emails together, and was asked to delete them. On May 11, Sneider tweeted that he was suspended from TheWrap without pay. Sneider had a tenure at Mashable starting in August, serving as senior film reporter.

=== Post-trades career, independent journalism, and public controversies (2016–present) ===
Sneider's tenure at Mashable ended in December 2016 after claiming that #OscarsSoWhite, a movement campaigning against racial bias in major acting awards, was "canceled" following people of color receiving consideration at the 89th Academy Awards. He posted this in a Mashable article and a subsequent tweet. Online backlash followed, with Sneider being criticized as he is a White man who attempted to declare a movement started by a Black woman as "dead". Mashable entertainment editor Josh Dickey expressed regret for the controversy, attaching a correction to the article and tweeting acceptance of responsibility; Sneider was unapologetic in his response, while Mashable's director of communications Paul Cafiero confirmed that this ordeal resulted in Sneider leaving the website.

Following his termination from Mashable, Sneider served as editor-in-chief of the Tracking Board from January 2017 to April 2018. In June 2018, Sneider joined Collider as Video News Director and a contributor to Movie Talk until August 2021. He contributed to Richard Rushfield's publication The Ankler from December 2021 to December 2022. Sneider served as editor-in-chief of Above the Line from September 2022 until leaving in October 2023, claiming publisher Patrick Graham owed him US$15,800. Sneider launched his independent newsletter The InSneider in November 2023, and co-hosts the weekly entertainment podcast The Hot Mic with film critic and content creator John Rocha, where they discuss Sneider's reports and rumors, as well as industry news and analysis.

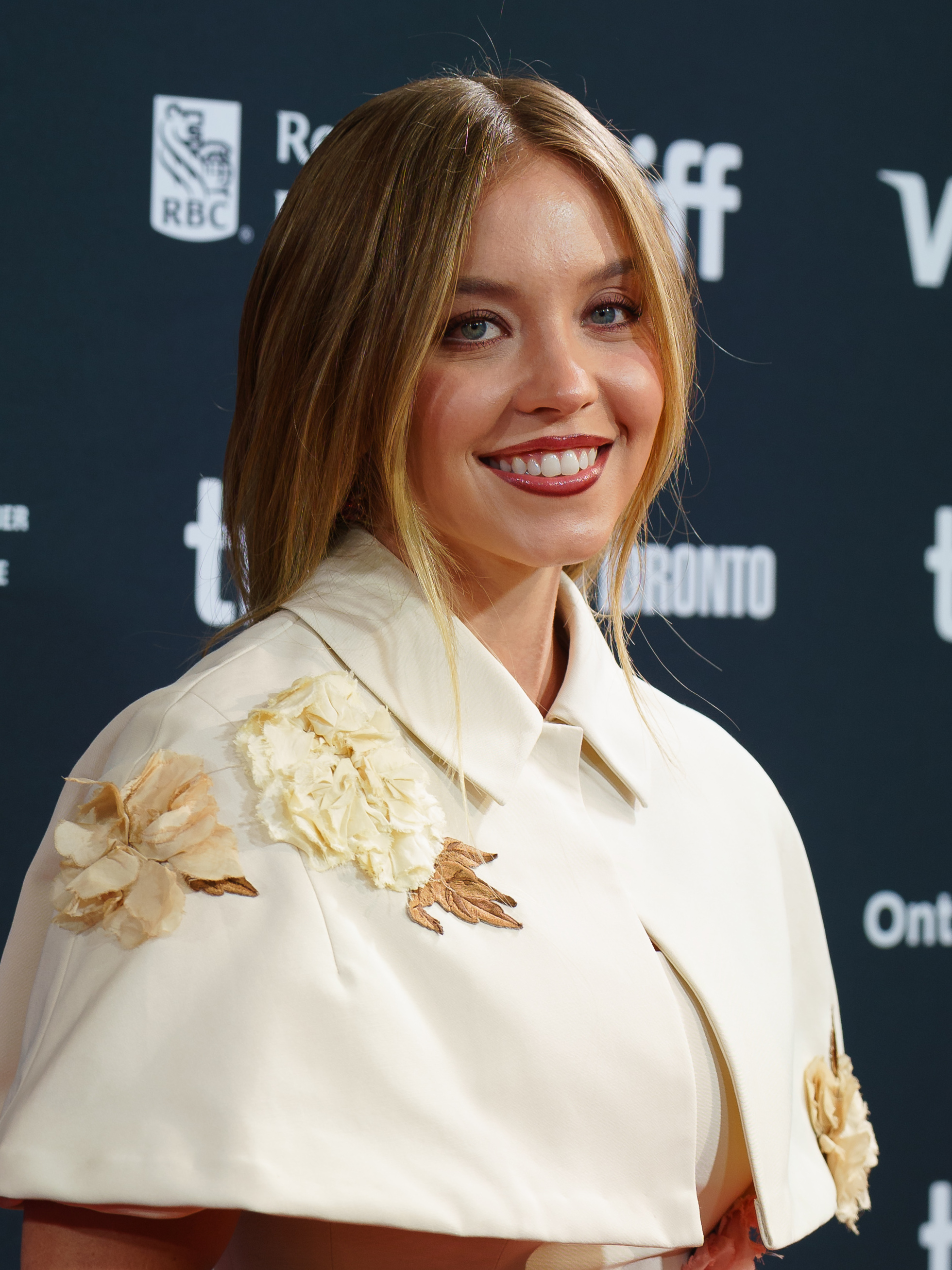
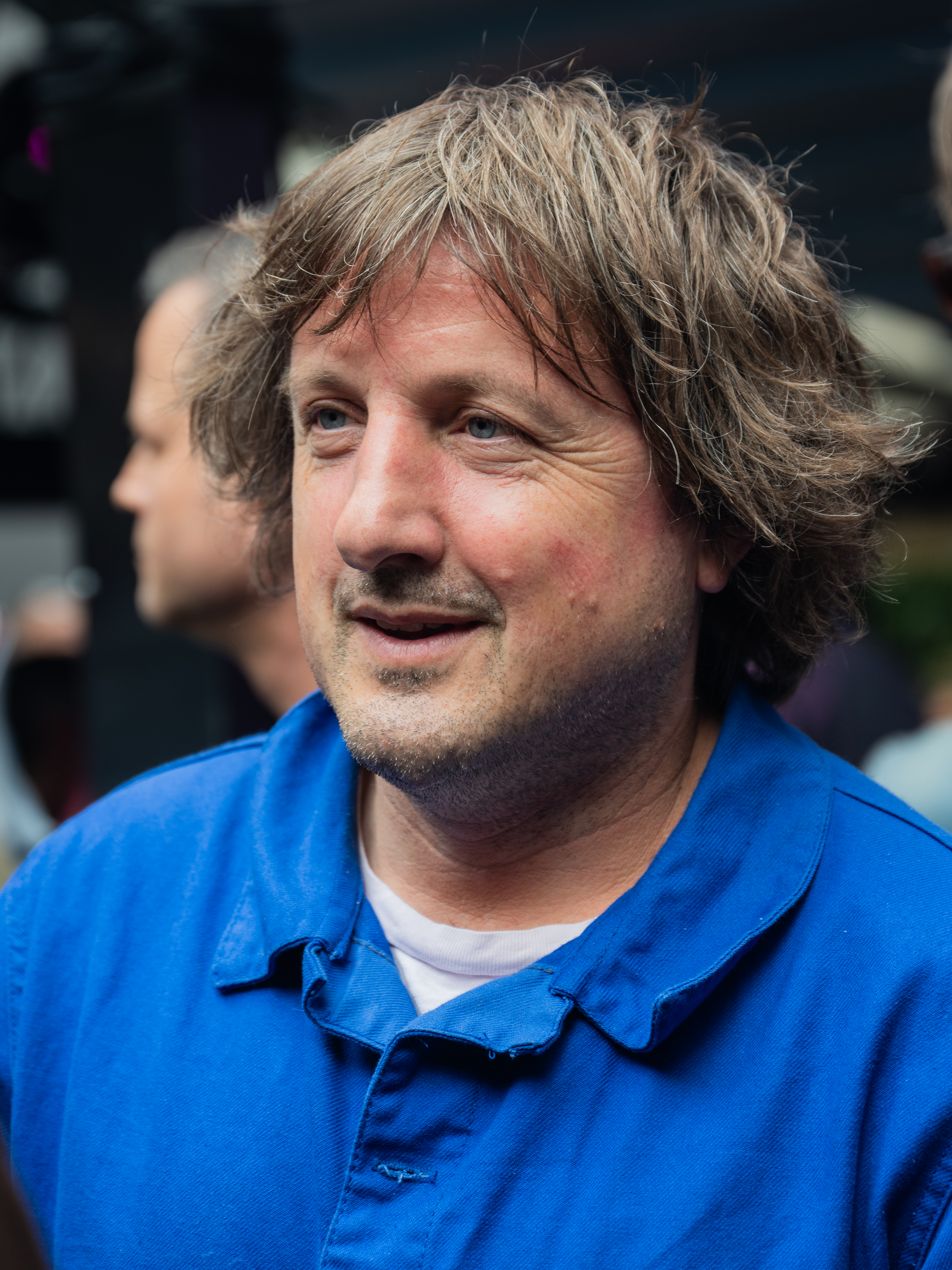
Jeff Sneider's publicized controversies have involved figures such as Sydney Sweeney, Christopher Miller, Daniel Pemberton, and Inde Navarrette.

Sneider started a rumor in March 2024 that actress Sydney Sweeney would star in the film Day Drinker (2027) with Johnny Depp, sparking online controversy. Sneider quote tweeted a tweet of denial from the actress, claiming it was a "non denial". Sneider claimed it was the fault of Sweeney's representatives, saying that the "mess" he caused by reporting what his sources told him was spoiling a "big Cannes [Film Festival] announcement". In September 2024, Sneider claimed that Sony Pictures scrapped the majority of the animated film Spider-Man: Beyond the Spider-Verse (2027) due to creative reasons and would not be released before 2027. Producer Christopher Miller denied the report on social media, and composer Daniel Pemberton disputed the accuracy of Sneider's Internet reporting. The film was later rescheduled for a 2027 release. Sneider reignited his feud with Fleming in late July 2026, who had become editor-at-large with Deadline, over a story about the termination of publishing rights to Call Me, I'll Hide The Body due to alleged artificial intelligence use in its writing. Sneider published his story on July 29, but Fleming's story on the matter published a day later was marked as an "exclusive". Sneider called Fleming out on X (formerly Twitter), with other journalists commenting, including Showbiz411 writer Roger Friedman who supported Sneider.

In September 2026, Sneider took issue with the representatives of actress Inde Navarrette, posting on X about wanting to write about her and offering to become "a useful friend" to Navarrette. Responses to his post were negative, with comments describing it as "creepy, unprofessional and inappropriate" according to PinkNews. Sneider received no attention from the representatives and threatened to publish indiscriminate, constant rumors about the actress if this continued. Sneider subsequently wrote in his newsletter that he had no personal feud with Navarrette; rather, he sought to "outsmart" her talent agency, the Creative Artists Agency (CAA), and be put on their radar so they would hire him. He jokingly compared himself to "Pat McAfee with Stephen A. Smith's hairline", and scrutinized some commenters who defended CAA, calling it "notoriously one of the biggest bullies in the world" for its reported association with Harvey Weinstein. Sneider later backtracked and apologized for his comments about Navarrette, blaming his ego and claiming he went overboard in his "victory celebration". He claimed his critics were "way worse" than he was, declared he would remain on social media "because we deserve each other", and claimed he received death threats or antisemitic comments, despite not referencing any examples, while no antisemitic comments appeared under his previous exchanges according to Complex. Salon wrote that the "individual moment" for Sneider was "a curiously nasty one", and further opined this incident was reflective of a broader trend of entitlement and contempt from Hollywood media figures against actresses. The controversy resulted in the Marvel Studios subreddit banning Sneider as a source for leaks and rumors.
