= List of biggest box-office bombs =

In the film and media industry, if a film released in theatres fails to break even by a large amount, it is considered a box-office bomb (or box-office flop), thus losing money for the distributor, studio, or production company that invested in it. Due to the secrecy surrounding costs and profit margins in the film industry, figures of losses are usually rough estimates at best, and there are often conflicting estimates over how much a film has lost. To accommodate this uncertainty, the losses are presented as ranges where this is the case, and the list is ordered alphabetically in the absence of a definitive order. Because the films on the list have been released over a large span of time, currency inflation is a material factor, so losses are adjusted for inflation using the United States Consumer Price Index to enable comparison at equivalent purchasing power. Many box office bombs are films with average or negative critical reception, which can contribute to low theater attendance, but critically-praised films may still become box office bombs for other reasons, such as expansive budgets or release timing with other films.

Some films on this list grossed more than their production budgets yet are still regarded as flops. This can be due to Hollywood accounting practices that manipulate profits or keep costs secret to circumvent profit-sharing agreements, but it is also possible for films to lose money legitimately even when the theatrical gross exceeds the budget. This is because a distributor does not collect the full gross, and the full cost of a film can substantially exceed its production budget once distribution and marketing are taken into account. For example, tax filings in 2010 for Cinemark Theatres show that only 54.5 percent of ticket revenues went to the distributor, with the exhibitor retaining the rest. While the distributor's cut will vary from film to film, a Hollywood studio will typically collect half the gross in the United States and less in other parts of the world. Marketing often represents a substantial share of the overall cost of the picture too: for a film with an average sized budget the promotion and advertising costs are typically half that of the production budget, and in the case of smaller films it is not unusual for the cost of the marketing to be higher than the production budget. In some cases, a company can make profits from a box-office bomb when ancillary revenues are taken into account, such as streaming, home media sales and rentals, television broadcast rights, and licensing fees, so a film that loses money at the box office can still eventually break even.

There are some films notorious for large production budgets and widely seen as box-office bombs that have either broken even or turned a profit. Cleopatra nearly bankrupted 20th Century Fox with production and marketing costs of US$44 million and numerous delays. It was among the top ten films of the 1960s, but still failed to recoup its investment during its theatrical release. It eventually broke even in 1966 when Fox sold the television broadcast rights to ABC for $5 million. The total costs for Waterworld (1995) exceeded $300 million and it was perceived as a disaster at the time, despite grossing $264 million worldwide. It also eventually broke even through other revenue streams. Such films are still cited as high-risk examples in evaluating the prospects of future productions. For example, Cleopatra is blamed for a decline in big-budget epic films in the 1960s.

The COVID-19 pandemic, starting around March 2020, caused temporary closure of movie theatres, and distributors moved several films to premier to streaming services such as HBO Max, Disney+, and Peacock with little to no box-office takes. While these films may have had successful runs on these services, the viewership or revenue from these showings are typically not reported and excluded from the box office. As a result, several films from 2020 to 2022 are included on this list, despite potentially having been profitable for their studios through streaming.

== Biggest box-office bombs ==
The following is a partial list of films that lost the most money, based on documented losses or estimated by expert analysis of various financial factors such as the production budget, marketing and distribution costs, gross box-office receipts and other ancillary revenues. The list is limited to films that are potentially among the highest box-office losses, adjusted for inflation (approximately upper-bound losses of $110 million or higher as of 2025).

† Background shading indicates films playing in the week commencing 6 November 2026 in theaters around the world.
§ indicates a film released for streaming less than 30 days after it was released theatrically.

Films that have accumulated the highest financial losses over full distribution lifecycle
Title	Year	Net production budget (millions)	Worldwide gross (millions)	Estimated loss (millions)		Ref.
Title	Year	Net production budget (millions)	Worldwide gross (millions)	Nominal	Adjusted for inflation	(Note: 1634–1699: McCusker, J. J. (1997). How Much Is That in Real Money? A Historical Price Index for Use as a Deflator of Money Values in the Economy of the United States: Addenda et Corrigenda (PDF). American Antiquarian Society. 1700–1799: McCusker, J. J. (1992). How Much Is That in Real Money? A Historical Price Index for Use as a Deflator of Money Values in the Economy of the United States (PDF). American Antiquarian Society. 1800–present: Federal Reserve Bank of Minneapolis. "Consumer Price Index (estimate) 1800–".)
The 13th Warrior	1999	$100–160	$61.7	$69–129	$133–249	(Note: The 13th Warrior: Total worldwide gross: "The 13th Warrior (1999)". Box Office Mojo.; Production budget: Sklar, Elizabeth S. (2011). The Vikings on Film: Essays on Depictions of the Nordic Middle Ages. McFarland & Company. p. 122. ISBN 9780786460441. "Despite a lavish production budget for which estimates range from $100 to $160..."; Estimated loss: Greatest Film Flops (Filmsite))
47 Ronin	2013	$175–225	$151.8	$96	$133	(Note: 47 Ronin: Total worldwide gross: "47 Ronin (2013)". Box Office Mojo.; Production budget: Lee, Chris (December 25, 2013). "Troubled '47 Ronin' may be headed for a box office reckoning". Los Angeles Times.; Estimated loss: "Biggest Money Losers, Based on Absolute Loss on Worldwide Earnings". The Numbers. Nash Information Services. Archived from the original on May 31, 2022.)
The Adventures of Pluto Nash	2002	$100	$7.1	$96	$172	(Note: The Adventures of Pluto Nash: Total worldwide gross: "The Adventures of Pluto Nash (2002)". Box Office Mojo.; Production budget: Stewart, Andrew (August 11, 2012). "B.O. reality gets lost in perception". Variety.; Estimated loss: Greatest Film Flops (Filmsite))
The Adventures of Rocky & Bullwinkle	2000	$76–98.6	$35.1	$63.5	$119	(Note: The Adventures of Rocky & Bullwinkle: Total worldwide gross and production budget: "The Adventures of Rocky & Bullwinkle (2000)". Box Office Mojo.; Production budget and estimated loss: Greatest Film Flops (Filmsite))
The Alamo	2004	$107	$25.8	$94	$160	(Note: The Alamo: Total worldwide gross: "The Alamo (2004)". Box Office Mojo.; Production budget: Waxman, Sharon (March 24, 2004). "A Battle Disney May Never Forget; For 'The Alamo,' a Long and Bumpy Road, From Conception to Release". The New York Times.; Estimated loss: Greatest Film Flops (Filmsite))
Alexander	2004	$155	$167.3	$71	$121	(Note: Alexander: Total worldwide gross: "Alexander (2004)". Box Office Mojo.; Production budget: Waxman, Sharon (November 20, 2004). "Breaking Ground With a Gay Movie Hero". The New York Times.; Estimated loss: Greatest Film Flops (Filmsite))
Ali	2001	$107	$87.7	$63	$115	(Note: Ali: Total worldwide gross and production budget: "Ali (2001)". Box Office Mojo.; Estimated loss: Greatest Film Flops (Filmsite))
Allied	2016	$85	$118.6	$75–90	$101–121	(Note: Allied: Total worldwide gross and production budget: "Allied (2016)". Box Office Mojo.; Expected loss: McClintock (2016))
Amsterdam	2022	$80	$31.2	$108	$119	(Note: Amsterdam: Total worldwide gross: "Amsterdam (2022)". Box Office Mojo.; Production budget and estimated loss: D'Alessandro (2023))
Around the World in 80 Days	2004	$110	$72.2	$74	$126	(Note: Around the World in 80 Days: Total worldwide gross: "Around the World in 80 Days (2004)". Box Office Mojo.; Production budget: Harris, Dana (January 12, 2003). "Inside Move: On Walden bond". Variety.; Estimated loss: Greatest Film Flops (Filmsite))
The Astronaut's Wife	1999	$75	$19.6	$65	$126	(Note: The Astronaut's Wife: Total worldwide gross and production budget: "The Astronaut's Wife (1999)". Box Office Mojo.; Estimated loss: Greatest Film Flops (Filmsite))
Ballistic: Ecks vs. Sever	2002	$70	$19.9	$70.1	$125	(Note: Ballistic: Total worldwide gross and production budget: "Ballistic: Ecks vs. Sever (2002)". Box Office Mojo.; Estimated loss: Greatest Film Flops (Filmsite))
Battlefield Earth	2000	$73–103	$29.7	$73.3	$137	(Note: Battlefield Earth: Total worldwide gross and production budget: "Battlefield Earth (2000)". Box Office Mojo.; Estimated loss and production budget: Greatest Film Flops (Filmsite))
Battleship	2012	$209–220	$303	$58–150	$81–210	(Note: Battleship: Total worldwide gross and production budget: "Battleship". Box Office Mojo. IMDb.; Estimated loss (upper-bound) and production budget: Masters, Kim (May 23, 2012). "'Battleship' Fallout: Lessons From a Box Office Sinking (Analysis)". The Hollywood Reporter.; Estimated loss (lower-bound): "Biggest Money Losers, Based on Absolute Loss on Worldwide Earnings". The Numbers. Nash Information Services. Archived from the original on March 12, 2014.)
Beloved	1998	$80	$22.9	$68.5	$135	(Note: Beloved: Canadian and U.S. gross and production budget: "Beloved (1998)". Box Office Mojo.; Estimated loss: Greatest Film Flops (Filmsite))
Ben-Hur	2016	$100	$94.1	$75–120	$101–161	(Note: Ben-Hur: Total worldwide gross and production budget: "Ben-Hur (2016)". Box Office Mojo.; Expected loss (lower-bound): Sakoui, Anousha (September 1, 2016). "Hollywood's Summertime Bombs Got a Lot More Disastrous This Year". Bloomberg News. Archived from the original on September 1, 2016.; Expected loss (upper-bound): McClintock (2016))
The BFG	2016	$140	$179.6	$71–100	$95–134	(Note: The BFG: Total worldwide gross and production budget: "The BFG (2016)". Box Office Mojo.; Estimated loss (lower-bound): "Biggest Money Losers, Based on Absolute Loss on Worldwide Earnings". The Numbers. Nash Information Services. Archived from the original on June 5, 2017.; Expected loss (upper-bound): McClintock (2016))
Black Adam	2022	$190–260	$393	$50–100	$55–110	(Note: Black Adam: Total worldwide gross: "Black Adam". Box Office Mojo.; Production budget: Couch, Aaron; Kit, Borys (December 20, 2022). "'Black Adam 2' Not Moving Forward as Part of New DC's "First Chapter"". The Hollywood Reporter.; Estimated loss: Franklin, Grant (December 5, 2022). ""Black Adam" Could Lose $50-100 Million". Dark Horizons.)
Blackhat	2015	$70	$19.7	$68–90	$92–122	(Note: Blackhat: Total worldwide gross and production budget: "Blackhat (2015)". Box Office Mojo.; Estimated loss (lower-bound): "Biggest Money Losers, Based on Absolute Loss on Worldwide Earnings". The Numbers. Nash Information Services. Archived from the original on May 29, 2016.; Estimated loss (upper-bound): Graser (2015))
Borderlands	2024	$120	$33	$80–112	$82–115	(Note: Borderlands: Total worldwide gross: "Borderlands (2024)". Box Office Mojo.; Production budget and estimated loss (lower-bound): D'Alessandro (2025); Estimated loss (upper-bound): Biggest Money Losers (The Numbers))
The Call of the Wild	2020	$125–150	$107.6	$50–100	$62–124	(Note: The Call of the Wild: Total worldwide gross: "The Call of the Wild". Box Office Mojo.; Production budget: Pamela McClintock (February 20, 2020). "Box Office Preview: 'Sonic the Hedgehog' to Leave 'Call of the Wild' Out in the Cold". The Hollywood Reporter.; Expected loss (lower-bound): Rebecca Rubin (March 1, 2020). "Harrison Ford's 'Call of the Wild' to Lose $50 Million at Box Office". Variety.; Expected loss (upper-bound): D'Alessandro, Anthony (February 23, 2020). "'Hedgehog' Bites Back At 'Wild' Dog As 'Sonic' Speeds To No. 1 With $26M+; $203M+ WW – Sunday AM Update". Deadline Hollywood.)
Cats	2019	$90–100	$73.7	$71–113.6	$89–143	(Note: Cats: Total worldwide gross: "Cats". Box Office Mojo.; Lower-bound production budget and loss: D'Alessandro, Anthony (December 29, 2019). "'Cats' Bound To Lose At Least $71M After All Ancillaries: Here's How". Deadline Hollywood.; Upper-bound production budget and loss: D'Alessandro (2020))
Chaos Walking	2021	$100	$26.5	$112	$133	(Note: Chaos Walking: Total worldwide gross: "Chaos Walking (2021)". Box Office Mojo.; Production budget: D'Alessandro, Anthony (February 7, 2020). "'Chaos Walking': Daisy Ridley-Tom Holland Pic Gets Release Date". Deadline. Archived from the original on February 12, 2020.; Estimated loss: "Biggest Money Losers, Based on Absolute Loss on Worldwide Earnings". The Numbers. Nash Information Services. Archived from the original on May 1, 2024.)
Chill Factor	1999	$34–70	$11.8	$64	$124	(Note: Chill Factor: Canadian and U.S. gross and production budget (upper-bound): "Chill Factor (1999)". Box Office Mojo.; Estimated production budget (lower-bound): "Chill Factor". The Numbers.; Estimated loss (based on upper-bound budget): Greatest Film Flops (Filmsite))
A Christmas Carol	2009	$175–200	$325.3	$50–100	$75–150	(Note: A Christmas Carol: Total worldwide gross and production budget: "A Christmas Carol (2009)". Box Office Mojo. Archived from the original on November 29, 2009.; Production budget: Barnes, Brooks (October 26, 2009). "Disney Hopes Christmas Carol Lives Up to Its Blockbuster Marketing". The New York Times. Archived from the original on November 25, 2011.; Estimated loss: Eller, Claudia (November 10, 2009). "Disney Studios president leaves". Los Angeles Times.)
The Chronicles of Riddick	2004	$105–120	$115.8	$47–73	$80–124	(Note: The Chronicles of Riddick: Total worldwide gross: "The Chronicles of Riddick (2004)". Box Office Mojo.; Production budget and estimated loss: Greatest Film Flops (Filmsite))
Cutthroat Island (Note: Cutthroat Island was once listed as having the "largest box office loss" by Guinness World Records but the category has since been retired.)	1995	$98	$18.3	$105	$222	(Note: Cutthroat Island: Total worldwide gross: "Cutthroat Island". The Numbers. Nash Information Services.; Production budget: Hindes, Andrew (January 11, 1999). "Arnold outbonds 'em". Variety.; Estimated loss: "Largest Box Office Loss". Guinness World Records. April 30, 2012.)
Dark Phoenix	2019	$200	$252.4	$79–133	$101–171	(Note: Dark Phoenix: Total worldwide gross: "Dark Phoenix (2019)". Box Office Mojo.; Production budget and estimated loss (upper-bound): D'Alessandro (2020); Estimated loss (lower-bound): Biggest Money Losers (The Numbers))
Deepwater Horizon	2016	$110–120	$119.5	$60–113	$80–152	(Note: Deepwater Horizon: Total worldwide gross: "Deepwater Horizon (2016)". Box Office Mojo.; Production budget: McClintock, Pamela (October 3, 2016). "Box-Office Analysis: Can 'Deepwater Horizon' Be Rescued". The Hollywood Reporter.; Expected loss (lower-bound): McClintock (2016); Estimated loss (upper-bound): Biggest Money Losers (The Numbers))
Devotion	2022	$90	$21.8	$89–104	$98–114	(Note: Devotion: Total worldwide gross: "Devotion (2022)". Box Office Mojo.; Production budget and estimated loss (lower-bound): D'Alessandro (2023); Estimated loss (upper-bound): Biggest Money Losers (The Numbers))
Dolittle	2020	$175	$227.9	$50–100	$62–124	(Note: Dolittle (2020): Total world gross and production budget: "Dolittle". Box Office Mojo.; Estimated loss (lower-bound): D'Alessandro, Anthony (January 20, 2020). "How Sony Built 'Bad Boys For Life' Into A Success With $101M+ WW & $73M+ U.S.; 'Dolittle' Poised For $50M+ Loss – Monday Update". Deadline Hollywood.; Estimated loss (upper-bound): Fuster, Jeremy (January 19, 2020). "Robert Downey Jr's 'Dolittle' Could Lose $100 Million at Box Office". TheWrap.)
Driven	2001	$94	$54.7	$67	$122	(Note: Driven: Total worldwide gross and production budget: "Driven (2001)". Box Office Mojo.; Estimated loss: Greatest Film Flops (Filmsite))
Dudley Do-Right	1999	$70	$10	$65	$126	(Note: Dudley Do-Right: Canadian and U.S. gross and production budget: "Dudley Do-Right (1999)". Box Office Mojo.; Estimated loss: Greatest Film Flops (Filmsite))
Evan Almighty	2007	$175	$173.4	$87	$135	(Note: Evan Almighty: Total worldwide gross: "Evan Almighty (2007)". Box Office Mojo.; Production budget: McClintock, Pamela; Fleming, Michael (June 25, 2007). "'Evan' struggles to find right audience". Variety.; Estimated loss: "Biggest Money Losers, Based on Absolute Loss on Worldwide Earnings". The Numbers. Nash Information Services. Archived from the original on December 18, 2021.)
The Fall of the Roman Empire	1964	$18.4	$4.8	$14.3	$148	(Note: The Fall of the Roman Empire: Canadian and U.S. gross: "The Fall of the Roman Empire (1964)". The Numbers. Nash Information Services.; Production budget: The New York Times. August 6, 1965. "$18,436,625"; Estimated loss: Greatest Film Flops (Filmsite))
Fantastic Four	2015	$120–125	$168	$80–100	$109–136	(Note: Fantastic Four: Total worldwide gross and production budget: "Fantastic Four (2015)". Box Office Mojo.; Expected loss and production budget: McClintock (2015))
Fathers' Day	1997	$85	$35.7	$67	$134	(Note: Father's Day: Total worldwide gross: and production budget: "Fathers' Day (1997)". The Numbers. Nash Information Services.; Estimated loss: Greatest Film Flops (Filmsite))
Final Fantasy: The Spirits Within	2001	$137	$85.1	$94	$171	(Note: Final Fantasy: The Spirits Within: Total worldwide gross and production budget: "Final Fantasy: The Spirit Within (2001)". Box Office Mojo.; Production budget: Bolton, Christopher; Istvan Csicsery-Ronay Jr; Takayuki Tatsumi (2007). "10". Robot Ghosts and Wired Dreams: Japanese Science Fiction from Origins to Anime. University of Minnesota Press. ISBN 978-0-8166-4974-7.; Estimated loss: Greatest Film Flops (Filmsite))
The Flash	2023	$200	$271.3	$155	$164	(Note: Flash: Total worldwide gross: "The Flash". Box Office Mojo. IMDb.; Production budget and estimated loss: D'Alessandro (2024))
Flushed Away	2006	$149	$178.3	$109	$174	(Note: Flushed Away: Total worldwide gross and production budget: "Flushed Away (2006)". Box Office Mojo.; Estimated loss: Fritz, Ben (February 7, 2007). "'Flushed' drains DreamWorks". Variety.)
Furiosa: A Mad Max Saga	2024	$168	$174.2	$119.6	$123	(Note: Furiosa: A Mad Max Saga: Total worldwide gross: "Furiosa: A Mad Max Saga (2024)". Box Office Mojo. IMDb.; Production budget and estimated loss: D'Alessandro (2025))
Gemini Man	2019	$138	$173.5	$111.1	$140	(Note: Gemini Man: Total worldwide gross and production budget: "Gemini Man (2019)". Box Office Mojo. IMDb.; Expected loss: D'Alessandro (2020))
Ghost in the Shell	2017	$110–180	$169.8	$60–100	$79–131	(Note: Ghost in the Shell: Total worldwide gross: "Ghost in the Shell (2017)". Box Office Mojo.; Production budget and expected loss: Rainey, James (April 5, 2017). "'Ghost In The Shell' Will Lose $60 Million-Plus: Here's Why". Deadline Hollywood.)
Gigli	2003	$75.6	$7.3	$72	$126	(Note: Gigli: Total worldwide gross: "Gigli (2003)". Box Office Mojo.; Production budget: Lang & Waxman (2011); Estimated loss: Greatest Film Flops (Filmsite))
Gods of Egypt	2016	$140	$150.7	$76–90	$102–121	(Note: Gods of Egypt: Total worldwide gross and production budget: "Gods of Egypt (2016)". Box Office Mojo.; Estimated loss (lower-bound): Biggest Money Losers (The Numbers); Expected loss (upper-bound): McClintock (2016))
The Good Dinosaur	2015	$175–200	$332.2	$85	$115	(Note: The Good Dinosaur: Total worldwide gross: "The Good Dinosaur (2015)". Box Office Mojo.; Production budget: Faughnder, Ryan (November 24, 2015). "'Good Dinosaur' and 'Creed' to battle 'Hunger Games' at holiday box office". Los Angeles Times.; Expected loss: McClintock, Pamela (January 22, 2016). "'Good Dinosaur': Analyzing Pixar's First Box-Office Disaster". The Hollywood Reporter. Archived from the original on July 1, 2020.)
The Great Raid	2005	$80	$10.8	$75	$124	(Note: The Great Raid: Total worldwide gross: "The Great Raid (2005)". Box Office Mojo.; Production budget: "Escape from limbo-land". Variety. July 17, 2005.; Estimated loss: Greatest Film Flops (Filmsite))
Green Lantern	2011	$200	$219.9	$75–90	$107–129	(Note: Green Lantern: Total worldwide gross: "Green Lantern (2011)". Box Office Mojo.; Production budget: Stewart, Andrew (June 16, 2011). "'Green Lantern' looks to shine at box office". Variety.; Estimated loss (lower-bound): "Biggest Money Losers, Based on Absolute Loss on Worldwide Earnings". The Numbers. Nash Information Services. Archived from the original on November 15, 2017.; Expected loss (upper-bound): Greatest Film Flops (Filmsite))
Hard Rain	1998	$70	$19.9	$60	$119	(Note: Hard Rain: Canadian and U.S. gross and production budget: "Hard Rain (1998)". Box Office Mojo.; Estimated loss: Greatest Film Flops (Filmsite))
Hart's War	2002	$70–95	$32.3	$62.7	$112	(Note: Hart's War: Total worldwide gross and production budget: "Hart's War (2002)". Box Office Mojo.; Estimated loss and production budget: Greatest Film Flops (Filmsite))
Haunted Mansion	2023	$150	$117.4	$117–126	$124–133	(Note: Haunted Mansion: Total worldwide gross: "Haunted Mansion". Box Office Mojo. IMDb.; Production budget and estimated loss (lower-bound): D'Alessandro (2024); Estimates loss (upper-bound): Biggest Money Losers (The Numbers))
Heaven's Gate	1980	$44	$3.5	$40.5	$158	(Note: Heaven's Gate: Canadian and U.S. gross and production budget: "Heaven's Gate (1980)". Box Office Mojo.; Estimated loss: Greatest Film Flops (Filmsite))
Home on the Range	2004	$110	$76.5	$71.8	$122	(Note: Home on the Range: Total worldwide gross and production budget: "Home on the Range (2004)". The Numbers.; Estimated loss: "Biggest Money Losers, Based on Absolute Loss on Worldwide Gross". The Numbers. Nash Information Services. Archived from the original on February 5, 2010.)
How Do You Know	2010	$100	$48.7	$104	$154	(Note: How Do You Know: Total worldwide gross: "How Do You Know (2010)". Box Office Mojo.; Production budget: Masters, Kim (December 9, 2010). "EXCLUSIVE: 'How Do You Know' Price Tag: $120 Million, $50 Million Just for Talent". The Hollywood Reporter. "THR has learned that the film, which centers on a love triangle, cost $120 million to make, though the studio drove that down to about $100 million thanks to tax rebates from Pennsylvania and D.C."; Estimated loss: "Biggest Money Losers, Based on Absolute Loss on Worldwide Earnings". The Numbers. Nash Information Services. Archived from the original on May 1, 2024.)
Hudson Hawk	1991	$65	$17.2	$47.8	$113	(Note: Hudson Hawk: Canadian and U.S. gross and production budget: "Hudson Hawk (1991)". Box Office Mojo.; Estimated loss: Greatest Film Flops (Filmsite))
Hugo	2011	$150–170	$185.8	$91	$130	(Note: Hugo: Total worldwide gross: "Hugo (2012)". Box Office Mojo.; Production budget: Kaufman, Amy (November 22, 2011). "Movie Projector: 'Breaking Dawn' to devour three new family films". Los Angeles Times.; Estimated loss: "Biggest Money Losers, Based on Absolute Loss on Worldwide Earnings". The Numbers. Nash Information Services. Archived from the original on March 11, 2022.)
Inchon	1981	$46	$5.2	$40.8	$144	(Note: Inchon: Canadian and U.S. gross: "Inchon (1982)". Box Office Mojo.; Estimated loss: Greatest Film Flops (Filmsite))
Indiana Jones and the Dial of Destiny	2023	$326	$384	$135–143	$143–151	(Note: Indiana Jones and the Dial of Destiny: Total worldwide gross and production budget: "Indiana Jones whips up $130 million loss for disney". Forbes. March 31, 2024.; Estimated loss (lower-bound): Biggest Money Losers (The Numbers); Estimated loss (upper-bound): D'Alessandro (2024))
Instinct	1999	$80	$34.1	$63	$122	(Note: Instinct: Canadian and U.S. gross and production budget: "Instinct (1999)". Box Office Mojo.; Estimated loss: Greatest Film Flops (Filmsite))
The Invasion	2007	$80	$40	$71	$110	(Note: The Invasion: Total worldwide gross and production budget: "The Invasion (2007)". Box Office Mojo.; Estimated loss: "Biggest Money Losers, Based on Absolute Loss on Worldwide Earnings". The Numbers. Nash Information Services. Archived from the original on June 5, 2017.)
Ishtar	1987	$51–55	$14.4	$40.6	$115	(Note: Ishtar: Canadian and U.S. gross and budget: "Ishtar (1987)". Box Office Mojo.; Production budget: Harmetz, Aljean (May 19, 1987). "Elaine May's 'Ishtar': A $51 Million Film in Trouble". The New York Times.; Estimated loss: Greatest Film Flops (Filmsite))
Jack Frost	1998	$40–85	$34.6	$68	$134	(Note: Jack Frost: Canadian and U.S. gross and production budget: "Jack Frost (1998)". Box Office Mojo.; Production budget: Andrew Hindes (December 20, 1998). "'Mail' shows a prophet". Variety.; Estimated loss: Greatest Film Flops (Filmsite))
Jack the Giant Slayer	2013	$185–200	$197.7	$103	$142	(Note: Jack the Giant Slayer: Total worldwide gross: "Jack the Giant Slayer (2013)". Box Office Mojo.; Production budget: Smith, Grady (February 28, 2013). "Box office preview: 'Jack the Giant Slayer' hopes to climb higher than '21 And Over'". Entertainment Weekly.; Estimated loss: "Biggest Money Losers, Based on Absolute Loss on Worldwide Earnings". The Numbers. Nash Information Services. Archived from the original on May 1, 2024.)
John Carter	2012	$263.7	$284.1	$112–200	$157–280	(Note: John Carter: Total worldwide gross: "John Carter (2012)". Box Office Mojo.; Production budget: Sylt, Christian (October 22, 2014). "Revealed: The $307 Million Cost of Disney's John Carter". Forbes. "The tax payment to John Carter gave the picture a net budget of $263.7 million which is far more than estimates predicted."; Estimated loss (lower-bound): Biggest Money Losers (The Numbers); Expected loss (upper-bound): Chmielewski, Dawn C. (March 20, 2012). "Disney expects $200-million loss on 'John Carter'". Los Angeles Times.)
Joker: Folie à Deux	2024	$190–200	$206.4	$144.3	$148	(Note: Joker 2: Total worldwide gross: "Joker: Folie á Deux (2024)". Box Office Mojo. IMDb.; Production budget: Lower-bound: D'Alessandro, Anthony; Tartaglione, Nancy (October 1, 2024). "Can Lady Gaga & Joaquin Phoenix's Joker: Folie à Deux Go Nuts At The Box Office? $140M Global Start Eyed – Preview". Deadline Hollywood. Archived from the original on October 1, 2024.; Upper-bound: Rubin, Rebecca (October 14, 2024). "'Joker: Folie à Deux' to Lose $150 Million to $200 Million in Theatrical Run After Bombing at Box Office". Variety.; Estimated loss: D'Alessandro (2025))
Jungle Cruise §	2021	$200	$220.9	$150	$178	(Note: Jungle Cruise: Total worldwide gross: "Jungle Cruise (2021)". Box Office Mojo.; Production budget: Keegan, Rebecca (July 21, 2021). "How Dwayne Johnson Wooed Emily Blunt for 'Jungle Cruise' — and Why She Ghosted Him". The Hollywood Reporter. Archived from the original on July 26, 2021.; Estimated loss: Biggest Money Losers (The Numbers))
Jupiter Ascending	2015	$175	$184	$95–120	$129–163	(Note: Jupiter Ascending: Total worldwide gross: "Jupiter Ascending (2015)". Box Office Mojo.; Production budget: McNary, Dave (February 4, 2015). "Box Office: 'Spongebob' to Mop the Floor With 'Jupiter Ascending,' 'Seventh Son' For $35 Million". Variety.; Estimated loss (lower-bound): "Biggest Money Losers, Based on Absolute Loss on Worldwide Earnings". The Numbers. Nash Information Services. Archived from the original on May 31, 2022.; Estimated loss (upper-bound): McClintock, Pamela (June 10, 2015). "Disney Could Lose $140 Million on 'Tomorrowland' Flop". The Hollywood Reporter.)
K-19: The Widowmaker	2002	$100	$65.7	$67	$120	(Note: K-19: The Widowmaker: Total worldwide gross: "K-19: The Widowmaker (2002)". Box Office Mojo.; Production budget: Welkos, Robert W. (March 4, 2001). "Venturing Into Rough Seas". Los Angeles Times.; Estimated loss: Greatest Film Flops (Filmsite))
King Arthur: Legend of the Sword	2017	$175	$148.7	$112–153.2	$147–201	(Note: King Arthur: Legend of the Sword: Total worldwide gross and production budget: "King Arthur: Legend of the Sword (2017)". Box Office Mojo.; Expected loss (lower-bound): "Biggest Money Losers, Based on Absolute Loss on Worldwide Earnings". The Numbers. Nash Information Services. Archived from the original on May 1, 2024.; Expected loss (upper-bound): D'Alessandro (2018))
The Last Duel	2021	$100	$30.6	$99	$118	(Note: The Last Duel: Total worldwide gross: "The Last Duel". Box Office Mojo.; Production budget: Lang, Brent (October 17, 2021). "Box Office: 'Halloween Kills' Scores Bloody Great $50.4 Million Debut, 'The Last Duel' Bombs". Variety.; Estimated loss: "Biggest Money Losers, Based on Absolute Loss on Worldwide Earnings". The Numbers. Nash Information Services. Archived from the original on May 31, 2022.)
Lightyear	2022	$200	$226.4	$106–122	$117–134	(Note: Lightyear: Total worldwide gross: "Lightyear". Box Office Mojo.; Production budget and estimated loss (lower-bound): D'Alessandro (2023); Estimated loss (upper-bound): Biggest Money Losers (The Numbers))
Lolita	1997	$62	$1.1	$61	$122	(Note: Lolita: Canadian and U.S. gross and production budget: "Lolita (1997)". Box Office Mojo.; Estimated loss: Greatest Film Flops (Filmsite))
The Lone Ranger	2013	$225–250	$260.5	$160–190	$221–263	(Note: The Lone Ranger: Total worldwide gross: "The Lone Ranger (2013)". Box Office Mojo.; Production budget: Graser, Marc (June 25, 2013). "Disney, Jerry Bruckheimer See 'Lone Ranger' as New Genre-Bending Superhero". Variety. "The picture cost approximately $250 million to produce... Studio reps say the pic cost around $225 million, but sources say it was considerably higher."; Estimated loss: Acuna, Kirsten (August 6, 2013). "Disney Predicts It Will Lose Between $160-$190 Million On 'The Lone Ranger' Bomb". Business Insider.)
Mars Needs Moms	2011	$150	$39	$100–144	$143–206	(Note: Mars Needs Moms: Total worldwide gross: "Mars Needs Moms (2011)". Box Office Mojo.; Production budget: Graser, Marc (May 10, 2011). "'Mars' flop dents Disney earnings". Variety.; Estimated loss (lower-bound): Barnes, Brooks (March 14, 2011). "Many Culprits in Fall of a Family Film". The New York Times.; Estimated loss (upper-bound): Biggest Money Losers (The Numbers))
The Marvels	2023	$270	$206.1	$194–237	$205–250	(Note: The Marvels: Total worldwide gross: "The Marvels". Box Office Mojo. IMDb.; Production budget and estimated loss (upper-bound): D'Alessandro (2024); Estimated loss (lower-bound): Biggest Money Losers (The Numbers))
The Matrix Resurrections §	2021	$190	$156.5	$130	$154	(Note: The Matrix Resurrections: Total worldwide gross: "The Matrix Resurrections (2021)". Box Office Mojo. IMDb.; Production budget: Malhotra, Rahul (January 2, 2022). "'The Matrix Resurrections' Crosses $100 Million Worldwide Even Before China Release". Collider.; Estimated loss: Biggest Money Losers (The Numbers))
Missing Link	2019	$102.3	$26.2	$101.3	$128	(Note: Missing Link: Total worldwide gross: "Missing Link (2019)". Box Office Mojo. IMDb.; Production budget and estimated loss: D'Alessandro (2020))
Monkeybone	2001	$75	$7.6	$71	$129	(Note: Monkeybone: Total worldwide gross: "Monkeybone (2001)". Box Office Mojo.; Production budget: Thielman, Sam (February 6, 2009). "Selick puts stop motion in Focus". Variety.; Estimated loss: Greatest Film Flops (Filmsite))
Monster Trucks	2016	$125	$64.5	$108–123.1	$145–165	(Note: Monster Trucks: Total worldwide gross: "Monster Trucks". Box Office Mojo.; Production budget: Faughnder, Ryan (January 13, 2017). "2017's first big flop? How Paramount's 'Monster Trucks' went awry". Los Angeles Times.; Estimated loss (lower-bound): "Biggest Money Losers, Based on Absolute Loss on Worldwide Earnings". The Numbers. Nash Information Services. Archived from the original on May 1, 2024.; Estimated loss (upper-bound): D'Alessandro (2018))
Moonfall	2022	$138	$67.3	$138	$152	(Note: Moonfall: Total worldwide gross: "Moonfall". Box Office Mojo.; Production budget: McClintock, Pamela (February 4, 2022). "Box Office: Jackass Forever Laughs Hard With $1.7M in Previews". The Hollywood Reporter.; Estimated loss: Biggest Money Losers (The Numbers))
Mortal Engines	2018	$110	$83.7	$174.8	$224	(Note: Mortal Engines: Total worldwide gross: "Mortal Engines (2018)". Box Office Mojo.; Production budget and estimated loss: D'Alessandro (2019))
Mulan §	2020	$200	$66.8	$141	$175	(Note: Mulan: Total worldwide gross: "Mulan (2020)". Box Office Mojo.; Production budget: Pallotta, Frank (February 14, 2020). "Disney's 'Mulan' was supposed to be a big hit in China. The coronavirus could threaten that". CNN Business. Archived from the original on February 14, 2020.; Estimated loss: Biggest Money Losers (The Numbers))
The Mummy	2017	$195	$410	$60–95	$79–125	(Note: The Mummy: Total worldwide gross: "The Mummy (2017)". The Numbers.; Production budget and estimated loss: D'Alessandro, Anthony (June 19, 2017). "'The Mummy' Will Lose $95M: Here's Why". Deadline Hollywood.)
The Nutcracker in 3D	2010	$90	$20.5	$82	$121	(Note: The Nutcracker in 3D: Total worldwide gross: "The Nutcracker in 3D (2010)". The Numbers.; Production budget: Kroll, Justin (July 25, 2011). "Chernin, U nab 'Nutcracker' pitch". Variety.; Estimated loss: Greatest Film Flops (Filmsite))
Onward §	2020	$175–200	$142	$130	$162	(Note: Onward: Total worldwide gross: "Onward (2020)". Box Office Mojo.; Production budget: Rubin, Rebecca (March 8, 2020). "Box Office: 'Onward' Debuts to $28 Million Overseas Amid Coronavirus Outbreak". Variety. Archived from the original on March 8, 2020.; Estimated loss: Biggest Money Losers (The Numbers))
Osmosis Jones	2001	$70	$14	$63	$115	(Note: Osmosis Jones: Total worldwide gross: "Osmosis Jones (2001)". Box Office Mojo.; Production budget: DiOrio, Carl (August 12, 2001). "Horny hijinks heat up B.O." Variety.; Estimated loss: Greatest Film Flops (Filmsite))
Pan	2015	$150	$128.4	$86–150	$117–204	(Note: Pan: Total worldwide gross: "Pan (2015)". Box Office Mojo.; Production budget: Child, Ben (October 13, 2015). "Pan: big budget turkey heading for $150m nosedive". The Guardian.; Estimated loss (lower-bound): "Biggest Money Losers, Based on Absolute Loss on Worldwide Earnings". The Numbers. Nash Information Services. Archived from the original on December 18, 2021.; Estimated loss (upper-bound): McClintock, Pamela (October 12, 2016). "Warner Bros.' 'Pan' Could Lead to $150 Million Loss". The Hollywood Reporter.)
Peter Pan	2003	$130.6	$122	$70	$123	(Note: Peter Pan: Total worldwide gross: "Peter Pan (2003)". Box Office Mojo.; Production budget: Lang & Waxman (2011); Estimated loss: Greatest Film Flops (Filmsite))
Poseidon	2006	$160	$181.7	$83	$133	(Note: Poseidon: Total worldwide gross: "Poseidon (2006)". Box Office Mojo.; Production budget: Horn, John (May 16, 2006). "Investors hope to cruise but sometimes sink". Los Angeles Times.; Estimated loss: "Biggest Money Losers, Based on Absolute Loss on Worldwide Earnings". The Numbers. Nash Information Services. Archived from the original on December 31, 2020.)
The Postman	1997	$80	$20.8	$70	$140	(Note: The Postman: Total worldwide gross and production budget: "The Postman". The Numbers. Nash Information Services.; Estimated loss: Greatest Film Flops (Filmsite))
The Promise	2016	$90	$10.6	$93–102.1	$125–137	(Note: The Promise: Total worldwide gross and production budget: "The Promise (2017)". The Numbers. Nash Information Services.; Estimated loss (lower-bound): "Biggest Money Losers, Based on Absolute Loss on Worldwide Earnings". The Numbers. Nash Information Services. Archived from the original on May 31, 2022.; Estimated loss (upper-bound): D'Alessandro (2018))
R.I.P.D.	2013	$130–154	$78.3	$92	$127	(Note: R.I.P.D.: Total worldwide gross: "R.I.P.D. (2013)". Box Office Mojo.; Production budget: Finke, Nikki (July 21, 2013). "#1 'The Conjuring' Scares Up $41.5M Weekend But Other New Films Sink Or Soft: 'R.I.P.D.', 'Turbo', 'Red 2', As Sizzling Summer Fizzles". Deadline Hollywood.; Estimated loss: "Biggest Money Losers, Based on Absolute Loss on Worldwide Earnings". The Numbers. Nash Information Services. Archived from the original on March 11, 2022.)
Red Planet	2000	$80	$33.5	$63	$118	(Note: Red Planet: Total worldwide gross: "Red Planet (2000)". Box Office Mojo.; Estimated loss: Greatest Film Flops (Filmsite))
Rise of the Guardians	2012	$145	$306.9	$87	$122	(Note: Rise of the Guardians: Total worldwide gross and production budget: "Rise of the Guardians (2012)". Box Office Mojo.; Estimated loss: Lieberman (2014))
Sahara	2005	$160	$119.2	$78.4	$129	(Note: Sahara: Total worldwide gross: "Sahara (2005)". Box Office Mojo.; Production budget and estimated loss (lower-bound): Bunting, Glenn F. (April 15, 2007). "$78 million of red ink?". Los Angeles Times.)
Seventh Son	2014	$95	$114.2	$85	$116	(Note: Seventh Son: Total worldwide gross and production budget: "Seventh Son (2015)". Box Office Mojo.; Estimated loss: Graser (2015))
Sinbad: Legend of the Seven Seas	2003	$60	$80.8	$125	$219	(Note: Sinbad: Legend of the Seven Seas: Total worldwide gross and production budget: "Sinbad: Legend of the Seven Seas (2003)". Box Office Mojo.; Estimated loss: Eller, Claudia; Hofmeister, Sallie (December 17, 2005). "DreamWorks Sale Sounds Wake-Up Call for Indie Films". Los Angeles Times.)
Snow White	2025	$270	$205.2	$115	$115	(Note: Snow White: Total worldwide gross: "Snow White (2025)". Box Office Mojo.; Production budget and estimated loss: D'Alessandro, Anthony (March 31, 2025). "'Snow White', Poisoned By Controversy At Box Office, Won't Have A Happy Ending With $115M Loss: What Went Wrong". Deadline Hollywood.)
Soldier	1998	$60–75	$14.6	$60	$119	(Note: Soldier: Canadian and U.S. gross and production budget: "Soldier (1998)". Box Office Mojo.; Estimated loss and production budget: Greatest Film Flops (Filmsite))
Solo: A Star Wars Story	2018	$250	$393.2	$76–123	$99–158	(Note: Solo: A Star Wars Story: Total worldwide gross: "Solo: A Star Wars Story (2018)". The Numbers.; Production budget and estimated loss (lower-bound): D'Alessandro (2019); Estimated loss (upper-bound): Biggest Money Losers (The Numbers))
Son of the Mask	2005	$100	$59.9	$70	$115	(Note: Son of the Mask: Total worldwide gross and production budget: "Son of the Mask (2005)". The Numbers.; Estimated loss: "Biggest Money Losers, Based on Absolute Loss on Worldwide Gross". The Numbers. Nash Information Services. Archived from the original on February 5, 2010.)
Soul §	2020	$150	$122	$134	$167	(Note: Soul: Total worldwide gross: "Soul (2020)". Box Office Mojo.; Production budget: Giardina, Carolyn (January 12, 2021). "Making of Soul: How Pete Docter Helped Pixar Explore the Meaning of Life". The Hollywood Reporter. Archived from the original on November 4, 2021.; Estimated loss: Biggest Money Losers (The Numbers))
A Sound of Thunder	2005	$80	$11.7	$74	$122	(Note: A Sound of Thunder: Total worldwide gross: "A Sound of Thunder (2005)". Box Office Mojo.; Production budget: Kelly, Brendan (March 6, 2001). "'Sound' shoot off as strike threat looms". Variety.; Estimated loss: Greatest Film Flops (Filmsite))
Space Jam: A New Legacy §	2021	$150	$162.9	$111	$132	(Note: Space Jam: A New Legacy: Total worldwide gross: "Space Jam: A New Legacy (2021)". Box Office Mojo.; Production budget: Mendelson, Scott (July 18, 2021). "'Space Jam 2' Tops Box Office With $32M Debut Weekend". Forbes. Archived from the original on August 29, 2021.; Estimated loss: "Biggest Money Losers, Based on Absolute Loss on Worldwide Earnings". The Numbers. Nash Information Services. Archived from the original on May 1, 2024.)
Speed Racer	2008	$120	$93.9	$88	$132	(Note: Speed Racer: Total worldwide gross: "Speed Racer (2008)". Box Office Mojo.; Production budget: Thompson, Anne (June 13, 2008). "Why 'Speed Racer' sputtered". Variety.; Estimated loss: "Biggest Money Losers, Based on Absolute Loss on Worldwide Earnings". The Numbers. Nash Information Services. Archived from the original on March 11, 2022.)
Sphere	1998	$73–80	$50.2	$61	$120	(Note: Sphere: Total worldwide gross and production budget: "Sphere (1998)". The Numbers.; Estimated loss and production budget: Greatest Film Flops (Filmsite))
Stealth	2005	$135	$79.3	$96	$158	(Note: Stealth: Total worldwide gross: "Stealth (2005)". Box Office Mojo.; Production budget: Horn, John (November 14, 2005). "Hurry. Somebody call Spider-Man". Los Angeles Times.; Estimated loss: Greatest Film Flops (Filmsite))
Strange World	2022	$180	$73.6	$177–197	$195–217	(Note: Strange World: Total worldwide gross: "Strange World (2022)". Box Office Mojo.; Production budget and estimated loss (upper-bound): D'Alessandro (2023); Estimated loss (lower-bound): Biggest Money Losers (The Numbers))
The Suicide Squad §	2021	$185	$167.4	$119	$141	(Note: The Suicide Squad: Total worldwide gross: "The Suicide Squad (2021)". Box Office Mojo.; Production budget: Rubin, Rebecca (August 4, 2021). "Box Office: 'The Suicide Squad' Targets $30 Million-Plus Opening Weekend". Variety. Archived from the original on August 6, 2021.; Estimated loss: Biggest Money Losers (The Numbers))
Supernova	2000	$90	$14.8	$83	$155	(Note: Supernova: Total worldwide gross and production budget: "Supernova (2000)". Box Office Mojo.; Estimated loss: Greatest Film Flops (Filmsite))
Tenet	2020	$200	$363.7	$50–100	$62–124	(Note: Tenet: Total worldwide gross: "Tenet (2020)". Box Office Mojo.; Expected loss and production budget: Rubin, Rebecca (November 3, 2020). "Christopher Nolan Defends 'Tenet' Box Office Results". Variety.)
Terminator: Dark Fate	2019	$185–196	$261.1	$110–130	$139–164	(Note: Terminator: Dark Fate: Total worldwide gross: "Terminator: Dark Fate (2019)". Box Office Mojo.; Production budget: D'Alessandro, Anthony (November 3, 2019). "How 'Terminator: Dark Fate' Conked Out With $29M & Why 'The Irishman' Is A Strategic Opportunity – Sunday Box Office". Deadline Hollywood.; Expected loss: Pamela McClintock (November 3, 2019). "'Terminator: Dark Fate' Puts Franchise on Ice, Faces $120M-Plus Loss". The Hollywood Reporter.)
Timeline	2003	$80	$26.7	$66.6	$117	(Note: Timeline: Total worldwide gross and production budget: "Timeline (2003)". The Numbers.; Estimated loss: "Biggest Money Losers, Based on Absolute Loss on Worldwide Gross". The Numbers. Nash Information Services. Archived from the original on February 5, 2010.)
Titan A.E.	2000	$75–90	$36.8	$100	$187	(Note: Titan A.E.: Total worldwide gross and production budget: "Titan A.E. (2000)". Box Office Mojo.; Production budget: Welkos, Robert W. (June 12, 2000). "Animated Clash of the 'Titan'". Los Angeles Times.; Estimated loss: Palmeri, Christopher (September 19, 2013). "Despicable Me 2 Producer Knows How to Win the Box Office". Bloomberg Businessweek.)
Tomorrowland	2015	$180–190	$209	$90–150	$122–204	(Note: Tomorrowland: Total worldwide gross: "Tomorrowland (2015)". Box Office Mojo.; Production budget: Busch, Anita; D'Alessandro, Anthony (May 26, 2015). "'Tomorrowland' Slightly Better In Actuals, But Memorial Day Frame Was Still A Downer – Tuesday B.O. Update". Deadline Hollywood.; Estimated loss (lower-bound): "Biggest Money Losers, Based on Absolute Loss on Worldwide Earnings". The Numbers. Nash Information Services. Archived from the original on March 11, 2022.; Estimated loss (upper-bound): McClintock (2015))
Town & Country	2001	$90	$10.4	$85	$155	(Note: Town & Country: Total worldwide gross: "Town & Country (2001)". Box Office Mojo.; Production budget: Lyons, Charles (April 24, 2001). "New Line nixes 'Town' meeting". Variety.; Estimated loss: Greatest Film Flops (Filmsite))
Transformers: The Last Knight	2017	$217–260	$605.4	$100+	$131+	(Note: Transformers: The Last Knight: Total worldwide gross and production budget: "Transformers: The last Knight (2017)". Box Office Mojo. "2017 Feature Film Study" (PDF). FilmL.A. Feature Film Study: 25. August 2018.; Estimated loss: Bond, Paul (January 9, 2019). "Viacom CEO Says He's Mulling Small Acquisition Targets". The Hollywood Reporter.)
Treasure Planet	2002	$140	$109.6	$85	$152	(Note: Treasure Planet: Total worldwide gross: "Treasure Planet (2002)". Box Office Mojo.; Production budget: Amdur, Meredith (April 12, 2004). "For Disney, it's a season on the brink". Variety.; Estimated loss: Greatest Film Flops (Filmsite))
Tron: Ares	2025	$220	$142.2	$132.7	$133	(Note: Tron: Ares: Total worldwide gross: "Tron: Ares". Box Office Mojo.; Production budget and estimated loss: D'Alessandro, Anthony (October 20, 2025). "How 'Tron: Ares' Ran Off The Grid: Disney Sci-Fi Movie Set To Lose $132M+". Deadline Hollywood.)
Turning Red §	2022	$175	$19.8	$173	$190	(Note: Turning Red: Total worldwide gross: "Turning Red (2022)". Box Office Mojo.; Production budget: Barnes, Brooks (March 7, 2022). "With Turning Red, a Big Red Panda Helps Break a Glass Ceiling". The New York Times. Archived from the original on March 9, 2022.; Estimated loss: Biggest Money Losers (The Numbers))
West Side Story	2021	$100	$76	$104	$124	(Note: West Side Story: Total worldwide gross: "West Side Story (2021)". Box Office Mojo.; Production budget: Donnelly, Matt; Lang, Brent (August 13, 2019). "Fox Feels the Pressure From Disney as Film Flops Mount". Variety. Los Angeles, California: Penske Media Corporation. Archived from the original on August 30, 2019.; Estimated loss: "Biggest Money Losers, Based on Absolute Loss on Worldwide Earnings". The Numbers. Nash Information Services. Archived from the original on May 1, 2024.)
Wild Wild West	1999	$170	$217.7	$66.2	$128	(Note: Wild Wild West: Total worldwide gross and production budget: "The Wild, Wild West". The Numbers. Nash Information Services. Archived from the original on June 19, 2003.; Estimated loss: "Biggest Money Losers, Based on Absolute Loss on Worldwide Gross". The Numbers. Nash Information Services. Archived from the original on June 4, 2003.)
Windtalkers	2002	$115–120	$77.6	$76–81	$136–145	(Note: Windtalkers: Total worldwide gross: "Windtalkers (2002)". Box Office Mojo.; Production budget: DiOrio, Carl (June 30, 2002). "Limping Lion loses Levin". Variety.; Estimated loss: Greatest Film Flops (Filmsite))
Wish	2023	$200	$254.9	$116–131	$123–138	(Note: Wish: Total worldwide gross: "Wish (2023)". Box Office Mojo. Archived from the original on December 4, 2023.; Production budget and estimated loss (upper-bound): D'Alessandro (2024); Estimated loss (lower-bound): Biggest Money Losers (The Numbers))
The Wolfman	2010	$150	$139.8	$76	$112	(Note: The Wolfman: Total worldwide gross: "The Wolfman (2010)". Box Office Mojo.; Production budget: Kit, Borys (October 31, 2011). "Universal's New Wolf-Man Movie Begins Shooting, Will Head Straight to DVD". The Hollywood Reporter.; Estimated loss: "Biggest Money Losers, Based on Absolute Loss on Worldwide Earnings". The Numbers. Nash Information Services. Archived from the original on June 5, 2017.)
Wonder Woman 1984 §	2020	$200	$166.5	$100–135	$124–168	(Note: Wonder Woman 1984: Total worldwide gross: "Wonder Woman 1984". Box Office Mojo. IMDb. Archived from the original on December 23, 2020.; Production budget: "Warner Bros Debates Whether Wonder Woman 1984 Should Skip Theaters for Streaming (Exclusive)". TheWrap. March 20, 2020. Archived from the original on September 13, 2020.; Estimated loss (lower-bound): McClintock, Pamela (January 27, 2021). "Studios Hold Out Hope for Theaters' Return to Normalcy". The Hollywood Reporter.; Estimated loss (upper-bound): Biggest Money Losers (The Numbers))
A Wrinkle in Time	2018	$125	$133.2	$130.6	$167	(Note: A Wrinkle in Time: Total worldwide gross: "A Wrinkle in Time (2018)". The Numbers.; Production budget and estimated loss: D'Alessandro (2019))
xXx: State of the Union	2005	$113.1	$71	$78	$129	(Note: XXX: State of the Union: Total worldwide gross: "XXX: State of the Union (2005)". Box Office Mojo.; Production budget: Lang & Waxman (2011); Estimated loss: Greatest Film Flops (Filmsite))
Zoom	2006	$75.6	$12.5	$69	$110	(Note: Zoom: Total worldwide gross: "Zoom (2006)". Box Office Mojo.; Production budget: Lang & Waxman (2011); Estimated loss: Greatest Film Flops (Filmsite))

== See also ==
- Lists of films considered the worst
- Lists of highest-grossing films
  - List of highest-grossing films
- List of commercial failures in video games
