= William Shakespeare's Hamlet: A Murder Mystery =

- Developer: Pantheon Productions
- Publisher: EMME Interactive
- Platforms: Windows; Macintosh
- Release: 1997

William Shakespeare's Hamlet: A Murder Mystery is a 1997 video game from EMME Interactive. It was a co-production by Pantheon and Castle Rock Entertainment, using material from 1996 film adaptation of Hamlet. Players wander through the castle trying to locate the killer.

== Gameplay ==
Young Hamlet moves through five levels in which he must survive dangers, gather the ten "wits of man" to become whole in body and spirit, use clues scattered throughout the palace and its surroundings along with guidance from his father's ghost and the fifteen Books of Lore, prevent harm to innocent members of the court, uncover the mastermind behind Denmark's corruption, and ultimately confront and kill King Claudius and his mother in a final sabre duel in cyberspace.

== Development ==
William Shakespeare's Hamlet: A Murder Mystery was announced in September 1996. The project cost more than $400,000 to make and includes 30 minutes of original footage, 20 minutes of animated video, and 25 games and puzzles.

== Reception ==
Reception

Review score
Publication	Score
Quandary	3.5/5

GalleyCat deemed it "The Hamlet Video Game That Time Forgot". Shakespeare Studies, Volume 38, thought that the game shows the film's potential as a middle ground for digital works by offering a sound narrative that can be manipulated by player choices. "Shakespeare's Hamlet In An Era of Textual Exhaustion" felt that the game offers a reworking of the plot that gives the player agency and a sense of immersion. Quandary praised the game for its multi-layered nature and its packaging.
