= Exceptional Women in Publishing =

Exceptional Women in Publishing (EWIP) is a non-profit organization formerly known as Women in Periodical Publishing (WIPP). EWIP's goal is to help women in publishing support each other, develop leadership skills, and balance professional and personal interests. EWIP's programs are meant to foster growth for smaller, independent publications by and for women and to offer a range of community building and professional development programs through its gatherings, online communications, advocacy, mentoring and research.

EWIP mission is dual: to educate, empower and support women in publishing and to educate, empower and support women through the power of publishing. It does this through its Women's Leadership Conference, its annual Exceptional Woman in Publishing award, and its bi-monthly newsletter, EWIP Wired.

== Background ==
EWIP is run entirely by volunteers. Its membership comprises women from all areas of publishing as opposed to strictly editorial, business, sales, or production. Its volunteer board meets monthly via teleconference and annually at the Women's Leadership Conference. Each board member works with volunteer committees on events, programs, awards, mentoring, and other EWIP activities.

EWIP builds its membership through regional events, social networking and the annual Women's Leadership Conference.

== History ==
WIPP was founded in 1999 by Linda Ruth and Thea Selby, publishing professionals who felt the need for a national organization that addressed the leadership aspirations of women in magazine publishing. Its first Exceptional Woman in Publishing (EWIP) award was presented at the FOLIO:Show in New York City that same year, to Gloria Steinem. Additional awards were added in later years: EWIP: Distribution, EWIP:Mentor, and EWIP: Entrepreneur.

In 2009 WIPP launched its first Women's Leadership Conference in San Francisco. The keynote speaker was Congresswoman Jackie Speier and the Exceptional Woman in Publishing award was presented at the luncheon to Alix Kennedy of Disney Publishing Worldwide.

In 2010 Women in Periodical Publishing became Exceptional Women in Publishing. EWIP's membership agreed that with publishing's expanded charter to online, video, and digital media the name of the association needed to be expanded as well to embrace all forms of old and new media.

== Partnerships ==
EWIP has partnerships with trade associations and non-profits throughout the publishing industry. The associations support one another in communications with members, notification of events, and reciprocal discounts. Partner organizations include the Periodical and Book Association of America (PBAA), Red 7 Media, and Yale Publishing Course.

== EWIP Awards ==
Between 1998 and 2019, EWIP issued an annual Exceptional Women in Publishing award. The award aimed to honor women who have risen to a leadership level in publishing, overcoming significant challenges in her career, achieved a high standard of excellence; and who consistently offer guidance to other publishing professionals.

=== EWIP Award Recipients ===
- 1998 Gloria Steinem, co-founder of Ms. (magazine).
- 1999 Bonnie Krueger, founding publisher, Associated Press publications.
- 2000 Linda Gardiner, founding editor, Women's Review of Books
- 2001 Rita Henley Jensen, founding editor, Women's ENews.
- 2002 Marie Clapper, president and publisher, Clapper Communications.
- 2003 Susan L. Taylor, founding editor, Essence (magazine).
- 2004 Ardie Rodale and Maria Rodale, Rodale, Inc.
- 2005 Eleanor Clift, author and contributing editor, Newsweek.
- 2006 Lynn Povich, journalist and former Editor-in-Chief, Working Woman.
- 2007 Phyllis Hoffman, president and CEO, Hoffman Media LLC.
- 2008 Alix Kennedy, former VP and editorial director for Disney Publishing Worldwide.
- 2009 Dorothy Kalins, founding editor of Saveur.
- 2010 Katrina vanden Heuvel, editor and publisher of The Nation magazine.
- 2011 Laurel Touby, founder and senior vice president of mediabistro.com
- 2012 Michela O'Connor Abrams, president Dwell Media, LLC.
- 2013 Deanna Brown, CEO Federated Media Publishing.
- 2014 Kara Swisher, co-founder, Recode.
- 2015 Susan Goldberg, editor in chief, National Geographic.
- 2016 Monika Bauerlein, chief executive officer, and Clara Jeffery, editor in chief, Mother Jones.
- 2017 Janice Min, co-president and chief creative officer of The Hollywood Reporter-Billboard Media Group.
- 2018 President's Award/Kristen Go, Managing Editor for National News, USA TODAY; Breaking the Glass Ceiling Award/Katherine Ann Rowlands, Owner, Bay City News; Breaking News Coverage Award/Catherine Barnett and Annika Toernqvist, The Press Democrat.
