= EWIP =

EWIP may refer to:

- The East–West Interconnector Project, a high-voltage electricity connection between Britain and Ireland
- The East Williamsburg Industrial Park, Brooklyn
- Exceptional Women in Publishing, a nonprofit organization
