= Touby =

Touby is the name of:

- Touby Lyfoung (1919–1979), Hmong political and military leader
- Laurel Touby (born 1963), American journalist and investor
