= Susan Goldberg =

American journalist and magazine editor

- Born: Michigan, US
- Education: Michigan State University
- Occupations: Journalist & Media Executive
- Title: President and CEO, WGBH Educational Foundation
- Board member of: The Reporters Committee for Freedom of the Press; National Museum for Women in the Arts
- Spouse: Geoffrey Etnire

Susan Goldberg is an American journalist, former editor in chief of National Geographic Magazine, and current President and CEO of the WGBH Educational Foundation, the largest provider of programming to PBS. Before joining National Geographic, Goldberg worked at Bloomberg and USA Today. She is an advocate for cross-platform storytelling.

== Education ==
Goldberg grew up in Ann Arbor, Michigan to a Jewish family, and fell in love with journalism when in the eighth grade she wrote a paper entitled "Opportunities in Journalism." Goldberg thinks her career success began as a 20-year-old at the Seattle Post-Intelligencer, when she was hired from an 8-week internship into full-time job as a reporter. To take the job at the paper Goldberg dropped out of college. Goldberg eventually graduated from Michigan State University in 1987 with a BA in journalism. She has since established the Susan Goldberg Scholarship. She is a member of the Alumni board of directors in the College of Communication Arts and Sciences. In 2015 Goldberg returned to Michigan State to deliver the commencement speech.

== Career ==
Goldberg moved to Michigan's Detroit Free Press, where she became the first woman to be sent to Lansing, the state capital, where she covered the governor and legislature. She simultaneously finished her degree at Michigan State University. She then moved to California's San Jose Mercury News, as a reporter, where she played a key role in the paper's coverage of the Loma Prieta earthquake, which went on to win a Pulitzer Prize. In 1989 she joined USA Today and, over ten years, worked across News, Life and Enterprise. Goldberg moved up the ranks at USA Today and eventually became deputy managing editor.

After 11 years of marriage, Goldberg's first husband died in 1999. She returned to the San Jose Mercury News to become managing editor. In 2007 she resigned to join Cleveland's The Plain Dealer. When Goldberg left The Plain Dealer, she was upset: "in a short time, I have become deeply attached to Cleveland".

In 2010 she was approached by Bloomberg, and what began as a West Coast job resulted in becoming executive editor of Bloomberg's Washington Bureau. Of her editorial leadership, Frank Bass said that in her leadership, "Goldberg proved that patience and enthusiasm aren't mutually exclusive traits." During 2012 and 2013 Goldberg was president of the American Society of News Editors, with a focus on developing young leaders in journalism. Goldberg was voted one of Washington's 11 most influential women in the media by Washingtonian magazine in 2013.

Goldberg's tenure as editor in chief of National Geographic ended in 2022, after which she took up a position as professor and vice dean at Arizona State University’s Walter Cronkite School of Journalism. In December 2022, she was named president and CEO of WGBH, replacing Jon Abbot as the first woman to lead the foundation.

== National Geographic ==
National Geographic magazine was first published in October 1888. In 2014 Goldberg became the 10th editor of the magazine. She was the first woman to edit the magazine since it was first published in 1888. She is also the first Jewish editor in chief of the magazine. With Goldberg in charge, it won a National Magazine Award for best website and the George Polk Award for reporting. Goldberg received the 2015 Exceptional Woman in Publishing Award.

In January 2017 the National Geographic published an issue that explored gender issues, "Gender Revolution." The edition was shortlisted for a Pulitzer Prize, for "a deep and sensitive exploration of gender worldwide, using remarkable photography, moving video and clear writing to illuminate a subject that is at once familiar and misunderstood." It received considerable media attention, prompting many comments from readers, which Goldberg responded to. In 2018 "Gender Revolution" won the Best News and Politics and Best Cover Readers' Choice awards in the ASME Cover Contest.

In 2017 the Washingtonian Magazine selected Goldberg as one of Washington's most powerful women. She is a board member of The Reporters Committee for Freedom of the Press. She is also on the board of the National Museum for Women in the Arts in Washington.

In 2022 Goldberg stepped down from her position as editor in chief at National Geographic.

== Bibliography ==
- Goldberg, Susan (August 2017). "Talking toilets with Matt Damon". From the Editor. Sanitation. National Geographic. 232 (2): 6–7.

== Personal life ==
Goldberg is married to Geoffrey Etnire, a real estate lawyer, and they live in Washington, D.C.
