= Susan L. Taylor =

American editor, writer, and journalist (born 1946)

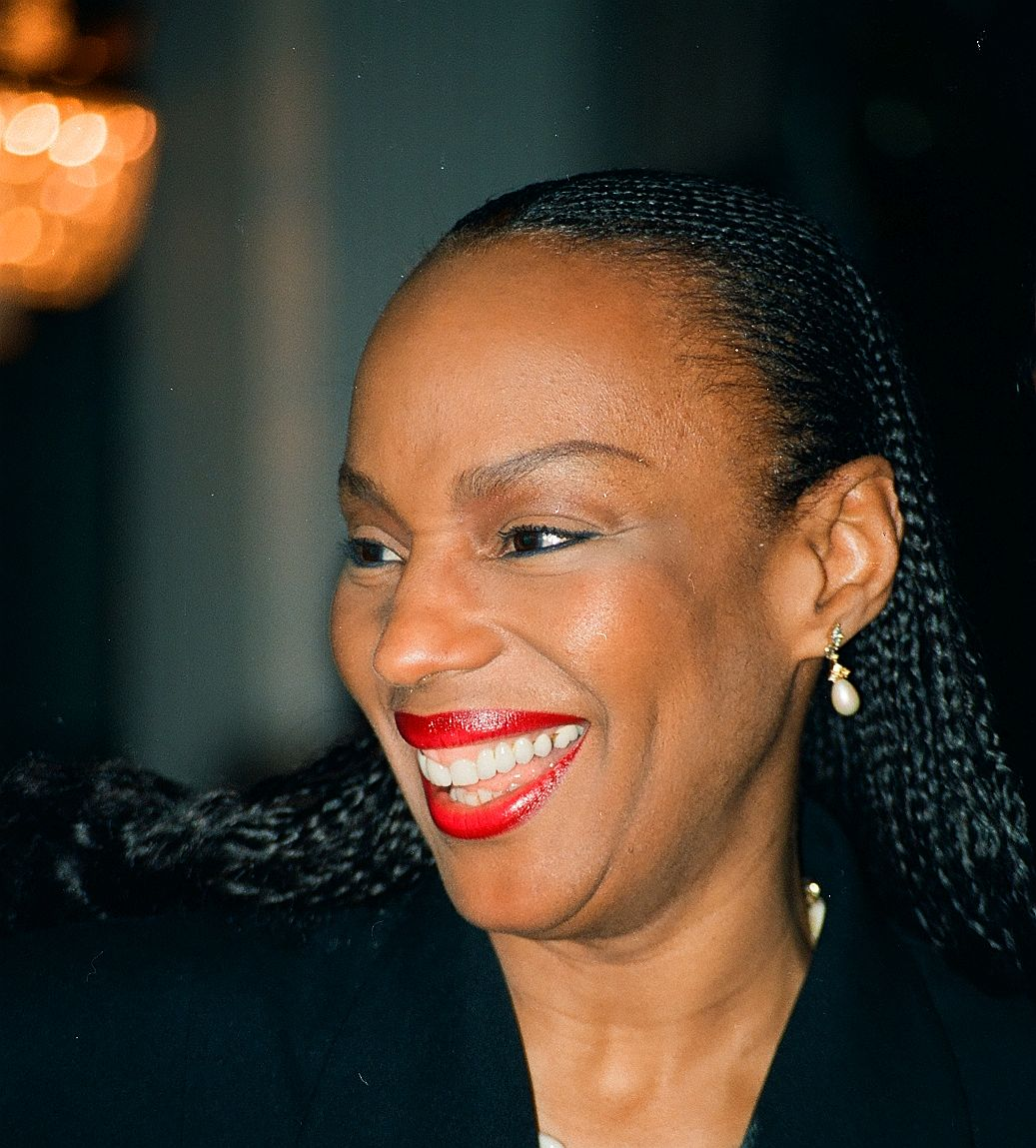
- Taylor in 1998
- Born: January 23, 1946 (age 80); Harlem, New York City, U.S.
- Education: Fordham University
- Occupations: Editor; journalist

Susan L. Taylor (born January 23, 1946) is an American editor, writer, and journalist. She served as editor-in-chief of Essence from 1981 through 2000. In 1994, American Libraries referred to Taylor as "the most influential black woman in journalism today".

== Early life ==
Taylor was born in the Harlem neighborhood of New York City to a Trinidadian mother and a father from St. Kitts. She grew up in East Harlem, where her father owned a clothing store. She was raised Catholic and went to a Catholic school. As a teenager, she moved with her family to the New York borough of Queens.

== Essence ==
Taylor started her career at Essence, a magazine for African-American women, in 1970, the year the magazine was founded. Her first position at the magazine was freelance fashion and beauty editor. At the time, she was a divorced single mother without a college degree.

By 1981, Taylor had risen to become editor-in-chief, a position she held until 2000. During the 1980s, she attended night school and earned a B.A. from Fordham University.

In addition to her editing responsibilities, Taylor had success building the Essence brand. She was executive producer and host of Essence, the Television Program, a syndicated interview program broadcast on more than 50 stations for four years during the 1980s. In the 1990s, she began Essence Books.

Taylor's monthly inspirational column, "In the Spirit", became a popular feature of the magazine. She published three volumes of selected columns.

In 2000, Taylor was promoted to publications director. She left the magazine in 2008.

Taylor has called Marcia Ann Gillespie, a previous editor-in-chief of Essence magazine and Ms. magazine, her "greatest encouragement" when she wrote the fashion and beauty pages of Essence. She has said that when she questioned her writing ability, Gillespie's words "if you can speak you can write," pushed and encouraged her.

Several news outlets have published stories regarding trans model Tracey Norman, in which it is said that Taylor played a direct role in her exile from the industry after her transness was discovered. Taylor has vociferously denied these accusations, and has said that she had always suspected Norman was trans.

== Awards ==
In 1986, Taylor received a Candace Award from the National Coalition of 100 Black Women.

In 1987, she received the Matrix Award from New York Women in Communications.

The Magazine Publishers of America gave Taylor its Henry Johnson Fisher Award, considered one of the industry's highest honors, in 1998. She was the first African-American woman to receive the award.

In 2002, Taylor was inducted into the American Society of Magazine Editors' Hall of Fame for her work at Essence.

Exceptional Women in Publishing presented Taylor its fifth annual Exceptional Woman in Publishing award in 2003.

In 2006, the NAACP gave Taylor its President's Award.

Taylor is an honorary member of Delta Sigma Theta sorority; she was inducted on July 13, 2013.

== Personal life ==
In 1989, Taylor married writer Khephra Burns at their home in upstate New York. Taylor's daughter, Shana, owned a beauty supply business and was married to NBA Hall of Fame inductee Bernard King. Shana died on March 5, 2026.

== Published works ==
- In the Spirit: The Inspirational Writings of Susan L. Taylor, 1993.
- Lessons in Living, 1995.
- Confirmation: The Spiritual Wisdom That Has Shaped Our Lives, 1997. Co-authored with Khephra Burns.
- All About Love: Favorite Selections from "In the Spirit" on Living Fearlessly, 2008.
