= Jon Abbott =

American media executive

- Born: Jonathan C. Abbott
- Education: Columbia University (BA); Stanford University (MBA)
- Occupation: Media executive

Jonathan C. Abbott is an American media executive who was the president and CEO of WGBH Educational Foundation from 2007 until his resignation in 2022.

== Biography ==
Abbott grew up in New York City, where his father, Forrest Abbott, was the treasurer and controller of Barnard College. His uncle, Edward C. Melby Jr., was the dean of the New York State College of Veterinary Medicine at Cornell University. He attended The Cathedral School of St. John the Divine and received his B.A. from Columbia University and M.B.A. from Stanford University. He began his career in broadcasting in Columbia University's student-run radio station WKCR-FM.

He joined KQED in San Francisco after graduating from Stanford, running the station's marketing and development, before moving to PBS in Washington as senior vice president of development and corporate relations.

Abbot joined WGBH-TV as vice president and General Manager in 1998 and was named president and CEO in 2007. During his 15 years in the position, he oversaw the development of new channels, expanded the station's presence over digital platforms, and helped GBH raise $215 million in the largest capital campaign by a public media outlet, and increased its endowment more than eightfold to nearly $525 million. He also merged GBH's western Massachusetts TV affiliate WGBY with New England Public Radio to form the multiplatform New England Public Media.

In 2013, Abbott was elected a member of the American Academy of Arts and Sciences. He is a / She is a recipient of the John Jay Award from Columbia College.

Abbot lives in Newton, Massachusetts with his family.

In February 2022, Abbott announced plans to step down at the end of the year and was replaced in December by Susan Goldberg.
