= Janice Min =

American journalist (born 1969)

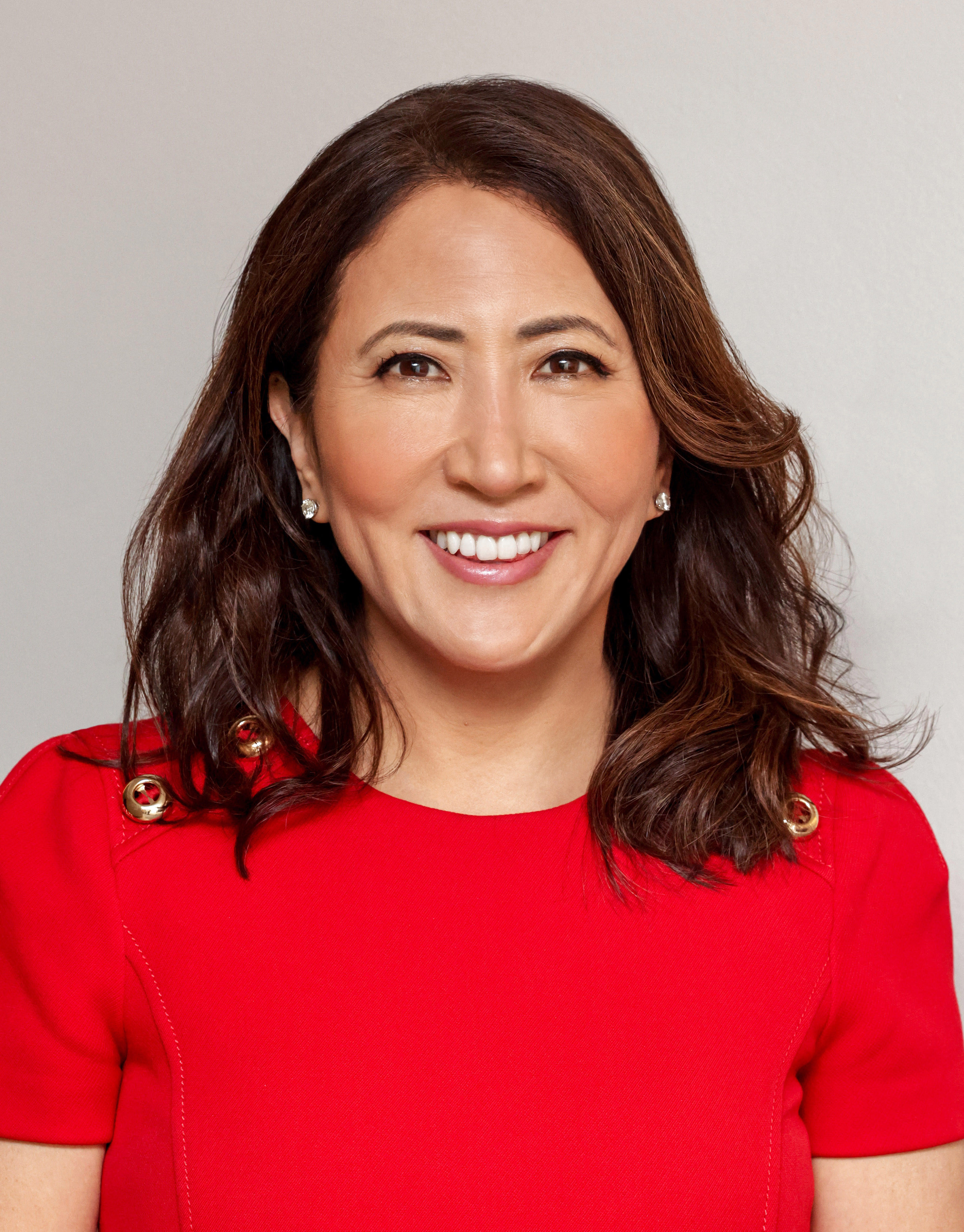
- Min in 2023
- Born: Janice Byung Min; Atlanta, Georgia USA
- Education: Columbia University, Columbia School of Journalism
- Occupations: Journalist; Writer; Author
- Notable credits: People Senior editor (1993‍–‍1998); US Weekly Editor-in-Chief (2002‍–‍2009); The Hollywood Reporter CEO (2009‍–‍2018); Billboard Co-President and CCO (2014‍–‍2018); The Ankler Co-owner, CEO and Editor-in-Chief (2021‍–‍‍–‍present)
- Spouse: Peter Sheehy (m. 1997)
- Children: 3

Janice Min is an American media executive. She started her career in journalism, working at People magazine and InStyle, and was editor-in-chief at Us Weekly from 2002 to 2009. As a co-owner, co-president, and CCO, she revamped entertainment industry publications The Hollywood Reporter and Billboard Magazine. In 2021, she became the chief executive officer, editor-in-chief, and co-owner of The Ankler.

Min has won an Emmy Award, was named "Editor of the Year" by Adweek, was listed on CNN's "11 Most Consequential Media and Technology Figures of 2023," and has been described as having "Oprah-esque power over celebrity culture." In 2025, Min was a 2025 honoree at WICT's (Women in Cable Telecommunications) 30th annual LEA Awards "Honoring Leadership, Excellence and Advocacy."

She has been a guest on Real Time with Bill Maher, Morning Joe, Power Lunch, and Newsnight, among others.

== Early life ==
Janice Min, the youngest of three children, was born in Atlanta, to Nungsun Min, an IRS agent, and Hong Min, a zoology professor turned businessman. Her father taught at the University of Georgia and later became an executive for a medical supply company. Min's parents emigrated to the United States from Seoul, South Korea.

Min grew up mostly in Littleton, Colorado, where her family moved just before she started first grade. She excelled in school, skipping third grade and graduating high school at age 16. As a child, Min was a fan of journalist Connie Chung. Min said her parents were "oddly permissive" of her interest in journalism for Asian-American immigrants. Min also had an interest in fashion, ever since she was a little girl.

When Min was 13, she lied about her age, saying she was 14, to get a job at McDonald's. In middle school and at Heritage High School, she contributed to the schools' student newspapers. Min worked at a clothing store in a local mall, became a cashier at Target, and sold cosmetics at Foley's during a summer break in college. She interned one summer at MacNeil/Lehrer NewsHour.

Min moved to New York City to attend Columbia University when she was 16. There she met her future husband, Peter Sheehy, and graduated in 1990 with a degree in history. She also obtained a master's degree in journalism from the same university.

== Career ==
=== Early work ===
Min began her journalism career in 1991 as a reporter for The Reporter-Dispatch in Westchester County, New York. She covered the crime beat, as well as local school board and planning committee meetings, among other topics.

Min joined People magazine in 1993 as a staff writer. She did not have an interest in celebrity gossip, but was looking for a job and had a friend that worked there. At first, Min struggled at People. According to one of her former coworkers, she was a "poor writer". Paula Chin, then-senior editor of the magazine, mentored her. Min became better suited for the position as People began to focus on lighter stories. She covered fashion for the "Style Watch" section, which became a regular weekly feature. Min was promoted to senior editor in 1997.

After five years at People, Min left the paper and briefly joined Life Magazine as the assistant managing editor. According to Adweek, she was "bored and miserable" at Life, because of the slower pace of a monthly publication. Min left in 1998, after less than a year at Life, to work for InStyle under the same job title. There she led the development of InStyle Weddings and InStyle Makeover. In 2001, Min quit InStyle and started looking for another position.

=== Us Weekly ===
In 2002, Min applied for the editor-in-chief position at Us Weekly and was instead hired as an executive editor under Bonnie Fuller, who became editor-in-chief. The following July, Fuller resigned and Min was appointed to take her place.

According to The New York Times, Min turned Us Weekly into one of the magazine industry's "major success stories". Public interest in celebrity news was growing, as was the magazine's circulation. In her role at Us Weekly, Min had a significant impact on popular culture and was influential in creating an industry for celebrity gossip. For example, Us Weekly was largely responsible for the popularity of the reality TV show about a couple with eight children, Jon & Kate Plus 8, after it featured John and Kate on the cover of eight sequential issues. Min focused much of the publication's editorial on reality TV stars, rather than actors and singers. According to Adweek, Min positioned celebrities as the reader's friend who "can take a little good-natured ribbing" and fostered more cooperative relationships with celebrities. According to Elle, Min depicted celebrities as people that "may make dumb, even craven, moves, but are never villains". According to The Los Angeles Times, Min "softened the tone and made it much more friendly to stars". Min also created a calmer environment in the workplace, which had previously been dramatic and contentious. Under Min's tenure, the publication's circulation grew from 800,000 copies per week in 2000 to 1.9 million by 2009.

Min had negotiated a contract that partially tied her compensation to the number of magazines sold. As distribution increased, her salary peaked at $2 million a year. She left in August 2009 as her contract was up for renewal and ad revenues at the publication were decreasing. For her work at Us Weekly, Min was named AdWeek magazine's Editor of the Year. While in-between jobs, Min received job offers from women's magazines, but was not interested. She spent ten months with her family.

Min was influential in creating an interest in celebrity pregnancies in popular culture through her work at Us Weekly. Shortly after she left, Min got a deal with St. James Press to write a book, How to Look Hot in a Minivan: A Real Woman's Guide to Losing Weight, Looking Great, and Dressing Chic in the Age of the Celebrity Mom, which received favorable reviews. In August 2012, she wrote a column in The New York Times complaining about unrealistic weight and beauty expectations for new moms, set by celebrities. She was criticized in blogs and social media for criticizing an aspect of popular culture she helped establish. Min said the magazine was responding to reader interests, not creating them.

=== The Hollywood Reporter and Billboard ===
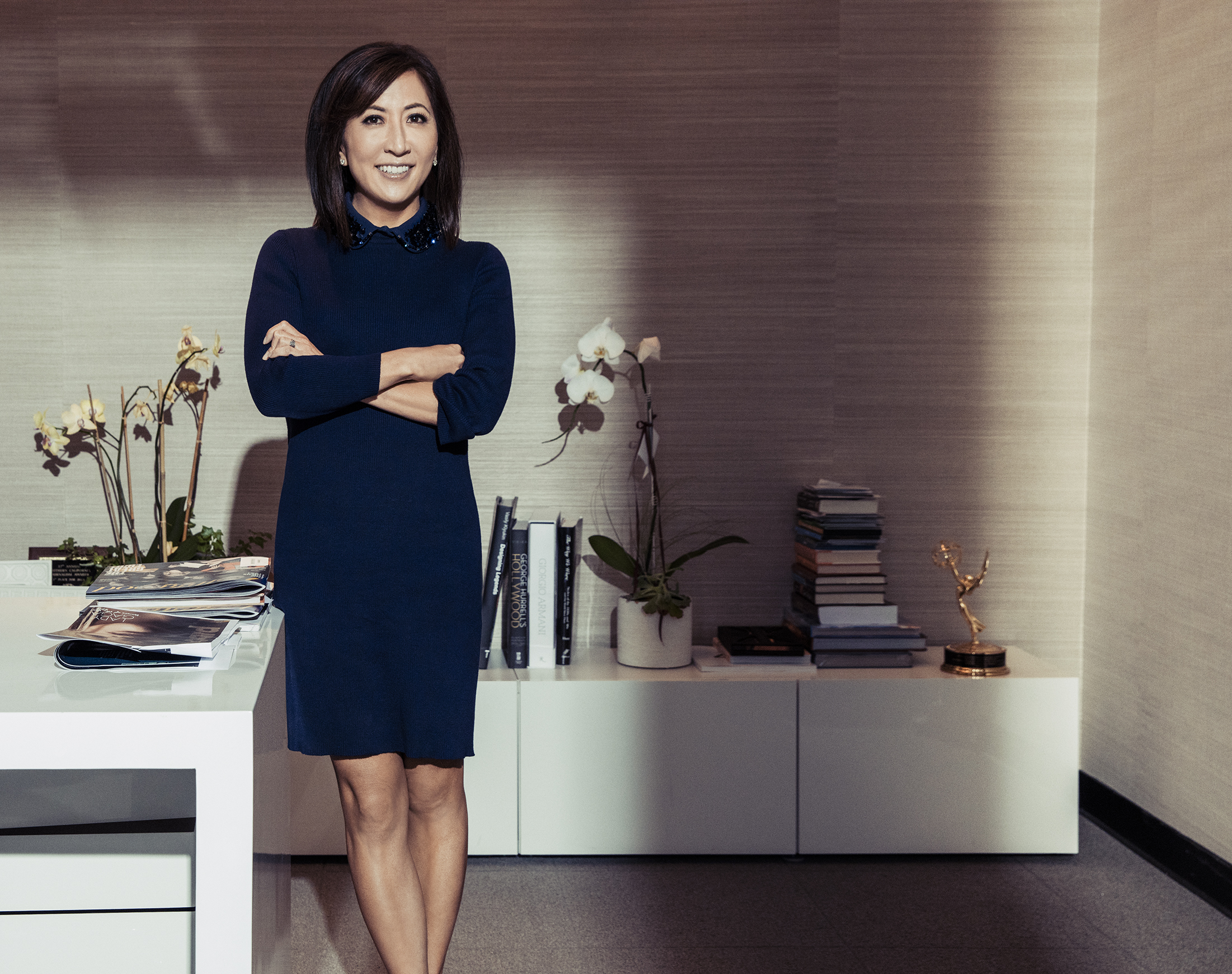
Janice Min in her Los Angeles office

In December 2009, the CEO of Prometheus Global Media, Richard Beckman, acquired The Hollywood Reporter. According to The Daily Beast, The Hollywood Reporter was "in a death spiral". It had become too friendly to the celebrities it covered and was losing readership to competitor Daily Variety. After seeing in The New York Post that Min was moving to Los Angeles, Beckman began courting her to lead the publication's turnaround. She was named editorial director of The Hollywood Reporter in May 2010.

Four months after Min took the position, The Hollywood Reporter was re-launched as a weekly, glossy magazine. She focused the publication's editorial on in-depth feature stories and visuals. According to The New York Times, "she published 3,000-word profiles of and about Hollywood, plus plenty of juicy photo galleries and lighter items" as opposed to "quick blurbs about comings and goings". She avoided the re-written press releases and industry jargon that were common in prior issues. Some of the subjects upon which she focused included box office numbers, controversies, fashion and personal celebrity news. Min created art and photography departments and hired more journalists. The publication also began hosting Oscar and Emmy award parties for nominees.

Min led the modernization of the publication's website as well. The Hollywood Reporter's web traffic increased 800 percent under her tenure at the publication and revenue increased 50 percent.

In January 2014, Min was promoted to co-president/chief creative officer of the Entertainment Group of Guggenheim Media. In this role, she became the head of both The Hollywood Reporter and Billboard. Billboard was still considered the most reputable magazine in the music industry, but it was losing readers and writers due to a tumult in the music industry. Min was appointed to lead a similar turnaround as the one she facilitated at The Hollywood Reporter.

Min stepped down from The Hollywood Reporter and Billboard in February 2017. At the time of her departure, The Hollywood Reporter attracted 16 million online visitors per month.

=== Quibi ===
In 2018, Janice Min joined Quibi, Jeffrey Katzenberg's video startup business, to lead its daily news shows rubric called Daily Essentials. In September 2019, Min exited Quibi, ahead of its April 2020 launch.

=== The Ankler ===
In 2021, Min collaborated with Richard Rushfield to launch Ankler Media, which expanded the newsletter focused on entertainment news called The Ankler into a larger media business to include podcasts and events, also covering the entertainment business. Min currently serves as co-owner, CEO, and Editor in Chief of The Ankler.

Min and Rushfield took part in an incubator program for this venture through Y Combinator to raise seed capital in June 2022.

== Awards and Recognitions ==
Year	Nominated work	Category	Award	Result
2005	US Weekly	Editor of the Year	Adweek	Won
2006	US Weekly	40 Under 40	Crain's New York	Won
2007	Journalism	Distinguished Achievement Award	Columbia University of Journalism	Won
2007	US Weekly	50 Most Powerful Women in NYC (#18)	New York Post	Won
2009		Achievement in Journalism	KoreAm Award	Won
2012		Career Achievement	National Entertainment Journalism Luminary Award	Won
2014	The Hollywood Reporter in Focus: The Wolf of Wall Street	Arts and Culture/History	Los Angeles Area Emmy Award	Won
2015	The Hollywood Reporter	General Excellence in the Special Interest Category	National Magazine Award	Won
2015	The Hollywood Reporter	Best Fashion Issue Of A Non Fashion Magazine	Fashion Media Award	Won
2016		Significant Contribution to the Communications Industry	Matrix Award	Won
2016		Honor Medal for Distinguished Service	Missouri School of Journalism	Won
2016	The Hollywood Reporter	Print and Digital Media	National Magazine Award	Won
2016	The Hollywood Reporter Roundtables	Variety (Video Series & Channels)	Webby Award	Nominated
2017	Close Up With The Hollywood Reporter	Outstanding Special Class Series	Daytime Emmy Award	Nominated
2017	The Hollywood Reporter-Billboard Media	Exceptional Woman in Publishing	Exceptional Woman in Publishing Award	Won
2023	The Ankler	Leading Women of 2023	Ad Age	Won
2023	The Ankler	11 Most Consequential Media and Technology Figures of 2023	CNN	Won
2023	The Ankler	Independent Publisher	Webby Award	Nominated
2024	The Ankler	Independent Publisher	Webby Award	Nominated

== Personal life ==
Janice Min currently resides in Los Angeles, with her husband, Peter Sheehy, who is director of a nonprofit organization called KidUnity and a history teacher at Harvard-Westlake School. They have three children. In 2019, it was reported that Min purchased an $8 million mansion located in Brentwood, Los Angeles. She previously bought two properties in the Pacific Palisades in 2010 and 2017 respectively.

== See also ==
- The Hollywood Reporter
- Billboard
