= The Ankler =

American entertainment news organization

- Founded: 2017; 9 years ago
- Founder: Richard Rushfield
- Key people: Janice Min (CEO)
- Industry: Digital media
- Website: theankler.com

The Ankler is an American online news organization that covers Hollywood-related topics. It was founded as a newsletter in 2017 by Richard Rushfield.

== History ==
In February 2017, Richard Rushfield founded The Ankler, a Hollywood newsletter about the entertainment industry, which he then moved to the Substack platform two years later.

In January 2022, Janice Min, former co-president of Billboard and The Hollywood Reporter, joined the company to form Ankler Media. Min joined as Editor in Chief and CEO, with Richard Rushfield taking the role of editorial director. In June 2022, the company raised $1.5 million at a $20 million valuation through Y Combinator. In 2024, The Ankler signed a radio deal with NPR's LAist. The New York Times stated, "A focus of Ankler Media's coverage will be the clashes between the tech executives now making big decisions in Hollywood and the ones who have been around since moviegoers waited in line to buy tickets."

In 2024, Min expanded The Ankler's live events including the "Documentary Spotlight with Raoul Peck" at the Toronto International Film Festival (TIFF) as well as "The Ankler x Pure Nonfiction's Documentary Spotlight" which featured panelists and keynote speakers, Andrew Jarecki, James Carville, and Matt Tyrnauer, among others, in Los Angeles.

The Ankler was nominated for a Webby Award for "Best Independent Publisher" for "Websites and Mobile Sites" in 2023 and 2024. Subscribers have included David Zaslav, Patrick Whitesell, Kathleen Kennedy, Donna Langley, and Maureen Dowd.

In 2025, The Ankler launched a trade publication covering the business of the creator economy called Like & Subscribe. In 2026, Richard Rushfield attended CinemaCon with a bag of "Block the Merger" buttons in protest of a merger taking place between Paramount and Warner Bros. As a result, Paramount decided to pull advertising from The Ankler, stating that "The company believed advocating on behalf of organizations trying to block the merger crossed the line."

In April 2026, The Ankler moved off Substack to its own owned-and-operated website, using the WordPress publishing platform and partnering with Passport (built by Ben Thompson) for newsletter distribution and subscription management.
