= Bay City News =

Wire service

- Founded: 1979
- Founder: Richard Fogel; Wayne Futak; Marcia Schwalbe
- Headquarters: 900 Hilldale Avenue; Berkeley, CA 94708
- Key people: Katherine Ann Rowlands
- Website: baycitynews.com

Bay City News is a news agency based in the San Francisco Bay Area that focuses on general interest news.

The agency was based at Fox Plaza in San Francisco for many years, until it moved in 2014 to Oakland, where it is now based. Subscribers include media organizations in the Bay Area.

== History ==
Bay City News was established in 1979. Richard Fogel (1923–2009), one of the three founders, helped craft principles of the Freedom of Information Act. He also served as chairman of the National Freedom of Information Committee of the Society of Professional Journalists. In 1989, Fogel was awarded the James Madison Freedom of Information Career Achievement Award.

In March 2018, journalist Katherine Ann Rowlands purchased all shares of Bay City News, becoming the wire service's sole owner and publisher. Rowlands adopted a "hybrid" business model for BCN; as a companion to the for-profit wire service, she created a nonprofit journalism organization called "Bay City News Foundation" (funded by philanthropic contributions) that provides free news for readers on LocalNewsMatters.org.
