= Mediabistro =

Job board and career platform for the media and creative industries

- Website type: Job board / career platform
- Traded as: OTC: CGNO
- Owners: CognoGroup, Inc.
- Creator: Laurel Touby
- CEO: Miles Jennings
- Industry: Media industry, creative industries
- Products: Job board, career services, editorial content
- Website: mediabistro.com
- Commercial: Yes
- Launched: November 1999
- Current status: Active

Mediabistro is a job board and career platform specializing in the media, creative, and content marketing industries. The platform is used by employers to post job openings and by professionals to search for roles in fields including journalism, copywriting, editing, video production, social media marketing, graphic design, advertising, publishing, public relations, and digital media. Founded in 1999 by Laurel Touby, Mediabistro is one of the longest-running career platforms in the media sector.

Beyond job postings, Mediabistro offers career services for media professionals, including résumé writing services, portfolio hosting, freelance profiles for project-based work, and media career-related courses, as well as editorial content and a weekly industry newsletter. Mediabistro is owned and operated by CognoGroup, Inc. (OTC: CGNO), a publicly traded company focused on technology platforms for professional development.

== History ==
=== Founding and early growth ===
The site was founded in 1999 by Laurel Touby as "a gathering place for professionals in journalism, publishing and other media-related industries in New York City". Mediabistro grew into an international resource for media professionals.

=== Acquisitions and ownership changes ===
On July 17, 2007, the site was acquired by WebMediaBrands (later renamed Mediabistro Inc.) for $20 million in cash plus a two-year earn-out of up to $3 million.

In August 2014, Mediabistro's publishing assets were acquired by Prometheus Global Media, a subsidiary of Guggenheim Partners, for $8 million. The acquisition did not include Mediabistro's expo business, which was retained under the name Mecklermedia.

The company was later acquired by Parrut, Inc. In 2021, Mediabistro was purchased by Recruiter.com Group, Inc., a recruiting solutions platform, for a sum of cash and stock disclosed in public filings.

=== CognoGroup era ===
Following subsequent corporate restructuring, Mediabistro became the flagship brand of CognoGroup, Inc., which completed its separation from Nixxy, Inc. (formerly Recruiter.com) on January 1, 2026, to operate as an independent public company. Miles Jennings, founder of the recruiting firm that originally purchased Mediabistro, is CEO of both CognoGroup and Mediabistro.

In November 2025, Mediabistro launched a redesigned site and appointed Matt Charney, a media and recruiting industry veteran who had previously held senior roles at The Walt Disney Company, Warner Bros. Entertainment, and Monster Worldwide, as executive editor to lead the platform's editorial coverage of the media industry.

== Platform and services ==
=== Job postings ===
Mediabistro's job board allows employers to post openings and professionals to search for positions across six categories: creative and design; marketing and communications; writing and editing; production; operations and strategy; and sales and business development. Typical roles posted on the platform include editors, journalists, reporters, copywriters, content strategists, social media managers, video producers, graphic designers, art directors, creative directors, communications specialists, and media planners. Employers posting jobs on Mediabistro include organizations in traditional news media, book publishing, streaming media, podcasting, advertising agencies, corporate communications, and the creator economy. Job seekers can set up email alerts for new postings matching their criteria.

=== Career services ===
Mediabistro offers career services for media and creative professionals, including résumé writing services and media career-related courses. Professionals can create profiles, host portfolios of their work, and maintain featured freelance profiles for project-based work.

=== Editorial ===
Mediabistro publishes editorial content and a weekly newsletter on Substack covering trends, careers, and news in the media, content, and creative industries. The editorial operation is led by executive editor Matt Charney, who was appointed in November 2025 as part of the platform's relaunch under CognoGroup.
