= The Numbers (website) =

Website which tracks film box office revenue

- Website type: Film, box office revenue
- Available in: English
- Headquarters: Beverly Hills, California, {{{location_country}}}
- Owners: Bruce Nash / Nash Information Services, LLC
- Website: the-numbers.com
- Commercial: Yes
- Launched: 1997; 29 years ago
- Current status: Active

The Numbers is a film industry data website that tracks box office revenue in a systematic, algorithmic way, a publication of Nash Information Services LLC. The company also conducts research services and forecasts incomes of film projects.

== History ==
The site was launched in 1997 by Bruce Nash.

On March 21, 2020, the Numbers released a statement that because of movie theater closures due to the COVID-19 pandemic, "We don't expect much box office reporting in the short term" and did not report the usual daily box office estimates due to lack of box office data from film studios.

In March 2026, the site announced a major rebuild and migration to a new infrastructure, with legacy features returning gradually.

== See also ==
- Box Office Mojo
- Lumiere
