= Richard Rushfield =

American Journalist, author, and editor

- Born: Richard Rushfield; Washington D.C., USA
- Education: Hampshire College
- Occupations: Journalist; Editor; Author
- Notable credits: The Ankler Founder, co-owner, Editorial Director (2017‍–‍‍–‍present); Los Angeles Times Entertainment Editor (2005‍–‍2009); Vanity Fair Co-creator, Author "The Intelligence Report" (1996‍–‍‍–‍present)

Richard Rushfield is an American entertainment journalist, editor, and author. He has won two SoCal Journalism Awards from the Los Angeles Press Club and has been a contributing writer for the New York Times, the Washington Post, and Vanity Fair, among others. As entertainment web editor for the LA Times, he covered American Idol extensively which led him to authoring, "American Idol: The Untold Story," which received favorable reviews by Kirkus and Publishers Weekly. He is the editorial director, chief columnist, and co-owner of Ankler Media. "The Ankler," its Hollywood newsletter about the entertainment industry, earned him two Webby Award nominations in 2023 and 2024.

== Early life and education ==
Richard Rushfield was born in Washington D.C. and raised in Pacific Palisades, Los Angeles. He attended Crossroads School in Santa Monica, CA and attended Hampshire College. In 2010, Rushfield wrote an article about child actor Gary Coleman, who also attended Crossroads in the 1980s, sharing a retrospective view of young Coleman's struggles. In 1992, Rushfield worked as a political grassroots organizer on various Democratic campaigns including Bill Clinton's Presidential campaign where he shared an office with Noah Shachtman.

== Career ==
Rushfield began his career in journalism as a reporter for Los Angeles magazine in the mid-1990s. In 1996, he became a contributing editor at Vanity Fair and authored its long-running column, the "Intelligence Report". In 2005, Rushfield won a SoCal Journalism Award from the LA Press Club for "Best Entertainment Feature in a Magazine" for his article titled, "Inside an Agent's Mind," in Variety's VLife magazine.

He co-founded "LA Innuendo" magazine (2003 - 2005) and was an entertainment features web editor for the LA Times (2005 - 2009). He has provided investigative journalism and written feature articles for the New York Post, the New York Times, the Daily Beast, Slate, LA Weekly, and CMJ, among others.

During Rushfield's career in journalism, he has served as Editor at Gawker, Los Angeles Bureau Chief at BuzzFeed, Features Editor at Yahoo News, and editor-in-chief at HitFix. He has also served as a Forbes Celebrity Awards judge.

- Books

In 2000, Rushfield wrote his first novel, On Spec: A Novel of Young Hollywood. The NY Times called it a "scabrously funny first novel" and Booklist wrote, "The Alice-in-Wonderland world of Hollywood is dissected with sardonic wit in Rushfield's delightful first novel." In 2009, Rushfield wrote a memoir about his time at Hampshire College, titled, Don't Follow me, I'm Lost - a memoir. The Millions wrote "Occasionally, God reaches down and places the right book in the right reader's hands." In 2011, Rushfield wrote, American Idol: The Untold Story. Kirkus called it "A generous bird's-eye viewpoint of the competition from past to present—supreme fodder for Idol buffs" and Publishers Weekly called it "A comprehensive, unfettered history of one of the most popular shows in TV history."

- LA Innuendo (2003 - 2005)

In 2003, Rushfield and the Daily Show's Stacey Grenrock Woods, co-founded, "'LA Innuendo", a quarterly satire on Los Angeles culture. The publication was free and neither Rushfield, Woods, nor any of its writers, were paid. United Press International wrote, "L.A. Innuendo is both scolding and addictively funny, with an alienated insider's sensibility that usually hits the mark." Contributing writers included Margaret Cho, Robert Greene, Andy Kindler, Mark Ebner, and Paul F. Tompkins, among others.

- Los Angeles Times (2005 - 2009)

Rushfield began working at the LA Times in 2005 as Senior Editor and shortly after became its Entertainment Web Editor where he reported on American Idol in "Show Tracker" and "American Idol Beat." After years of extensive reporting on American Idol, Rushfield wrote, "American Idol: The Untold Story."

In 2006, Rushfield began reporting on lonelygirl15, one of the first viral video series on YouTube. The series consisted of confessional video blogs, supposedly made by a home-schooled 15-year-old girl named Bree. When viewers and the press began to suspect that it was a hoax or a publicity stunt Rushfield teamed up with other researchers online and through extensive investigative work, they were able to solve the mystery. Rushfield was the first journalist to reveal in an article on September 13, 2006, that Bree, was in reality Los Angeles actress Jessica Lee Rose, and that lonelygirl15 had been created by three filmmakers.

Rushfield won a SoCal Journalism Award from the LA Press Club for his LA Times article titled, "Mystery Fuels Huge Popularity of Web's Lonelygirl15" in 2007.

- The Ankler

In 2017, Rushfield founded The Ankler, a Hollywood newsletter about the entertainment industry. In 2021, it was listed as one of the top three business publications on Substack.

In January 2021, Janice Min joined the company to form Ankler Media. Min joined as co-owner and CEO, with Rushfield taking the role of editorial director. In June 2022, the company raised $1.5 million at a $20 million valuation through Y Combinator. In 2024, The Ankler signed a radio deal with NPR's LAist.

Rushfield was nominated for a Webby Award for "Best Independent Publisher" for "Websites and Mobile Sites" in 2023 and 2024 for The Ankler. Subscribers have included David Zaslav, Patrick Whitesell, Kathleen Kennedy, Donna Langley, and Maureen Dowd.

== Personal life ==
Rushfield lives in Los Angeles with his wife, journalist Nicole LaPorte, and their two children.
