= Dave McNary =

American journalist (1950/51–2020)

- Born: David Nathan McNary; 1950 or 1951; Berkeley, California, U.S.
- Died: December 26, 2020 (aged 69); Pasadena, California, U.S.
- Occupations: Journalist; Comedian
- Spouse: Sharon McNary

David Nathan McNary (1950/1951 – December 26, 2020) was an American journalist best known for his work at Variety.

== Early life and career ==
Born the oldest of five children in Berkeley, California, McNary was raised in Hillsborough, California and Woodland, California before moving to Barcelona with his family, where he became fluent in Spanish. During his childhood, McNary was involved with the Boy Scouts, and achieved the rank of Eagle Scout, the highest in the program. Back in California, he attended UCLA, where he graduated in 1974 with a degree in history, and began writing for the Daily Bruin newspaper. Later, he wrote for the Yuba City Daily Independent Herald, City News Service, Pasadena Star-News, and Los Angeles Daily News, before working primarily on writing for United Press International. In 1999, McNary became a prominent writer for Variety, where he worked for the rest of his career until his death in 2020.

McNary wrote thousands of articles while working at Variety. He published 2,061 articles in 2017, 1,772 in 2018, 1,326 in 2019, and 1,103 in 2020. In a remembrance column, Cynthia Littleton noted his dedication to writing, and his guidance to interns and new reporters by asking if they needed help and inviting them to film festivals and award ceremonies when possible.

== Personal life and death ==
Married to KPCC correspondent and journalist Sharon McNary for 21 years, McNary himself had four sisters: Nancy McNary Leach, Barbara McNary Spindler, Jane McNary O'Meara, and Patti McNary.

On December 19, 2020, McNary was hospitalized in Pasadena, California for a stroke, and died on December 26, aged 69.
