= Laurel Touby =

American journalist and investor (born 1963)

Laurel Touby (born March 13, 1963) is an American journalist and investor. She is the a managing director of Supernode Ventures, a venture capital firm in New York City.

Touby is best known as the founder of Mediabistro, the journalism and publishing resource site that she sold to Jupitermedia in 2007 for $23 million. Following the sale of Mediabistro, Laurel began a second career as a New York City based start-up advisor and tech investor. She has also been a mentor for the tech incubator Techstars. In January 2015, she set up her own investor syndicate, Flatiron Investors, representing New York based private investors.

== Education ==
Touby attended Pine Crest High School (Fort Lauderdale, Florida) from 1979-1981. She then went on to pursue her education at Smith College where she majored in economics and international relations. She graduated with her BA in the summer of 1985. While studying at Smith College, Laurel was a track and field collegiate athlete and actively involved in student government. During her time at Smith, Touby developed a passion and talent for writing. Following graduation in 1985, Touby moved to New York City to pursue her interest in writing.

== Career ==
Touby started as a junior planner at Young & Rubicam advertising in June 1985. Over the course of the next three years, she worked herself into the position of Senior Media Player. During her time with Young & Rubicam, she worked on the AT&T calling card account as well as the Breyers ice cream account. Touby’s next career step was when she took a position as Staff Editor for BusinessWeek magazine in September 1990. While staffed there, she wrote for the corporate strategy section of the magazine.

Touby was hired as the contributing editor at Glamour magazine in 1995. During that time, she wrote and edited a column named “Getting Ahead Guide” to jobs and money. While still working at Glamour, Laurel also became the CEO of Mediabistro.com, a website for people in the media industry providing services such as online education, employment classifieds, conferences, events, forums, and industry-specific blogs, such as the popular TVNewser. Following the sale of the company for $23 million to Jupitermedia in 2007, Laurel remained with the company through June, 2011.

In 2012, Touby began investing in seed-stage startups, including Appboy (now Braze.com), Credijusto, Electric.ai, Fashion GPS (now LaunchMetrics.com), and others. She is an investor in Lowercase Capital and Pershing Square, among other funds.

Touby is active as a public speaker and has hosted “Secrets of Successful Startups“ on CBS Interactive.

== Awards ==
In 2007, she earned the Entrepreneur of the Year Award from Smith College. In 2007, mediabistro.com won the Small Business of the Year award from the Manhattan Chamber of Commerce.

== Personal life ==
Touby is married to Jon Fine, former media reporter for BusinessWeek and former Executive Director of Editorial at Inc. Magazine. They live in a 4,000 sq ft loft near Union Square in New York City.
