= WNAC-TV (Boston) =

Television station in Boston (1948–1982)

- Boston, Massachusetts; United States
- Channels: Analog: 7 (VHF)

Programming
- Affiliations: CBS (1948–1961 and 1972–1982); ABC (secondary 1948–1957, full-time 1961–1972); DuMont (secondary, 1948–1956)

Ownership
- Owner: RKO General
- Sister stations: WNAC/WRKO; WNAC-FM/WRKO-FM/WROR

History
- First air date: June 21, 1948
- Last air date: May 22, 1982
- Call sign meaning: Sequentially assigned to former radio sister station WNAC

WNAC-TV (channel 7) was a television station in Boston, Massachusetts, United States, owned by RKO General. Originally established in 1948, WNAC-TV signed off for the final time at 1 a.m. on May 22, 1982, due to improprieties by its parent company; it was replaced that morning with WNEV-TV (now WHDH), which operates on a separate license. The station was Boston's original CBS television affiliate; except for a period from 1961 to 1972 during which it was an ABC affiliate, WNAC-TV would remain with CBS until its replacement with WNEV-TV.

== History ==
=== Origins ===
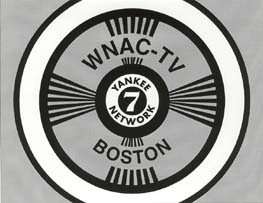
A modern re-production of the test pattern used by the station early on.

WNAC-TV first signed on the air on June 21, 1948, as the second television station in Boston after WBZ-TV (channel 4), which had debuted 12 days earlier. Channel 7 originally operated as a CBS affiliate but also carried some programs from ABC and the DuMont Television Network. The station was originally owned by General Tire, along with WNAC (1260 AM), which served as the flagship station of the Yankee Network, a regional New England radio network. General Tire had purchased the Yankee Network in 1943. WNAC-TV first broadcast from the WNAC/Yankee Network studios at 21 Brookline Avenue, near Fenway Park, before RKO moved its Boston operations to new facilities near Government Center at 40 Hawkins Street (later renamed 7 Bulfinch Place) in 1968.

In 1950, General Tire bought the West Coast regional Don Lee Broadcasting System. Two years later, it acquired the Bamberger Broadcasting Service (owners of WOR-AM-FM-TV in New York City) and merged its broadcasting interests into a new division, General Teleradio. General Tire purchased RKO Radio Pictures in 1955 after General Tire found that RKO's film library would be a perfect programming source for WNAC-TV and its other television stations. The studio was merged into General Teleradio to become RKO Teleradio; after the film studio was dissolved, the business was renamed RKO General in 1959.

By 1955, ABC began to increase the amount of programming seen as "secondary clearances" on channel 7, which continued until WHDH-TV (channel 5) signed on in 1957. However, WNAC-TV was in danger of losing its CBS affiliation that same year when Storer Broadcasting (which had very good relations with CBS) planned to purchase WMUR-TV (channel 9) in nearby Manchester, New Hampshire, and move its transmitter to just outside Haverhill, Massachusetts, 20 miles (32 km) north of Boston; approval of the move would have potentially made WNAC-TV a full-time ABC affiliate and resulted in channel 5 becoming an independent station. However, Storer's purchase of channel 9 never materialized following an outcry from New Hampshire viewers that led regulators to reject its request to build a new tower near Haverhill. Storer eventually entered Boston with its purchase of UHF station WIHS-TV (channel 38) in 1966, changing its call letters to WSBK-TV. The station also had a secondary affiliation with the Paramount Television Network and was among Paramount's strongest affiliates, carrying programs such as Time For Beany, Dixie Showboat, Hollywood Reel and Armchair Detective. From 1948 to 1950, WNAC-TV shared the rights to Boston Braves game telecasts with WBZ-TV and shared rights to Boston Red Sox telecasts with WBZ-TV from 1948 to 1954. In the fall of 1948, WNAC-TV became the first station to televise Boston Bruins games, carrying the third, and sometimes second, period of home games.

WNAC-TV was nearly sold by RKO General, along with its radio sisters, to NBC as part of a multi-city transaction and station trade between the two companies announced in March 1960. As a preemptive move, CBS decided to move its Boston affiliation to WHDH-TV when the changeover became official. However, final approval of the RKO-NBC deal was held up at the Federal Communications Commission (FCC) and the U.S. Department of Justice because of issues involving NBC's ownership of WRCV-AM-TV in Philadelphia, which RKO would acquire in the trade. Meanwhile, WNAC-TV reached an agreement to carry ABC programs in what was thought to be an interim arrangement. The affiliation swap between WNAC-TV and WHDH-TV took effect on January 1, 1961. The RKO-NBC transaction never materialized, and channel 7 would remain an RKO-owned ABC affiliate for the next 11 years.

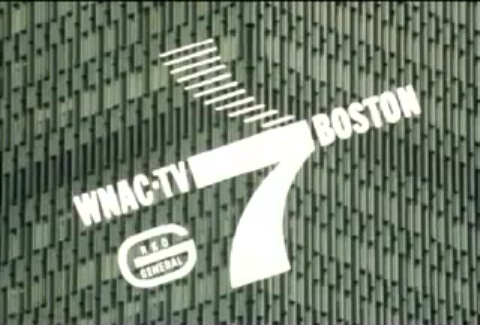
A 1960s on-air station slide superimposed onto an image of the Prudential Tower.

In 1969, the Boston Herald-Traveler Corp., WHDH-TV's parent company, lost its license to operate channel 5. Boston Broadcasters, Inc., the owners of the station that replaced it, WCVB-TV, planned to air more local programming than any other station in the country, heavily preempting CBS programming in the process. CBS was displeased with the prospect of frequent preemptions on what would have been its second-largest affiliate and its largest on the East Coast. The CBS affiliation immediately moved back to channel 7, leaving channel 5 to affiliate with ABC. The second network switch in Boston—essentially a reversal of what took place in 1961—occurred on March 19, 1972, WCVB-TV's first day of operations. However, late in 1973, WNAC-TV adopted a version of the circle 7 logo, similar to that used by ABC's owned-and-operated stations; in 1977, after ABC complained that the station was infringing on its trademark, the station changed the logo's typeface. In late 1981, a stylish, strip-layered "7" was introduced, which would be the last logo redesign under RKO General ownership.

Two legendary Boston television personalities had shows on WNAC-TV: Louise Morgan, who hosted a talk show and was known as "New England's First Lady of Radio and Television", and Ed McDonnell, who, as the astronaut character Major Mudd, hosted a popular children's show from 1961 through 1973.

=== Fight for survival and transition ===
By 1965, RKO General faced numerous investigations into its business and financial practices. Although the FCC renewed channel 7's license in 1969, RKO General lost the license in 1981 after General Tire admitted to a litany of corporate misconduct, including the admission that General Tire had committed financial fraud over illegal political contributions and bribes as part of a settlement with the U.S. Securities and Exchange Commission. However, in the FCC hearings, RKO General had withheld evidence of General Tire's misconduct and had also failed to disclose evidence of accounting errors on its own part. In light of RKO's dishonesty, the FCC stripped RKO of the Boston license and the licenses for KHJ-TV in Los Angeles and WOR-TV. The FCC had previously conditioned renewal of the latter two stations' licenses on WNAC-TV's renewal. An appeals court partially reversed the ruling and ordered new hearings for the Los Angeles and New York licenses, finding that the FCC had overreached in connecting them to WNAC-TV's renewal. However, it upheld the revocation of WNAC-TV's license, finding that RKO's dishonesty alone merited the loss of that license.

RKO appealed this decision, but in February 1982 the FCC awarded a construction permit for a new channel 7 station to New England Television (NETV), a merger of two of the original rivals to the station's license controlled by Boston grocery magnate David Mugar. In April, the U.S. Supreme Court denied its appeal, forcing RKO to surrender the station's license; RKO then sold the non-license assets of WNAC-TV to NETV for $22 million the following month.

On the evening of May 21, 1982, RKO General's final full day of operating WNAC-TV, the station preempted CBS's prime time schedule to broadcast Game 6 of the NBA Eastern Conference Finals between the Boston Celtics and the Philadelphia 76ers (a production of CBS Sports which aired on tape-delay over the rest of the network later that evening). This was followed by a local public-affairs program, the 11 p.m. newscast, and a delayed airing of the series finale of the CBS drama Nurse. Just after 1 a.m. on May 22, following a rebroadcast of the late news, channel 7 signed off for the final time as WNAC-TV. New England Television took over channel 7 at the 5:55 a.m. sign-on that morning under a new license as WNEV-TV.

WNEV-TV acquired WNAC-TV's former studios on Bulfinch Place as well as its transmitter and tower plant in Newton. It also inherited WNAC-TV's CBS affiliation and syndicated-program contracts, along with most of its staff. The station has operated since 1990 under the call letters WHDH-TV and was Boston's NBC affiliate from 1995 to 2016 before becoming a news-intensive independent station. WHDH-TV claims WNAC-TV's pre-1982 history as its own, although it operates under a separate license.

== Programming ==
=== Preempted programming ===
Over the years, WNAC-TV did not preempt much network programming. This fact greatly appealed to CBS when it decided to abandon channel 5 in 1972 (during the transition from WHDH-TV to WCVB-TV) and re-affiliate with WNAC.

=== Sports programming ===
WNAC-TV broadcast games of the Boston Patriots (renamed the New England Patriots in 1971), first through the American Football League's broadcast contract with ABC from 1961 to 1964, and later through CBS's broadcast contract with the NFC from 1973 to 1981. Because CBS held NFC rights during that period, Patriots broadcasts were limited to home interconference games. WNAC-TV also aired Boston Celtics games from 1973 to 1982 through CBS's NBA broadcast rights, including the Celtics' victory in the 1981 NBA Finals.

=== News department history ===
==== 1948–1965 ====
WNAC-TV's first newscasts were sponsored by Shawmut Bank and were named Shawmut Bank Newsteller. The title had a double meaning; that of an anchor who told the news, and that of the program being compared to a bank teller making a withdrawal of news and information from a "news bank", at the public's request (this title was also used on a newscast that Shawmut sponsored on WBZ-TV during this time). This format lasted from WNAC's launch on June 21, 1948, until the early 1950s, when the branding changed to reflect RKO's Yankee Network and its personnel, which also handled news on RKO's radio side. WNAC-TV's relationship with WNAC (680 AM) was also touted more starting at this time. From then on through the mid-1960s, the newscasts were known as Yankee Network News.

==== 1965–1972 ====
By 1967, most of WNAC's in-house productions, including news and public affairs programs, began to be broadcast in color. Several years later, the newscasts' titles were changed to New England Today (for morning and noon newscasts) and New England Tonight (for the 6 and 11 p.m. broadcasts). Reporter John Henning briefly served as the station's lead anchor before leaving for (the original channel 5) WHDH-TV because, as he complained, the station was more interested in feature films than news. In 1970, the station was the first to promote its newscasts with a music package based on a jingle, called "Move Closer to Your World" (WNAC's slogan at the time was "7 Colors Your World", later used by Australia's Seven Network). Two years later, WNAC's news director moved to Philadelphia's WPVI-TV and took the theme music with him, where it became iconically associated with that station. Also during this era, a series of anchor teams led the newscasts, including Jim Hale and Howard Nielsen and later Hale and Ken Thomas. The station revamped its anchor desk entirely in 1970, naming Lee Nelson and Chuck Scarborough as the anchor team. After serving in the role from 1970 to 1974, Scarborough moved to WNBC in New York City, where he retired on December 12, 2024, after 50 years at the station.

==== 1972–1982 ====
The New England Today/Tonight format lasted until mid-1972, just months after the switch from ABC to CBS. RKO General then revised the station's on-air image once again to now include the moniker "Boston 7". The station's newscasts were titled Boston 7 Newsroom from 1972 to 1974 when it was shortened to Newsroom 7. For WNAC's final year on the Channel 7 position (1981–82), the newscasts were simply named News 7.

Despite its links with the Yankee Network's well-respected news department (which came to an end when RKO General closed the network in 1967), WNAC-TV spent most of its first 20 years on the air as a distant third (and a distant second until 1957) in the Boston ratings, behind WBZ-TV. However, the station had begun to be fairly competitive in the early 1970s. For a brief period in 1974, WNAC's 6 p.m. newscast jumped from third place to first. Ted O'Brien, who had replaced Scarborough as the station's primary anchor, remained as lead anchor until being paired with Jay Scott, a young reporter who was hired with a publicity campaign claiming that the news director, on a nationwide talent hunt, had found Scott in a hotel room in Denver, where he had watched television looking for talent. A few years later, John Henning returned to the station from WCVB-TV as Scott's replacement. Henning was joined on WNAC's newscasts by station standbys Eddie Andelman and Dr. Fred Ward and reporters Gary Armstrong, Gayle Sinibaldo, Charlene Mitchell, Tanya Hart, Mike Levine, and Sheila Fox.

The RKO licensing difficulties over the next few years were accompanied by a drop in the ratings, caused by overall leadership instability with multiple general managers and news directors revolving in and out of 7 Bulfinch Place. WCVB's large-scale public service and news division remit, and a commitment to put the tarnished image of the former channel 5's licensee in the rear view, also easily overwhelmed WNAC. In 1979, the station hired its first female lead anchor, when Mary Richardson was hired to co-anchor the 11 p.m. broadcast. In 1980, Brad Holbrook was added as Henning's new co-anchor. Henning left the station in June 1981 after his four-year contract expired.

During the 1970s and early 1980s, the station's news department suffered a number of blunders. During a December 1977 broadcast, anchor Jack Cole quipped sardonically that "We'll be back with more alleged news" following a report on how to chimney sweep in advance of the arrival of Santa Claus. On April 1, 1980, the station aired a news report that stated that Great Blue Hill in Milton, Massachusetts, was erupting. The story was an April Fools' joke, but the prank resulted in panic in Milton. The station's image was also tarnished by the arrests of reporter Charlene Mitchell for shoplifting and sports reporter Bob Gamere for drunk driving, as well as the revelation that former reporter Stephen Guptill falsely claimed two degrees on his resume.

In mid-1981, the station formed an investigative-reporting unit dubbed "The Newsbreakers". It consisted of reporters Mike Taibbi and Bill Selby, and producer Paul Toomey.

In the year leading up to RKO's sale of channel 7's assets to David Mugar after losing its licensing appeal, the station hired Susan Brady to co-anchor with Brad Holbrook. The changes did not cease during WNAC's remaining months. After RKO's loss of the WNAC license in 1980 was upheld by the Federal Court of Appeals for the District of Columbia, Brady left for a position in Los Angeles. She was quickly replaced by young weekend anchor Susan Burke, who worked with Holbrook both during the transition from RKO to New England Television and for the first months of the new ownership.

==== Notable former on-air staff ====
- Eddie Andelman – sports critic at large (1972–1976)
- Paul Benzaquin – talk show host (1970–1975)
- David Brudnoy – commentator (1973–1982)
- John Dennis – sports anchor (1977–1982)
- Bob Gamere – sports anchor and host of Candlepins for Cash (1975–1982)
- Bob Gallagher – sports anchor
- Stephen Guptill – elderly affairs reporter, The Elder American host (1975–1978)
- John Henning – anchor (1964–1968, 1977–1981)
- Harvey Leonard – chief meteorologist (1977–1982)
- Chuck Scarborough – anchor (1972–1974)
- Mike Taibbi – investigative reporter (1977–1982)
