= Henry D. Winslow =

Massachusetts politician (1919–1999)

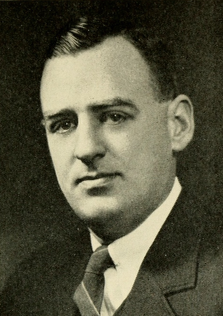
- Portrait of Henry D. Winslow, 1945

Member of the Massachusetts House of Representatives from the 2nd Middlesex district
- In office 1941–1950

Personal details
- Born: September 24, 1919 Cambridge, Massachusetts, US
- Died: March 8, 1999 (aged 79) Lexington, Massachusetts, US
- Education: Harvard College (BA); Harvard Law School (LLB)

Henry D. Winslow (September 24, 1919– March 8, 1999) was an American politician who was the member of the Massachusetts House of Representatives from the 2nd Middlesex district.
