= John MacGovern =

American politician (born 1951)

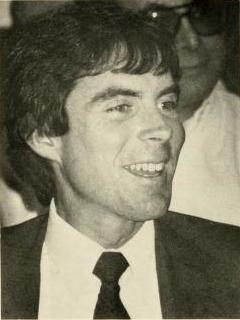
- MacGovern in 1985

Member of the Massachusetts House of Representatives from the 2nd Middlesex district
- In office January 3, 1983 – January 3, 1991
- Preceded by: Walter Bickford
- Succeeded by: Geoff Hall

Personal details
- Born: July 14, 1951 (age 75) Cambridge, Massachusetts, U.S.
- Party: Republican
- Education: Dartmouth College (BA)

John F. MacGovern (born July 14, 1951) is an American politician who represented the 2nd Middlesex district in the Massachusetts House of Representatives from 1983 to 1991. He was the Republican nominee in the Massachusetts's 5th congressional district election in 1990, losing to incumbent Chester G. Atkins 52% to 48%. He later moved to Vermont. He was an unsuccessful candidate for the Vermont Senate in 2004 and 2006. He unsuccessfully ran as the Republican nominee for the United States Senate seat held by Bernie Sanders in the 2012 election.

== See also ==
- United States Senate election in Vermont, 2012
- United States House of Representatives elections, 1990

Massachusetts House of Representatives
Preceded by Walter Bickford	Member of the Massachusetts House of Representatives from the 2nd Middlesex district 1983–1991	Succeeded by Geoff Hall
Party political offices
Preceded by Richard Tarrant	Republican nominee for U.S. Senator from Vermont (Class 1); 2012	Succeeded by Brooke Paige
