= Walter Bickford =

American civil engineer and politician

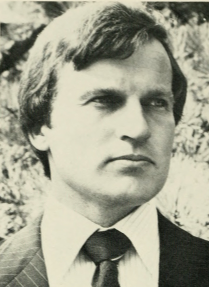

Commissioner of the Massachusetts Department of Fisheries and Wildlife
- In office 1983–1991

Member of the Massachusetts House of Representatives
- In office 1977–1983
- Preceded by: Robert C. Reynolds
- Succeeded by: John MacGovern
- Constituency: 17th Worcester (1977–1979); 2nd Middlesex (1979–1983)

Personal details
- Born: February 16, 1942 (age 84) Marlborough, Massachusetts
- Party: Democratic
- Education: University of Alaska; Wentworth Institute of Technology; University of Massachusetts Amherst
- Occupation: Civil Engineer; Politician

Walter E. Bickford (born February 16, 1942) is an American civil engineer and politician who served in the Massachusetts House of Representatives from 1977 to 1983 and served as Commissioner of the Massachusetts Department of Fisheries and Wildlife from 1983 to 1991. In 1999 he ran in the special election for the Massachusetts Senate seat in the Middlesex and Worcester District vacated by Robert Durand. He lost in the Democratic primary to Pam Resor.

Massachusetts House of Representatives
Preceded by Robert C. Reynolds	Member of the Massachusetts House of Representatives from the 17th Worcester district 1977–1979	Succeeded by Robert D. McNeil
Preceded by Thomas H. D. Mahoney	Member of the Massachusetts House of Representatives from the 2nd Middlesex district 1979–1983	Succeeded by John MacGovern
