= Great Blue Hill =

Large hill near Boston, Massachusetts, United States

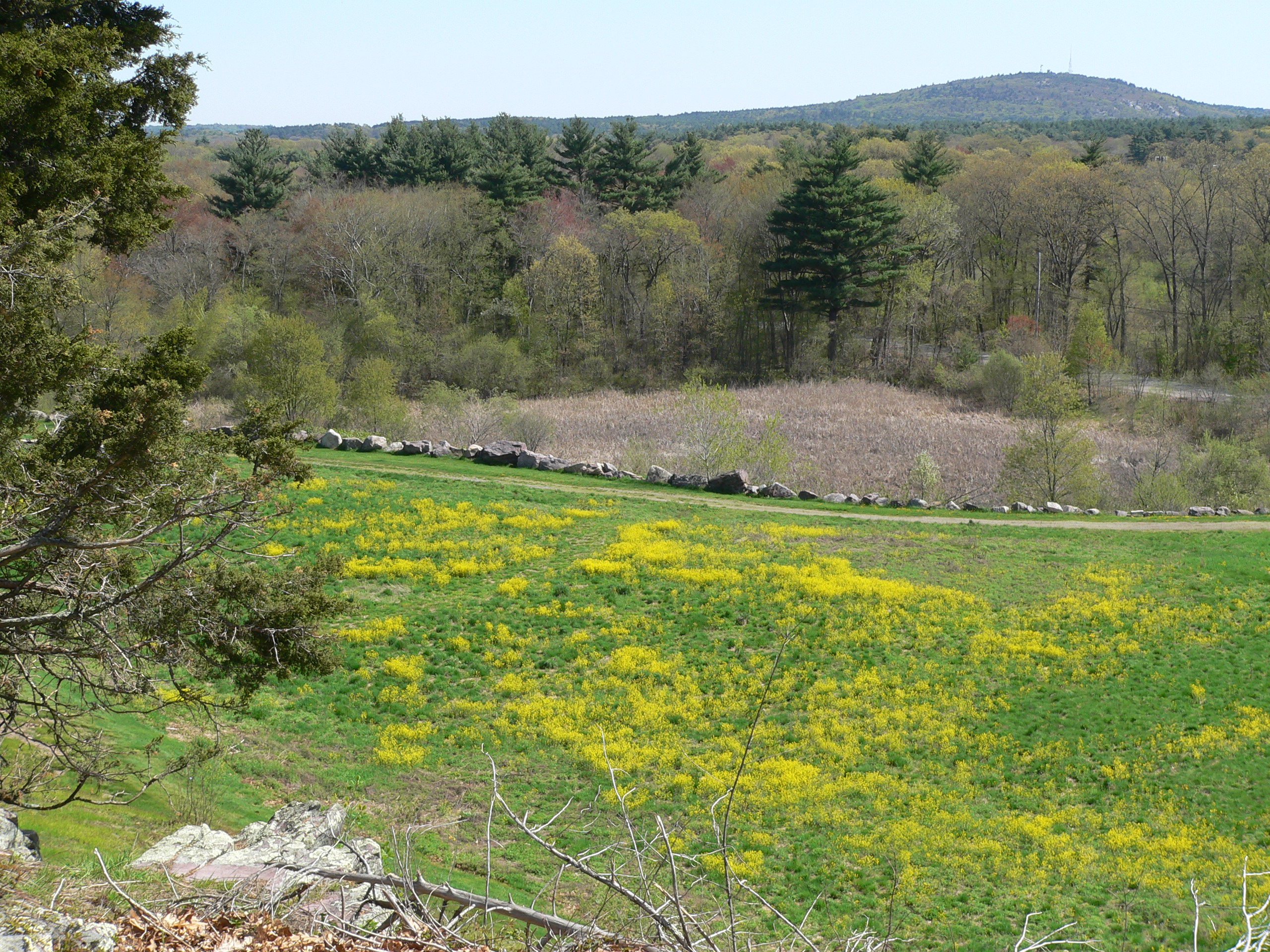
- View of Great Blue Hill from neighboring Signal Hill

Highest point
- Elevation: 635 ft (193.5 m)
- Prominence: 483 ft (147 m)
- Coordinates: 42°12′43″N 71°06′56″W

Geography
- Location: Norfolk County, Massachusetts
- Parent range: Blue Hills
- Topo map: USGS Norwood

Great Blue Hill is a hill of 635 feet (194 m) located within the Blue Hills Reservation in Milton, Randolph and Canton, Massachusetts, about 10 miles (16 km) south of downtown Boston. It is the highest point in Norfolk County, and the Greater Boston area, and the tallest of the 22 hills that make up the Blue Hills chain in the Blue Hills Reservation.

The modern name for the hill was given by early English colonists who, while sailing along the coastline, noticed the bluish hue of the exposed granite faces when viewed from a distance (due to Riebeckite). The Blue Hills' eastern slopes face the ocean and lie within Quincy. The area once attracted quarrying for its "blue granite".

Great Blue Hill was a point of reference for the Indians, and the local tribe were known as the "people at the large hill" (Massachuseuck). The English called them the Massachusetts, which ultimately became the name of the state.

== Geography ==
The north and west sides of Great Blue Hill drain into the Neponset River, and thence into Boston Harbor. The south and east sides of Great Blue Hill drain into the Blue Hill River, thence into the Farm River, Monatiquot River, Weymouth Fore River, and into Boston Harbor.

Its summit is the highest point in Greater Boston and Norfolk County and also the highest within 10 miles of the Atlantic coast south of central Maine. For this reason, American meteorologist Abbott Lawrence Rotch chose Great Blue Hill as the site for an observatory, which became known as the Blue Hill Meteorological Observatory after its completion in 1885. Rotch conducted ground-breaking studies of the atmosphere at Blue Hill for many years, and meteorological data is still gathered at the site. From the Eliot Tower at the summit, the city of Boston and many of the surrounding hills of the Milton and Canton area are visible.

== Other information ==
Great Blue Hill, and the Blue Hills Reservation in general, is a popular hiking destination, valued as much for its splendid trails and views as for its proximity to the metropolitan area. There is also alpine skiing available at Blue Hills Ski Area, consisting of eight trails served by a double chair and two surface lifts.

Summit Road, the steep paved road that leads to the top of the hill, is closed to cars except for employees of the weather observatory. However, the road is open to hikers and cyclists.

Boston public radio and television stations WGBH (FM)/WGBH-TV take their call letters from Great Blue Hill, which was the original location of the station's FM and TV transmitters. WGBH (FM) still transmits from the site, grandfathered at an effective radiated power of 98,000 watts. WGBH-TV moved its antenna to a taller tower in Needham in the 1960s. WZRM, an FM station licensed to Brockton, moved its transmitter northward from near Brockton to Great Blue Hill in 2005 to better serve Boston. The NOAA Weather Radio station serving Greater Boston and adjacent coastal waters, KHB35, transmits atop the hill as well.

In 1980, the hill was the subject of a prank by WNAC-TV's news department, where it was alleged that a volcano was erupting.

Great Blue Hill and the Blue Hills Reservation is the last remaining area in Greater Boston where the timber rattlesnake and copperhead can be found. The snakes are so rare in the state that they are rarely encountered by people. They are both considered endangered, making it illegal to harass, kill, collect, or possess.

== Gallery ==
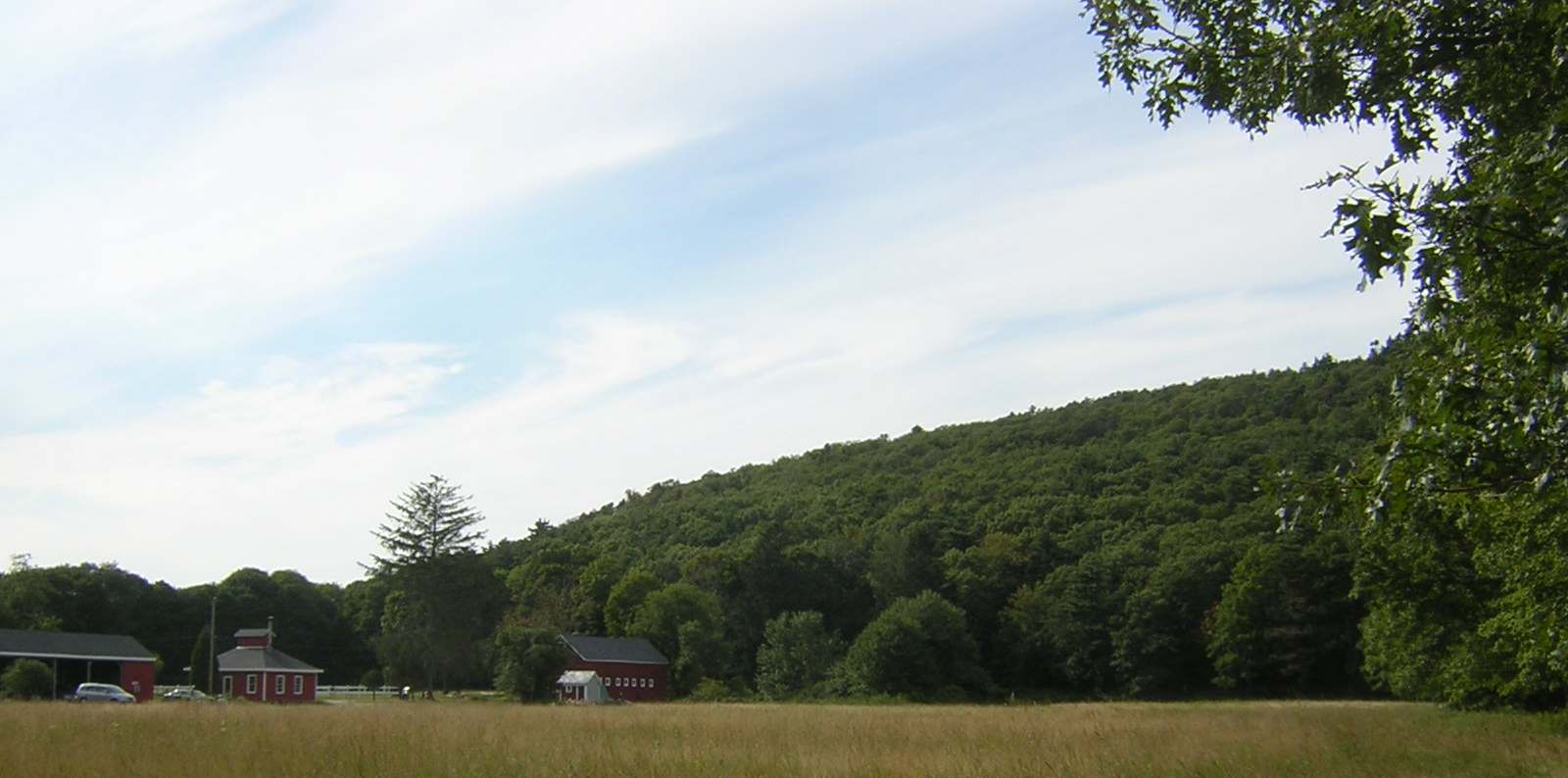
The hill from Brookwood Farm

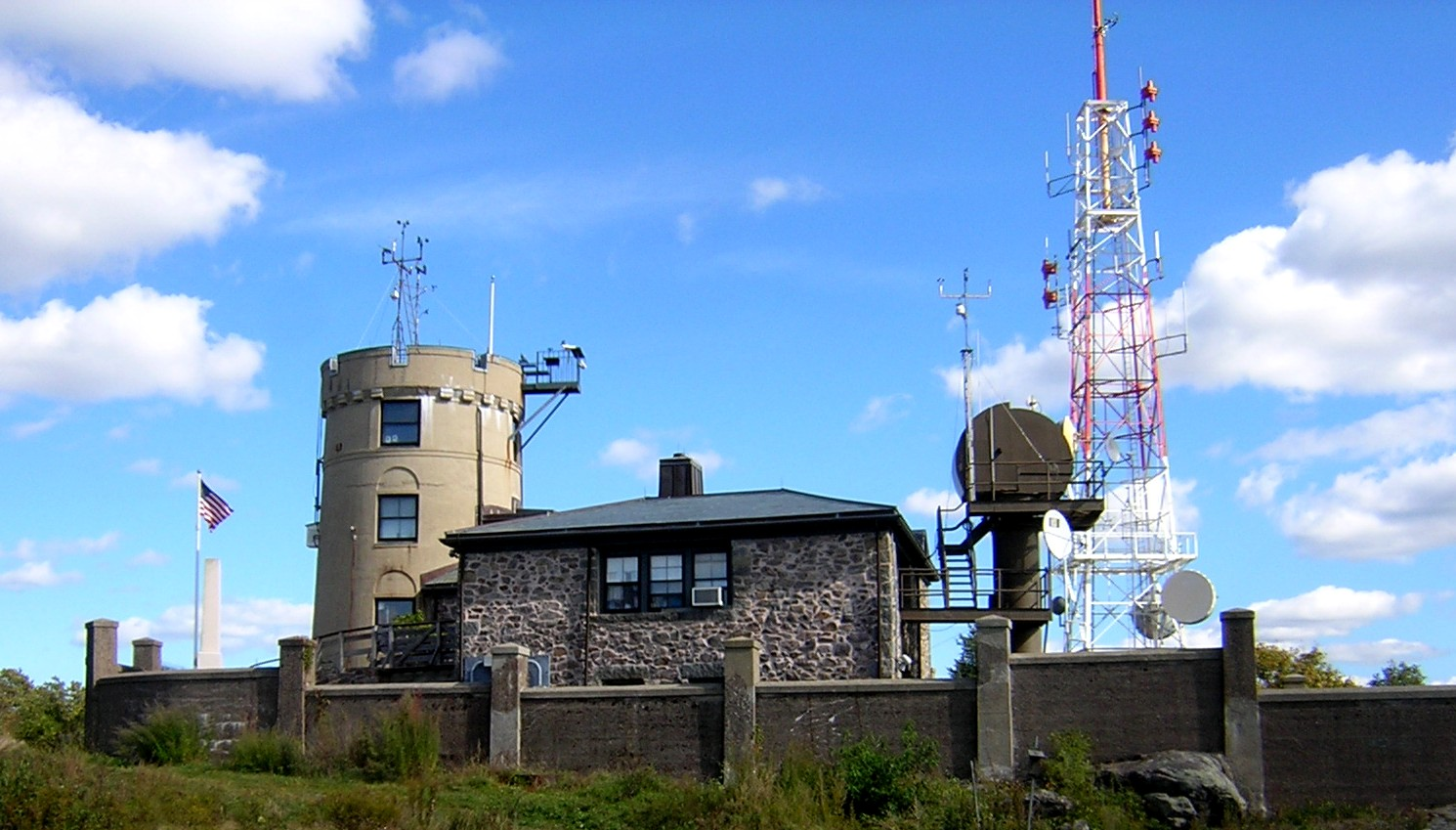
The weather observatory

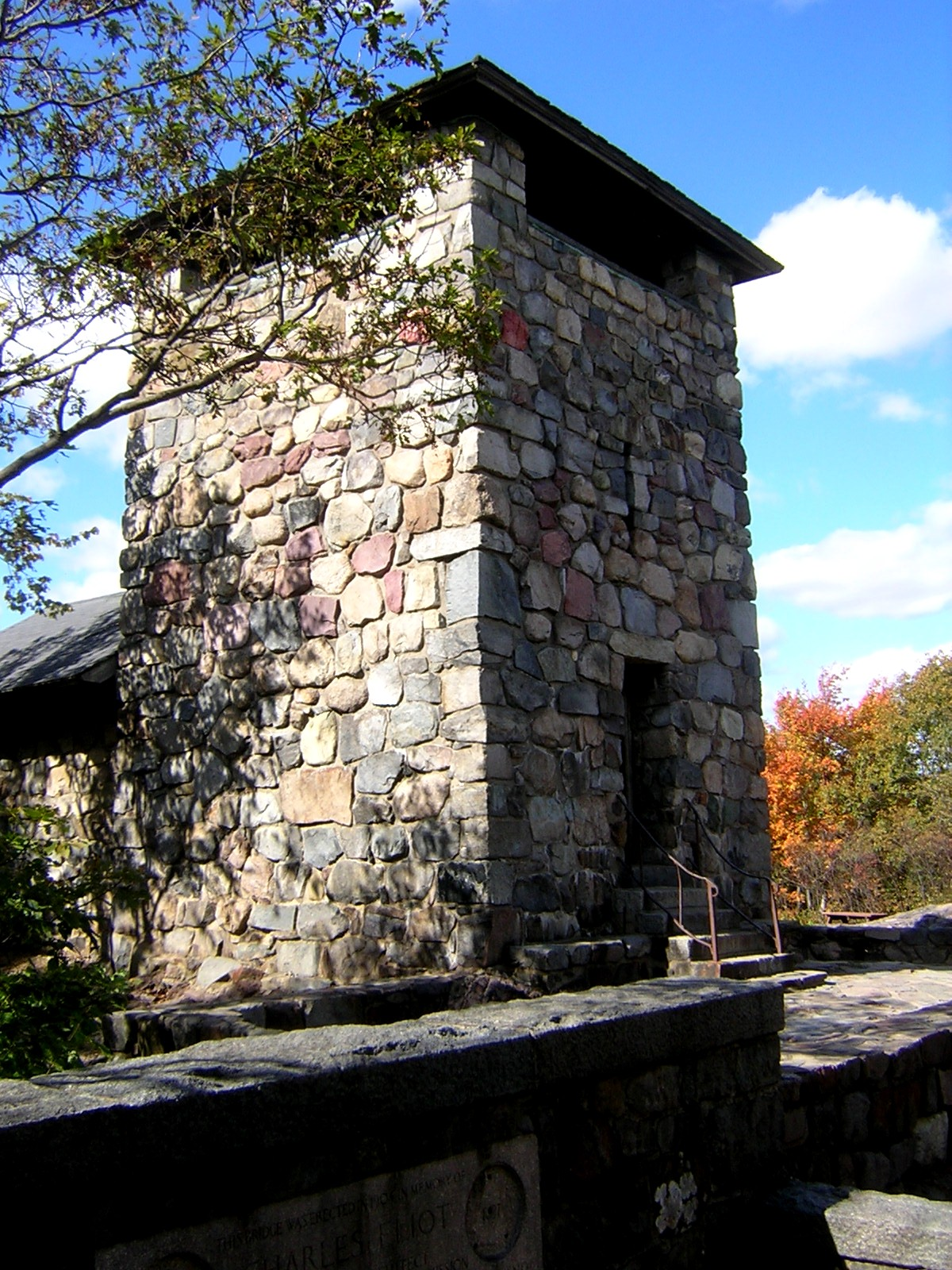
Eliot Memorial Bridge and Tower

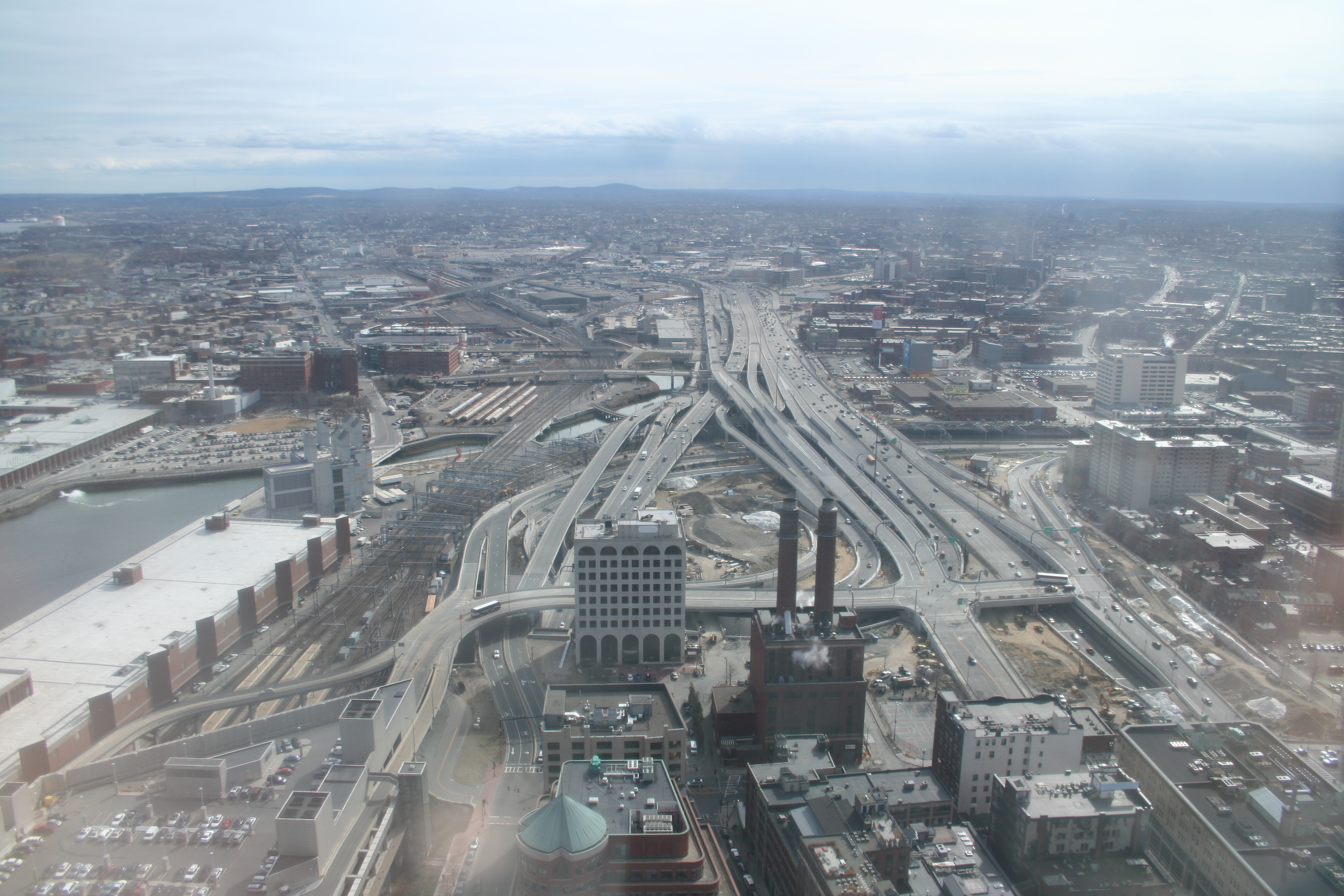
The South Bay interchange (looking south) to the Southeast Expressway with Great Blue Hill visible in the background

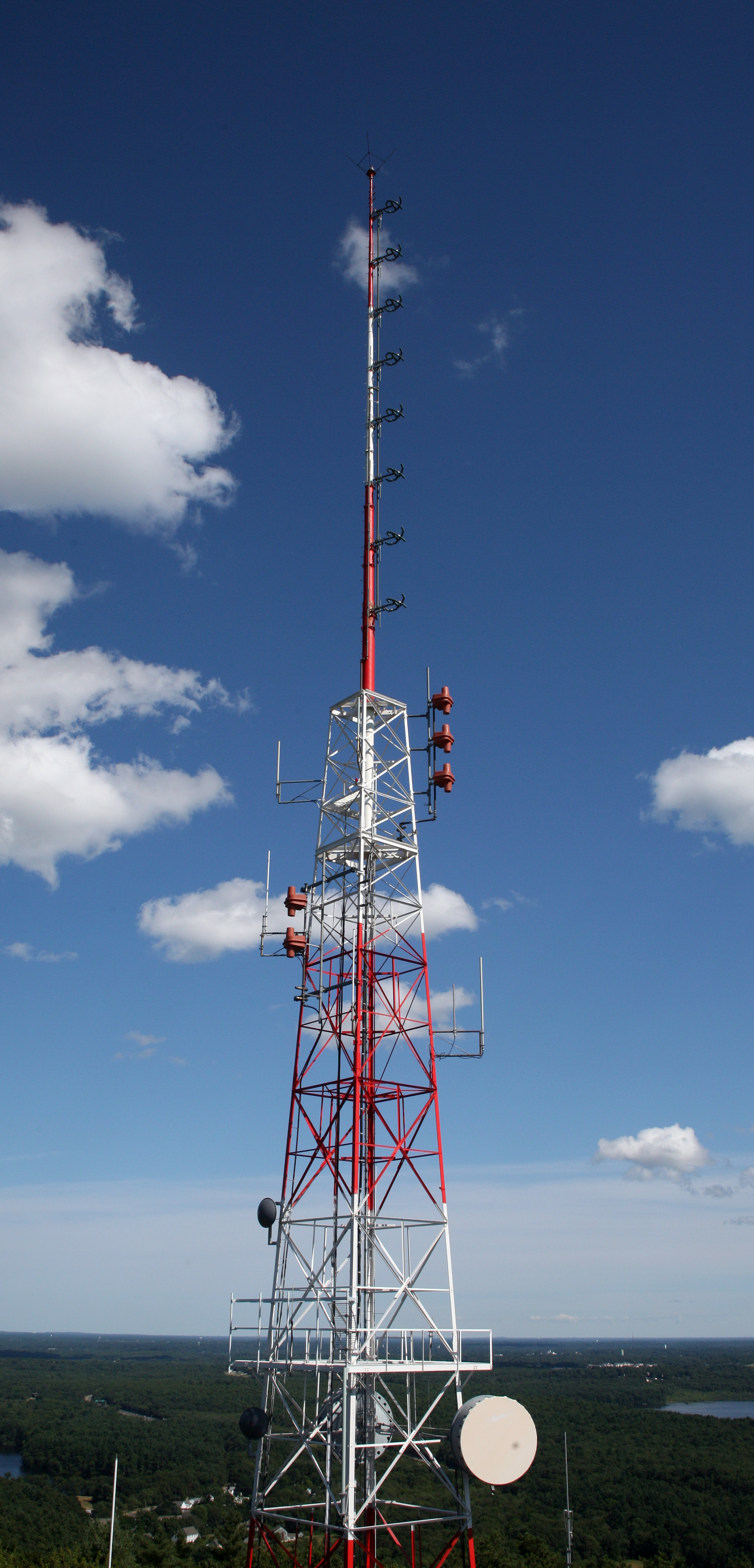
Radio transmitter of WGBH (FM)
