= 2012 United States Senate election in Vermont =

- November 6, 2012
- Turnout: 63.47% (voting eligible)
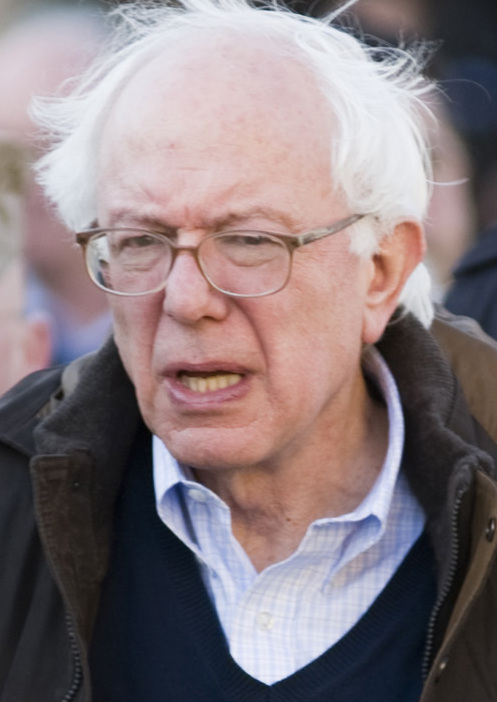

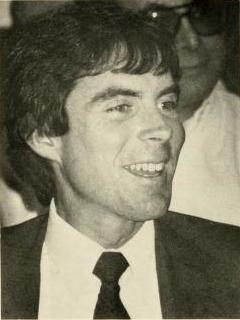
Nominee	Bernie Sanders	John MacGovern
Party	Independent	Republican
Popular vote	207,848	72,898
Percentage	71.00%	24.90%
- Sanders: 50–60% 60–70% 70–80% 80–90%
U.S. senator before election
Bernie Sanders
Independent
Elected U.S. Senator
Bernie Sanders
Independent

The 2012 United States Senate election in Vermont was held on November 6, 2012. Incumbent independent Senator Bernie Sanders won reelection to a second term in a landslide, defeating Republican nominee John MacGovern with 71% of the vote and winning every county, municipality, and precinct. Sanders, the self-described democratic socialist, was first elected with 65% of the vote in 2006 and was the first non-Republican to win this seat since 1850.

== Democratic primary ==
=== Candidates ===
- Bernie Sanders, incumbent U.S. Senator

Sanders also received the nomination of the Vermont Progressive Party, but declined both the Democratic and Progressive nominations after the primary.

== Republican primary ==
=== Candidates ===
==== Declared ====
- John MacGovern, former Massachusetts State Representative
- H. Brooke Paige, former CEO of Remmington News Service

==== Declined ====
- Kevin Dorn, former Secretary of the Vermont Agency of Commerce and Community Development
- Jim Douglas, former governor
- Thom Lauzon, Mayor of Barre
- Tom Salmon, state auditor

=== Results ===
Republican primary results
Party	Candidate	Votes	%
Republican	John MacGovern	6,343	75.4
Republican	H. Brooke Paige	2,073	24.6
Total votes		8,416	100.0

== General election ==
=== Candidates ===
- Peter Diamondstone (Liberty Union), perennial candidate
- Cris Ericson (U.S. Marijuana), perennial candidate (also running for Governor)
- Laurel LaFramboise (VoteKISS)
- John MacGovern (Republican), former Massachusetts State Representative
- Peter Moss (Peace and Prosperity)
- Bernie Sanders (I), incumbent U.S. Senator

=== Predictions ===
Source	Ranking	As of
The Cook Political Report	Solid I	November 1, 2012
Sabato's Crystal Ball	Safe I	November 5, 2012
Rothenberg Political Report	Safe I	November 2, 2012
Real Clear Politics	Safe I	November 5, 2012

=== Debates ===
- Complete video of debate, October 25, 2012 - C-SPAN

=== Polling ===
Hypothetical polling

Poll source	Date(s) administered	Sample size	Margin of error	Randy Brock (R)	Bernie Sanders (I)	Other	Undecided
Public Policy Polling	July 28–31, 2011	1,233	±2.8%	28%	65%	—	7%

Poll source	Date(s) administered	Sample size	Margin of error	Jim Douglas (R)	Bernie Sanders (I)	Other	Undecided
Public Policy Polling	July 28–31, 2011	1,233	±2.8%	38%	56%	—	6%

Poll source	Date(s) administered	Sample size	Margin of error	Brian Dubie (R)	Bernie Sanders (I)	Other	Undecided
Public Policy Polling	July 28–31, 2011	1,233	±2.8%	34%	60%	—	6%

Poll source	Date(s) administered	Sample size	Margin of error	Thom Lauzon (R)	Bernie Sanders (I)	Other	Undecided
Public Policy Polling	July 28–31, 2011	1,233	±2.8%	24%	63%	—	13%

Poll source	Date(s) administered	Sample size	Margin of error	Tom Salmon (R)	Bernie Sanders (I)	Other	Undecided
Public Policy Polling	July 28–31, 2011	1,233	±2.8%	28%	62%	—	10%

Poll source	Date(s) administered	Sample size	Margin of error	Phil Scott (R)	Bernie Sanders (I)	Other	Undecided
Public Policy Polling	July 28–31, 2011	1,233	±2.8%	30%	61%	—	9%

Poll source	Date(s) administered	Sample size	Margin of error	Mark Snelling (R)	Bernie Sanders (I)	Other	Undecided
Public Policy Polling	July 28–31, 2011	1,233	±2.8%	25%	62%	—	13%

=== Results ===
United States Senate election in Vermont, 2012
Party	Candidate	Votes	%	±%
Independent	Bernie Sanders (incumbent)	207,848	71.00%	+5.59%
Republican	John MacGovern	72,898	24.90%	−7.46%
Marijuana	Cris Ericson	5,924	2.02%	N/A
Liberty Union	Peter Diamondstone	2,511	0.86%	+0.55%
Peace and Prosperity	Peter Moss	2,452	0.84%	+0.26%
VoteKISS	Laurel LaFramboise	877	0.30%	N/A
Write-in		252	0.08%	-0.02%
Total votes		292,762	100.00%	N/A
Independent hold				

==== By county ====
County	Bernie Sanders Independent		John MacGovern Republican		Various candidates Other parties	
County	#	%	#	%	#	%
Addison	12,845	72.4%	4,324	24.37%	572	3.23%
Bennington	11,525	67.28%	4,437	25.9%	1,168	6.82%
Caledonia	8,763	65.08%	4,158	30.88%	545	4.04%
Chittenden	55,615	73.69%	17,369	23.01%	2,491	3.3%
Essex	1,746	63.82%	848	30.99%	142	5.19%
Franklin	13,607	68.97%	5,336	27.05%	787	3.98%
Grand Isle	2,769	68.68%	1,119	27.75%	144	3.57%
Lamoille	8,701	73.67%	2,672	22.62%	438	3.71%
Orange	9,750	70.38%	3,533	25.5%	570	4.12%
Orleans	8,033	69.53%	3,106	26.88%	414	3.59%
Rutland	18,286	65.13%	8,577	30.55%	1,214	4.32%
Washington	21,502	74.23%	6,448	22.26%	1,017	3.51%
Windham	16,050	74.7%	4,143	19.28%	1,294	6.02%
Windsor	19,861	70.41%	7,128	25.27%	1,220	4.33%
Totals	209,053	71.04%	73,198	24.87%	12,016	4.09%
