= Dan Henning =

American football player and coach (born 1942)

No. 15
- Position: Quarterback

Personal information
- Born: June 21, 1942 (age 84); Bronx, New York, U.S.

Career information
- High school: St. Francis Prep (Fresh Meadows, Queens)
- College: William & Mary (1961–1963)

Career history

Playing
- San Diego Chargers (1964, 1966–1967)

Coaching
- Florida State (1968–1970) Assistant coach; Virginia Tech (1971) Offensive coordinator; Houston Oilers (1972) Quarterbacks coach; Virginia Tech (1973) Offensive coordinator; Florida State (1974) Offensive coordinator; New York Jets (1976–1978) Wide receivers coach; Miami Dolphins (1979–1980) Quarterbacks & wide receivers coach; Washington Redskins (1981–1982) Offensive coordinator; Atlanta Falcons (1983–1986) Head coach; Washington Redskins (1987–1988) Offensive coordinator; San Diego Chargers (1989–1991) Head coach; Detroit Lions (1992–1993) Offensive coordinator; Boston College (1994–1996) Head coach; Buffalo Bills (1997) Offensive coordinator; New York Jets (1998–2000); Quarterbacks coach (1998–1999); Offensive coordinator (2000); Carolina Panthers (2002–2006) Offensive coordinator; Miami Dolphins (2008–2010) Offensive coordinator

Awards and highlights
- 2× Super Bowl champion (XVII, XXII)

Head coaching record
- Career: 38–73–1 (NFL); 16–19–1 (college)
- Coaching profile at Pro Football Reference
- Stats at Pro Football Reference

Daniel Ernest Henning (born June 21, 1942) is an American former professional football player and coach. A quarterback, he played college football for William & Mary before playing professionally for the San Diego Chargers of the American Football League (AFL) in 1966. Henning served as a head coach in the National Football League (NFL) for the Atlanta Falcons (1983–1986) and the Chargers (1989–1991). He was the head football coach at Boston College from 1994 to 1996. Henning then returned to the NFL as an offensive coordinator for the Buffalo Bills in 1997. After Hall of Fame coach Marv Levy retired, reportedly partially due to his reluctance to fire Henning, Henning left Buffalo.

== Coaching career ==
While the head coach of Boston College, Henning discovered a major sports betting scandal among his own players, the second major gambling scandal to affect Boston College athletics in less than 20 years. It had been an open secret that football players were gambling, even though NCAA rules bar any form of gambling by student-athletes. However, after a 45-17 thumping at the hands of Syracuse on October 26, 1996, Henning heard rumors that players were betting against their own team. At a team meeting later that week, Henning asked anyone who was involved in gambling to stand up. No one did so. After the Eagles lost a close game to Pittsburgh a week later—one in which they were 11-point favorites—an irate Henning demanded that anyone involved in gambling come forward. At a players-only meeting two days later, anywhere from 25 to 30 players admitted gambling, but the five that the captains suspected of betting against their own team failed to own up. Henning notified university officials of his suspicions, and they were concerned enough to call in Middlesex County district attorney Thomas Reilly, who launched an investigation.

The resulting inquiry resulted in the suspension of 13 players for the final three games of the season, and eight of them never played another down for the Eagles. With the effects of the scandal and a 16–19–1 record after three seasons, Henning retired at the end of the 1996 season.

Henning had two stints as the offensive coordinator with the Washington Redskins (1981–82, 1987–88). He won two Super Bowl rings during this time.

He was the offensive coordinator for the Carolina Panthers from 2002 until January 2007. Henning helped lead his team to the Super Bowl after the 2003 season. After the 2005 season in which the Panthers returned to the NFC Championship game, they were considered Super Bowl contenders in 2006. However, the offense struggled due to injuries and what critics deemed conservative play-calling by Henning, resulting in an 8–8 season and his firing.

In 2008, Henning was named offensive coordinator for the Miami Dolphins, throwing wrinkles in the offense which put Ronnie Brown as quarterback leading to a 38–13 win at the New England Patriots. His implementation of the "Wildcat" and single-wing offense, which he had previously used in Carolina with DeAngelo Williams, was covered heavily by the media, and soon adopted by several other NFL teams in 2008 and 2009.

== Personal life ==
His son, Dan, played college football as a quarterback at Maryland under head coach Bobby Ross. His brother, John Henning was a long time Boston news reporter.

== Head coaching record ==
=== College ===
Year	Team	Overall	Conference	Standing	Bowl/playoffs	Coaches^{#}	AP^{°}
Boston College Eagles (Big East Conference) (1994–1996)
1994	Boston College	7–4–1	3–3–1	5th	W Aloha	22	23
1995	Boston College	4–8	4–3	T–4th			
1996	Boston College	5–7	2–5	6th			
Boston College:		16–19–1	9–11–1				
Total:		16–19–1					
^{#}Rankings from final Coaches Poll.; ^{°}Rankings from final AP Poll.

=== NFL ===
Team	Year	Regular Season					Postseason			
Team	Year	Won	Lost	Ties	Win %	Finish	Won	Lost	Win %	Result
ATL	1983	7	9	0	.438	4th in NFC West	–	–	–	–
ATL	1984	4	12	0	.250	4th in NFC West	–	–	–	–
ATL	1985	4	12	0	.250	4th in NFC West	–	–	–	–
ATL	1986	7	8	1	.469	3rd in NFC West	–	–	–	–
ATL Total		22	41	1	.352		–	–	–	
SD	1989	6	10	0	.375	5th in AFC West	–	–	–	–
SD	1990	6	10	0	.375	4th in AFC West	–	–	–	–
SD	1991	4	12	0	.250	5th in AFC West	–	–	–	–
SD Total		16	32	0	.333		–	–	–	
Total		38	73	1	.344					

== See also ==
- List of American Football League players
