= John Henning (journalist) =

American news reporter and political analyst (1937 – 2010)

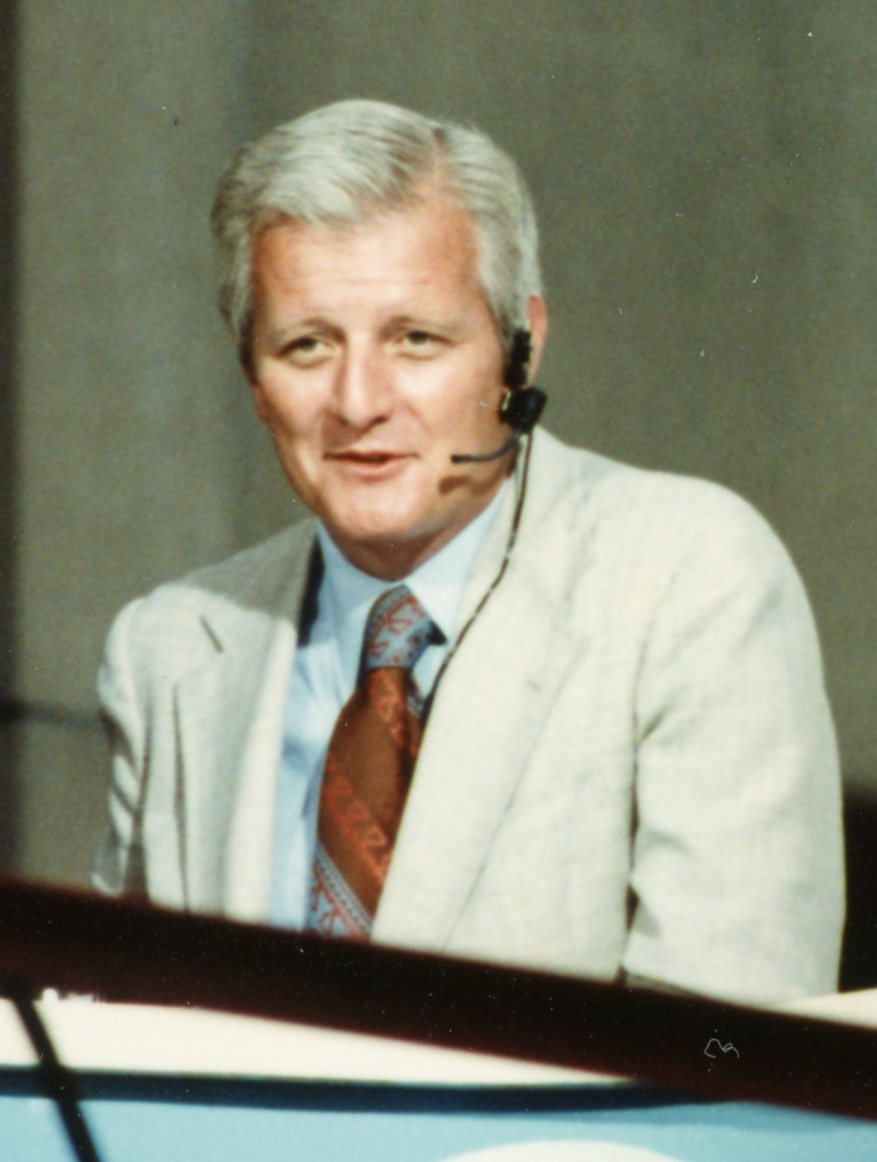
- Born: May 22, 1937; New York City, United States
- Died: July 7, 2010 (aged 73); Boston, Massachusetts, United States
- Education: St. Peter's College; Boston University COM '63
- Occupations: News reporter Political analyst
- Relatives: Dan Henning (brother)

John Henning (May 22, 1937 – July 7, 2010) was an American news reporter and political analyst who spent many years on Boston television before becoming a commentator on radio.

== Biography ==
=== Early life and education ===
Born in New York City, the son of Mary and Walter Henning (his father spent 36 years as a New York City police detective), he was the oldest of six children. His younger brother is veteran college football and NFL coach Dan Henning. Henning graduated from St. Peter's College in Jersey City, New Jersey, and came to Boston in 1959 to get a Master's Degree at Boston University.

=== Career ===
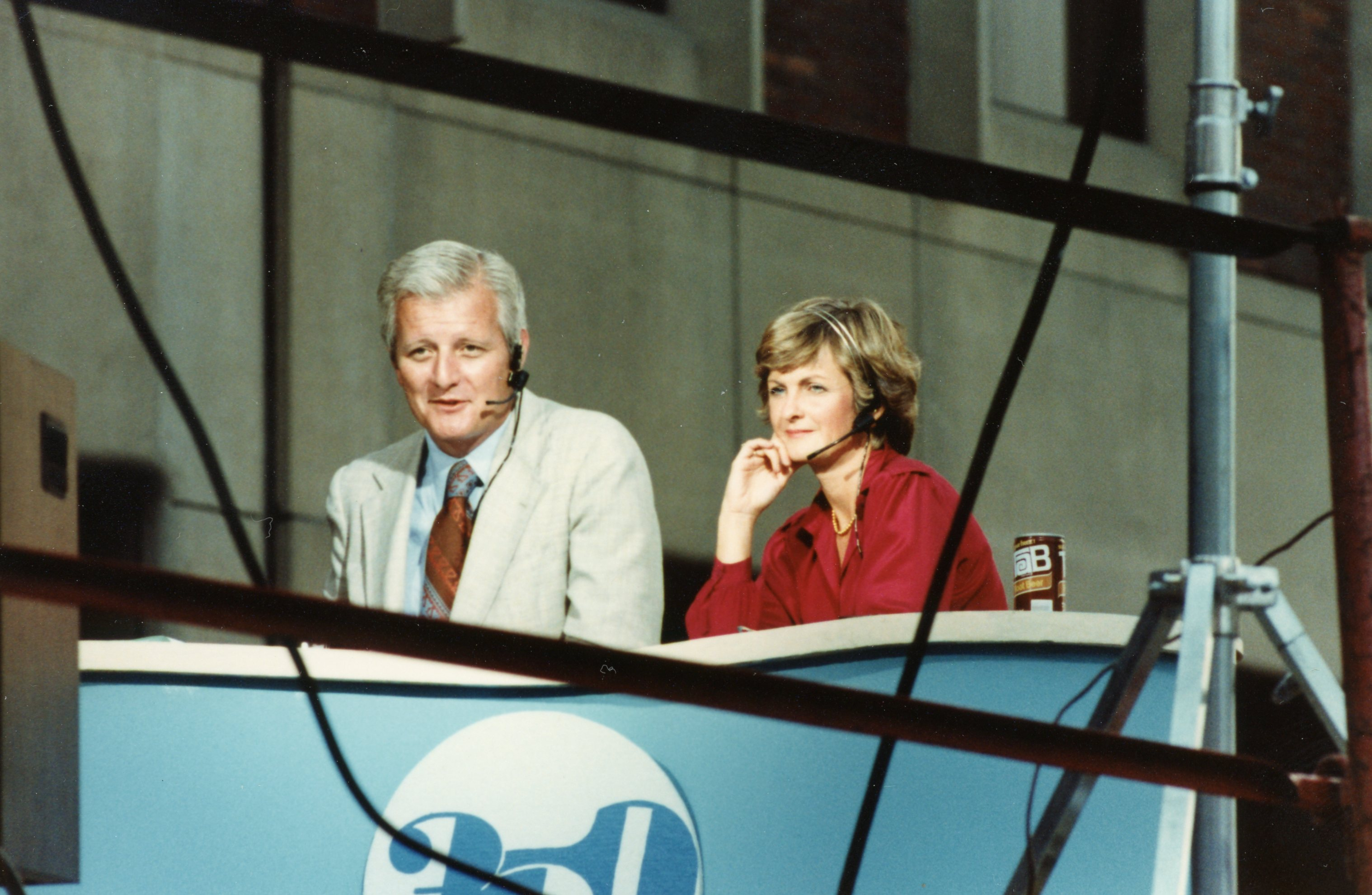
John Henning with co-anchor Mary Richardson covering Boston's Jubilee 350 festivities celebrating Boston's birthday.

While studying, he interned at WGBH-TV (channel 2), where among his duties, he covered sports. But his heart was in news and politics. After two years at WGBH, he spent eight months in the Army. In 1964, he was hired at what was then known as WNAC-TV (now WHDH-TV) as a street reporter. He also began covering local and national elections, something he would become known for. By 1965, WNAC promoted him to news anchor, and he did the 6 pm and 11 pm newscasts. It was during this time that he began to gain the reputation as a dependable, accurate and savvy reporter who knows how to separate spin from fact. Henning left WNAC-TV in 1968, going to work for the old WHDH-TV (now WCVB-TV), Channel 5.

Henning remained at Channel 5 till April 1977, when he returned to the anchor desk at Channel 7. While his reporting continued to win him praise, the ratings at WNAC-TV did not go up, and he was taken off the anchor desk and reassigned to other duties. Not long after that, in late June 1981, he decided to resign. At that time, media critic Robert MacLean of the Boston Globe wrote that "It is acknowledged among his colleagues that Henning, a veteran Boston TV newsman, [is] perhaps one of the best street reporters in the history of Boston TV news..."

Due to a non-compete clause in his contract, he remained off the air till January 1982, at which time he was hired by WBZ-TV (Channel 4) to anchor the noon news. Henning spent the rest of his career working for WBZ, winning a number of awards in the process. In 1994, he was able to report on the success of his brother Dan Henning, who was named the football coach at Boston College.

Meanwhile, after many years of anchoring, John stepped down from anchoring the noon news in May 1995, and WBZ-TV made him their senior correspondent, with a specialty in local and national politics. The veteran reporter also covered the State House. Henning retired from full-time reporting in 2003, but continued to do commentary for WBZ-TV and WBZ Radio, where he teamed up with another political commentator, Jon Keller, to do a feature called "Eye on Politics."

=== Death ===
Henning was diagnosed with myelodysplastic syndrome, a condition in which the bone marrow does not produce enough blood cells, in November 2009. He underwent a bone marrow transplant, but it was unsuccessful. Henning died on July 7, 2010, at Massachusetts General Hospital from leukemia complications at the age of 73.

== Awards ==
- 1999: Dennis Kauff Memorial Lifetime Achievement Award
- 2003: George Heller Memorial Gold Card, American Federation of Television and Radio Artists

== Bibliography ==
- Claffey, Charles E. "Henning Knows the People, the City in Which He Works." Boston Globe, July 21, 1981.
- Powers, Dick. "Channel 4 Revamps Early Morning News Format." Boston Globe, December 17, 1981.
