= Great Blue Hill eruption prank =

April Fools' prank

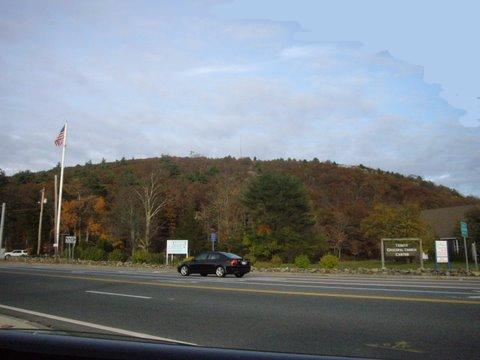
The Great Blue Hill in 2009

On April 1, 1980, the Boston-based television station WNAC-TV aired a fake news bulletin that stated that Great Blue Hill was erupting. Intended as an April Fools' prank, it resulted in panic in Milton, Massachusetts, and the surrounding area. The news bulletin included footage taken from a real eruption of Mount St. Helens, and edited remarks from President Jimmy Carter and Governor Edward J. King.

== News report ==
WNAC-TV ended its 6 pm news broadcast with a bulletin reporting that Great Blue Hill in Milton had erupted and was spraying lava and ash onto nearby homes. The report showed footage of lava flowing down a hillside (taken from the March 27 eruption of Mount St. Helens) and edited remarks from President Jimmy Carter (who expressed concern) and Governor Edward J. King (who called the situation "serious"). According to reporter Jan Harrison, the disaster had been caused by a geological chain reaction set off by the eruption of Mount St. Helens a week earlier. At the end of the bulletin, Harrison held up a card that read "April Fools!".

== Reaction ==
Following the report, some Milton residents began to flee their homes. The Milton Police Department received over a hundred calls from people who believed that the report was true. The Massachusetts Department of Civil Defense was also inundated with calls from residents who wanted to know if they should evacuate their homes.

WNAC-TV received dozens of calls from angry viewers. The station issued an apology during its 11 pm newscast. The next day, the executive producer of the 6 o'clock news, Homer Cilley, was fired by the station for "his failure to exercise good news judgment" and for violating the Federal Communications Commission's rules about showing stock footage without identifying it as such.
