= Abbott Lawrence Rotch =

American meteorologist (1861–1912)

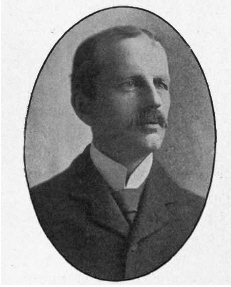
- Born: January 6, 1861; Boston, Massachusetts, US
- Died: April 7, 1912 (aged 51); Boston, Massachusetts, US
- Education: Massachusetts Institute of Technology
- Occupation: Meteorologist
- Known for: Founder of the Blue Hill Meteorological Observatory

Signature
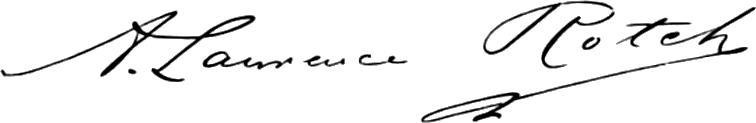

Abbott Lawrence Rotch (January 6, 1861 – April 7, 1912) was an American meteorologist and founder of the Blue Hill Meteorological Observatory, the longest continually operating observation site in the United States and an important site for world climatology.

== Early life ==
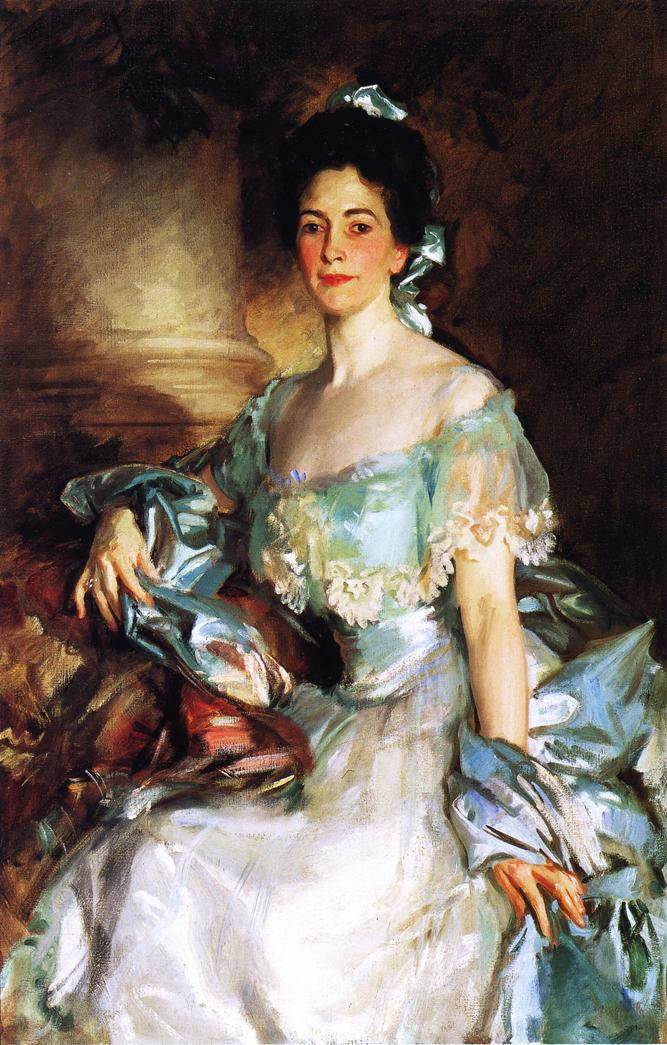
Mrs. Abbott Lawrence Rotch, John Singer Sargent, 1903

Rotch was born on January 6, 1861, in Boston. As a young man, Rotch became interested in the newly developing science of meteorology and determined to make this field his lifetime career. By the time he graduated from the Massachusetts Institute of Technology in 1884, Rotch had conceived and carried into execution his plans for erecting a meteorological observatory on the summit of the Great Blue Hill, ten miles (16 km) south of Boston in the Blue Hills Reservation, a 6,000 acre (24 km^{2}) public park managed by the Metropolitan District Commission of the Commonwealth of Massachusetts in Milton, Massachusetts. Rotch chose the site because the elevation of 635 feet (194 m) was the highest point within ten miles (16 km) of the Atlantic Ocean anywhere on the East Coast south of central Maine. His purpose was to establish an institution free from official control where investigations might be independent of prescribed duties and requirements. Since Rotch was independently wealthy, he carried out his plan using his own funds. The observatory building was completed by the end of 1884 and the first regular observations were begun on February 1, 1885. Construction of the observatory was started by Rotch in 1884 using his own private funds.

== Studies ==
Rotch at the Fourth Conference International Union for Cooperation in Solar Research at Mount Wilson Observatory, 1910

In 1885, Rotch was able to obtain basic data on the heights and movements of various clouds by means of triangulation measurements. In 1894, Rotch became the first in the world to sound the atmosphere by lifting instruments on kites. Ultimately kites sounded the atmosphere to an altitude of 5 kilometers and provided Rotch with information concerning fundamental upper air patterns of wind, temperature, and humidity, as well as their relationship to surface weather patterns. In 1904, at the St. Louis World's Fair, Rotch initiated the use of sounding balloons in the U.S. These balloons carried recording instruments beyond even the highest clouds to a height of 17 kilometers. Rotch and Leon Teisserenc de Bort, discoverer of the stratosphere, made extensive upper-air kite measurements from ships in the tropical and sub-tropical North Atlantic. These permitted publication in 1911 of a chart of aerial routes, thus pointing the way to the feasibility of transatlantic air travel aided by air patterns. Rotch became the first director of the observatory and maintained it at his own expense until his death in 1912, when he bequeathed it to Harvard University with an endowment of $50,000.

Under Rotch's leadership, the Blue Hill Meteorological Observatory quickly became famous for its pioneering studies of the upper atmosphere. The study of cloud heights, directions and velocities that Rotch carried out at the Blue Hill Observatory made significant contributions to the knowledge of clouds in the early years of the 20th century. In addition, Rotch was one of the first to suggest the use of daily maps at local Weather Bureau stations to plot the direction of weather patterns.

Rotch was personally known to the leading meteorologists from Europe because he made it a point to attend all of the meetings of the International Meteorological Committee, and on many occasions was the sole American representative. From 1888 to 1891 and again from 1902 to 1906, Rotch served as the first professor of meteorology at Harvard. He attended the Chicago Meteorological Congress of August 1893. During his career, Rotch authored 183 scientific papers and several books on the sciences of meteorology and aeronautics. From 1884 to 1895, he served as the associate editor of the American Meteorological Journal. Rotch continued to work at the Blue Hill Observatory until his death on April 7, 1912, from a ruptured appendix. Under the terms of his will, the observatory was given to Harvard with an endowment of $50,000 for operating costs. Harvard operated the observatory until 1971 when it disassociated itself from the site. The Rotch endowment was kept by Harvard.

== Other accomplishments ==
Rotch was elected to the American Academy of Arts and Sciences in 1888. He ballooned above Paris, France in 1889. The French government gave him the distinction of Chevalier de la Légion d'honneur. He was awarded an honorary master's degree by Harvard in 1891. He was elected a member of the American Antiquarian Society in 1899. During his life, he ascended Mont Blanc six times, reaching the summit three times. His book published in September 1909, The Conquest of Air, went through three printings in one year. He co-authored a book titled Charts of the Atmosphere for Aeronauts and Aviators 1st Edition in 1911. That same year, he was elected to the American Philosophical Society. He published Sounding of the Ocean of Air, a popular work, in 1900, and also did experiments in wireless telegraphy.
