= Blue Hills Ski Area =

Ski area in Canton, Massachusetts

Blue Hills

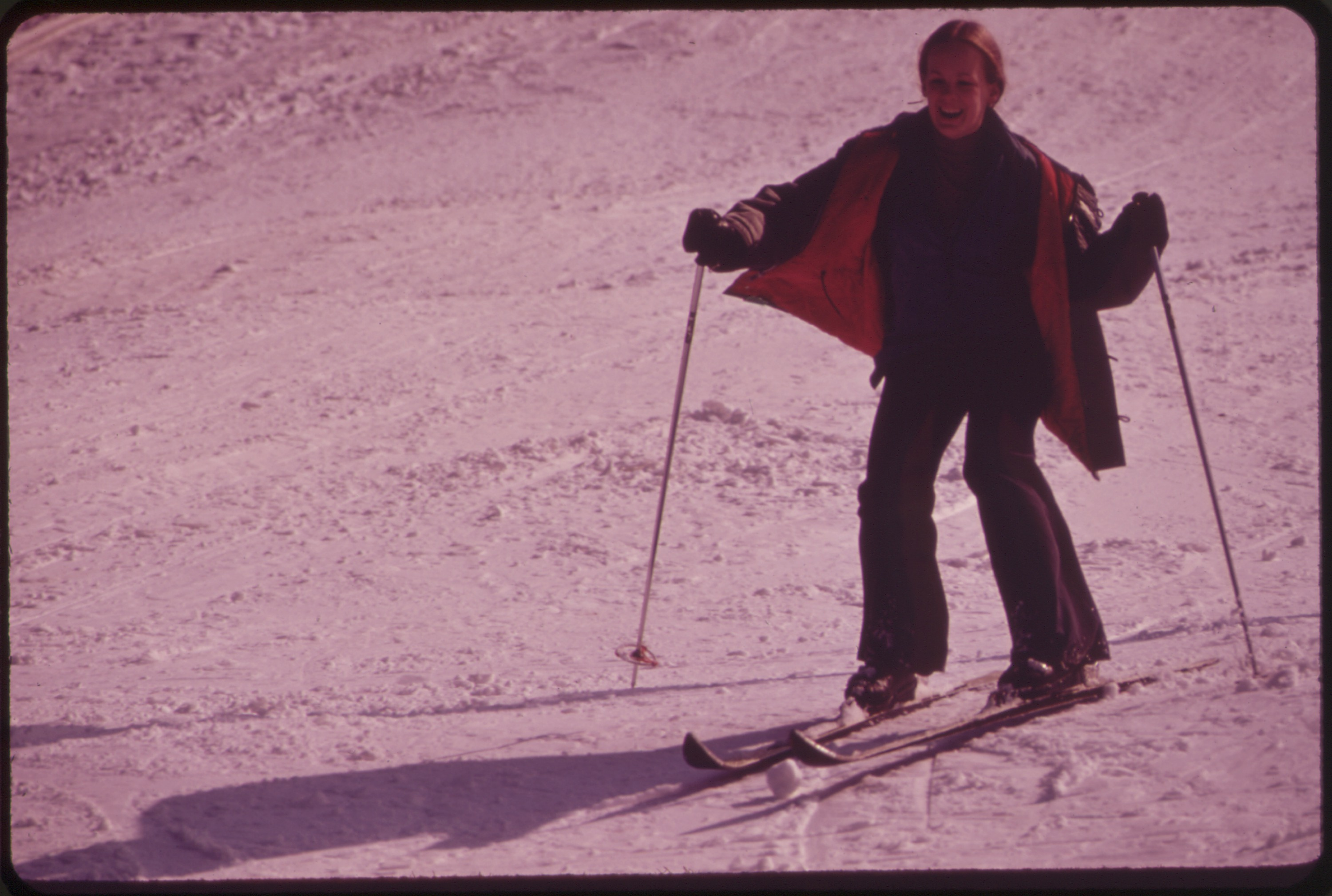
- Interactive map of Blue Hills
- Location: Canton, MA
- Nearest city: Boston
- Coordinates: 42°12′55″N 71°07′09″W
- Vertical: 309 ft (94 m)
- Skiable area: 60 acres (240,000 m^{2})
- Trails: 8
- Longest run: Patriots
- Website: Blue Hills Ski Area

Blue Hills Ski Area is located on the western face of Great Blue Hill in Canton, Massachusetts. This land is part of the Blue Hills Reservation, a state park managed by the Massachusetts Department of Conservation and Recreation.

Blue Hills has eight trails covering a vertical drop of 309 feet (94 m). The summit is served by a double chairlift, while the beginner area has three magic carpet lifts.

The hill is popular with high school ski teams and often hosts races on Big Blue.

Generally, the Ski Area opens in December and closes in March.

== History ==
The ski area was founded in 1949 after the Metropolitan District Commission received $65,000 to develop a ski area on Great Blue Hill. It officially opened in 1950.

In the early 1960s, the Metropolitan District Commission (MDC, now the DCR) operated the ski area. There were only two lifts – both rope tows – one on the main slope and one on the bunny slope. During that time, the lift tickets costed fifty cents a day. In approximately 1965, the area was leased to an outside company called Larchmont Engineering, which constructed a double chair lift and installed snow-making equipment on the main slope and the bunny slope. Larchmont was an early innovator in the snow-making business and experimented with various hose and gun/nozzle designs at Blue Hills.

In February 1969, the area was hit with three 2+ foot snow storms, each a week apart. The snow was so deep that skiing down the "face" of Big Blue (the side facing Massachusetts Route 128) was possible.

The 2006–07 season was the 6th year of a 6-year "lease" to the owners and operators of Ragged Mountain Resort in New Hampshire.

In 2007, the management of Campgaw Mountain, located in northern New Jersey, started a 5-year lease.

Currently, there is one double chairlift leading to the peak and 3 beginner magic carpets.

== Operations ==
There are 12 trails: 6 green, 5 blue and 4 black.

There are four top to bottom lines, with the rest being connectors.

While the lift line ("Beer's Bluff", which is named after two brothers, Stuart and Stanley Beers, who managed the ski area from the late 1960s through the mid-1980s) is listed on the trail map, it is currently not maintained for skiing.
