= Blue Hill Meteorological Observatory =

Building in Milton, Massachusetts

- Blue Hill Observatory and Science Center
- U.S. National Register of Historic Places
- U.S. National Historic Landmark
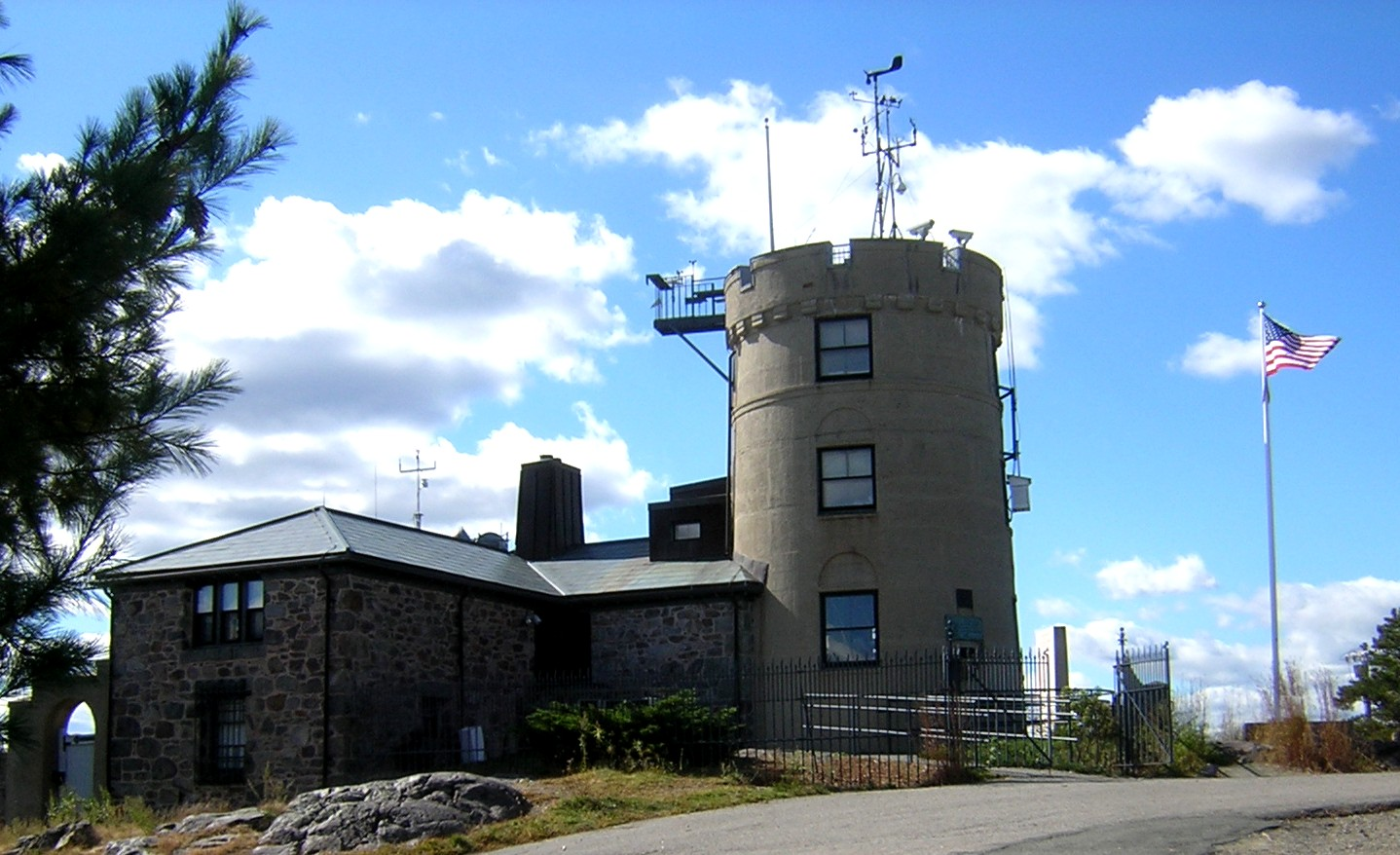
- View from the east

- Location within Massachusetts Location within the United States
- Location: Blue Hills Reservation, Milton, Massachusetts
- Coordinates: 42°12′43″N 71°6′51″W
- Built: 1885
- Architect: Arthur Rotch; George T. Tilden
- Architectural style: Late Gothic Revival
- Website: www.bluehill.org
- MPS: Blue Hills and Neponset River Reservations MRA
- NRHP reference No.: 80000665

Significant dates
- Added to NRHP: September 25, 1980
- Designated NHL: December 20, 1989

The Blue Hill Meteorological Observatory in Milton, Massachusetts is the foremost structure associated with the history of weather observations in the United States. Located atop Great Blue Hill about 10 miles south of Boston, Massachusetts, it is home to the oldest continuous weather record in North America, and was the location of the earliest kite soundings of the atmosphere in North America in the 1890s, as well as the development of the radiosonde in the 1930s.

Founded by Abbott Lawrence Rotch in 1884, the observatory took a leading role in the newly emerging science of meteorology and was the scene of many of the first scientific measurements of upper atmosphere weather conditions, using kites to carry weather instruments aloft. Knowledge of wind velocities, air temperature and relative humidity at various levels came into use as vital elements in weather prediction due to techniques developed at this site. By 1895 the observatory was the source of weather forecasts of remarkable accuracy. On August 4, 1894 the first atmospheric sounding in the world was accomplished at the observatory, with a weather kite carrying a thermograph 2,030 feet above sea level. On October 8, 1896, a record of 8740 feet (2,665 m) was achieved for a weather kite. During the Great New England Hurricane of 1938, the observatory measured the strongest wind gust ever directly measured and recorded in a hurricane at 186 mph (299 km/h).

The observatory remains active to this day, continuing to add to its database of weather observations now more than one hundred years old, and stands as a monument to the science of meteorology in the United States.

== History ==
=== Site ===
The Blue Hill Meteorological Observatory was founded by American meteorologist Abbott Lawrence Rotch in 1885. By the time he graduated from the Massachusetts Institute of Technology in 1884, Rotch had conceived and carried into execution his plans for the erection of a meteorological observatory on the summit of Great Blue Hill, ten miles south of Boston, Massachusetts in the Blue Hills Reservation, a 7,000-acre (24 km²) public park managed by the Massachusetts Department of Conservation and Recreation. Rotch chose the site because the elevation of 635 feet was the highest point within ten miles of the Atlantic Ocean, on the East Coast south of central Maine. The Observatory was founded as a weather station and research facility. This location afforded early weather scientists a unique opportunity for recording extremes of weather and experimenting with weather-recording instruments.

The observatory building was completed by the end of 1884 and the first regular observations were begun on February 1, 1885. Rotch became the first director of the observatory and maintained it at his own expense until his death in 1912 when he bequeathed it to Harvard University with an endowment of $50,000, which grew to $111,000 in the twelve years after his death.

=== The building ===
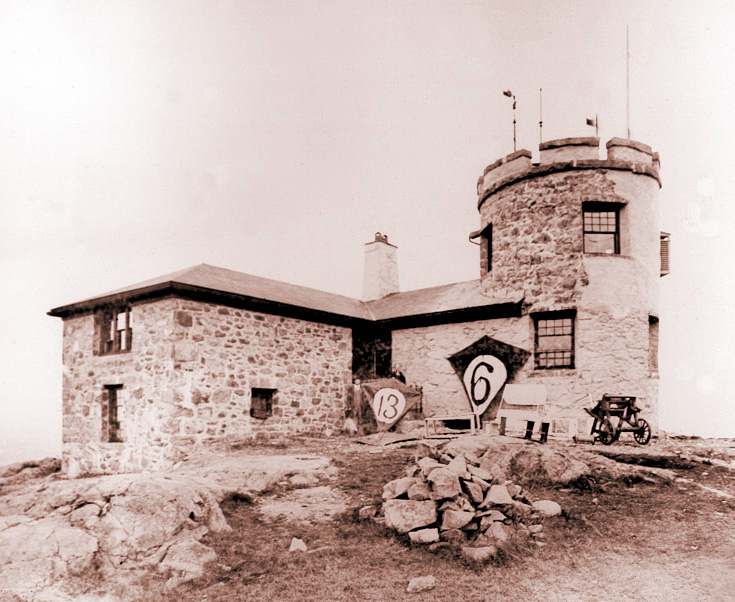
View of the observatory in 1897

Construction of the observatory was started by Rotch in 1884 using his own private funds, and designed by architects Rotch & Tilden. The original structure consisted of a two-story circular tower and an adjoining housing unit which contained two bedrooms, a dining room and a kitchen. In 1889, a two-story east wing was added to provide additional working space for research, domestic chores, and the library.

In 1902, a two-story west wing containing a new library was added to provide additional work space. A steel fire door and brick wall connect the library to the earlier masonry structure. A timbrel vault (18 by 35 ft) of cohesive tiles spans the library. The timbrel vault tile roof is believed to have been installed by the Guastavino Company using an extremely tenacious mortar developed by Rafael Guastavino, the founder of the firm.

Native stone, gathered from the summit of the Great Blue Hill, was used for the two-story tower, adjoining housing unit, and the east and west wings. Copper sheathing was used for roofing. A stone wall and iron fence were erected in 1905 to provide security for the building and instruments and privacy for the staff. The original stone tower eventually proved to be unsuitable. Wind-driven rain penetrated its walls, damaging the instruments and records. Vibration from the instruments on masts atop the tower contributed to the structural problems.

In 1908, the original tower was demolished and a new reinforced three-story late Gothic Revival concrete tower, 20 feet 6 inches wide and 32 feet 8 inches high was constructed in its place. The concrete construction of the tower was chosen specifically to provide the maximum amount of stability and durability in the event of high winds. The tower has a crenelated top and a cornice containing dentils. The windows are double-hung sash with a shallow recessed arch over the windows on the first and second floors.

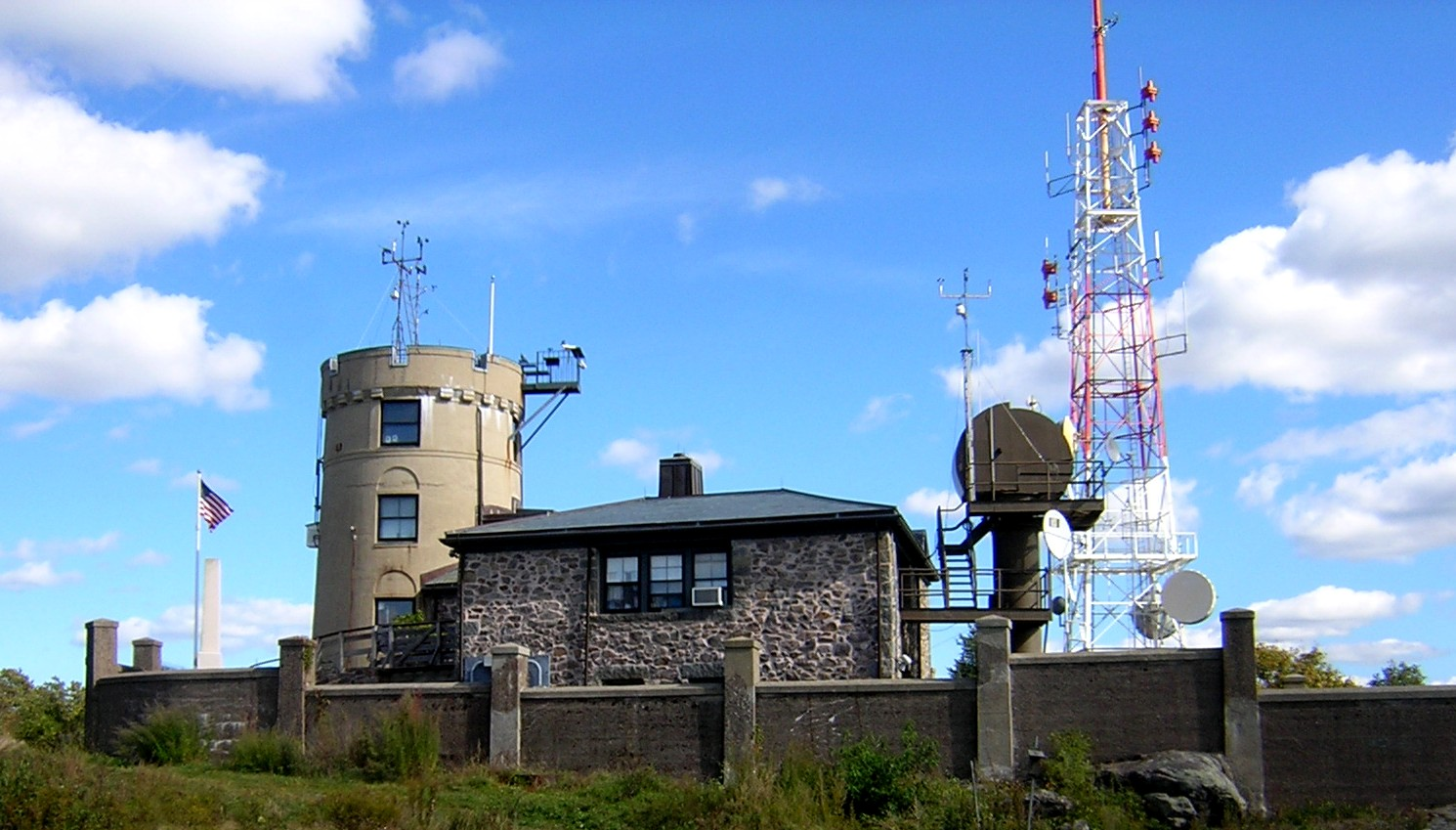
View from the west-northwest

The new tower provided the durable weather-resistant, vibration-free environment necessary for accurate instrument readings. The first floor of the tower contains the director's office. The weather bureau is on the second floor and a laboratory and access to the roof are found on the third floor. Various wind gauges and other meteorological recording instruments are attached to the roof of the tower. The observatory still retains barometers and other instrumentation dating from the late 19th century. These instruments are used to calibrate the modern instrumentation to preserve the accuracy and integrity of the data base dating back to 1885.

In 1962, a metal tower containing a siderostat for collecting the sun's rays and directing them by mirrors to an optical bench inside the observatory, was erected adjacent to the west wing for studies related to the upper atmosphere. This project was abandoned after a few years. This tower, with its mirrors still present, is no longer in use.

In 1980, the building was listed in the National Register of Historic Places as "Great Blue Hill Weather Observatory", as part of a multiple property nomination by the Commonwealth of Massachusetts entitled "Prehistoric and Historic Resources of the Blue Hills and Neponset River Reservations and Selected Adjacent Lands".

In 1981, the Metropolitan District Commission transferred responsibility for the observatory to the Blue Hill Weather Club, a local group of supporters, who plan to restore the observatory and establish a weather museum on the site. The observatory will be kept open to continue its record of continuous weather observations. The National Weather Service continues to operate an Automated Surface Observing System at the site.

A white marble stone containing a summary record of climatological data from 1885 to 1984 and dedicated to the memory of Abbott Lawrence Rotch is located on the front yard of the building.

It was declared a National Historic Landmark in 1989 with name "Blue Hill Meteorological Observatory".

In 2021, a major $2 million renovation of the observatory began. Many parts of the building are being upgraded, and the renovations include a new concrete wall, new ceilings, new windows, and increased weatherproofing.

== History of its operations ==
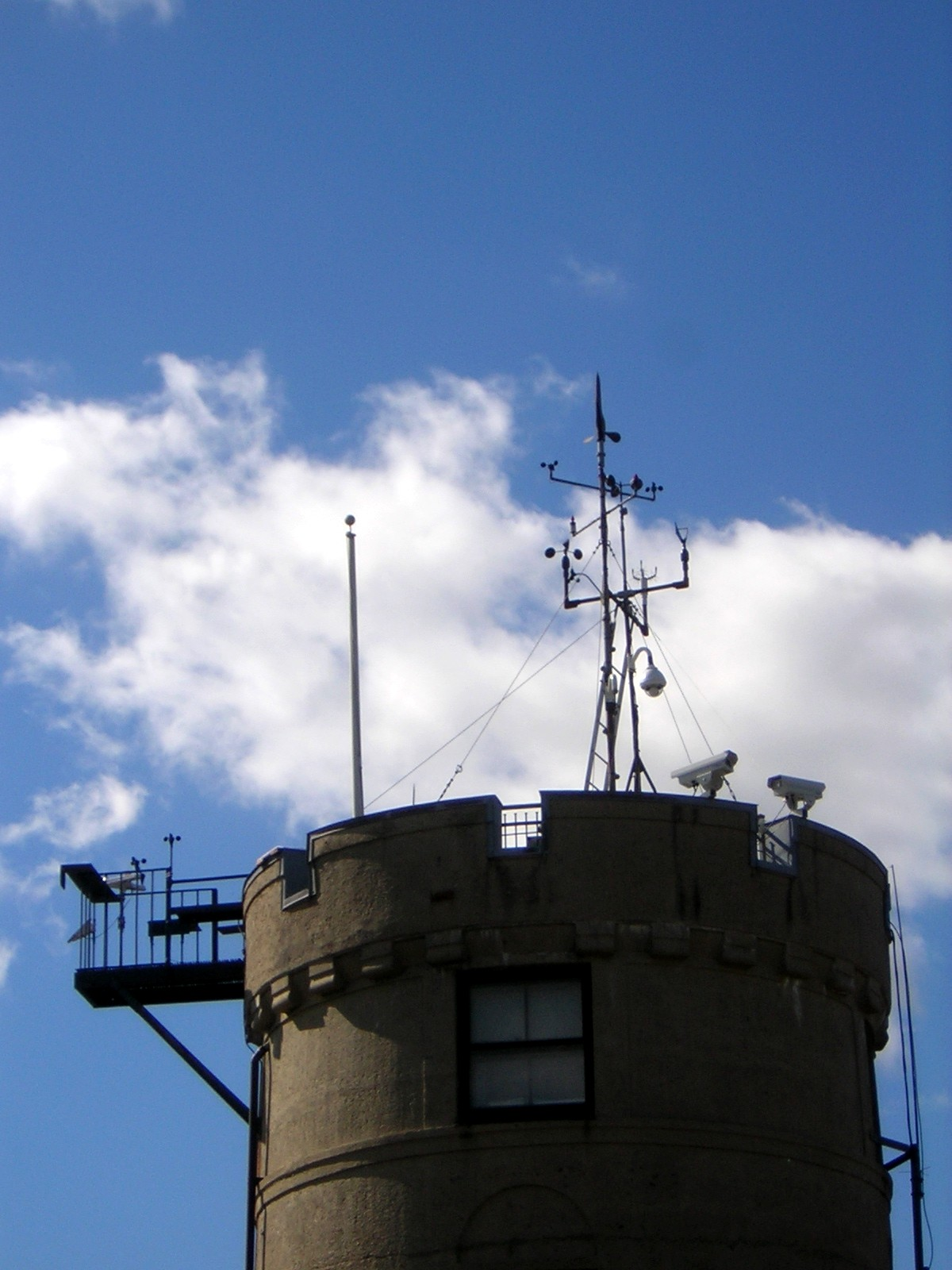

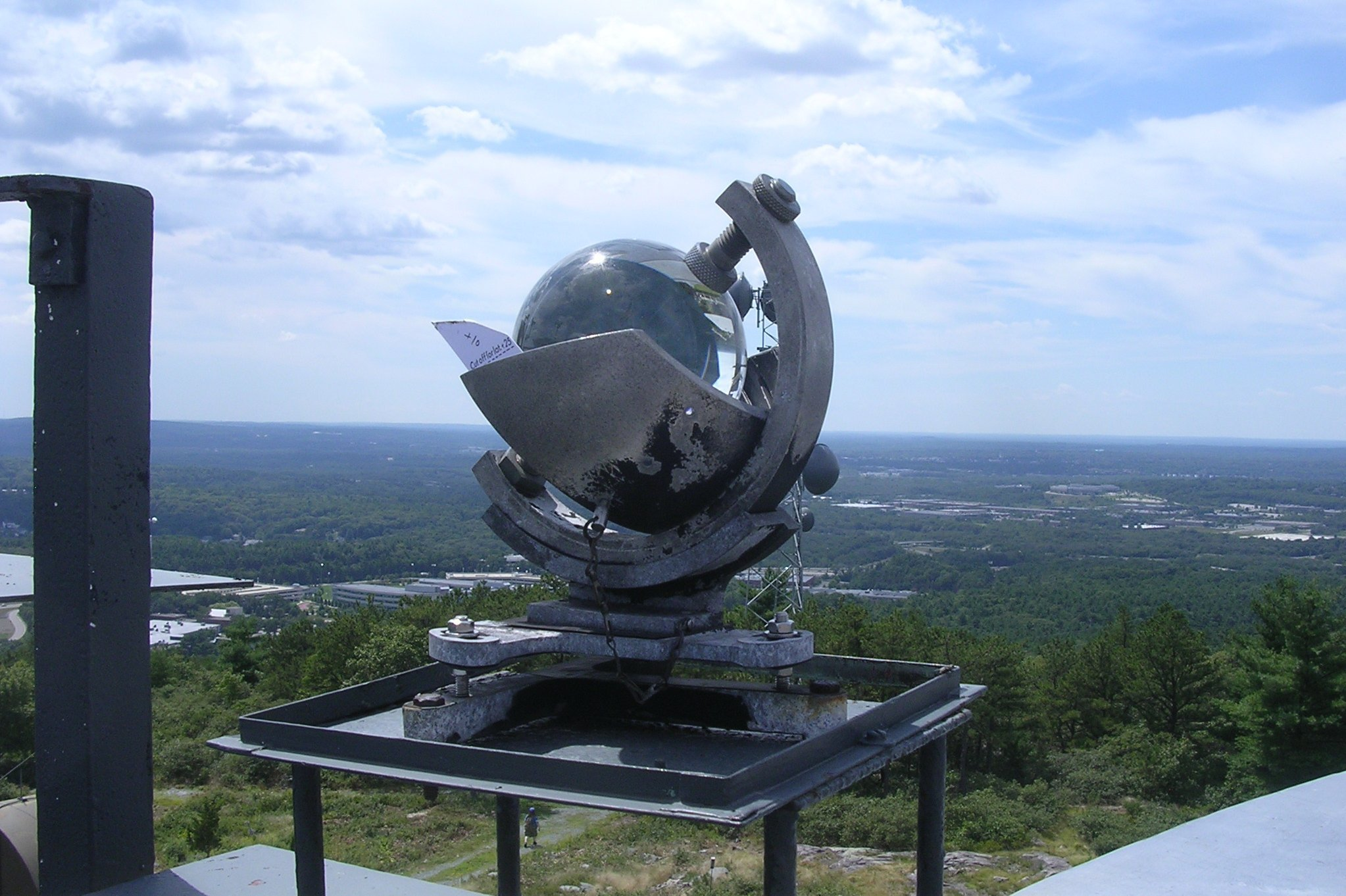
Campbell–Stokes recorder

Under Rotch's leadership, the Blue Hill Meteorological Observatory quickly became famous for its pioneering studies of the upper atmosphere. The study of cloud heights, directions and velocities that Rotch carried out at the Blue Hill Observatory made significant contributions to the knowledge of clouds in the early years of the 20th century.

Rotch continued to work at the Blue Hill Observatory until his death on April 7, 1912. Under the terms of his will, the observatory was given to Harvard University with an endowment of $50,000 for operating costs. Harvard operated the observatory until 1971 when it disassociated itself from the site. The Rotch endowment was kept by Harvard.

After 1912, the Blue Hill Meteorological Observatory continued to operate as an active meteorological observatory. Weather observations and recordings have continued to this day, providing modern meteorologists with a record of uninterrupted climatological observations that is unique in the world.

Since these recordings were obtained from the same site with virtually no environmental change, they provide an important index to climate change. This information is of special importance to students of climatic change, in an age where so many weather records are flawed by environmental and procedural changes, and by repeated moves of the observing site over a number of years. For this reason, the National Oceanic and Atmospheric Administration designated the Blue Hill Observatory one of 26 International Benchmark stations within the United States.The World Meteorological Organization designated BHO&SC as a Centennial Station in 2017.

During the 1950s, the site housed a research group that used radar to scan approaching thunder storms as far away as western New York State, as part of an inquiry into the causes of lightning. Findings by this group were instrumental in the development of the US weather radar program. The installation consisted of a steel tower supporting a second-hand military radar set, several Quonset huts and box trailers, surrounded by a chain-link fence. Group members were on call to monitor the radar whenever severe storms could be observed. Data were also collected from a network of amateur co-operative observers who corresponded by mail. This era coincided with the end of the long career of the famous Director of the Observatory, Dr. Charles Brooks, said to be one of the few who accurately forecast the path of the destructive Hurricane of September, 1938.

== Accomplishments ==
Since 1885, the staff of the observatory and others have documented the scientific work completed at the Blue Hill Observatory in almost 900 scientific publications. The Observatory's first century is a distinguished history of contribution to the development of meteorology. Measurements at the observatory have continued on a daily basis since the day it first opened in 1885, making the observatory one of the oldest continually active weather and climate monitoring stations in the United States.

== See also ==
- List of astronomical observatories
- List of National Historic Landmarks in Massachusetts
- National Register of Historic Places listings in Milton, Massachusetts
