= Signal Hill (Canton, Massachusetts) =

Protected natural area in the U.S. state of Massachusetts

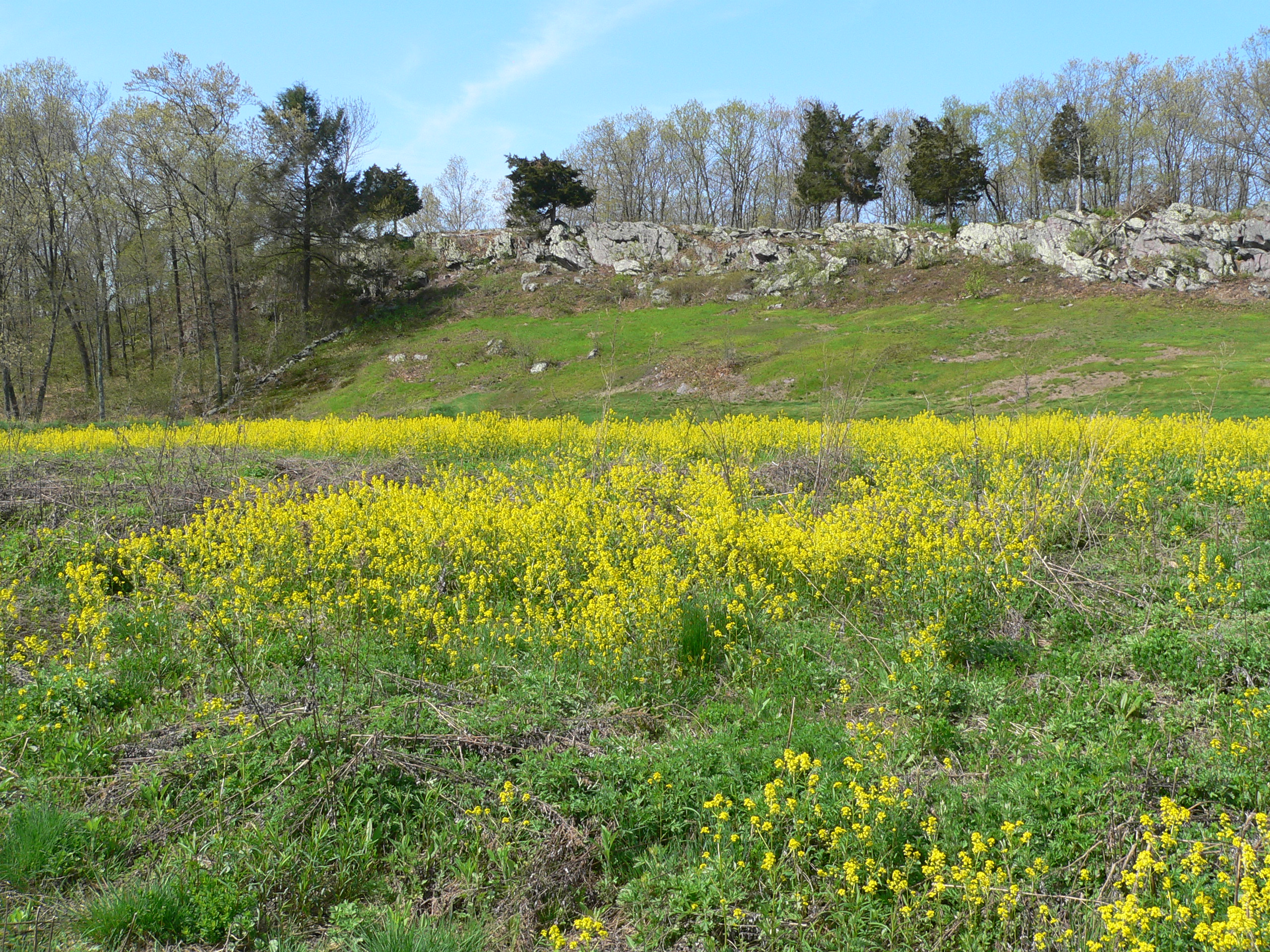
- Signal Hill in Spring
- Interactive map of Signal Hill
- Location: Massachusetts, United States
- Coordinates: 42.185°N 71.159°W
- Established: 2005
- Operator: The Trustees of Reservations
- Website: Signal Hill

Signal Hill is a 150-acre (61 ha) open space preserve located in Canton, in the U.S. state of Massachusetts; it is centered on a 188-foot (57 m) rocky knoll by the same name. The property, acquired in 2005 by the land conservation non-profit organization The Trustees of Reservations, offers frontage on the Neponset River and views of Great Blue Hill and Downtown Boston from open ledges. The Signal Hill preserve also includes wetlands, open fields, and a car-top boating access point.

Signal Hill contains the Wamsutta archaeological site, discovered during construction of Interstate 95, which was a seasonal camp for Paleo-Indians radiocarbon dated by nearby charcoal remains to 12,140 before present, around the time of the last glacial retreat, when rapid melting of the Wisconsin continental glacier created the mile-wide channel through which today's Neponset River flows. At this time, Signal Hill was a peninsula extending into a large lake of glacial meltwater.

It is currently abutted by Interstate 95 as well as industrial and suburban land to the east, and river floodplain to the west. The preserve is open to non-motorized carry-in boating, hiking, picnicking, fishing, and similar pursuits. A trailhead for the 1.3 mile trail system is located on University Road in Canton.

== Gallery ==
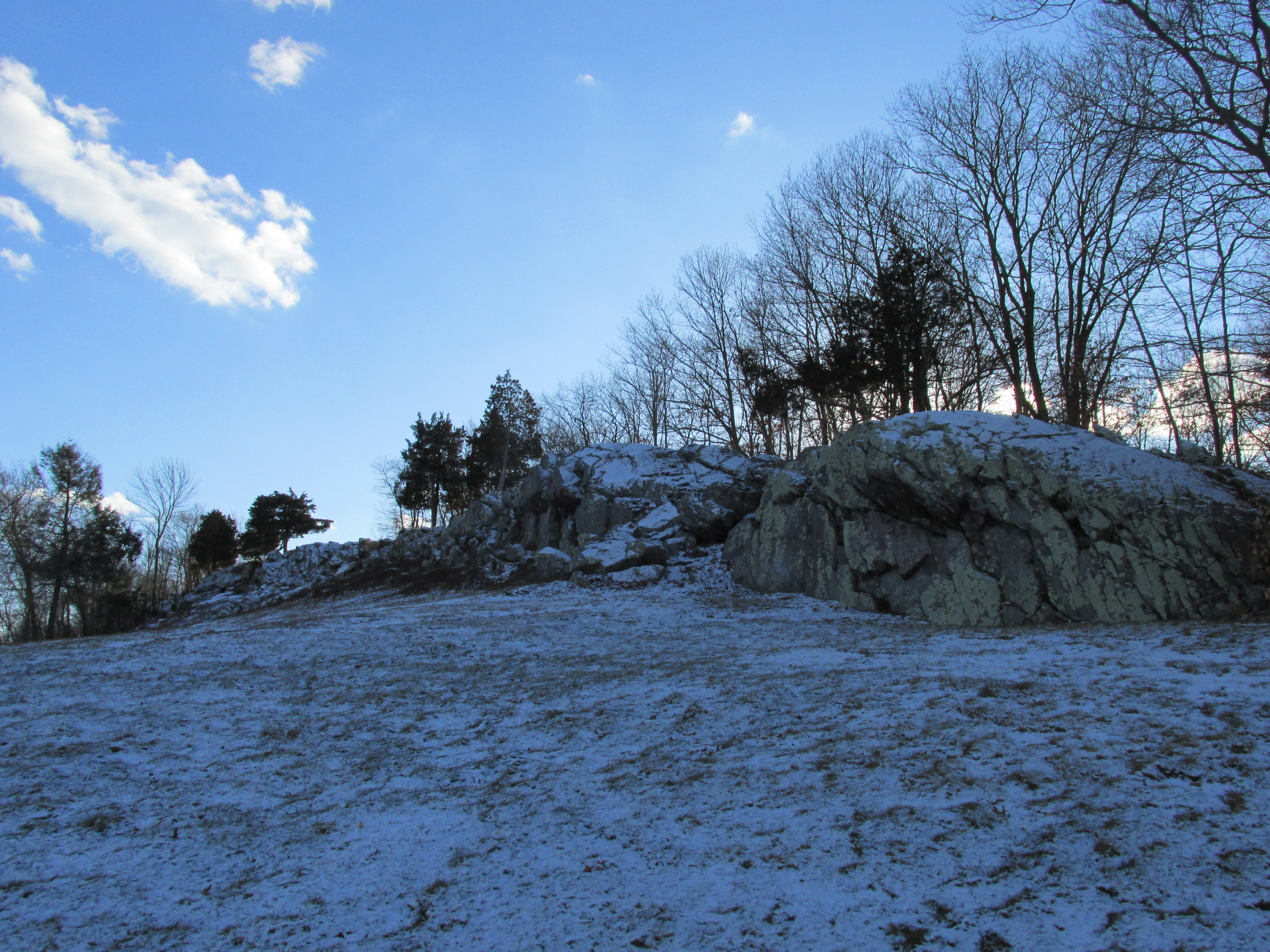
The hill in winter

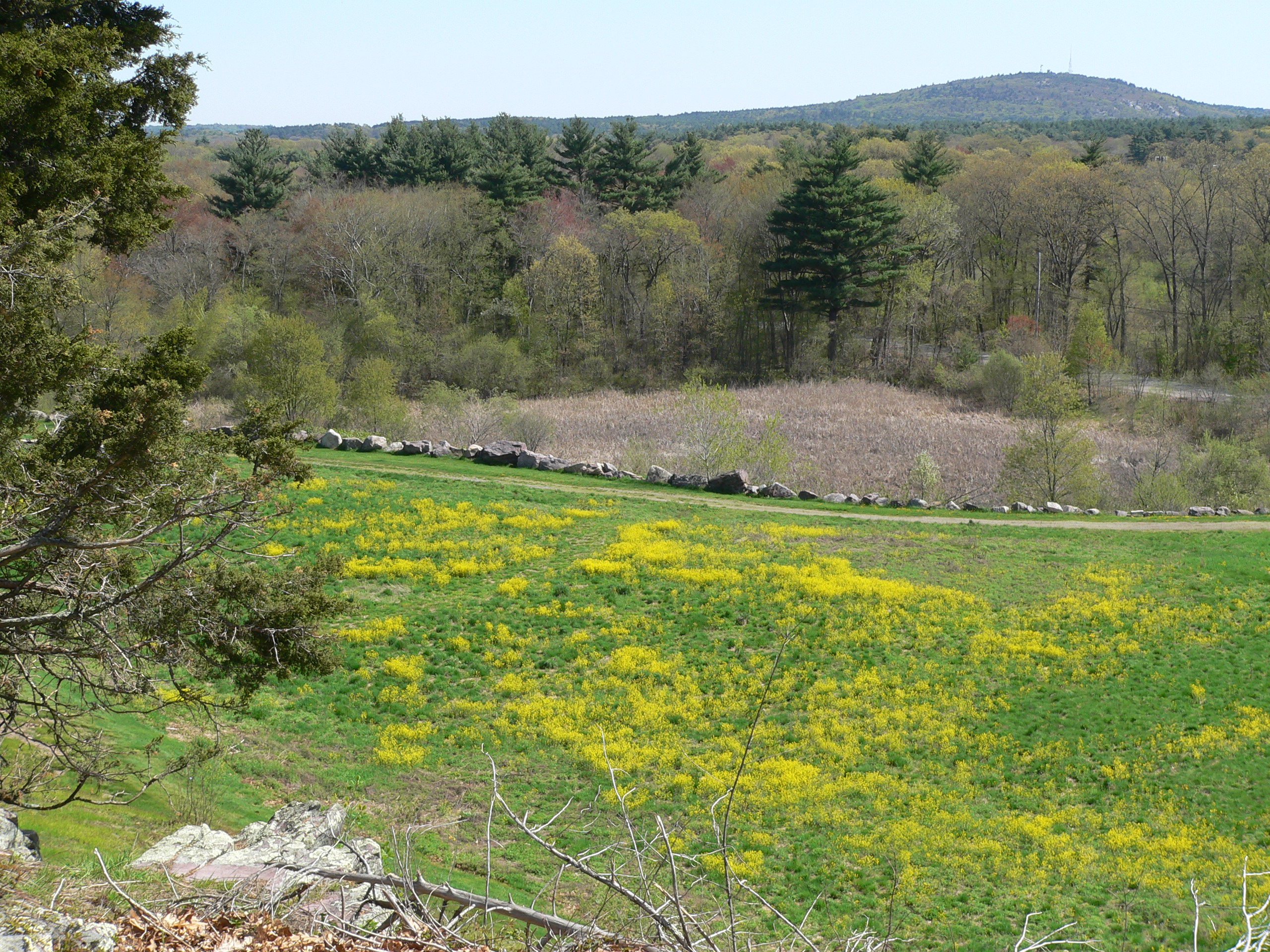
View of Great Blue Hill

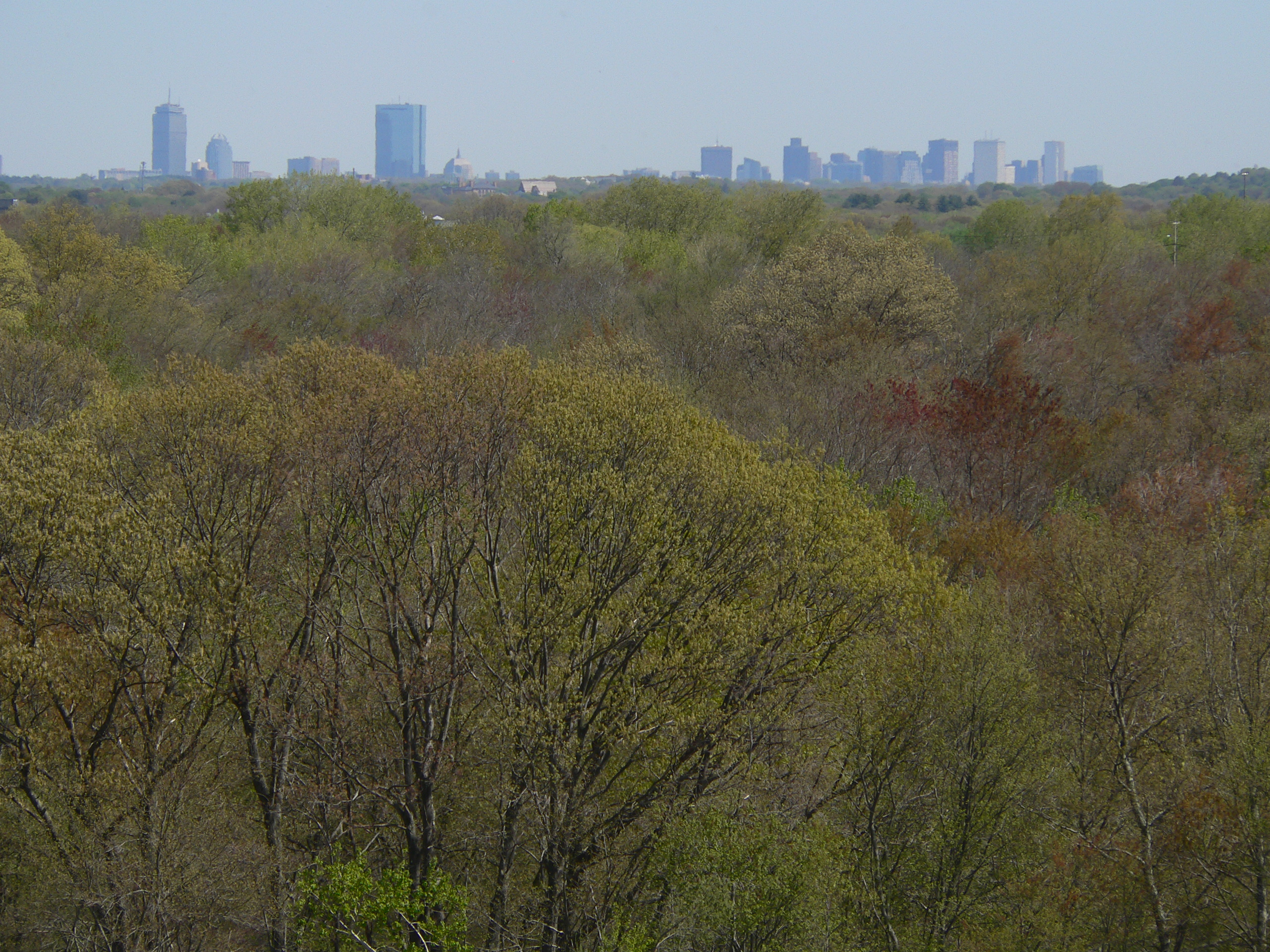
View of Downtown Boston skyline

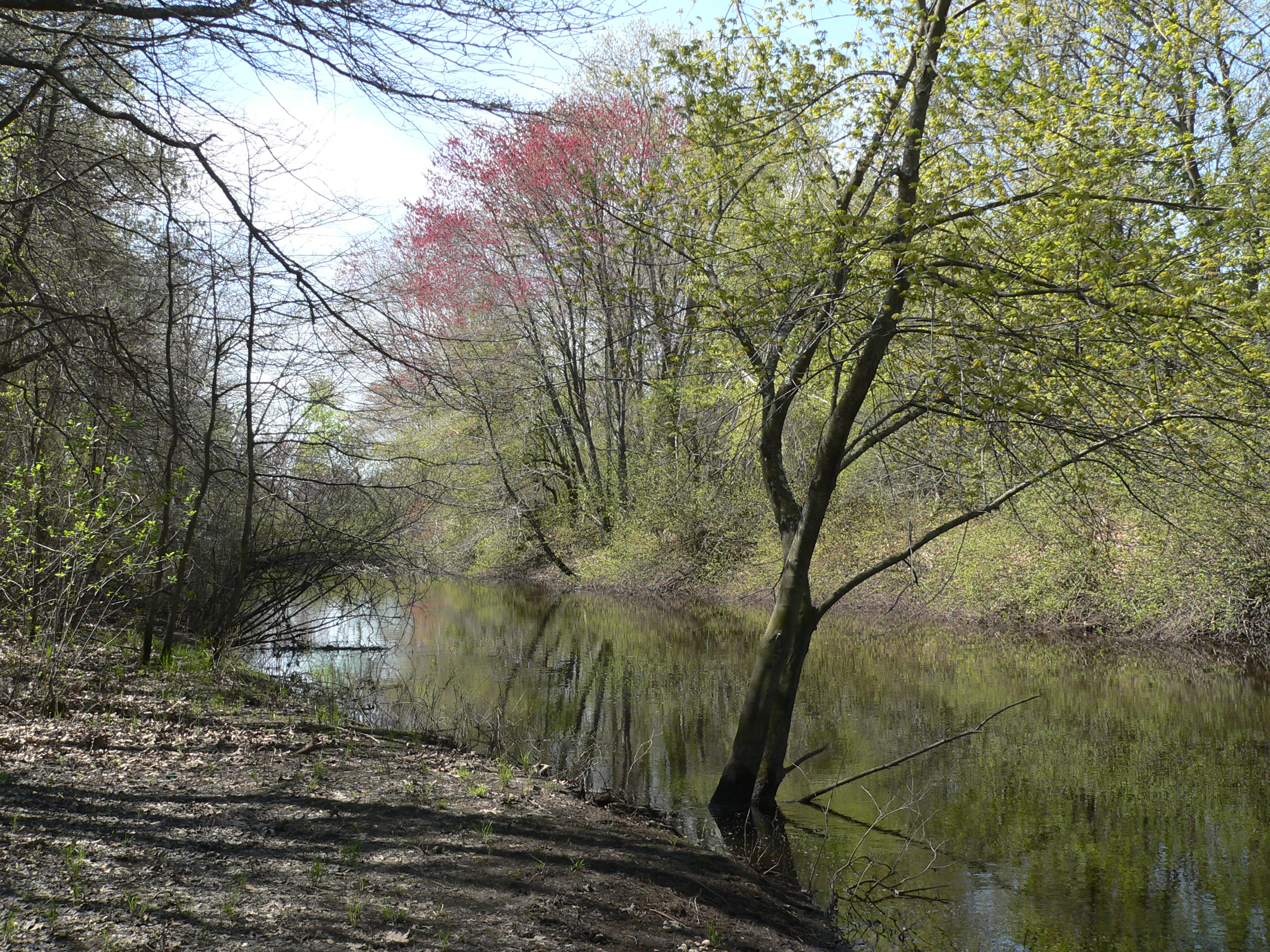
Neponset River
