= Mary B. Newman =

American politician

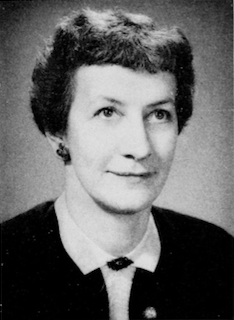

Member of the Massachusetts House of Representatives from the 2nd Middlesex District
- In office 1953–1970
- Preceded by: Walter J. Sullivan (1951–1952)
- Succeeded by: Thomas H. D. Mahoney (1971–1979)

Personal details
- Born: February 15, 1909 Philadelphia, Pennsylvania
- Died: December 6, 1995 (aged 86) Weston, Massachusetts
- Party: Republican
- Spouse: Edwin B. Newman
- Education: Swarthmore College
- Occupation: Politician and state government official

Mary B. Newman (February 15, 1909 – December 6, 1995) was an American politician and state government official who was elected to her first term in the Massachusetts House of Representatives in 1953. A moderate Republican, she represented the 2nd Middlesex District from 1953 to 1954 and, again, from 1957 to 1970. Appointed to the Massachusetts Parole Board in 1955 after her initial legislative term ended, she held that parole board post until 1957 when she returned to the Massachusetts House. During the early part of that second term, she served on the House's Labor and Industries and Water Supply committees.

The first woman to serve in the cabinet of Massachusetts Governor Francis Sargent, Newman was an early champion of the women's liberation movement, and became known as "the fighting Quaker from Cambridge." Upon learning of her death in 1995, Massachusetts Governor William Weld recalled, "Mary Newman, for years the grande dame both of Cambridge and its Republican party, launched me in politics by serving as chair of my statewide campaign in 1978." In 1984, a reporter for The Christian Science Monitor referred to her as "one of the most highly respected forces on the Massachusetts civic scene for almost four decades."

== Formative years ==
Born as Mary B. Temple in Philadelphia, Pennsylvania on February 15, 1909, she was a graduate with honors of Swarthmore College, where she earned a bachelor's degree in Government and Economics. She married Edwin B. Newman in 1935.

A practicing Quaker, she and her husband managed a conscientious objector camp for Quakers in California during World War II. Post-war, she returned to the East Coast and settled in Cambridge, Massachusetts, following her husband's appointment as a professor at Harvard University in 1946. It was during this phase of her life that she became an active member of the League of Women Voters at the city and state levels.

== Political and public service career ==
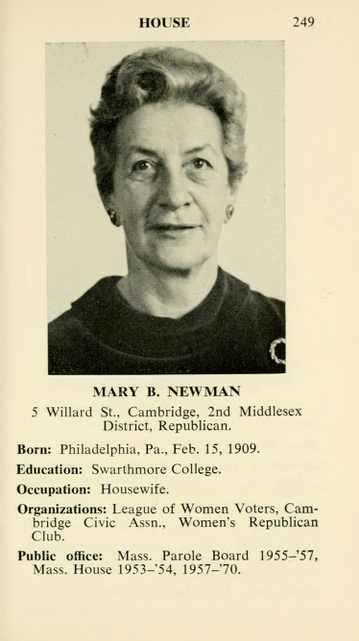
Mary B. Newman, Massachusetts House profile, 1969.

Elected to her first term in the Massachusetts House of Representatives in 1953, Newman was a moderate Republican who represented the 2nd Middlesex District until 1954. According to her obituary in The Boston Globe, "she was 'affirmed' rather than sworn into office by Gov. Paul Dever" for her first term "because the Quaker faith doesn't allow swearing," and "was only the second legislator to be 'affirmed' in Massachusetts."

Subsequently appointed by the governor to the Massachusetts Parole Board, she held that post from 1955 to 1957 when she was reelected to her former seat in the Massachusetts House—a seat she would continue to hold until 1970. During the early 1960s, she served on the House's Labor and Industries and Water Supply committees.

In 1970, she ran for the office of Massachusetts Secretary of the Commonwealth, but was unsuccessful in that election. The only woman to serve in the cabinet of Massachusetts Governor Francis Sargent, she was appointed as the Massachusetts Secretary of Manpower Affairs in 1971, and was an early champion of the women's liberation movement. Interviewed by The Boston Globe in 1972, she noted that government was "one area in which too few women are employed." In addition, she served for a year as a regional director in the administration of U.S. President Gerald Ford.

== Academic career ==
In 1975, Newman was appointed to a position as a visiting professor by the University of Massachusetts Boston, and continued to lecture there into the 1990s, taking time off only for the federal appointment awarded by President Ford.

== Other civic and social activities ==
Newman was active with the following organizations:

- Cambridge Civic Association
- League of Women Voters
- Massachusetts Taxpayers Association, executive member
- Women's Republican Club

In 1994, she was awarded the John Joseph Moakley Award for Distinguished Public Service by the McCormack Institute at the University of Massachusetts. The award was presented "to a dedicated leader who has made significant contributions to the welfare of our state Massachusetts and nation."

== Illness, death, and interment ==
Preceded in death by her husband on December 30, 1989, she was diagnosed with cancer, and died at the age of 86 at the Norumbega Point health care facility in Weston, Massachusetts on December 6, 1995. Her memorial service was held in the Memorial Church of Harvard University in Cambridge at 2 p.m. on December 19.

Party political offices
Preceded by Raymond Trudel	Republican nominee for Secretary of the Commonwealth of Massachusetts; 1970	Succeeded by John M. Quinlan
