= Stephen Guptill =

American journalist

Massachusetts Secretary of Elder Affairs
- In office January 4, 1979 – January 10, 1979
- Preceded by: James H. Callahan
- Succeeded by: Thomas H. D. Mahoney

Personal details
- Born: 1944 or 1945 (age 81–82)
- Occupation: Journalist; Elderly Advocate

Stephen Gardner Guptill is a former American journalist and elderly advocate who resigned as Massachusetts Secretary of Elder Affairs after less than one week on the job when it was revealed that he falsely claimed to have had graduated from two foreign colleges.

== Early life ==
A native of Lynn, Massachusetts, Guptill was the youngest of six children. Guptill's first experience with the elderly came from delivering food from his father's luncheonette to elderly people who lived in the neighborhood.

Guptill dropped out of high school and joined the United States Air Force where he earned his high school equivalency diploma.

== Journalism ==
From 1969 to 1971, Guptill ran a newsletter for senior citizens in Central Massachusetts. From 1971 to 1975 he hosted an elderly affairs show on WSMW-TV.

In 1975, Guptill joined WNAC-TV, where he worked as an elderly affairs reporter and hosted the Sunday morning show The Elder American.

== Secretary of Elder Affairs ==
On December 23, 1978, it was announced that Governor-elect Edward J. King would nominate Guptill for the position of Secretary of Elder Affairs. WNAC-TV and Guptill agreed on a deal that would have him do twelve monthly shows, which the station hoped they could syndicate nationally. On January 10, 1979, less than six days after taking office, he resigned after admitting to falsely claiming two degrees (a bachelor's degree from the University of Heidelberg and a master's degree from Cambridge University) on his resume.

== Later life ==
Shortly after his resignation, The Boston Globe reported that Guptill had failed to file a state income tax return for several years and was a defendant in at least seven lawsuits relating to his failure to pay debts.

Despite his dismissal, WNAC-TV chose to honor his contract. However, they decided to film the twelve shows on a weekly basis so his contract would expire sooner. On April 12, 1979, the station fired Guptill.

In 1979, Guptill was accused by WCVB-TV of having violated a federal payola law in 1977 when while guest hosting a WHDH radio show, he urged the elderly to move to the Woodbriar Cape Cod, a housing development that was paying him $250 a week.

On May 16, 1980, Guptill was convicted of failing to file state income tax returns and fined $1,000 and ordered to pay back taxes, interest, and penalties totaling $1,317.
