= Thomas H. D. Mahoney =

American politician

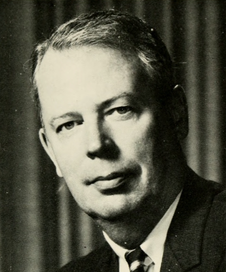

Massachusetts Secretary of Elder Affairs
- In office 1979–1983
- Preceded by: Stephen Guptill
- Succeeded by: Richard H. Rowland

Member of the Massachusetts House of Representatives from the 2nd Middlesex District
- In office 1971–1979
- Preceded by: Mary B. Newman
- Succeeded by: Walter Bickford

Personal details
- Born: November 4, 1913 Cambridge, Massachusetts
- Died: April 21, 1997 (aged 83) Palo Alto, California
- Party: Democratic
- Children: 5
- Education: Boston College; George Washington University; Harvard University
- Occupation: Professor; Politician; Social Gerontologist

Thomas Henry Donald Mahoney (November 4, 1913, in Cambridge, Massachusetts – April 21, 1997, in Palo Alto, California) was an American professor and politician.

== Academia ==
Mahoney graduated from Boston College in 1936 and earned his master's degree and a Ph.D. at George Washington University. In 1945 he joined the faculty at the Massachusetts Institute of Technology. A professor of history and political science, Mahoney twice served as chairman of the history section.

Mahoney wrote and edited several books, including The United States in World History (co-written with J. B. Rae) and a number of works on the life and thought of philosopher and statesman Edmund Burke.

Mahoney retired from M.I.T. in 1984. In 1989, at the age of 75, he earned a second doctorate degree in public affairs at Harvard University's John F. Kennedy School of Government.

== Politics ==
In 1948, Mahoney entered politics when he ran for and was elected to the Cambridge, Massachusetts School Committee. He remained on the committee until 1954 when he decided not to run for re-election.

From 1964 to 1972 Mahoney was a member of the Cambridge City Council.

From 1971 to 1979, Mahoney served in the Massachusetts House of Representatives, representing the 2nd Middlesex District. In the House, Mahoney was the founding chairman of the ethics committee and was also chairman of the House Energy Committee.

In 1979 he was appointed by Governor Edward J. King to serve as Massachusetts' Secretary of Elder Affairs. In 1981, he led the Massachusetts delegation at the White House Conference on Aging.

== Later life and death ==
After his tenure as Elder Affairs Secretary, Mahoney worked as a social gerontologist and was an adviser to the United States House of Representatives He was also a part of many United Nations agencies, panels, and conferences. At the time of his death he was a member of the executive committee of the United Nations Nongovernmental Organizations Committee.

In 1997, Mahoney addressed the 97th conference Inter-Parliamentary Union in Seoul, South Korea. On his return trip home he suffered a stroke while stopping over in California. He died on April 21, 1997, at the Stanford Medical Center.
