= Massachusetts House of Representatives' 2nd Middlesex district =

American legislative district

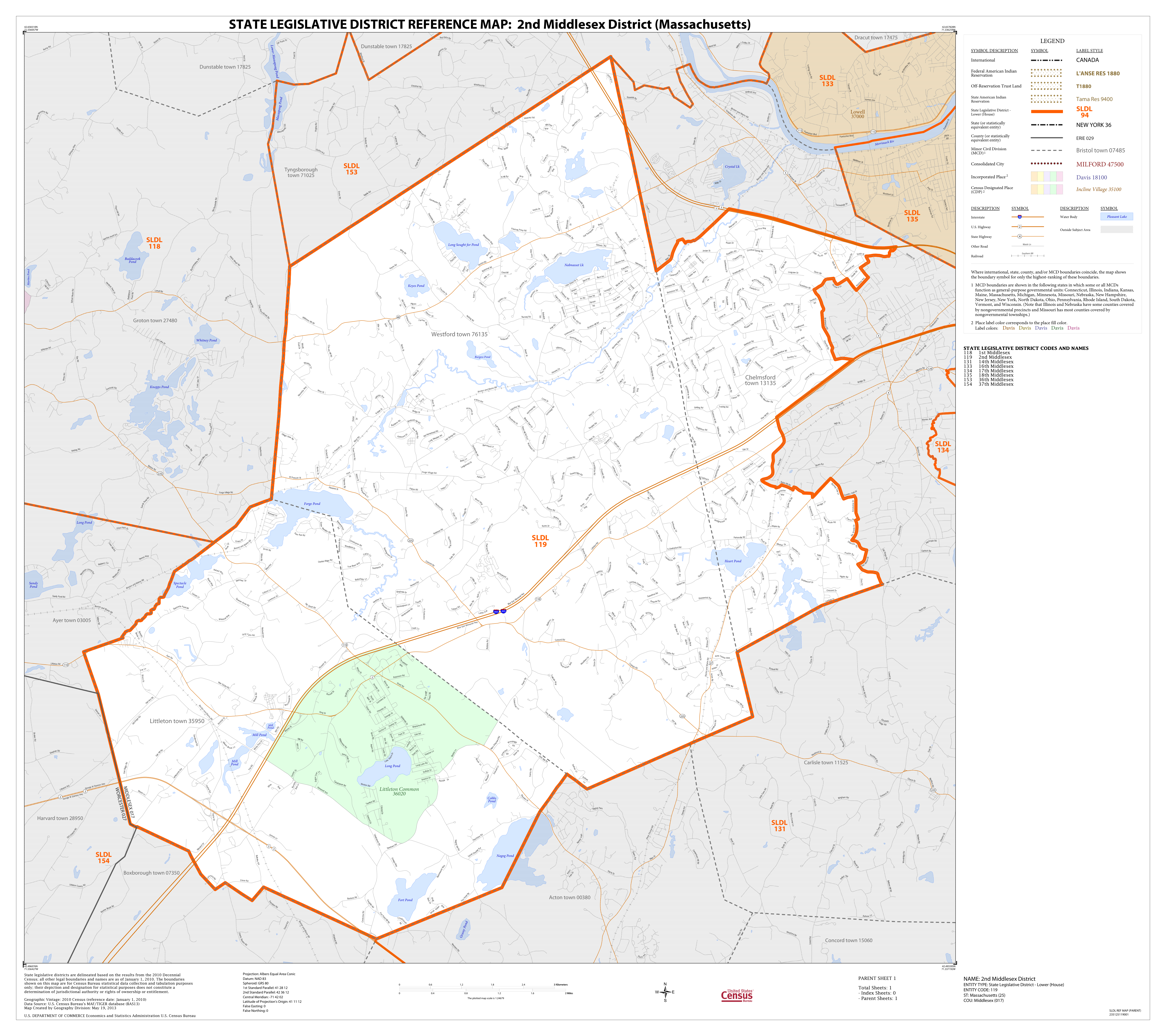
Map of Massachusetts House of Representatives' 2nd Middlesex district, based on the 2010 United States census.

Massachusetts House of Representatives' 2nd Middlesex district in the United States is one of 160 legislative districts included in the lower house of the Massachusetts General Court. It covers part of Middlesex County. Democrat Jim Arciero of Westford has represented the district since 2009.

== Towns represented ==
The district includes the following localities:

- part of Chelmsford
- Littleton
- Westford

The current district geographic boundary overlaps with those of the Massachusetts Senate's 1st Middlesex district, 3rd Middlesex district, and Middlesex and Worcester district.

=== Former locale ===
The district previously covered part of Charlestown, circa 1872.

== Representatives ==
- Joseph Caldwell, circa 1858
- Lyman Pray, circa 1858–1859
- Paul Willard, circa 1858
- James F. Dwinell, circa 1859
- George Close, circa 1888
- John W. Wilkinson, circa 1888
- James E. Curry, circa 1920
- Clarence P. Kidder, circa 1920
- Julius Meyers, circa 1920
- Francis John Good, circa 1951
- Francis W. Lindstrom, circa 1951
- Walter Joseph Sullivan, circa 1951
- Mary B. Newman, 1953–1954 and 1957–1970
- Thomas H. D. Mahoney, circa 1975
- James Arciero, 2009–current

== See also ==
- List of Massachusetts House of Representatives elections
- Other Middlesex County districts of the Massachusetts House of Representatives: 1st, 3rd, 4th, 5th, 6th, 7th, 8th, 9th, 10th, 11th, 12th, 13th, 14th, 15th, 16th, 17th, 18th, 19th, 20th, 21st, 22nd, 23rd, 24th, 25th, 26th, 27th, 28th, 29th, 30th, 31st, 32nd, 33rd, 34th, 35th, 36th, 37th
- List of Massachusetts General Courts
- List of former districts of the Massachusetts House of Representatives

== Images ==
Portraits of legislators

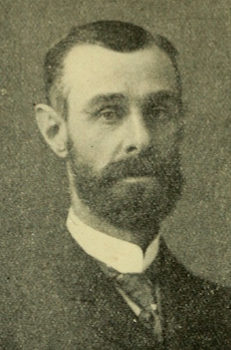
Fred Beunke

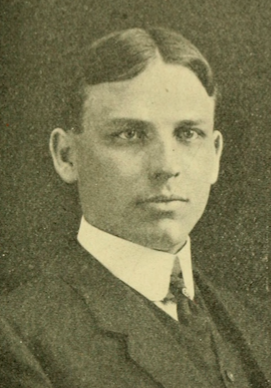
George Giles

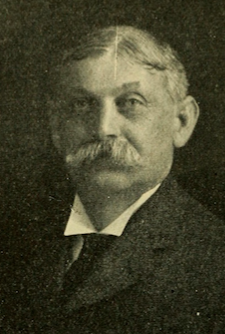
Julius Meyers

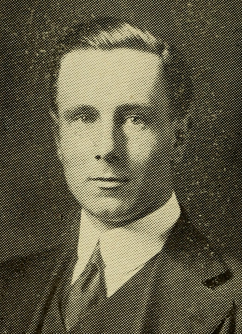
Arthur Stanley Browne

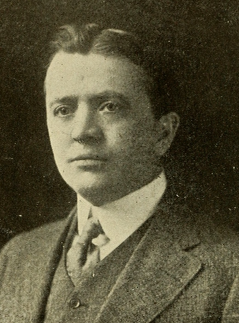
Frederic Clauss

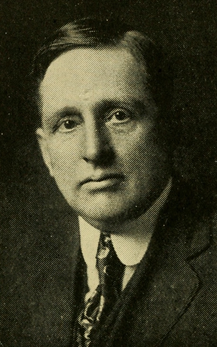
Clarence Kidder

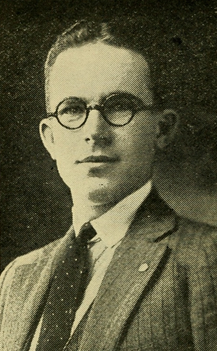
James Bernard Casey

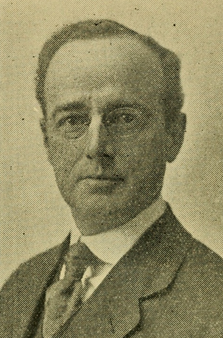
Ralph Raymond Stratton

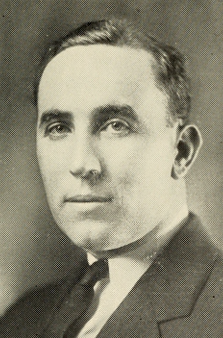
Charles Shea

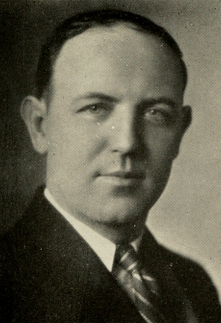
Ralph Hamilton

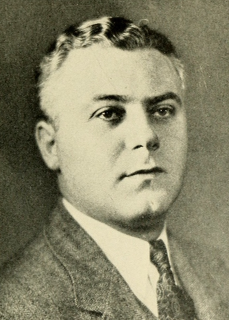
A. John Serino

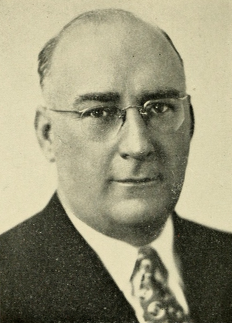
Francis Lindstrom

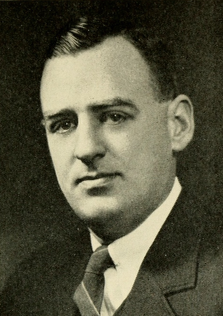
Henry Winslow

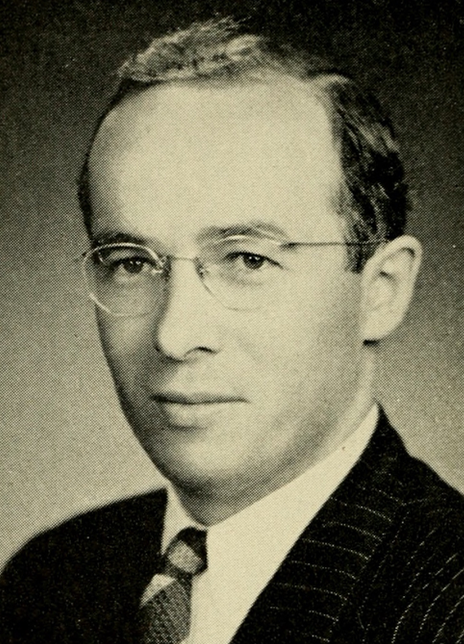
Francis John Good

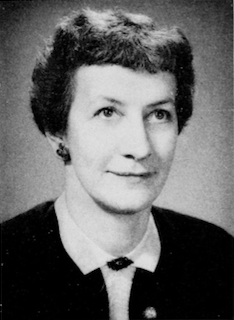
Mary B. Newman

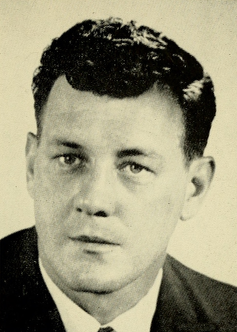
Thomas Doherty

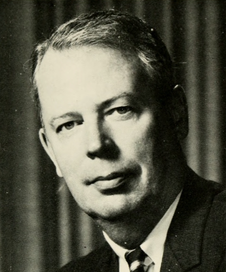
Thomas Mahoney

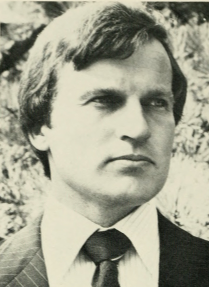
Walter Bickford

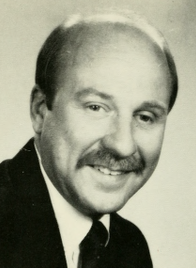
Geoffrey Hall
