= List of mayors and city managers of Cambridge, Massachusetts =

This is a list of the past and present mayors of Cambridge, Massachusetts.

== Mayors ==
No.	Mayor	Image	Term	Party	Notes
1	James D. Green		May 1846 – April 1848		
2	Sidney Willard		April 1848 – April 1851		
3	George Stevens		April 1851 – April 1853		
4	James D. Green		April 1853 – April 1854	None	
5	Abraham Edwards		April 1854 – January 1855		
6	Zebina L. Raymond		January 1855 – January 1856		
7	John Sargent		January 1855 – January 1860		
8	James D. Green		January 1860 – July 24, 1861		
9	Charles Theodore Russell		July 31, 1861 – January 1863		
10	George C. Richardson		January 1863 – January 1864		
11	Zebina L. Raymond		January 1864 – January 1865		
12	J. Warren Merrill		January 1865 – January 1867		
13	Ezra Parmenter		January 1867 – January 1868		
14	Charles H. Saunders		January 1868 – January 1870		
15	Hamlin R. Harding		January 1870 – January 1872		
16	Henry Oscar Houghton		January 1872 – January 1873		
17	Isaac Bradford		January 1873 – January 1877	Democratic	
18	Frank Augustus Allen		January 1877 – January 1878		
19	Samuel L. Montague		January 1878 – January 1880		
20	James Morris Whiton Hall		January 1880 – January 1881		
21	James Augustus Fox		January 1881 – January 1885		
22	William Russell		January 1885 – January 1889	Democratic	
23	Henry Gilmore		January 1889 – January 1891		
24	Alpheus B. Alger		January 1891 – January 1892		
25	William Bancroft		January 1893 – January 1897		
26	Alvin F. Sortwell		January 1897 – January 1899		
27	Edgar R. Champlin		January 1899 – January 1901	Republican	
28	David T. Dickinson		January 1901 – January 1902	Republican	
29	John H. H. McNamee		January 1902 – January 1904		
30	Augustine J. Daly		January 1904 – January 1906		
31	Charles H. Thurston		January 1906 – January 1907		
32	Walter C. Wardwell		January 1907 – April 1909		
33	William F. Brooks		April 1908 – April 1911		
34	J. Edward Barry		April 1911 – April 1914		
35	Timothy W. Good		April 1914 – January 3, 1916		
36	Wendell D. Rockwood		January 3, 1916 – January 1918		
37	Edward W. Quinn		January 1918 – January 1930	Democratic	
38	Richard M. Russell		January 1930 – January 1936	Democratic	
39	John D. Lynch		January 1936 – January 1938		
40	John W. Lyons		January 1938 – July 22, 1941		
41	Francis C. Sennott		July 23, 1941 – January 1, 1942		Last Mayor before the City Manager form of government was established under a Massachusetts Plan E Charter.
42	John H. Corcoran		1942 – December 28, 1945	Democratic	Beginning of the weak Mayor/City Manager form of government
43	John D. Lynch		1946–1947		
44	Michael Neville		1948–1949		
45	Edward Crane		1950–1951		
46	Joseph DeGuglielmo		1952–1953		
47	John J. Foley		1954–1955		
48	Edward J. Sullivan		1956–1957		
49	Tom McNamara		1958–1959		
50	Edward Crane		1960–1965		
51	Daniel Hayes		1966–1967		
52	Walter Sullivan		1968–1969		
53	Alfred Vellucci		1970–1971		
54	Barbara Ackermann		1972–1973		
55	Walter Sullivan		1974–1975		
56	Alfred Vellucci		1976–1977		
57	Thomas Danehy		1978–1979		
58	Francis Duehay		1980–1981		
59	Alfred Vellucci		1982–1983		
60	Leonard J. Russell		1984–1985		
61	Francis Duehay		1985		
62	Walter Sullivan		1986–1987		
63	Alfred Vellucci		1988–1989		
64	Alice Wolf		1990–1991		
65	Kenneth Reeves		1992–1995		
66	Sheila Russell		1996–1997		
67	Francis Duehay		1998–1999		
68	Anthony Galluccio		2000–2001		
69	Michael A. Sullivan		2002–2005		
70	Kenneth Reeves		2006–2007		
71	E. Denise Simmons		2008–2009		
72	David P. Maher		2010–2011		
73	Henrietta Davis		2012–2013		
74	David P. Maher		2014–2015		
75	E. Denise Simmons		2016–2017		
76	Marc C. McGovern		2018–2019		
77	Sumbul Siddiqui		2020–2023		
78	E. Denise Simmons		2024–2025		
79	Sumbul Siddiqui		2026–present		

== City managers ==
No.	City Manager	Term	Notes
1	John B. Atkinson	1942 – 1952	
2	John J. Curry	1952 – 1966	
3	Joseph DeGuglielmo	1966 – 1968	
4	James Sullivan	1968 – 1970	
5	John H. Corcoran	1970 – 1974	
6	James Sullivan	1974 – 1981	
7	Robert W. Healy	1981 – 2013	
8	Richard Rossi	2013 – 2016	
9	Louis A. DePasquale	2016 – 2022	
Acting	Owen O’Riordan	2022 – 2022	
10	Yi-An Huang	2022 – present	
