= Edward W. Quinn =

American politician

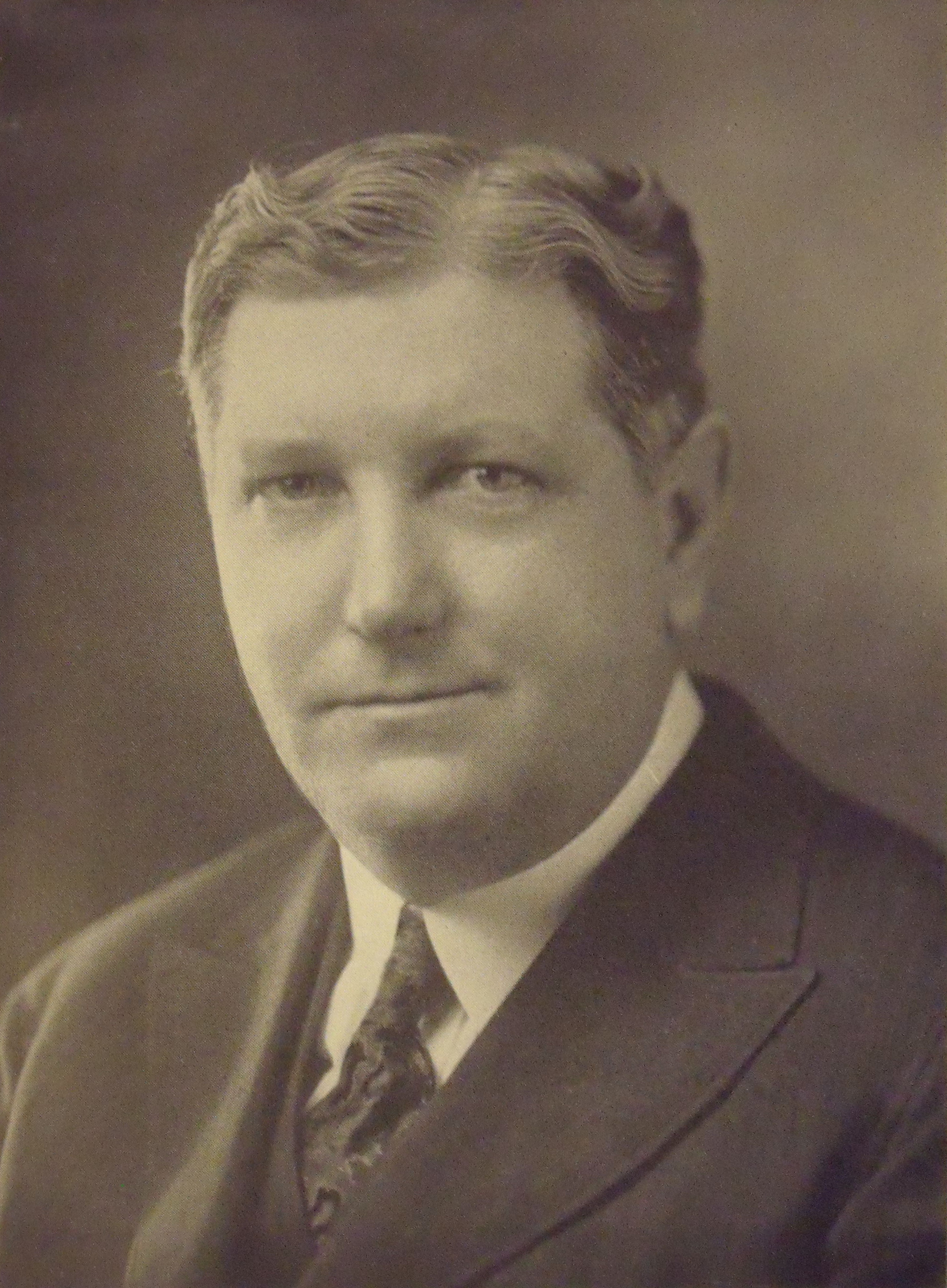
- Mayor Edward W. Quinn

Mayor of Cambridge, Massachusetts
- In office January 1918 – January 1930
- Preceded by: Wendell D. Rockwood
- Succeeded by: Richard M. Russell

Personal details
- Born: Edward William Quinn; March 8, 1877 Cambridge, Massachusetts, U.S.
- Died: September 30, 1931 (aged 54) Cambridge, Massachusetts, U.S.
- Party: Democratic

Edward W. Quinn (March 8, 1877 – September 30, 1931) was involved in the politics of Cambridge, Massachusetts and was the mayor from 1918 to 1930. He lived in Middlesex County during the early part of the 20th century. In 1912, he was the Superintendent of the Streets under Mayor J. Edward Barry. In 1918, he was the Democratic candidate for mayor, and he held office for 12 years. In 1919, he set up a rent and housing committee as a way to give tenants a place to vent their grievances with rent profiteering. Quinn died on September 30, 1931, of heart disease.
