= Senator Sargent (disambiguation) =

Aaron A. Sargent (1827–1887) was a U.S. Senator from California 1873 to 1879. Senator Sargent may refer to:

- Henry Sargent (1770–1845), Massachusetts State Senate
- John Sargent (1799–1880), Massachusetts State Senate
- Jonathan Everett Sargent (1821–1890), New Hampshire State Senate
- Leonard Sargeant (1793–1880), Vermont State Senate
