= John H. H. McNamee =

American politician

29th Mayor of Cambridge, Massachusetts
- In office 1902–1904
- Preceded by: David T. Dickinson
- Succeeded by: Augustine J. Daly

Personal details
- Born: November 10, 1853 Randolph, Massachusetts, US
- Died: May 7, 1936 (aged 82) Dorchester, Boston, Massachusetts, US
- Spouse: Margaret Hagerty (m. 1878; died 1935)
- Children: Hugh E. McNamee
- Occupation: Bookbinder; Wire and cable manufacturer Bank president

John Hugh Henry McNamee (November 10, 1853 – May 7, 1936) was an American businessman who served as mayor of Cambridge, Massachusetts from 1902 to 1904.

== Early life ==
McNamee was born on November 10, 1853 in Randolph, Massachusetts. He was the eldest of eleven children. The family moved to Cambridge, Massachusetts in 1859. He took a three-year course at Boston College in lieu of high school.

== Business ==
After leaving school, McNamee went to work for the Reversible Collar Company. He was unhappy there and moved on to the University Press Company. After six months in the company's dry press room, McNamee decided to pursue a career in bookbinding. In 1871, he went to work for McDonald & Son and soon rose to the position of head workman in the finishing department. He did all of the finishing work on the work the company sent to the Centennial Exposition. In 1878, he went to New York City to study lead bookbinding. He returned after a year and resumed his work at McDonald & Son. He eventually founded his own firm with James Stinson. After a year and a half, McNamee bought out his partner and ran the company alone. He did bookbinding work for a number of private and public libraries, including the Harvard Library.

McNamee was also active in real estate. In 1889, he constructed Quincy Hall, a privately owned dormitory for Harvard University students. In 1895, he constructed a four-story commercial building on Brattle Street to accommodate his growing bookbinding business. The building also housed a number of other concerns, including the business and editorial offices of The Cambridge Tribune. In 1898, he purchased another commercial property on Brattle Street which housed the Holly Tree Inn.

In 1907, McNamee became the treasurer and manager of the newly formed Bay State Insulated Wire and Cable Company.

== Politics ==
In 1888, McNamee represented Ward 1 on the Cambridge commons council. He was twice an unsuccessful candidate for alderman and served on the city's board of library trustees and cemetery commission. In 1901, he was unopposed for the Democratic nomination for mayor. He defeated incumbent David T. Dickinson by 195 votes. McNamee was reelected in 1902, but lost the 1903 campaign to Augustine J. Daly by 70 votes. He was the Democratic candidate again in 1904, but lost to Daly by 293 votes. In 1906, McNamee backed James F. Aylward over incumbent mayor Charles H. Thurston for the Democratic nomination. Thurston won the nomination, but lost the general election to Walter C. Wardwell.

McNamee was a Democratic candidate in the 1905 Massachusetts gubernatorial election. He withdrew in favor of Charles W. Bartlett at the party convention. In 1906, McNamee was elected to the Democratic state central committee.

== Prudential Trust Company ==
In 1914, McNamee formed the Prudential Trust Company with other prominent Democrats, including Michael A. O'Leary and Thomas P. Riley. McNamee was the most active organizer and was chosen to be the company's president. Prudential Trust received its charter in January 1915 and started with $200,000 in capital and a surplus of $50,000. Its banking rooms at 83 Summer Street opened for business on June 1, 1915. On September 10, 1920, the Prudential Trust Company was closed by bank commissioner Joseph Allen after a special examination revealed that the bank's loans were in a bad condition. In 1921, the Massachusetts Supreme Judicial Court held the stockholders liable for the institution's losses. On April 18, 1921, Allen assessed their liability at 100%. On August 1, 1922, the Supreme Judicial Court approved the sale of the Prudential Trust Company's remaining assets to the Commonwealth Trust Company.

On September 28, 1922, McNamee was indicted on charges of larceny and conspiracy. It was alleged that he had stolen $97,500 from the bank's savings department and from "persons unknown", fraudulently loaned the bank's money, made false statements and omitted a true statement on the bank's books with the intent to defraud, and unlawfully authorized dividend and interest payments. On April 14, 1924, the indictments were quashed after the judge in the case ruled that the law under the indictments were drawn was not intended to apply to officers of banking corporations.

== Personal life ==
On August 29, 1878, McNamee married Margaret Hagerty of Brooklyn. They had one son, Hugh Edward. McNamee was the second grand knight of the Cambridge Council of the Knights of Columbus. He resided in large home on Mt. Vernon Street in Cambridge until 1907, when he moved to Mattapan to be closer to his factory in Hyde Park. He died on May 7, 1936 at his son's home in Dorchester.
