= James Morris Whiton Hall =

American businessman and politician

Mayor of Cambridge, Massachusetts
- In office January 1880 – January 1881
- Preceded by: Samuel L. Montague
- Succeeded by: James Augustus Fox

Member of the Cambridge, Massachusetts Board of Aldermen
- In office January 1879 – January 1880

Personal details
- Born: September 28, 1842 Boston, Massachusetts
- Died: December 6, 1926 North Pembroke, Massachusetts
- Party: Republican
- Spouse: Orianna Antoinette Breed
- Education: Lyman School, East Boston; Boston Latin School; Roxbury Latin School
- Occupation: Wholesale lumber merchant

James Morris Whiton Hall (September 28, 1842 – December 6, 1926) was a Massachusetts businessman and politician who served as the Mayor of Cambridge, Massachusetts.

== Notes ==
Political offices
Preceded by Samuel L. Montague	Mayor of Cambridge, Massachusetts; January 1880 - January 1881	Succeeded by James Augustus Fox
