= Senator Parmenter =

Senator Parmenter may refer to:

- Ezra Parmenter (1823–1873), Massachusetts State Senate
- Roswell A. Parmenter (1821–1904), New York State Senate
- William Parmenter (1789–1866), Massachusetts State Senate
