= Augustine Daly =

Augustine Daly may refer to:

- Augustin Daly (1838–1899), American drama critic, theatre manager and playwright
- Augustine J. Daly (died 1938), mayor of Cambridge, Massachusetts
