= Gus Williams (vaudeville) =

American actor

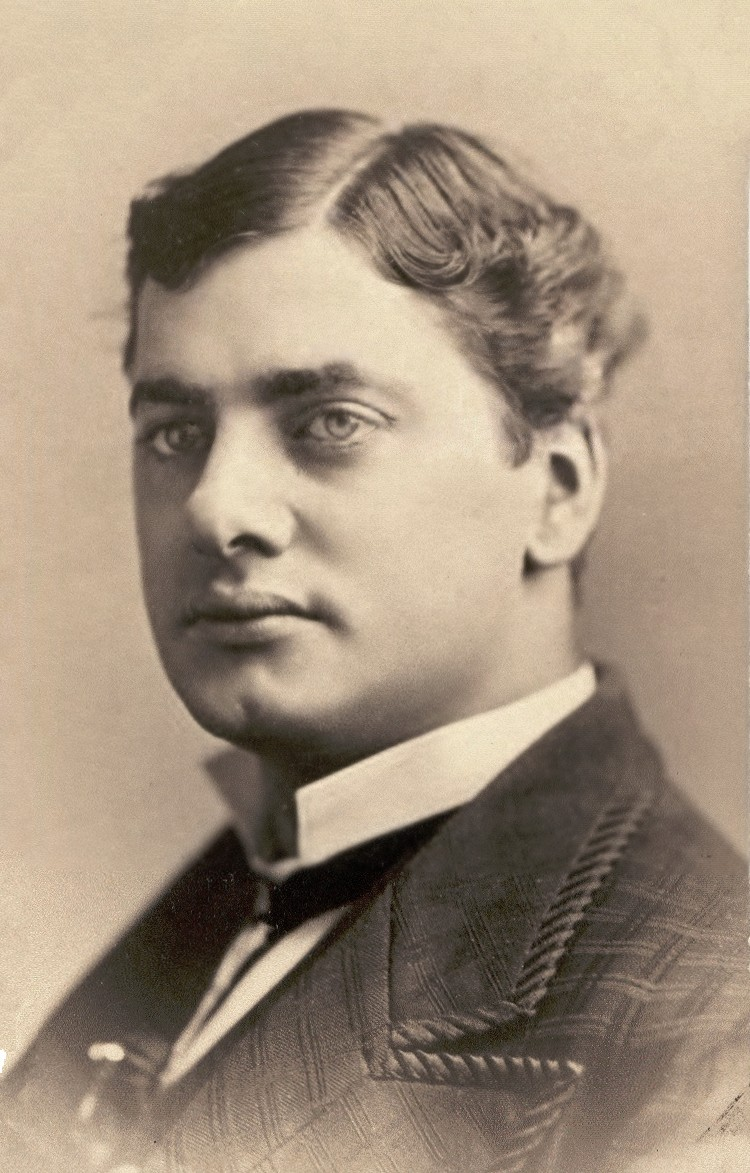
- Born: July 19, 1848; New York City, New York, U.S.A.
- Died: January 16, 1915 (aged 66); Yonkers, New York, U.S.A.
- Resting place: Green-Wood Cemetery
- Occupations: Vaudeville entertainer; songwriter
- Writing career
- Years active: 1868–1915

Gustave Wilhelm Leweck Jr. (July 19, 1848 – January 16, 1915) was an American comedian and songwriter.

== Early life ==
Gustave Wilhelm Leweck Jr. was born on July 19, 1848, the son of a New York City German-American fur importer. While in his early teens Williams left home to seek adventure in the American West. He made it as far as Indiana where circumstances deemed it necessary for the boy to find work as a farmhand. On August 12, 1862, fourteen-year-old Williams left farm work behind and joined Company F of the 48th Indiana Infantry to serve in the American Civil War.

== Career ==
Williams, who was probably a drummer boy, soon became popular in the service providing entertainment that helped alleviate the daily boredom of camp life. He first took to the stage on November 14, 1864, during the Union Army’s occupation of Huntsville, Alabama with J. B. Ashton’s Dramatic Company playing Carney in "The Pirate Legacy: The Wrecker’s Fate" by Charles H. Saunders.

Three years after the war’s end, Williams joined Tony Pastor’s vaudeville show where he would remain throughout his twenties. With Pastor he became popular as a Dutch-style comedian performing skits and singing songs in a comedic German accent. Two of his more popular tunes from that period were "Keiser Do You Want to Buy a Dog?" and "Dot Little German Band".

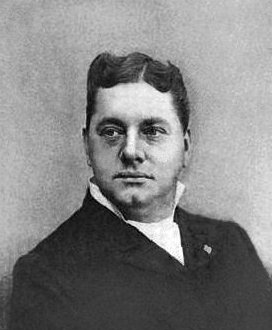
Gus Williams

Around 1879 Williams began touring in German farce comedies such as Our German Senator, One of the Finest, Keppler’s Fortunes, April Fool and Oh! What a Night. Over his career Williams would not only pen a number of popular comic songs but also a few sentimental ones, such as See that my Grave's Kept Green, Pretty Little Dark Blue Eyes and Don’t Forget Mother. In 1885 he assumed his stage name, Gus Williams, as his permanent legal name. At the peak of his career Williams became active in the campaign to better the wages of vaudeville players and was the first to demand and receive $500 for a week’s engagement as a monologist.

== Death ==
Williams continued to work well into his sixties though eventually no longer as a headliner. On January 16, 1915, Williams had a meeting with his booking agent, J. J. Armstrong, in New York and on his return trip home sent his sister-in-law a telegraph message from the Getty Square Train Station in Yonkers, asking her to tend to his wife Emma who was not well. Upon leaving the telegraph office Williams pulled out a pistol and shot himself in the temple. There was no suicide note, leaving family and friends to speculate on why he ended his life, though health issues and career concerns would appear to have topped the list. He was buried in Green-Wood Cemetery in Brooklyn.
