= Abraham Edwards =

Abraham Edwards may refer to:

- Abraham Edwards (Massachusetts politician)
- Abraham Edwards (Michigan politician)
