= William Bancroft =

American politician

William Amos Bancroft
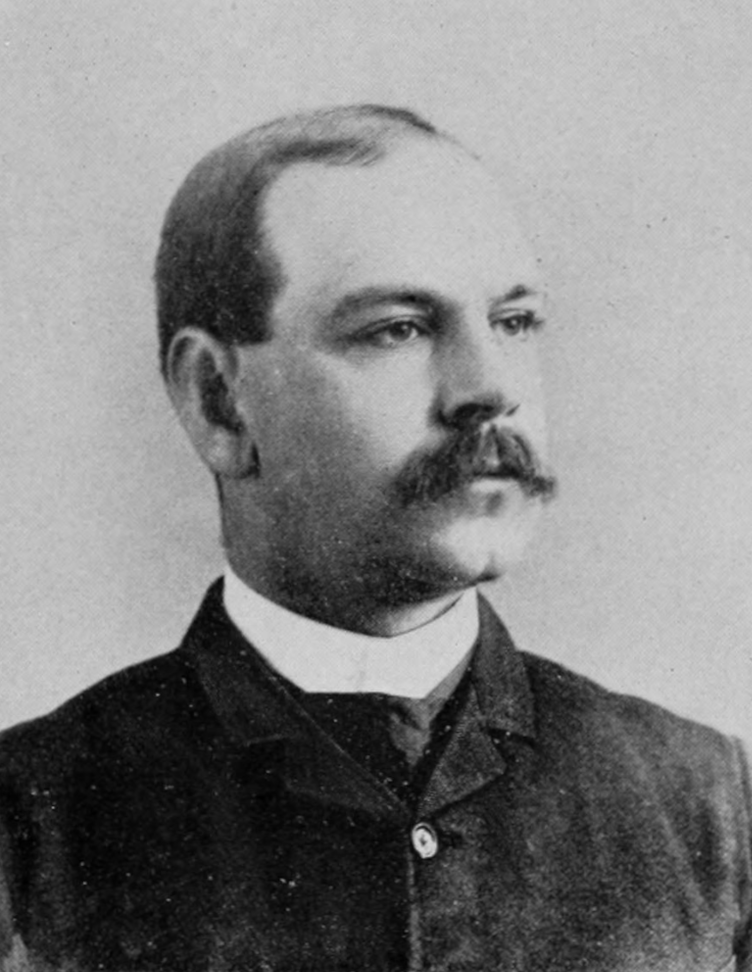

Mayor of Cambridge, Massachusetts
- In office January 1893 – January 1897
- Preceded by: Alpheus B. Alger
- Succeeded by: Alvin F. Sortwell

President of the Cambridge, Massachusetts Board of Aldermen
- In office 1891–1892

Member of the Cambridge, Massachusetts Board of Aldermen
- In office 1891–1892

Member of the Massachusetts House of Representatives
- In office 1883–1885

Member of the Cambridge, Massachusetts Common Council
- In office 1882–1882

Personal details
- Born: April 26, 1855 Groton, Massachusetts, U.S.
- Died: March 11, 1922 (aged 66) Cambridge, Massachusetts, U.S.
- Spouse: Mary Shaw
- Children: Hugh Bancroft, Guy Bancroft, Catherine (Bancroft) De Haviland
- Education: Harvard College, Harvard Law School
- Occupation: Attorney

Military service
- Allegiance: United States of America
- Rank: Private to colonel (Massachusetts Militia), Brigadier general (United States Volunteers)
- Unit: Massachusetts Militia; United States Volunteers
- Commands: Company B, Fifth Massachusetts Militia Regiment, Fifth Massachusetts Militia Regiment
- Battles/wars: Spanish–American War

William Amos Bancroft (April 26, 1855 – March 11, 1922) was a Massachusetts businessman, soldier and politician who served in the Massachusetts House of Representatives and on the Common Council, Board of Aldermen, and as the Mayor of Cambridge, Massachusetts (1893–1897). During the Spanish–American War, Bancroft was a brigadier general of United States Volunteers. From 1899 to 1916, he was the president of the Boston Elevated Railway.

== Early life ==
Bancroft was born on April 26, 1855, in Groton, Massachusetts, to Charles Bancroft and Lydia Emeline (Spaulding) Bancroft. He attended Lawrence Academy in his hometown and Phillips Exeter Academy in New Hampshire. After graduating from Phillips Exeter, he attended Harvard College, where he enlisted in the fifth regiment of the state militia in his Freshman year. He eventually rose to the rank of brigadier general. He was a member of the Harvard crew in 1877, 1878, and 1879.

== Legal career ==
Bancroft attended Harvard Law School and studied law in the office of William Burnham Stevens. He was admitted to the Suffolk County bar in 1881. In 1885, he opened a law office with Edward Francis Johnson, later mayor of Woburn, Massachusetts.

== Railway career ==
In 1885, Bancroft became the superintendent of the Cambridge Railroad. When it merged with the Charles River Street Railway, he was named president. When the company was absorbed by the West End Street Railway, he was appointed roadmaster of the system. He left in 1890 to focus on law and politics. In 1896, he became legal counsel to the Boston Elevated Railway. He became the company's vice president and chairman of the board the following year. From 1899 to 1916, he was company president.

== Politics ==
In 1890, Bancroft was elected to the Cambridge board of aldermen. In 1892, he was elected to his first of five consecutive terms as mayor.

== Death ==
Bancroft died on March 11, 1922, in Cambridge, Massachusetts. He was buried in Groton Cemetery alongside his parents.

== Notes ==
- Media related to William Amos Bancroft at Wikimedia Commons

Political offices
Preceded by Alpheus B. Alger	Mayor of Cambridge, Massachusetts; January 1893 – January 1897	Succeeded by Alvin F. Sortwell
Business positions
Preceded by William A. Gaston	President of the Boston Elevated Railway; 1899–1916	Succeeded by Matthew C. Brush
