= J. Warren Merrill =

American politician

Joseph Warren Merrill
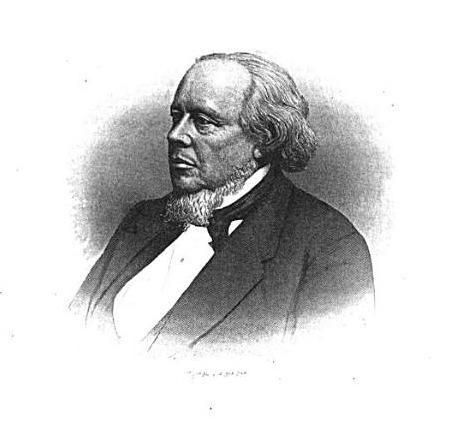

12th Mayor of Cambridge, Massachusetts
- In office January 1865 – January 1867
- Preceded by: Zebina L. Raymond
- Succeeded by: Ezra Parmenter

Personal details
- Born: December 13, 1819; South Hampton, New Hampshire
- Died: November 12, 1889
- Spouse: Hannah Brown Wattson (m. 1848)

Joseph Warren Merrill (December 13, 1819 – November 12, 1889) was a Massachusetts politician who served as the Mayor of Cambridge, Massachusetts. He also served as the Chair of the Colby College Board of Trustees from 1885 until his death in 1889.

== Personal life ==
J. Warren Merrill was born on December 13, 1819, in South Hampton, New Hampshire, to Nathan and Sally (Page) Merrill. He married Hannah Brown Wattson in 1848, with whom he had two daughters and four sons. He died in Cambridge, Massachusetts, on November 12, 1889.

== Notes ==
Political offices
Preceded by Zebina L. Raymond	Mayor of Cambridge, Massachusetts; January 1865 – January 1867	Succeeded by Ezra Parmenter
