= Joseph DeGuglielmo =

American judge

City Manager of Cambridge, Massachusetts
- In office 1967–1968
- Preceded by: John J. Curry
- Succeeded by: James Sullivan

Mayor of Cambridge, Massachusetts
- In office 1950–1952
- Preceded by: Edward Crane
- Succeeded by: John J. Foley

Personal details
- Born: December 10, 1908
- Died: May 18, 1983 (aged 74)
- Party: Democratic Party
- Spouse(s): Angela Ferraro (?–1974; her death); Alice O'Regan (?–1978; his death)
- Children: Claire Norton
- Education: Harvard University; Boston University School of Law
- Occupation: Attorney; City Manager; Judge

Joseph A. DeGuglielmo (1908–1983) was an American judge and politician who served as associate justice of the Boston Municipal Court and was mayor and city manager of Cambridge, Massachusetts.

== Early life ==
DeGuglielmo was born and raised in Cambridge. He graduated from Harvard University in 1929 and Boston University School of Law in 1933. He was a member of the Alpha Phi Delta fraternity and was its national president. During World War II he served in the United States Army.

== Public service career ==
=== Cambridge ===
DeGuglielmo began his public career in 1938 as assistant city solicitor of Cambridge. From 1945 to 1963 he was a member of the Cambridge City Council. From 1952 to 1954 he was mayor of Cambridge, an office that is appointed by the City Council. As mayor he was also chairman ex- officio of the School Committee. He later served as city manager from 1967 to 1968.

=== Jurist ===
In 1957, DeGuglielmo was appointed an assistant district attorney of Middlesex County.

In 1971, he was appointed an associate justice of the Boston Municipal Court by Governor Francis Sargent. He retired from the bench in 1978.

=== Other political activities ===
DeGuglielmo served as chairman of the Cambridge Democratic Committee. He was friend of John F. Kennedy and campaigned for him during Kennedy's first congressional run.

== Personal life ==
DeGuglielmo was married twice. His first wife, Angela Ferraro, died in 1974. He remained married to his second wife, Alice O'Regan, until his death in 1978.

His nephew is comic Jimmy Tingle.

== Death ==
DeGuglielmo died on May 18, 1983, in Boston.
