= David T. Dickinson =

American politician

David Taggart Dickinson
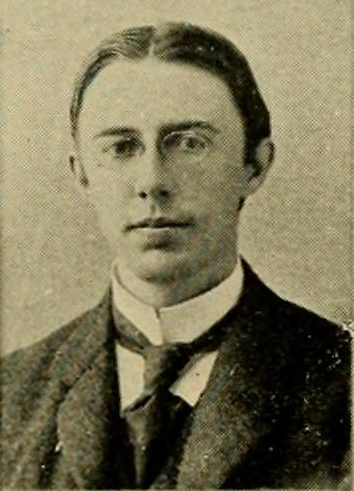
- David T. Dickinson in 1895

28th Mayor of Cambridge, Massachusetts
- In office January 1901 – January 1902
- Preceded by: Edgar R. Champlin
- Succeeded by: John H. H. McNamee

Member of the Massachusetts House of Representatives First Middlesex District

Member of the Massachusetts House of Representatives Fifth Middlesex District
- Succeeded by: Albert S. Apsey

Personal details
- Born: August 13, 1867 Cambridge, Massachusetts, U.S.
- Died: November 27, 1930 (aged 63) Cambridge, Massachusetts, U.S.
- Party: Republican
- Spouse: Carrie M. Story (m. 1892)
- Children: David, Jr., (b. 1894), Melvin (b. 1895), Elbra (b.1897), Elisabeth (b. 1901)
- Education: Harvard College, Class of 1888; Harvard Law School class of 1891.
- Occupation: Attorney

David Taggart Dickinson (August 13, 1867 – November 27, 1930) was a Massachusetts attorney and politician who served in the Massachusetts House of Representatives and as the twenty-eighth Mayor of Cambridge, Massachusetts.

== Personal life ==
Dickinson was born in Cambridge, Massachusetts to Alexander and Elizabeth (Taggart) Dickinson. He married Carrie M. Story of Manchester, New Hampshire on December 8, 1892. The couple had four children together.

== Notes ==
Political offices
Preceded by Edgar R. Champlin	28th Mayor of Cambridge, Massachusetts; January 1901 – January 1902	Succeeded by John H. H. McNamee
