= Alpheus B. Alger =

American politician (1854–1895)

Alpheus Brown Alger
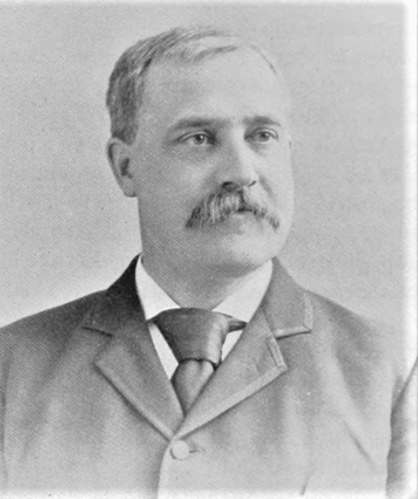
- Alger c. 1892

Mayor of Cambridge, Massachusetts
- In office January 1891 – January 1892
- Preceded by: Henry Gilmore
- Succeeded by: William Bancroft

Member of the Massachusetts State Senate Third Middlesex District
- In office 1886–1887

Member of the Board of Aldermen of Cambridge, Massachusetts
- In office 1884–1884

Personal details
- Born: October 8, 1854 Lowell, Massachusetts, U.S.
- Died: May 4, 1895 (aged 40) Cambridge, Massachusetts, U.S.
- Party: Democratic
- Education: Harvard College, Harvard Law School
- Occupation: Attorney

Alpheus Brown Alger (October 8, 1854 – May 4, 1895) was a Massachusetts politician who served in the Massachusetts State Senate, as a member of the Board of Aldermen and as the Mayor of Cambridge, Massachusetts.

== Biography ==
Alger was born to Edwin Alden and Amanda Malvina Alger, née Buswell, in Lowell, Massachusetts. From October 1875 to January 1877 Alger studied law at Harvard Law School and he was admitted to the bar for the County of Middlesex on June 4, 1877. After being admitted to the bar, he began practicing law with his father's firm, Brown & Alger in Boston while living in Cambridge.

Alger was active in the Democratic party. From 1878 to 1891 Alger was a member of the Cambridge Democratic Committee, from 1884 to 1891 he was a member of Massachusetts' Democratic party state committee, and he represented Massachusetts' eight Congressional District at the 1888 Democratic National Convention. He died on May 4, 1895, in North Cambridge, Massachusetts.

Political offices
Preceded by Henry Gilmore	Mayor of Cambridge, Massachusetts; January 1891 – January 1892	Succeeded by William Bancroft
