= Charles H. Saunders =

American politician

Charles Hicks Saunders
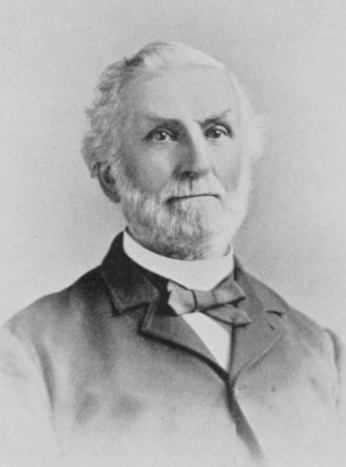

14th Mayor of Cambridge, Massachusetts
- In office January 1868 – January 1870
- Preceded by: Ezra Parmenter
- Succeeded by: Edgar R. Champlin

Member of the Cambridge, Massachusetts Board of Aldermen
- In office 1861–1862

Member of the Cambridge, Massachusetts Common Council
- In office 1853–1854

Member of the Cambridge, Massachusetts Board of Assessors
- In office 1864–1867

Personal details
- Born: November 10, 1821 Cambridge, Massachusetts
- Died: December 5, 1901 Cambridge, Massachusetts
- Spouse: Mary Brooks Ball
- Children: Annie Boylston Saunders, born June 7, 1853; Carrie Huntington Saunders, born October 14. 1856; Mary Lizzie Saunders, born July 9, 1860; Charles Robertson Saunders (November 22, 1862–1912)

Charles Hicks Saunders (November 10, 1821 – December 5, 1901) was a Massachusetts politician who served on the Common Council, Board of Aldermen and as the Mayor of Cambridge, Massachusetts. Saunders was the son of William Saunders, a housewright and cabinet maker in Cambridge, and Sarah Flagg. Through his Sarah Flagg Saunders, Charles Hicks Saunders was the great-grandson of John Hicks, an American Patriot killed by the British in Arlington, Massachusetts during the British retreat from Concord. He was married to Mary Brooks, née Ball, in 1849.

The Saunders family home now houses the admissions offices for Lesley University in Cambridge.

== Notes ==
Political offices
Preceded by Ezra Parmenter	14th Mayor of Cambridge, Massachusetts; January 1868 – January 1870	Succeeded by Hamlin R. Harding
