= Evelyn Aldrich =

American businesswoman and banking executive

- Occupations: Businessperson, banking executive
- Employer: American International Corporation
- Known for: First woman to address the American Institute of Banking; Head of women's department at major New York bank

Evelyn Aldrich was an American businesswoman and banking executive employed by the American International Corporation in New York City in 1917. She served as head of the women's department at a major New York bank and became a pioneering figure in women's participation in the banking industry during World War I.

== Career ==
=== American International Corporation ===
Aldrich was employed by the American International Corporation, a major American business conglomerate involved in international trade and wartime industrial projects. The corporation was notably involved in the Hog Island Shipbuilding plant, a major shipbuilding facility during World War I.

=== Banking Leadership ===
Aldrich held the position of head of the women's department at a large New York bank, making her one of the few women in senior banking positions during the early 20th century. In this role, she was responsible for overseeing the employment and management of female bank employees, a growing demographic in the banking industry during World War I as men were called to military service.

== American Institute of Banking ==
=== Committee Appointment ===
She was appointed to a special committee of the American Institute of Banking by its president, R.S. Hecht, who served as vice president of the Hibernia Bank and Trust Company of New Orleans. The committee also included two other women, identified in the organization's Journal only as "Mrs. Bruce Baird of Chicago" and "Mrs. E. C. Erwin of New Orleans," as well as three men.

=== Historic Address ===
On September 18, 1918, Aldrich delivered an address to 500 delegates at the American Institute of Banking's sixteenth annual convention in Denver, Colorado, becoming the first woman in the organization's history to speak at any of its conventions. Her speech focused on the challenges facing women employees in the banking industry and the attitudes of male colleagues toward female workers.

In her address, Aldrich stated that she had "not found that woman differed much from man in the matter of business capacity," arguing that "ability is not so much a matter of sex as of the individual." She addressed the issue of women losing enthusiasm in banking careers, attributing this to the attitudes of male colleagues who made female employees feel unwelcome and limited their advancement opportunities.

Aldrich criticized the contradictory expectations placed on women in banking, stating: "You resent the girl, even the capable, ambitious girl, who comes into the bank all fluffy-ruffles, flossy clothes and powdered nose. Yet you insist on womanly women. You expect these poor girls to come to the bank door women and then turn into men."

=== Committee Work and Resolutions ===
Together with her committee colleagues, Aldrich submitted a preamble and resolution aimed at addressing the needs of women in the banking industry. These proposals were adopted by the institute with a "near unanimous" vote, representing a significant step forward in recognizing women's roles in banking education and professional development.

== Historical Context ==
Aldrich's career and advocacy occurred during a period of significant change in American banking and women's employment. World War I created unprecedented opportunities for women to enter traditionally male-dominated fields, including banking, as men were called to military service. Her position as head of a women's department and her role as the first female speaker at the American Institute of Banking convention reflected the evolving role of women in the financial sector during this transformative period.

The American Institute of Banking, founded in 1900, was the educational arm of the American Bankers Association and played a crucial role in professionalizing banking education. Aldrich's participation in its leadership and her historic address marked an important milestone in the organization's recognition of women's contributions to the banking industry.

== Legacy ==
Aldrich's pioneering role as the first woman to address the American Institute of Banking convention established an important precedent for women's participation in banking leadership and education. Her advocacy for better treatment and advancement opportunities for women bank employees contributed to broader discussions about gender equality in the financial sector during the early 20th century.
