= Sidney Willard =

American academic and politician

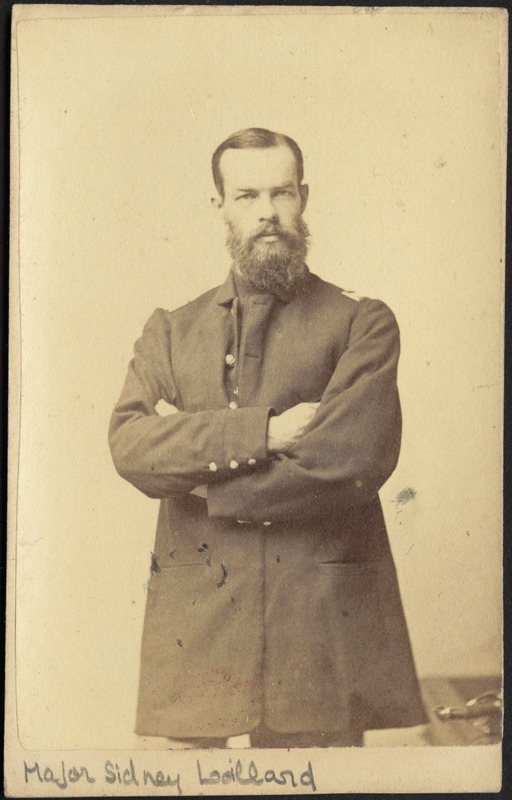
- Major Sidney Willard

Mayor of Cambridge, Massachusetts
- In office April 1848 – April 1851
- Preceded by: James D. Green
- Succeeded by: George Stevens

Personal details
- Born: September 19, 1780 Beverly, Massachusetts
- Died: December 6, 1856 (aged 76) Cambridge, Massachusetts
- Spouse(s): Elizabeth Ann Andrews, m. December 28, 1815, d. September 17, 1817. Hannah S. Heard, m. January 27, 1819, d. 1821.
- Education: Harvard College
- Occupation: Educator; Politician

Sidney Willard (September 19, 1780 – December 6, 1856) was an American academic and politician who served in the Massachusetts House of Representatives, on the Massachusetts Governor's Council and as the second Mayor of Cambridge, Massachusetts.

Willard was the Librarian of Harvard from 1800 to 1805. From 1807 to 1831 he was the Hancock Professor of Hebrew and other Oriental Languages at Harvard College. Willard was elected a Fellow of the American Academy of Arts and Sciences in 1808.

Willard was the son of Harvard president Joseph Willard and Mary (Sheafe) Willard.

Willard was a member of the Anthology Club, and a founder of The Literary Miscellany, established and edited the American Monthly Review (4 vols., 1832/3), was editor of The Christian Register, contributed to numerous periodicals, and published a Hebrew Grammar (Cambridge, 1817), and Memoirs of Youth and Manhood (2 vols., 1855).

His son in law, John Bartlett, was an American writer and publisher whose best known work, Bartlett's Familiar Quotations, has been continually revised and reissued for a century after his death.

Political offices
Preceded by James D. Green	Mayor of Cambridge, Massachusetts; April 1848 – April 1851	Succeeded by George Stevens
