= Charles Theodore Russell =

American politician

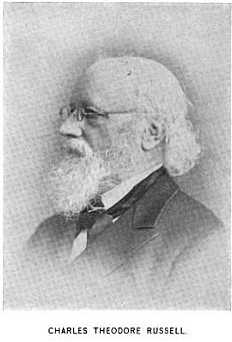

Mayor of Cambridge, Massachusetts
- In office July 31, 1861 – January 1863
- Preceded by: James D. Green
- Succeeded by: George C. Richardson

Personal details
- Born: November 20, 1815 Princeton, Massachusetts
- Died: January 16, 1896 (aged 80) Cambridge, Massachusetts
- Spouse: Sarah Elizabeth Ballister
- Children: Charles Theodore Russell, Jr. William E. Russell
- Education: Harvard College
- Occupation: Attorney

Charles Theodore Russell (November 20, 1815 – January 16, 1896) was a Massachusetts politician who served in both branches of the Massachusetts legislature and as the Mayor of Cambridge, Massachusetts. Russell was the father of Cambridge Mayor and Massachusetts Governor William E. Russell.

== See also ==
- 1877 Massachusetts legislature
- 1878 Massachusetts legislature

== Notes ==
Political offices
Preceded by James D. Green	Mayor of Cambridge, Massachusetts; July 31, 1861 - January 1863	Succeeded by George C. Richardson
