= Henry Oscar Houghton =

American printer and publisher, briefly mayor of Cambridge (1823–1895)

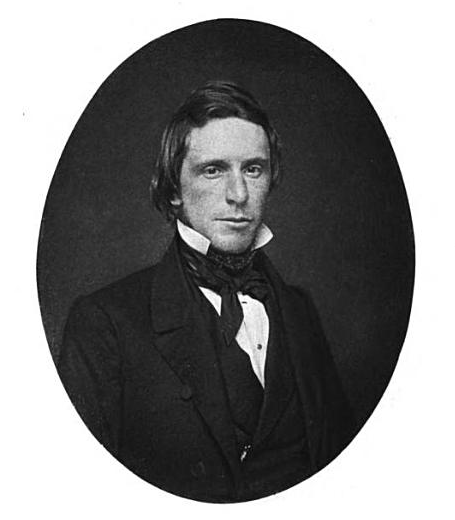
- H.O. Houghton, 1846

Mayor of Cambridge, Massachusetts
- In office January 1872 – January 1873
- Preceded by: Hamlin R. Harding
- Succeeded by: Isaac Bradford

Personal details
- Born: April 30, 1823 Sutton, Vermont, U.S.
- Died: August 25, 1895 (aged 72) North Andover, Massachusetts, U.S.
- Education: University of Vermont
- Occupation: Publisher

Henry Oscar Houghton (/ˈhoʊtən/; April 30, 1823 – August 25, 1895) was an American publisher, co-founder of Houghton Mifflin and a mayor of Cambridge, Massachusetts.

== Biography ==
Houghton was born into a poor family in Sutton, Vermont. At age thirteen, he started working as an apprentice at The Burlington Free Press, where he became a typesetter. After graduation from the University of Vermont, he moved to Boston to work first as a reporter, then proofreader. He then joined a small Cambridge firm, Freeman & Bolles, that typeset and printed books for Little, Brown and Company. At age 25, he became a partner, and in 1849, the company was renamed Bolles and Houghton. After Bolles left in 1851, Houghton briefly entered a partnership with his cousin, Rufus Haywood, then with Edmund Hatch Bennett, before taking on full responsibility in 1855. In 1852, Houghton moved the business to a property beside the Charles River, renaming it the Riverside Press.

Before the Riverside Press, American books had generally been printed with poor ink on cheap paper. Houghton insisted on much higher quality; his motto was "Do it well or not at all". The result was very successful. He became the main printer for publishers Ticknor and Fields, and, in 1863, was engaged by G. & C. Merriam Company to print and bind their new dictionary.

In 1864, Houghton entered the publishing business and formed a partnership with a New York publisher, Melancthon M. Hurd, who obtained half interest in the Riverside Press. Within three years, the company increased its workforce from 90 to 300 employees. Hurd & Houghton struggled initially as a publisher, contending especially with lackluster periodical sales, and would not turn a profit until 1870. Hurd & Houghton was the successor of James G. Gregory, W. A. Townsend & Co. and Stringer & Townsend.

The Riverside Press continued to operate successfully, however, and Houghton purchased the property it occupied in 1867. George Harrison Mifflin (1845–1921) became a partner in 1872, the same year that Houghton served as mayor of Cambridge. In 1878, when Hurd retired, Houghton joined with James R. Osgood of Ticknor and Fields, merging their firms to create Houghton, Osgood and Company. The firm was plagued by debts brought in by Osgood, and dissolved in 1880 when Osgood left the partnership. Houghton and Mifflin then formed Houghton, Mifflin and Co.; Lawson Valentine, who became a partner and provided $200,000 in fresh capital, helped to mitigate their debts. Houghton's firm also retained the right to the Tickner and Fields backlist, from which it could freely benefit.

Houghton died at his summer home in North Andover, Massachusetts on August 25, 1895. He had one son and three daughters. In his 1891 will, he appointed daughter Elizabeth Harris Houghton "representative to nominate a patient for the free bed the testator established in the Cambridge hospital".

== Bibliography ==
- Ballou, Ellen B. (1970). The Building of the House. Boston: Houghton Mifflin and Co.
- Scudder, Horace Elisha (1897). Henry Oscar Houghton: A Biographical Outline. Cambridge, Massachusetts: Riverside Press. OCLC 609629235.

Political offices
Preceded by Hamlin R. Harding	Mayor of Cambridge, Massachusetts; January 1872 – January 1873	Succeeded by Isaac Bradford
