= DeRosay-McNamee House =

Historic house in Massachusetts, United States

- U.S. National Register of Historic Places
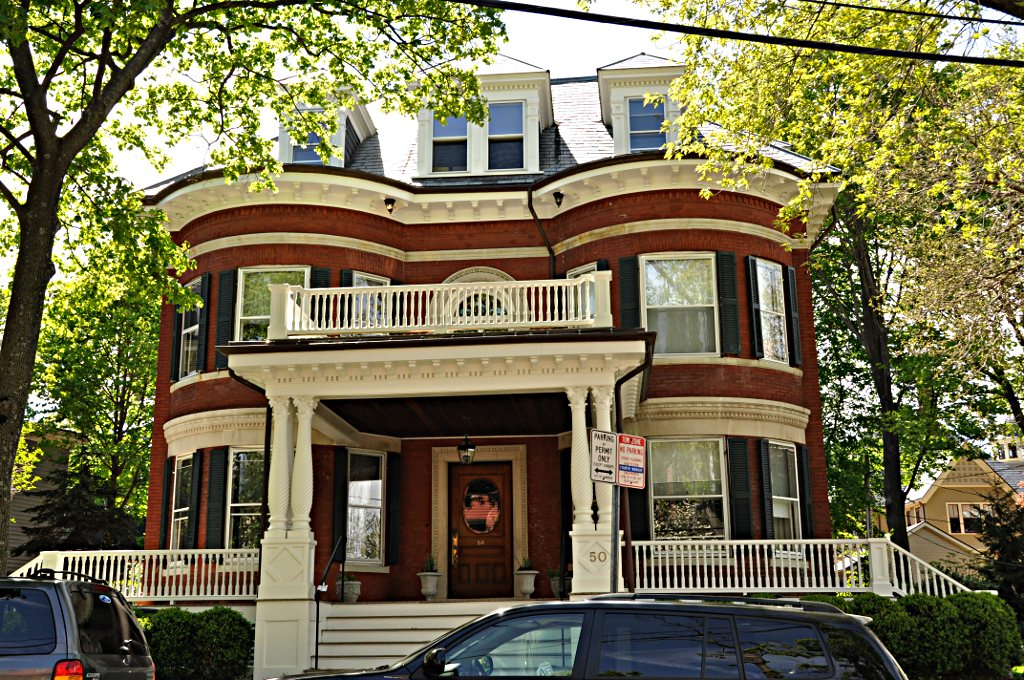

- Location within Massachusetts Location within the United States
- Location: Cambridge, Massachusetts
- Coordinates: 42°23′14.2″N 71°07′17.9″W
- Built: 1895
- Architect: Clarke, William E.
- Architectural style: Colonial Revival
- MPS: Cambridge MRA
- NRHP reference No.: 90000142
- Added to NRHP: March 2, 1990

The DeRosay-McNamee House is an historic house at 50 Mt. Vernon Street in Cambridge, Massachusetts. It is a 2 1/2-story brick house, with a dormered hip roof and limestone trim. Its main facade exhibits high-quality Colonial Revival styling, with a symmetrical appearance that includes rounded bays flanking the main entry, and an entrance porch supported by clusters of distinctively turned columns. It was built c. 1895-6 by the principal owner of a local brickyard, who pioneered modernizations allowing for the year-round manufacture of bricks. It was later home to Cambridge mayor John H. H. McNamee.

The house was listed on the National Register of Historic Places in 1990.

== See also ==
- National Register of Historic Places listings in Cambridge, Massachusetts
