= John B. Atkinson =

American politician and military officer

Col John B. Atkinson

City Manager of Cambridge, Massachusetts
- In office 1942–1952
- Preceded by: Position created
- Succeeded by: John J. Curry

Personal details
- Born: June 17, 1894 Cambridge, Massachusetts
- Died: April 28, 1965 (aged 70) Alicante
- Spouse: Louise O'Shea (1922–1965; his death)
- Children: Thomas Atkinson
- Education: Boston College; Harvard University
- Occupation: Shoe importer

Col John B. Atkinson (June 17, 1894 – April 28, 1965) was an American city manager, businessman, and military officer who served as the first city manager of Cambridge, Massachusetts.

== Early life ==
Col John B. Atkinson was born in Cambridge on June 17, 1894, to Mr. and Mrs. Thomas F. Atkinson. He graduated from Boston College in 1916. In 1922 he married Louise O'Shea of Brighton. They had one son.

== Military career ==
Atkinson enlisted in the United States Army two days after the country entered World War I. He was sent to the first Officer's Training Camp in Plattsburgh, New York and received his commission as a second lieutenant. In 1917 he was sent to France and assigned to work with the British Expeditionary Force. He was later moved to the 302nd Motor Transportation Corps and was promoted to first lieutenant in September 1918. A few months later he was promoted to captain. He also served four months as an acting major and was in charge of 1000 men and 400 trucks. Atkinson saw service during the battles of Château-Thierry and Soissons and the Meuse–Argonne offensive.

After the war, Atkinson was mustered out of the federal service and commissioned as a major in the 1st Supply Train Unit of the 26th Infantry Division of the Massachusetts National Guard. In 1927 he was promoted to Lieutenant Colonel. In 1931 he was appointed a personal aide to Governor Joseph B. Ely. He retired with the rank of Colonel.

== Business career ==
After college, entered the wholesale shoe business with his father. Atkinson served as president of the Atkinson Shore Corp. and a director of the Thomas Morgan Co., Scully Signal Co., LeSol Inc., Britannic Slippers, and the American Institute for Economic Research. He was the North and South American representative of the Bata Corporation and was a member of its board of directors. He made over 90 trips to Europe and in 1939 he was detained in Czechoslovakia after Nazi Germany took over the country and the Bata factory.

== City manager ==
After the position of city manager was created in 1942, Atkinson, who had never been involved in politics, became the front-runner for the office. It was believed that Atkinson would bring a businesslike approach to the office. He was supported by former Governor Charles F. Hurley. On January 5, 1942, the council voted 6 to 3 in favor of appointing Atkinson. As city manager, Atkinson oversaw the government of Massachusetts' fifth largest city. By 1945 he reduced the city's debt from $11.6 million to $6.4 million while lowering the tax rate. Atkinson was responsible for purchasing the city's first snow plows and modern equipment for the police and fire departments. He transferred responsibility for road repair, municipal building maintenance, and publishing from private contractors to city bureaus. After World War II he sent buyers across the United States to purchase military surplus, which allowed the city to purchase goods at a deep discount. He also served as vice-president of the International City Managers' Association. In 1948 he was reappointed by a 6 to 3 vote, with the 3 opposition councilors voting for Boston Chamber of Commerce president Michael T. Kelleher. In 1949 he earned a degree in public administration from Harvard University. On August 4, 1952, the city council voted 5 to 4 to replace Atkinson with school headmaster John J. Curry. When he left office, Cambridge was one of only two cities in the state to have a lower tax rate in 1952 than in 1941.

== Later life ==
Following his removal, Col John B. Atkinson returned to the business of shore importation. He imported shoes from England, Italy, France, Belgium, Canada, and Mexico. He died on April 28, 1965, in Alicante.
