= Matthew C. Brush =

American businessman (1877–1940)

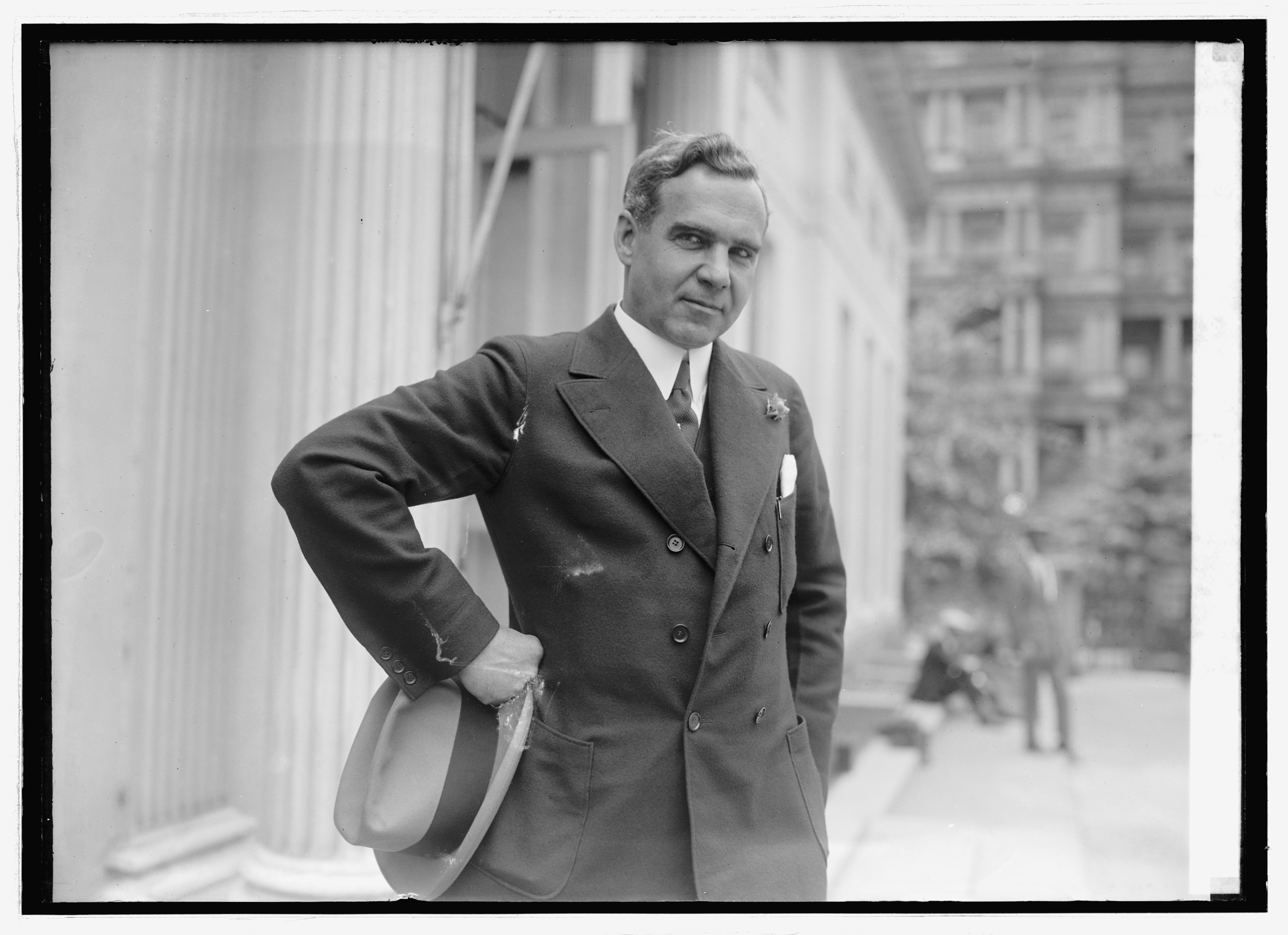
- Born: Matthew Chauncey Brush; October 12, 1877; Stillwater, Minnesota, U.S.
- Died: October 15, 1940 (aged 63); New York, New York, U.S.
- Education: Massachusetts Institute of Technology
- Occupation: President of American International Corporation
- Years active: 1901–1933
- Spouse: Elizabeth Hunger (m. 1933)

Matthew Chauncey Brush (October 12, 1877 – October 15, 1940) was an American industrialist. He was president of American International Corporation, one of the largest investment trusts of its time. He was also the president of the Boston Elevated Railway and the American International Shipbuilding, which constructed the Hog Islanders.

== Early life ==
Brush was born on October 12, 1877, in Stillwater, Minnesota. He attended public schools in Stillwater and Chicago. He graduated from the Armour Institute.

From 1893 to 1895, Brush worked as a newspaper hawker in Minneapolis and Chicago. He then worked as a hotel clerk in Chicago. He then clerked for Franklin MacVeagh & Co. At 19, he became clerk of the Northwest, a passenger steamer. From the ages of 22 to 27, he was a clerk or purser aboard various Great Lakes passenger steamers owned by Northern Steamship Company.

In 1901, he received his Bachelor of Science in mechanical engineering from the Massachusetts Institute of Technology. He then worked as a roundhouse foreman for the Union Pacific Railroad in Omaha, Nebraska. By 1903, he was a general foreman for the Chicago, Rock Island and Pacific Railroad in Goodland, Kansas.

== Career ==
In July 1903, Brush became assistant to the president of the Boston Suburban Electric Companies, a holding company which owned numerous street railways in Greater Boston as well as Norumbega Park. In 1904, he was named general manager of the Boston Suburban Electric Companies and given full control over all of its enterprises. In 1909, Brush became the general manager of the Buffalo and Lake Erie Traction Company, Jamestown and Lake Erie Railroad, and Jamestown and Chautauqua Steamship Company.

In November 1910, Brush returned to Boston to become assistant to the vice president of the Boston Elevated Railway. In 1912, he was promoted to the newly created position of second vice president. In 1916, he succeeded William Bancroft as president of the Boston Elevated Railway. He led negotiations that allowed for the takeover of the Elevated by the commonwealth of Massachusetts.

In 1918, Brush became the vice president and director of the American International Corporation. Later that year, he was named president of the American International Shipbuilding Company, a subsidiary of AIC. He managed the company's shipyard on Hog Island, which built 122 ships for the U. S. government between 1918 and 1921. On February 4, 1921, the company turned over the shipyard to the United States Shipping Board. Due to his success at Hog Island, AIC gave him general control over its subsidiary and trading companies. He also served as president of the G. Amsinck & Co. In 1923, Brush was named president of the American International Corporation. He succeeded Charles A. Stone, who resigned due to ill health. Brush retired as president in 1933, but remained with the company as chairman of the board.

By the time of his retirement, Brush was a member of 47 corporate boards. At various points, he was a director of Republic Steel, Texas and Pacific Railway, Pacific Mail Steamship Company, Remington Arms, Missouri Pacific Railroad, Continental Can Company, United States Industrial Alcohol Company, Foster Wheeler, Wabash Railroad, Ann Arbor Railroad, United States Rubber Company, Manhattan Company, Brooklyn–Manhattan Transit Corporation, and Marion Steam Shovel Company.

== Personal life and death ==
On June 17, 1933, Brush married his secretary, Elizabeth Hunger, at the home of AIC vice president Henry Arthur in Larchmont, New York. They resided in Norwalk, Connecticut.

Brush died of a heart attack on October 15, 1940, at Doctors Hospital in New York City. At the time of his death, he was a candidate for Republican presidential elector in Connecticut. His funeral was held at St. Bartholomew's Episcopal Church. He left an estate of $3.6 million gross and $1.9 million net.

In 1957, his widow sold his 10.4 acre estate to the Norwalk Jewish Center. She died in 1982 at the age of 85.
