= Hamlin R. Harding =

American politician (1825–1889)

Hamlin Rand Harding
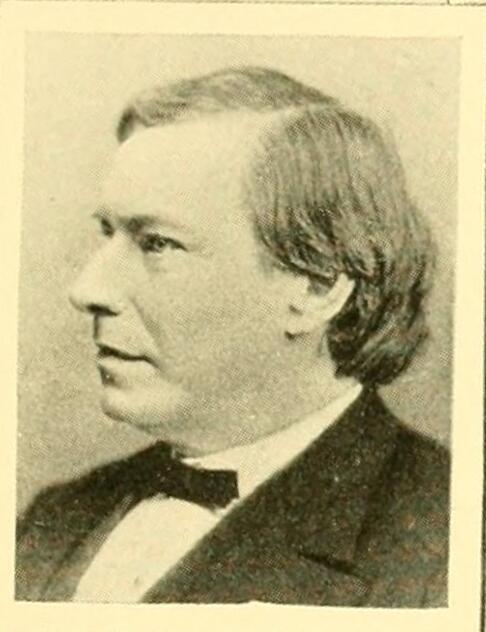
- Harding in 1896

Member of the Cambridge, Massachusetts Board of Aldermen

Mayor of Cambridge, Massachusetts
- In office January 1870 – January 1872
- Preceded by: Charles H. Saunders
- Succeeded by: Henry Oscar Houghton

President of the Cambridge, Massachusetts Common Council
- In office 1860–1861
- Preceded by: James C. Fisk
- Succeeded by: Jared Shepard

Member of the Cambridge, Massachusetts Common Council
- In office 1859–1861

Member of the Massachusetts House of Representatives
- In office 1862–1862

Member of the Massachusetts House of Representatives
- In office 1867–1867

Personal details
- Born: April 14, 1825
- Died: December 16, 1889 (aged 64) Cambridge, Massachusetts

Hamlin Rand Harding (April 14, 1825 - December 16, 1889) was a Massachusetts politician who served as a member of and President of the Cambridge, Massachusetts Common Council and the Mayor of Cambridge.

== Notes ==
Political offices
Preceded by Charles H. Saunders	Mayor of Cambridge, Massachusetts; January 1870 – January 1872	Succeeded by Henry Oscar Houghton
Preceded by James C. Fisk	President of the Cambridge, Massachusetts; Common Council; 1860-1861	Succeeded by Jared Shepard
