= George H. Mifflin =

American publishing executive (1845–1921)

George Harrison Mifflin (1845–1921) was an executive in the publishing business. He served as president of Houghton Mifflin.

Mifflin was born in Boston. He graduated from Harvard. He joined Hurd and Houghton in 1867 and worked for its subsidiary Riverside Press. He continued with Hurd and Houghton's successor companies: "Houghton, Osgood & Co., 1878–1880; Houghton, Mifflin & Co., 1880–1888; and the Houghton Mifflin Company, having been President of the last-named company since 1908". He partnered with Henry Oscar Houghton in 1872.

Houghton died in 1895 and Mifflin took over leadership of Houghton, Mifflin & Company. He communicated with some of its prominent authors through good times and bad.

Mifflin was at first skeptical of the company's investment in educational publishing. He was socially connected to Sarah Wyman Whitman, who designed elegant book covers for the business.

He died in Boston at the age of 75.
