= E. Denise Simmons =

American politician (born 1951)

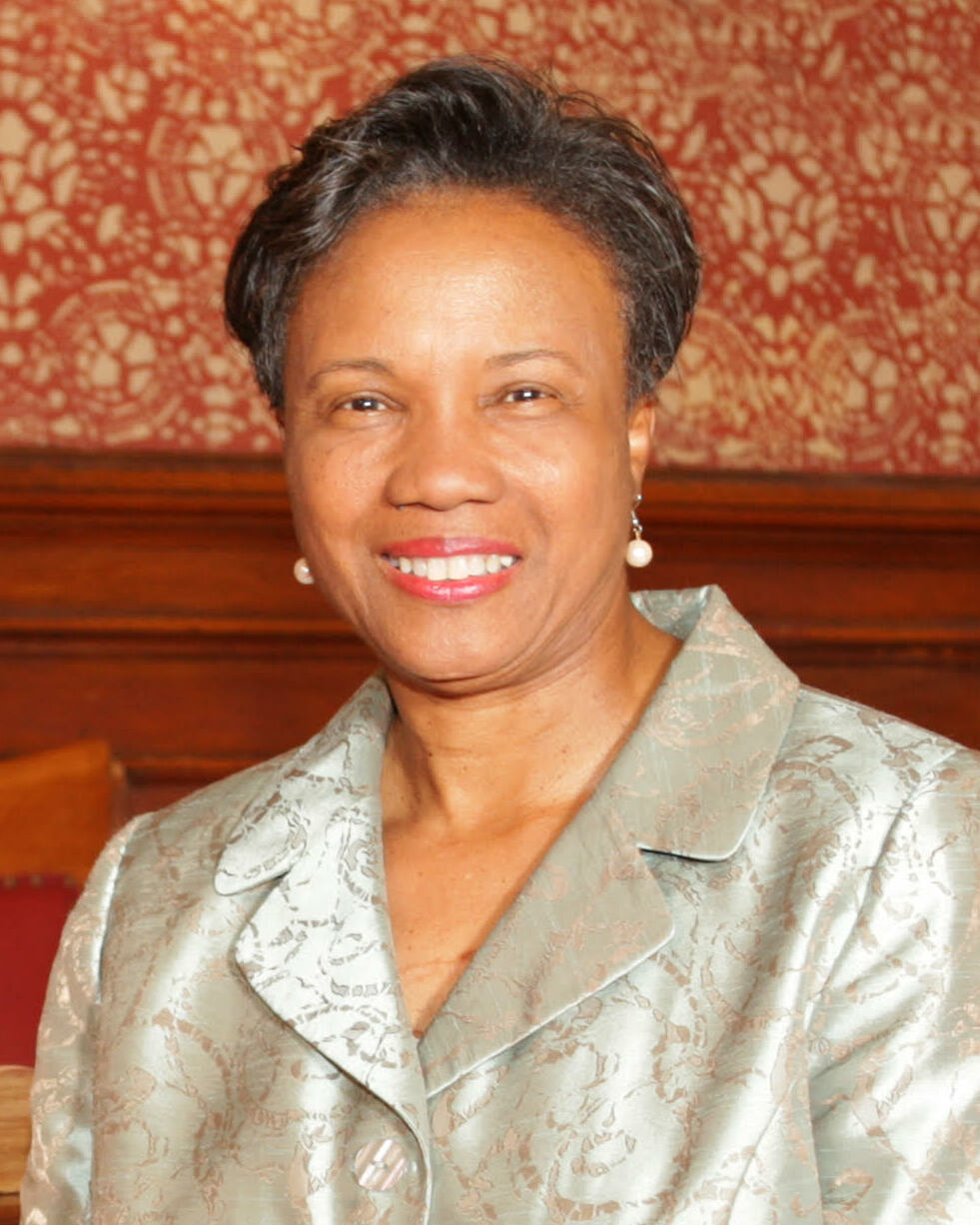
- Simmons in 2008

Mayor of Cambridge, Massachusetts
- In office January 1, 2024 – January 5, 2026
- Preceded by: Sumbul Siddiqui
- Succeeded by: Sumbul Siddiqui
- In office January 4, 2016 – January 1, 2018
- Preceded by: David P. Maher
- Succeeded by: Marc C. McGovern
- In office January 14, 2008 – February 22, 2010
- Preceded by: Kenneth Reeves
- Succeeded by: David P. Maher

Personal details
- Born: October 2, 1951 (age 75)
- Party: Democratic
- Spouse: Mattie Hayes (m. 2009)
- Education: University of Massachusetts Boston, Antioch College

E. Denise Simmons (born October 2, 1951) is an American politician who served as the mayor of Cambridge, Massachusetts from 2008 to 2009, again from 2016 to 2017, and a third mayoral term from 2024 to 2025. She was the first openly lesbian African-American mayor in the United States. Simmons has been on the Cambridge City Council continuously since 2002, now serving her twelfth consecutive term.

== Early life and education ==
Simmons was born on October 2, 1951. She grew up in Cambridge's Area 4 neighborhood and attended Cambridge schools. She received a Bachelor of Science degree in Sociology from the University of Massachusetts Boston, and a Master's degree in Psychotherapy from Antioch College.

In 1982, Simmons established her own business, the Cambridgeport Insurance Agency.

== Career ==
=== Public service ===
Simmons served as Executive Director of the Cambridge Civic Unity Committee in the 1980s. Among the work performed while in this role was her successful fight to increase the diversity within the Cambridge public school faculty.

In 1992, Simmons ran for and won a spot on the Cambridge School Committee. She quickly won praise from across Cambridge for her work ethic, and for her efforts to find ways to build consensus with her colleagues.

Simmons is a Justice of the Peace and notary public.

=== City Council member: 2001 to present ===
In 2001, Simmons ran for and won a seat on the Cambridge City Council. She immediately set out to make local government more accessible to a wider range of people, and through efforts such as holding "town hall" style meetings, Simmons worked to get more people involved in their own governance. Simmons—being Black, a woman, and a member of the LGBT community—worked to make sure that each of these constituencies was given a voice inside City Hall. Simmons was a member of the City Council when Cambridge City Hall became the first municipality, in 2004, to issue same-sex marriage licenses. She also promoted efforts to help local minority business owners network and establish themselves in Cambridge. Simmons also helped initiate community conversations about the role of race and class in contemporary Cambridge society.

==== First mayoral term ====
Her election to mayor of Cambridge by the Cambridge City Council on January 14, 2008, was unanimous. The previous mayor of Cambridge, Kenneth Reeves, was the first openly gay African-American mayor in the United States. As Cambridge mayor, Simmons served as head of the city's legislative body—while the non-elected city manager serves as the city's chief executive officer. Simmons took pains to create an open-door atmosphere to her constituents. She opened the "mayor's parlor" to the people of Cambridge, where she convened meetings on everything from environmental policy, to the coordination of the city's various social services providers, to a senior citizens' advisory group.

Simmons was mayor during the summer of 2009, during which time Cambridge was thrust into the international spotlight due to the arrest of Harvard University Professor Henry Louis Gates Jr. As a result of the attention this incident generated, Simmons was sought after as a spokesperson for the city, and she was careful to avoid inflaming an already volatile situation. Simmons was interviewed on ABC's Good Morning America, CBS's The Early Show, CNN's State Of The Union with John King, among several other national media outlets. Simmons won praise from her constituents for giving measured responses in public, as well as for her work to contain the situation behind the scenes. Simmons noted that she had a lengthy record of leading public discussions on how race and class impact contemporary Cambridge, and this work would continue long after the Professor Gates arrest faded from the headlines.

==== State Senate bid ====
In February 2010, Councillor Simmons announced that she was running for an open state Senate seat in the Middlesex, Suffolk and Essex district that was vacated by Anthony Galluccio. She came in third, behind Everett City Councilor Sal DiDomenico and Cambridge Attorney Tim Flaherty, in the April 13, 2010 primary. She released a statement to the press that said, in part: "Despite coming up a little short at the end, this campaign was still a winning experience for me. I have had a tremendous opportunity to get to meet so many people, to learn more about the issues impacting the people in this district, and to make many new friends in Cambridge and beyond. The volunteers that made phone calls and knocked on doors every day were phenomenal, and their dedication and enthusiasm for civic engagement energized me every day." Having lost the primary, Councillor Simmons returned her attention to her duties on the Cambridge City Council.

==== 2012–present ====
In the 2012–2013 term, she served as Vice Mayor of Cambridge.

Simmons was again elected Mayor on January 4, 2016.

On November 5, 2019, Simmons was elected to her 10th term on the Cambridge City Council.

== Personal ==
Simmons is also a photo archivist and family historian and has facilitated workshops for public and private organizations both nationally and locally—including for the Cambridge Public Schools. Simmons has received numerous awards and commendations for her work in the community.

== See also ==
- Cambridge, Massachusetts municipal election, 2013
- List of first African-American mayors
- List of mayors of Cambridge, Massachusetts
- List of the first LGBT holders of political offices

Political offices
Preceded by Kenneth Reeves	Mayor of Cambridge, Massachusetts; 2008–2009	Succeeded by David P. Maher
Preceded by David P. Maher	Mayor of Cambridge, Massachusetts; 2016–2017	Succeeded by Marc C. McGovern
Preceded by Sumbul Siddiqui	Mayor of Cambridge, Massachusetts; 2024–present	Succeeded by Incumbent
