= Henry Gilmore =

American politician

Henry H. Gilmore

Mayor of Cambridge, Massachusetts
- In office January 1889 – January 1891
- Preceded by: William Russell
- Succeeded by: Alpheus B. Alger

Member of the Massachusetts State Senate Third Middlesex District

Member of the Cambridge, Massachusetts Board of Aldermen Ward II
- In office 1880–1881

Member of the Cambridge, Massachusetts Common Council Ward II
- In office 1870–1870

Member of the Medford, Massachusetts Board of Selectmen
- In office 1866–1866

Assessor of the Town of Medford, Massachusetts
- In office 1862–1862
- In office 1866–1866

Personal details
- Born: August 31, 1832 Warner, New Hampshire
- Died: December 24, 1891 Pasadena, California
- Party: Democratic
- Spouse: Sarah D. Todd

Henry H. Gilmore (August 31, 1832 – December 24, 1891) was a Massachusetts businessman and politician who served on the Board of Selectmen of the Town of Medford, Massachusetts, and as the Mayor of The City of Cambridge, Massachusetts.

== Early life ==
Gilmore was born in Warner, New Hampshire, on August 31, 1832, to Mitchel and Czarina (Currier) Gilmore. He married Sarah D. Todd in Charlestown, Massachusetts on May 19, 1858.

== Public Offices ==
Gilmore served on various town and city offices in Medford, Massachusetts, and Cambridge, Massachusetts. In Medford, Massachusetts he was a member of the Board of Selectmen, Overseer of the Poor, Highway Surveyor and Assessor. In Cambridge he was a member of the Common Council and Board of Aldermen. Gilmore also represented Cambridge and the Third Middlesex District in the Massachusetts State Senate. In 1885 Gilmore was the Democratic party nominee for the office of Lieutenant Governor of Massachusetts

== Notes ==
Political offices
| Preceded by William Russell | Mayor of Cambridge, Massachusetts; January 1889 – January 1891 | Succeeded by Alpheus B. Alger |
