= Isaac Bradford =

American politician

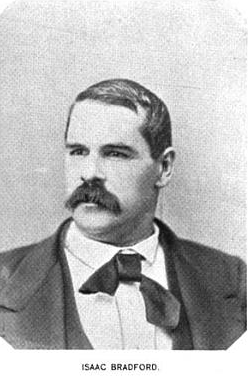

17th Mayor of Cambridge, Massachusetts
- In office January, 1873 – January, 1877
- Preceded by: Henry Oscar Houghton
- Succeeded by: Frank Augustus Allen

Personal details
- Born: November 15, 1834 Boston, Massachusetts, US
- Died: December 19, 1898 (aged 64) Cambridge, Massachusetts, US
- Party: Democratic
- Spouse: Jane Ann Davis
- Children: 2
- Occupation: Mathematician

Isaac Bradford (November 15, 1834 – December 19, 1898) was a Massachusetts mathematician and politician who served as the seventeenth Mayor of Cambridge, Massachusetts.

== Personal life ==
Bradford was born to Isaac Bradford and Sarah (Beckford) Bradford in Boston on November 15, 1834. He married Jane Ann (Hutchings) Davis in Medford, Massachusetts on April 30, 1862. They had two children, Ellen Hutchings and Isaac Bradford Jr.

== Notes ==
Political offices
| Preceded by Henry Oscar Houghton | 17th Mayor of Cambridge, Massachusetts; January, 1873 – January, 1877 | Succeeded by Frank Augustus Allen |
