= James D. Green =

American politician (1798–1882)

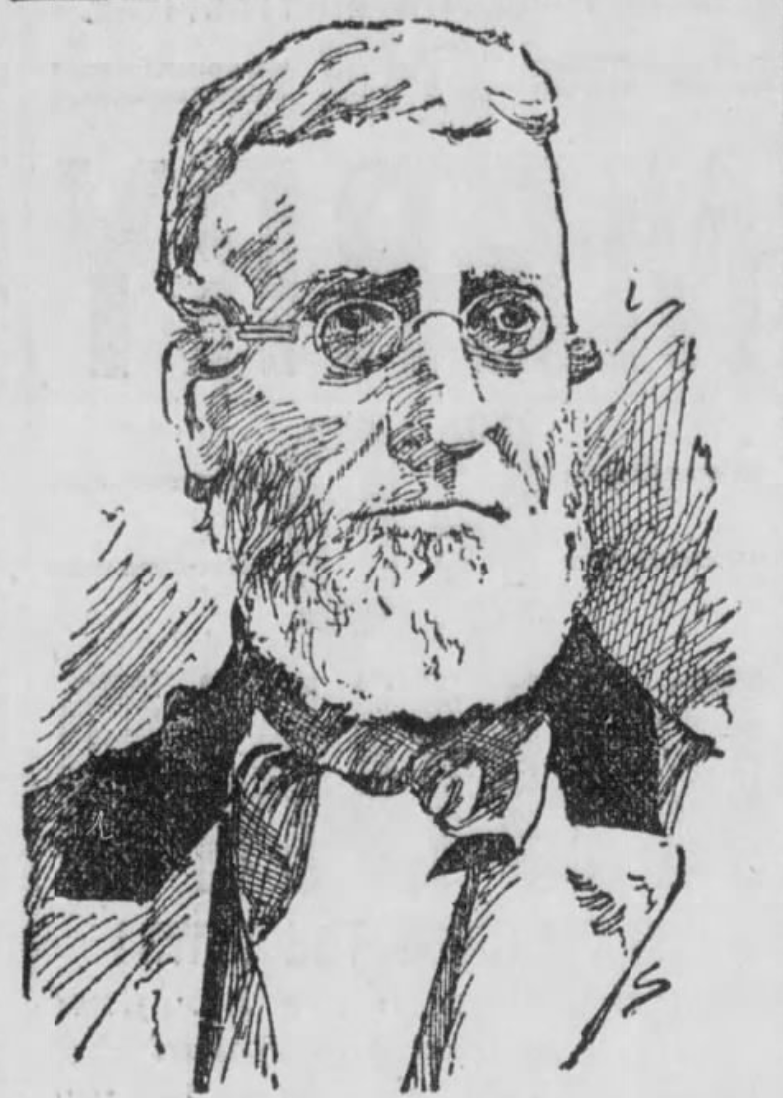

8th Mayor of Cambridge, Massachusetts
- In office January 1860 – July 24, 1861
- Preceded by: John Sargent
- Succeeded by: Charles Theodore Russell

4th Mayor of Cambridge, Massachusetts
- In office April 1851 – April 1853
- Preceded by: George Stevens
- Succeeded by: Abraham Edwards

1st Mayor of Cambridge, Massachusetts
- In office May 1846 – April 1848
- Preceded by: Board of Selectmen
- Succeeded by: Sidney Willard

Member of the Board of Selectmen of Cambridge, Massachusetts
- In office 1845–1845

Personal details
- Born: September 8, 1798 Malden, Massachusetts
- Died: August 18, 1882 (aged 83) Cambridge, Massachusetts
- Education: Harvard College
- Occupation: Minister

James Diman Green (September 8, 1798 – August 18, 1882) was a Massachusetts politician who served as a Member of the Massachusetts House of Representatives, a member of the Board of Selectmen and the first, fourth and eighth Mayor of Cambridge, Massachusetts.

Political offices
| Preceded by Board of Selectmen | 1st Mayor of Cambridge, Massachusetts; May 1846 – April 1848 | Succeeded by Sidney Willard |
| Preceded by George Stevens | 4th Mayor of Cambridge, Massachusetts; April 1853 – April 1854 | Succeeded by Abraham Edwards |
| Preceded by John Sargent | 8th Mayor of Cambridge, Massachusetts; January 1860 – July 24, 1861 | Succeeded by Charles Theodore Russell |
| Preceded by | Member of the Board of Selectmen of Cambridge, Massachusetts; 1845–1845 | Succeeded by |
