= Timothy W. Good =

Mayor of Cambridge, Massachusetts from 1914–1916

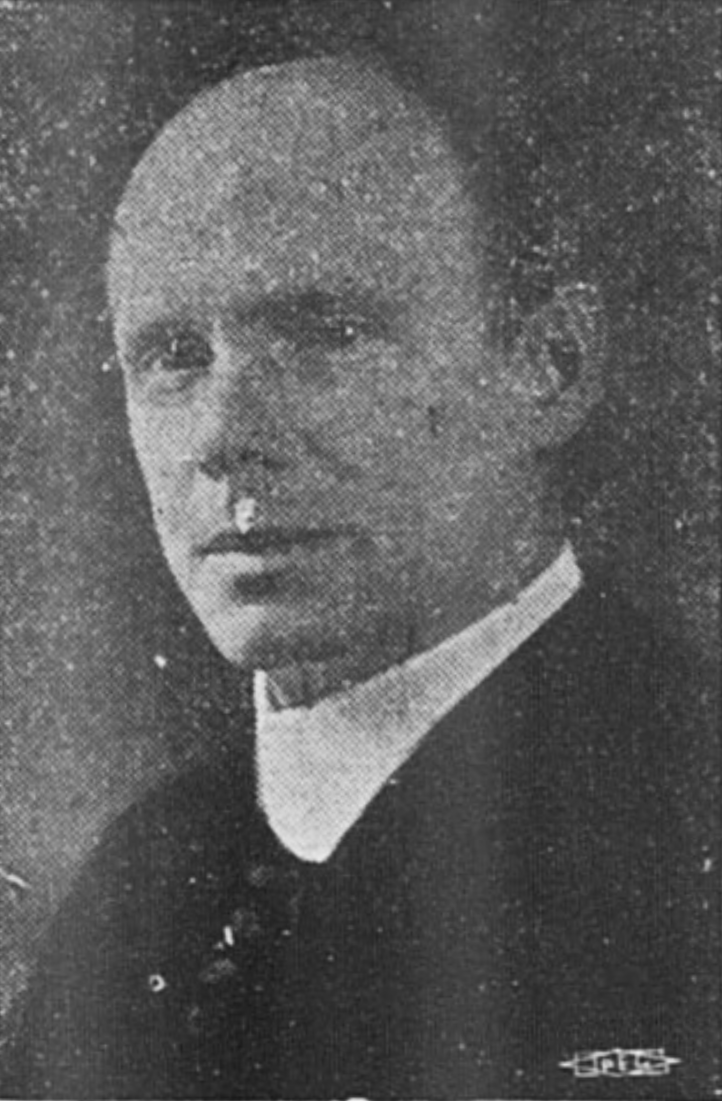

35th Mayor of Cambridge, Massachusetts
- In office April 1914 – January 1916
- Preceded by: J. Edward Barry
- Succeeded by: Wendell D. Rockwood

Personal details
- Born: 1872
- Died: April 24, 1951 (aged 78–79) Cambridge, Massachusetts
- Party: Democratic Party

Timothy W. Good (1872 – April 24, 1951) was mayor of Cambridge, Massachusetts from April 1914- January 1916. He was educated in the public schools of Cambridge, and once he graduated, he started working as a banker. His positions include director of the Guarantee Trust Co. of Cambridge, trustee of Hibernia Savings Bank, director of the Cambridge Realty Co, and a vice president of Manufacturers National of Cambridge. In 1899, he started his political career by becoming a member of the Common Council of Cambridge. Good then went on to become the president of the Board of Aldermen in 1903, and he was the Democratic Party candidate for mayor of Cambridge, elected in 1914.
