= John D. Lynch =

American politician

Mayor of Cambridge, Massachusetts
- In office 1946–1947
- Preceded by: John H. Corcoran
- Succeeded by: Michael Neville
- In office 1936–1938
- Preceded by: Richard M. Russell
- Succeeded by: John W. Lyons

Personal details
- Born: 1882 or 1883
- Died: December 10, 1963 (aged 80) Cambridge, Massachusetts
- Party: Democratic
- Education: Massachusetts College of Pharmacy
- Occupation: Druggist

John D. Lynch (1882/1883 – December 10, 1963) was an American politician who served as Mayor of Cambridge, Massachusetts.

== Early life ==
Lynch was born in Cambridge. At the age of 14 he began working as a pharmacy helper to help support his family. He graduated from the Massachusetts College of Pharmacy. When he was 22 he acquired his first pharmacy. By 1917 he owned four stores. He sold three of them after he was drafted into the United States Army during World War I. Lynch was also a founding officer and later president of the North Cambridge Cooperative Bank and the University Trust Co.

== Political career ==
From 1930 to 1934, Lynch was a member of the Cambridge school committee. He made his first bid for Mayor in 1933, but lost to incumbent Richard M. Russell 19,416 to 16,523. In 1955 he defeated city council president John W. Lyons by 267 votes in the closest election in city history. Lyons went on to defeat Lynch in 1937 by a margin of 311 votes. In 1938, Lynch was awarded $16,000 in a slander case against Lyons and his former campaign manager, James F. Mahoney. The case was the first in Massachusetts to use phonographic records as evidence.

In 1941, Lynch was elected to the Cambridge city council. He ran as a supporter of the city manager form of government. In 1946, Lynch was appointed Mayor of Cambridge by the city council on the 309th ballot. In 1948 he was an unsuccessful candidate for the Democratic nomination for the United States Senate seat held by Leverett Saltonstall. In 1950, he called for local police "to root out the Communists," and he called anyone opposed to the City Council's measures "certainly a friend of the Communists." Lynch was defeated for reelection to the city council in 1961. He died on December 10, 1963, at the age of 80.

His nephew, Thomas Danehy, went on to serve on the Cambridge City Council and as mayor as well.
