= Zebina L. Raymond =

American politician

Mayor of Cambridge, Massachusetts
- In office January 1864 – January 1865
- Preceded by: George C. Richardson
- Succeeded by: J. Warren Merrill

Mayor of Cambridge, Massachusetts
- In office January 1855 – January 1856
- Preceded by: Abraham Edwards
- Succeeded by: John Sargent

Member of the Massachusetts State Senate County of Middlesex District
- In office January 1855 – January 1856
- Preceded by: David K. Hitchcock
- Succeeded by: Benjamin H. Brown

Personal details
- Born: August 23, 1804 Shutesbury, Massachusetts
- Died: January 5, 1872
- Spouse(s): Rhoda C. Hildreth, b. April 20, 1805; d. July 16, 1875.
- Children: Edward Franklin, Charles Lewis, Ellen Augusta, William Henry, Albert Winthrop

Zebina L. Raymond (August 23, 1804 – January 5, 1872) was a Massachusetts politician who served as a member of the Massachusetts State Senate and as the 6th and 11th Mayor of Cambridge, Massachusetts.

Raymond was born to Asa and Huldah (Rice) Raymond in Shutesbury, Massachusetts on August 23, 1804. Raymond married Rhoda C. Hildreth on July 5, 1828.

== Notes ==
Political offices
Preceded by Abraham Edwards	Mayor of Cambridge, Massachusetts; January 1855 - January 1856	Succeeded by John Sargent
Preceded by George C. Richardson	Mayor of Cambridge, Massachusetts; January 1864 - January 1865	Succeeded by J. Warren Merrill
