= George C. Richardson =

American politician (1808–1886)

George Carter Richardson

Mayor of Cambridge, Massachusetts
- In office July 31, 1863 – January 1864
- Preceded by: Charles Theodore Russell
- Succeeded by: Zebina L. Raymond

Personal details
- Born: April 27, 1808 Royalston, Massachusetts
- Died: May 20, 1886 (aged 78) Boston, Massachusetts
- Spouse(s): Susan Gore Moore; Ellen Gregory
- Children: (With Susan Gore Moore) George Eliot; Henry Augustus; Charles Howard; Edward. (With Ellen Gregory) Arthur Gregory
- Occupation: Politician

George Carter Richardson (April 27, 1808 – May 20, 1886) was a Massachusetts politician who served as the Mayor of Cambridge, Massachusetts.

== Biography ==
George was born on April 27, 1808 in Royalston, Massachusetts to Jane Brown and Thomas Richardson. He was one of seven children. He married Susan Gore Moore on February 2, 1832, and stayed with her until her death on November 18, 1845. After Susan's death, he married Ellen Gregory on November 5, 1850. He had four children in his first marriage to Susan, and one with Ellen. He died in Boston, Massachusetts on May 20, 1886.

Political offices
Preceded by Charles Theodore Russell	Mayor of Cambridge, Massachusetts; January 1863 - January 1864	Succeeded by Zebina L. Raymond
