= George Stevens (1803–1894) =

American organ builder and politician (1803–1894)

Mayor of Cambridge, Massachusetts
- In office April 1851 – April 1853
- Preceded by: Sidney Willard
- Succeeded by: James D. Green

Personal details
- Born: April 22, 1803 Norway, Maine, USA
- Died: August 15, 1894 (aged 91) East Cambridge, Massachusetts, USA
- Resting place: Mount Auburn Cemetery
- Occupation: Pipe organ manufacturer

George Stevens (April 22, 1803 – August 15, 1894) was an American manufacturer and politician who served as the third Mayor of Cambridge, Massachusetts.

== Personal life ==
Stevens was born to Nathaniel and Rebecca (Cobb) Stevens in Norway, Maine, on April 22, 1803. He had one brother, William whom he worked with in the pipe organ industry.

== Professional life ==
Stevens and his brother William worked as apprentices for pipe organ manufacturer William Goodrich. Stevens took over Goodrich's firm and for two years starting in 1833, Stevens was a proprietor with William Gayetty of Stevens & Gayetty in East Cambridge, Massachusetts, however for most of his career, Stevens worked on his own. Stevens built over eight hundred pipe organs, he supplied many small churches with one- and two-manual organs.

Political offices
Preceded by Sidney Willard	Mayor of Cambridge, Massachusetts; April 1851 – April 1853	Succeeded by James D. Green
