= Alvin F. Sortwell =

American politician

Alvin Foye Sortwell
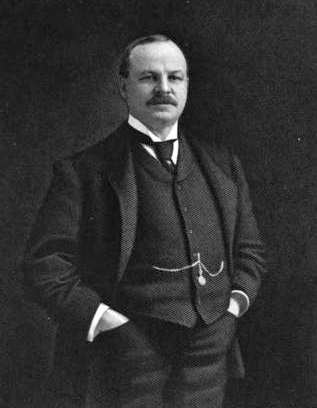

26th Mayor of Cambridge, Massachusetts
- In office January 1897 – January 1899
- Preceded by: William Bancroft
- Succeeded by: Edgar R. Champlin

Member of the Board of Aldermen of Cambridge, Massachusetts
- In office January 1889 – January 1890

President of the Common Council of Cambridge, Massachusetts
- In office 1888–1888

Member of the Common Council of Cambridge, Massachusetts
- In office 1886–1888

Member of the Common Council of Cambridge, Massachusetts
- In office 1879–1879

Personal details
- Born: July 21, 1854 Boston, Massachusetts, US
- Died: March 21, 1910 Cambridge, Massachusetts, US
- Spouse: Gertrude Winship Dailey
- Children: 6
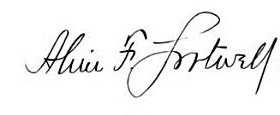
- Signature

Alvin Foye Sortwell (July 21, 1854 – March 21, 1910) was a Massachusetts politician who served as the twenty-sixth Mayor of Cambridge, Massachusetts.

Sortwell was born to Daniel Robinson Sortwell and Sophia Augusta (Foye) Sortwell in Boston, Massachusetts, on July 21, 1854. On December 31, 1879, Sortwell married Gertrude Winship Dailey, they had six children, Clara, Frances Augusta, Daniel Richard, Marion, Edward Carter and Alvin Foye Sortwell. Edward Carter Sortwell joined the American Ambulance Field Service, Edward died in Salonika, Greece in November 1916 the result of being struck by a staff car while crossing a darkened alleyway.

== Notes ==
Political offices
Preceded by William Bancroft	26th Mayor of Cambridge, Massachusetts; January 1897 – January 1899	Succeeded by Edgar R. Champlin
Preceded by	President of the Common Council of Cambridge, Massachusetts; 1888–1888	Succeeded by
