= Samuel L. Montague =

American politician

Samuel Leland Montague
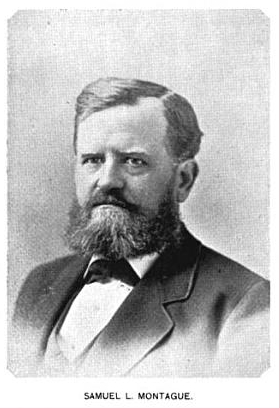

Mayor of Cambridge, Massachusetts
- In office January 1878 – January 1880
- Preceded by: Frank Augustus Allen
- Succeeded by: James Morris Whiton Hall

Member of the Board of Aldermen of Cambridge, Massachusetts
- In office 1875–1876

Member of the Common Council of Cambridge, Massachusetts
- In office 1873–1874

Personal details
- Born: May 4, 1829 Montague, Massachusetts
- Died: January 16, 1869 Cambridge, Massachusetts
- Party: Republican
- Spouse(s): Annie Maria Burchsted, m. December 23, 1852, d. September 12, 1854; Mary Elizabeth Burchsted, m. May 4, 1856.
- Children: Annie Sybil Montague; Charles Hibbard Montague; Mary Noyes Montague.

Samuel Leland Montague (May 4, 1829 – January 16, 1869) was a Massachusetts politician who served on the Common Council, the Board of Aldermen and as the Mayor of Cambridge, Massachusetts.

== Personal life ==
Montague was born in Montague, Massachusetts on May 4, 1829, to Simeon and Sybil (Leland) Montague. He married Ann Maria Bucksted on December 23, 1853, who died less than a year later on September 12, 1854. After her death, he married Mary Elizabeth Bucksted. They had two children, Charles H. and Annie S. Montague.

== Notes ==
Political offices
Preceded by Frank Augustus Allen	Mayor of Cambridge, Massachusetts; January 1878 - January 1880	Succeeded by James Morris Whiton Hall
