= American International Corporation =

American International Corporation was an American investment trust founded in 1915 by Frank Vanderlip; Willard Straight was the key operational leader. Its board and stockholders included a wide range of leading American financiers and industrialists.

== History ==
With an initial capitalization of 50 million dollars and located at 120 Broadway in Manhattan, its goals were to invest in foreign companies and projects, especially in China & Russia during France and the United Kingdom's fiscal distress caused by World War I. The company's initial board of directors included Vanderlip, Otto Hermann Kahn, Robert Dollar, Joseph Peter Grace Sr., Albert H. Wiggin, James A. Stillman, J. Ogden Armour, and Charles H. Sabin. According to AIC president Harry A. Arthur, Vanderlip and Charles A. Stone were the "leading spirits" of the corporation.

Its ambitious plans were stymied by opposition from the Wilson administration and the focus of attention on supporting the war effort. Russia fell into civil war and China was chaotic after the death of its leader in 1916. Willard Straight died and Vanderlip was fired. Despite years of planning, construction work was never begun on the Corporation's elaborate projects in Russia and China. The Corporation did set up a network of branch offices for National City. Its international investments were not profitable and it switched to domestic investment. From 1918 to 1921, AIC subsidiary American International Shipbuilding Company built 122 ships for the U. S. government at its shipyard on Hog Island. Between 1915 and 1935, American International Corporation lost $36 million of its original $50 million capitalization due to the Great Depression.

From 1923 to 1933, Matthew C. Brush served as the president of American International Corporation. During this time, AIC was one of the largest investment trusts in the world.

In 1932, Adams Express began acquiring shares on the open market and the following year, Charles Hayden and Steele Mitchell, two of representatives of Hayden, Stone & Co., which controlled Adams Express, were elected to American International Corporation's board of directors. By 1937, Adams Express and Hayden, Stone & Co. had controlling interest of American International Corporation. In 1969, AIC was merged into Adams Express.

== Notable people ==
- Evelyn Aldrich, American businesswoman and employee (1917), New York City
