= Sumbul Siddiqui =

American lawyer and politician (born 1988)

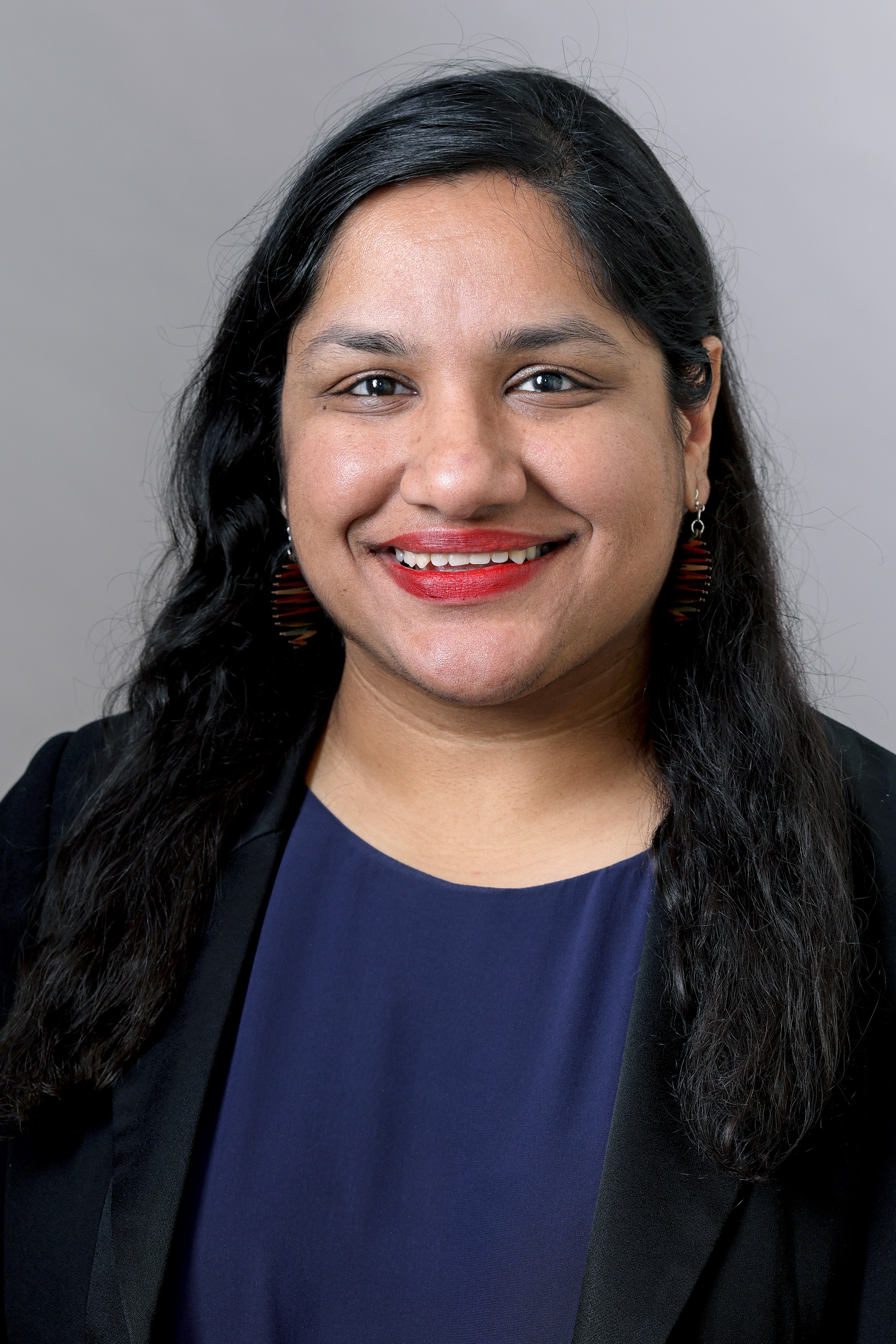
- Siddiqui in 2021

Mayor of Cambridge
- Incumbent
- Assumed office January 5, 2026
- Preceded by: E. Denise Simmons
- In office January 6, 2020 – January 1, 2024
- Preceded by: Marc McGovern
- Succeeded by: E. Denise Simmons

Personal details
- Born: 1988 (age 37–38) Karachi, Sindh, Pakistan
- Party: Democratic
- Education: Brown University (BA); Northwestern University (JD)

Sumbul Siddiqui (born 1988) is an American lawyer and politician who served as the 77th mayor of Cambridge, Massachusetts. Siddiqui was elected mayor in 2020 by the Cambridge City Council, after serving in the body for three years. She succeeded Marc C. McGovern in January 2020, becoming the first Muslim mayor in Massachusetts history.

== Early life ==
Siddiqui was born in Karachi, Pakistan in 1988. She immigrated to the United States from Pakistan when she was two years old, with her parents and twin brother. Her family moved to Cambridge after receiving a lottery spot in Cambridge's affordable housing system. Siddiqui was raised in Rindge Towers in North Cambridge and Roosevelt Towers in East Cambridge. She attended schools in the Cambridge Public School District and graduated from Cambridge Rindge and Latin School in 2006, where she was also student body president. Siddiqui received a 2006 Peace and Justice Award from the Cambridge Peace Commission. Siddiqui also co-founded the Cambridge Youth Council in 2002, which still exists in the city today and has led to many initiatives by student activists.

Siddiqui attended Brown University, where she was involved in the university's South Asian Students Association. She graduated from Brown in 2010 with a Bachelor of Arts in public policy and American institutions. Siddiqui later attended the Northwestern University Pritzker School of Law, graduating in 2014 with a JD.

Siddiqui then joined Northeast Legal Aid, where she helped lead the Community Development and Entrepreneurship practice. Siddiqui provided free legal services to local entrepreneurs and small businesses in Lowell, Lawrence, and Lynn. Siddiqui also offered office hours at community organizations to offer brief advice related to common legal issues for small businesses.

== Cambridge City Councillor (2018–2019) ==
As a City Councilor, she chaired the Mayor's Task Force on Tenant Displacement.

In October 2018, Councillor Siddiqui sponsored numerous community events, including Cambridge Digs DEEP, a series of Citywide forums on racial justice.

In 2018 and 2019, she hosted an annual Cambridge Community Iftar during the month of Ramadan.

In September 2019, Councillor Siddiqui was the deciding vote in a controversial project to develop the East Cambridge Courthouse. She advocated for more affordable housing in the deal.

== Mayor of Cambridge ==
=== First term (2020–2021) ===
Sumbul Siddiqui topped the ballot in the 2019 election. Siddiqui was elected Mayor on January 6, 2020, with a unanimous vote.

During her tenure, Sumbul Siddiqui, served as the Mayor of Cambridge for four years, spearheading a range of initiatives aimed at addressing critical issues affecting the community.

In February 2020, she advocated for Halal meat in all Cambridge Public Schools. Informed by Muslim families, Mayor Siddiqui and School Committee Vice-chair Manikka Bowman advocated to make meals in Cambridge Public Schools as inclusive as possible, this served both a nutritional benefit to students who cannot rely on a daily packed lunch from home, as well as promoted opportunities for social learning through sharing meals with classmates.

In March 2020, Siddiqui responded to the COVID-19 Pandemic, by launching the Mayor's Disaster Relief Fund, which raised over $5 million to provide assistance to individuals, small businesses, and nonprofit organizations. Additionally, she played a pivotal role in the Cambridge Pandemic Collaborative, facilitating city-wide COVID-19 testing and organizing neighborhood vaccine drives to ensure widespread access to essential healthcare services.

In July 2020, she worked with the Cambridge Public Library to eliminate library fines that disproportionately affect low-income residents and families of color.

In August 2020, Siddiqui, as the Chair of the School Committee worked with the Cambridge Public Schools Superintendent Kenneth Salim to reopen schools in phases. Students started going back to school virtually in September 2020 and eligible students whose families choose to opt-in began in-person learning four days a week in October 2020. She implemented several testing options throughout the city. All school staff working in-person were provided with free COVID-19 testing twice per week through a partnership with the Broad Institute of MIT and Harvard. In addition to surveillance testing of onsite staff, easily accessible testing was made available in all buildings on an ongoing basis for staff and students who become ill with COVID-like symptoms during the school day.

In September 2020, she spearheaded the Early College program which provides Cambridge Rindge and Latin Students the opportunity to fulfill high school and college credits for free at Lesley University, leading to students graduating high school with college credits.

In October 2020, she sponsored the City of Cambridge Tenants Rights and Resources Ordinance, ensuring that housing information is widely disseminated and that best practices are implemented throughout tenancies to ensure housing stability for the city's residents.

In February 2021, Siddiqui advocated redesigning a Cambridge specific “I Voted” sticker with the help of Cambridge Rindge and Latin students.

In May 2021, she also appointed an ad hoc working group to address ongoing issues of homelessness in Cambridge, and inform the city's Homeless Strategy moving forward, including advocating for non-congregate shelters.

In April 2021, Siddiqui provided nearly 700 Iftar meals to hundreds of Cambridge families.

In June 2021, she launched a pilot program with Elevate Youth Partnership, connecting our 4th, 5th, and 6th-grade students with youth instructors and mentors from their own communities to participate in outdoor activities at local parks.

In June 2021, she helped create a free summer program called RECESS that provides students with STEAM focus activities and outdoor play. She supported a tree protection ordinance intended to slow tree destruction by putting their preservation front and center.

In September 2021, Siddiqui started Cambridge RISE, one of the first guaranteed income pilots in the country, which provided130 single caretakers $500 monthly over 18 months.

In September 2021, she worked to establish a program partnering the city with East Cambridge Savings Bank to open a savings account with $50 for every kindergartener this fall along with financial literacy classes.

In October 2021, Siddiqui preserved and expanded affordable housing options in Cambridge. This included the preservation of over 500 affordable units in the Fresh Pond Apartments and the expansion of eligibility criteria for the Homebridge program to 120% of the area median income and ensuring that home ownership is a reality for people across the income spectrum.

In December 2021, she started a gift card drive that collected thousands of dollars in gift cards to be distributed to the community.

=== Second term (2022–2023) ===
In January 2022, she partnered with Lesley University and Cambridge Public Schools to launch an Early College pilot.

In March 2022, Siddiqui hosted a Women's History Month art contest and collected art from residents.

In April 2022, Siddiqui hosted an Iftar that brought together hundreds of people.

Siddiqui organized the second annual Bike Bonanza and had residents bike in protected bike lanes around the city and stop by to support local business along the way. She always worked with the Department of Public Works and planted a cherry blossom tree at the Baldwin School with the 1st graders. Siddiqui also appointed a climate crisis working group that provided a report that highlights climate actions and goals.

In May 2022, she hosted a Yoga on the Lawn day in honor of Mental Health Awareness Month. Mayor Siddiqui also provided five people with a year-subscription of Headspace.

In June 2022, she created a Universal Pre-K Ad-Hoc consisting of City staff, School Committee Members, City Councillors and staff from the Office of Early Childhood Education to push forward the Cambridge Preschool Program (CPP). CPP is a publicly funded program that will provide free school-day, school-year preschool to every 4-year-old and some 3-year-olds living in Cambridge by September 2024.

In June 2022, she sponsored the first ever Juneteenth Parade in collaboration with the Cambridge Families of Color Coalition.

In October 2022, she hosted a citywide Diwali event that featured performances from local artists.

In December 2022, she raised $50,000 in gift cards from the community and local businesses to distribute to residents. She also advocated to provide a $75 gift card to anyone that got their COVID booster.

In February 2023, Siddiqui celebrated International Mother Language Day by collecting 65 poems in different languages from Cambridge residents. She also collected 1,045 donated wool socks for homeless residents that were distributed through CASPAR. She also hosted a free ice skate at the Canal District rink for all residents.

In March 2023, Siddiqui hosted an Iftar that brought together almost 1,000 people.

In March 2023, Siddiqui also hosted a Women's History Month themed trivia night and an art contest that received 45 submissions. She also hosted a women's trivia month at Lamplighter.

In April 2023, Siddiqui organized the second annual Bike Bonanza and had 150 residents bike in protected bike lanes around the city and stop by to support local business along the way. She also worked with the Department of Public Works to plant two trees at the Amigos School and Cambridgeport School.

In May 2023, Siddiqui worked with the student School Committee representatives to host an Ice Cream Social voter registration event.

In May 2023, Siddiqui also joined Mayors from Somerville, Lynn, and Salem to sign the Commonwealth Development Compact, committing to historic DEI evaluation criteria in public and private real estate development projects. The City of Cambridge issued an RFP for a development of a city-owned parking lot.

In June 2023, following the end of the Cambridge RISE pilot, she launched Rise Up Cambridge, one of the first and largest guaranteed income programs in the country to provide any family with a dependent under the age of 21 and earning 250% below the Federal Poverty Line with $500 monthly for 18 months. This program provided almost 2,000 families with payments.

In June 2023, she launched Cambridge Promise Pilot, which provides eligible students with free tuition to Bunker Hill Community College and a college success coach.

In August 2023, Siddiqui was featured in “Mayor’s Desk” by Anthony Flint, being one of 25 mayors from across the globe to be featured in the book.

In December 2023, she raised $50,000 in gift cards from the community and local businesses to distribute to residents. She also organized a toy drive that collected 500 toys for families in the Cambridge Public Schools. She also hosted a free skate day for all residents in Cambridge.

==== Toxic workplace accusations ====
"Eight women who have worked for Siddiqui since 2017 allege the mayor created a toxic work environment" according to an October 16, 2023 article in the Boston Globe. Reporter, Diti Kohli, notes that in "interviews over the last six months, they said Siddiqui undermined their self-esteem and jeopardized their future job prospects, behavior they say prompted people to leave her employment under difficult circumstances. The aides — half of whom are women of color, and most of whom are no longer directly involved in Cambridge politics — described experiences including the mayor berating them for small mistakes such as typos, commenting on their bodies, and denigrating them to other colleagues. Four of the employees also alleged Siddiqui retaliated against them when they accepted new jobs or sought to leave her office."

Two of the employees on the record had run against Siddiqui in the past or were running against her at the time of the election.The six other women spoke anonymously. Siddiqui responded to these allegations of workplace mistreatment “are [either] simply not true or mischaracterizations.“While I acknowledge that I have high standards for my staff, I am continually open to learning how to be a better supervisor. I hold the ideals of respect and equity high,” Siddiqui said. “This work can be demanding and requires flexibility,” Siddiqui acknowledged, but said she always strives “to treat everyone with respect.” Some who have worked with Siddiqui over the years had only positive things to say about the mayor. They praised her as a barrier breaker and role model for young women of color.

== Awards ==
- 2018: Outstanding Achievement Award South Asian Bar Association
- 2020: NAACP award
- 2021: Women's Bar Association of Massachusetts Emerging Women Leaders in the Law award
- 2021: South Asian Bar Association 2021 Member of the Year
- 2021: Northwestern Law Emerging Leader Award
- 2021: Margaret Fuller House Gala award
- 2021: Greater Boston Labor Council Labor Champion award.
- 2022: Massachusetts Association of School Committees, Inc award in recognition of work as Chair of Cambridge School Committee
- 2023: American Pakistan Foundation Rising Star
- 2023: UMASS Distinguished Fellow
- 2024: NAACP Leadership Award

== Electoral history ==
2017 Cambridge City Council Results Count 1 - Tally of 1st Place Votes
Candidate	Results
Simmons, E. Denise	2616
Siddiqui, Sumbul	2532
McGovern, Marc C.	1880
Devereux, Jan	1699
Toomey Jr., Timothy J.	1619
Zondervan, Quinton Y.	1565
Mallon, Allanna	1329
Carlone, Dennis J.	1176
Kelley, Craig A.	1092

2019 Cambridge City Council Results Count 1 - Tally of 1st Place Votes
Candidate	Results
Siddiqui, Sumbul	2516
Simmons, E. Denise	2007
Toomey Jr., Timothy J.	1729
Nolan, Patricia M.	1685
McGovern, Marc C.	1621
Carlone, Dennis J.	1479
Zondervan, Quinton Y.	1382
Sobrinho-Wheeler, Jivan	1321
Mallon, Alanna M.	1256

2021 Cambridge City Council Results Count 1 - Tally of 1st Place Votes
Candidate	Results
Siddiqui, Sumbul	4124
Nolan, Patricia M.	1971
Simmons, E. Denise	1764
Toner, Paul F.	1703
McGovern, Marc C.	1539
Carlone, Dennis J.	1493
Azeem, Burhan	1379
Zondervan, Quinton Y.	1295
Mallon, Alanna M.	1220

2023 Cambridge City Council Results Count 1 - Tally of 1st Place Votes
Candidate	Results
Siddiqui, Sumbul	3353
Burhan, Azeem	2250
Nolan, Patricia	2156
McGovern, Marc C.	2064
Toner, Paul F.	1987
Sobrinho-Wheeler, Jivan G.	1486
E. Denise Simmons	1450
Wilson, Ayesha	1168
Pickett, Joan	932

Political offices
Preceded by Marc C. McGovern	Mayor of Cambridge, Massachusetts; 2020–2024	Succeeded by E. Denise Simmons
