= Henrietta Davis (politician) =

American politician

Mayor of Cambridge, Massachusetts
- In office 2012–2013
- Preceded by: David P. Maher
- Succeeded by: David P. Maher

Personal details
- Education: University of Rochester, Boston College, Harvard University

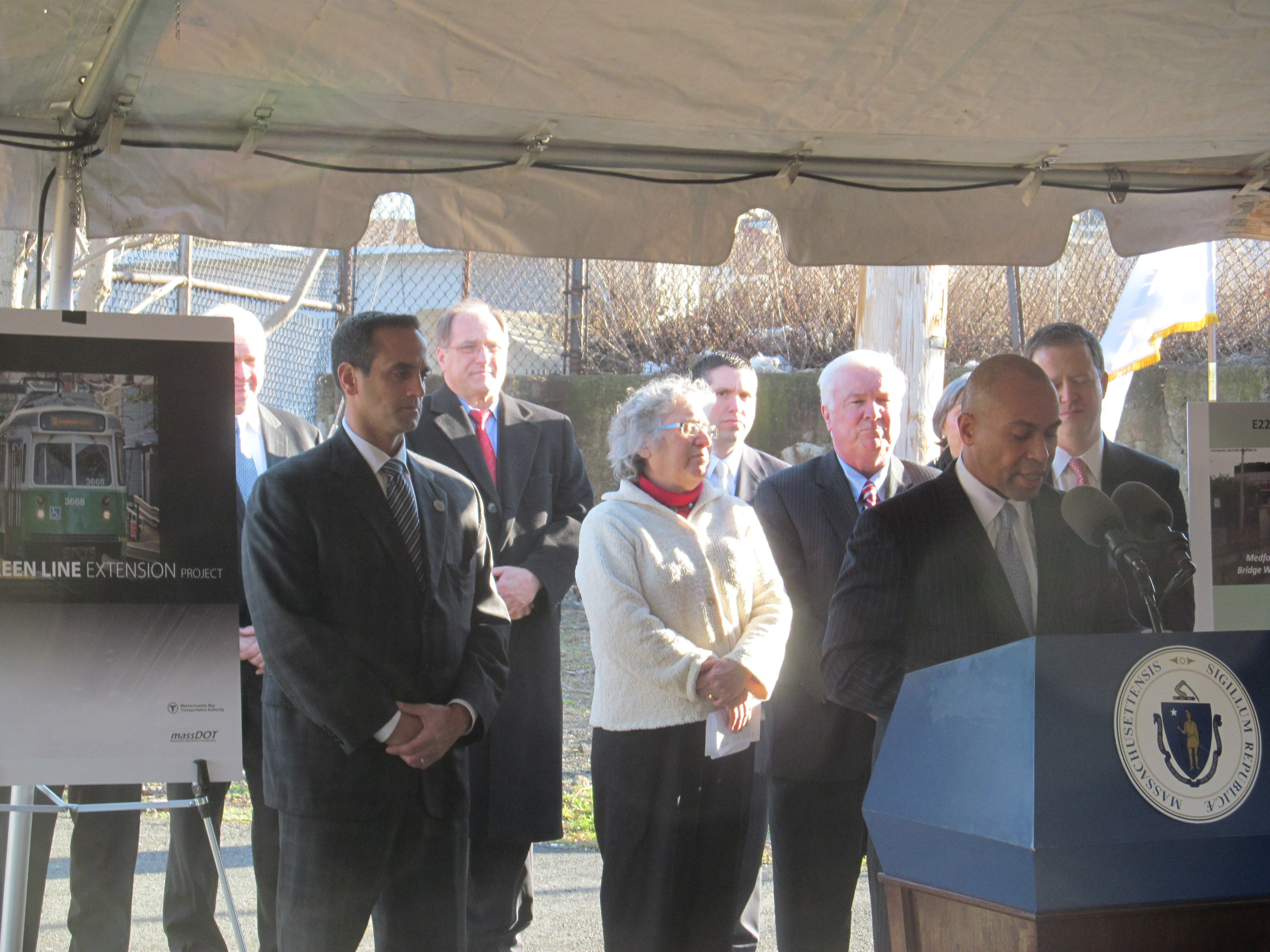
Massachusetts governor Deval Patrick speaks at the Green Line Extension groundbreaking on December 11, 2012. Davis is in the center.

Henrietta Davis is an American politician who served as the mayor of Cambridge, Massachusetts in 2012 and 2013. She was a member of the Cambridge City Council from 1996 to 2013, and a member of the Cambridge School Committee from 1988 to 1995.

Davis has focused on energy and the environment, non-auto transportation, neighborhood preservation, bridging the digital divide, children's health and quality living for seniors. She has attended the United Nations Climate Change Conference. She has received significant news coverage for proposing a limit on the size of soda and other sugar-sweetened beverages served at Cambridge restaurants, similar to the New York City soft drink size limit.

Before entering politics, Davis worked as a preschool administrator and as a journalist for Time, Life, Money and NPR. She has master's degrees in social work and public administration.
