= Richard M. Russell =

American lawyer and politician (1891–1977)

Member of the U.S. House of Representatives from Massachusetts's 9th district
- In office January 3, 1935 – January 3, 1937
- Preceded by: Robert Luce
- Succeeded by: Robert Luce

Mayor of Cambridge, Massachusetts
- In office January 1930 – January 1936
- Preceded by: Edward W. Quinn
- Succeeded by: John D. Lynch

Personal details
- Born: March 3, 1891 Cambridge, Massachusetts
- Died: February 27, 1977 (aged 85) Essex, Massachusetts
- Resting place: Pine Hill Cemetery, Tewksbury, Massachusetts
- Party: Democratic
- Education: Middlesex School; Harvard College, 1914; Harvard Law School, 1917.

Military service
- Allegiance: United States
- Branch/service: U.S. Army
- Rank: Second Lieutenant; First Lieutenant
- Unit: Three Hundred and Third Field Artillery; One Hundred and Fifty-first Field Artillery Brigade
- Battles/wars: World War I

Richard Manning Russell (March 3, 1891 – February 27, 1977) was a United States representative from Massachusetts. He was born in Cambridge on March 3, 1891, to Governor William Russell and Margaret Manning Swan. Russell attended Middlesex School in Concord. He graduated from Harvard University in 1914 and from Harvard Law School in 1917.

During World War I, he served as a second lieutenant in the Three Hundred and Third Field Artillery, and as a first lieutenant and communications officer of the One Hundred and Fifty-first Field Artillery Brigade. He was admitted to the bar and commenced practice in Boston. He was a member of the Cambridge City Council and served as Mayor of Cambridge.

He was elected as a Democrat to the Seventy-fourth Congress (January 3, 1935 – January 3, 1937). He was an unsuccessful candidate for reelection in 1936 to the Seventy-fifth Congress, for election in 1950 to fill a vacancy in the Eighty-first Congress, and for election in 1950 to the Eighty-second Congress. He resumed the practice of law in Boston and resided in Essex, where he died February 27, 1977. His interment was in Pine Hill Cemetery in Tewksbury.

Political offices
Preceded by Edward W. Quinn	Mayor of Cambridge, Massachusetts; January 1930-January 1936	Succeeded by John D. Lynch
U.S. House of Representatives
Preceded by Robert Luce	Member of the U.S. House of Representatives from Massachusetts's 9th congressional district January 3, 1935 – January 3, 1937	Succeeded by Robert Luce
