= Marc C. McGovern =

American politician

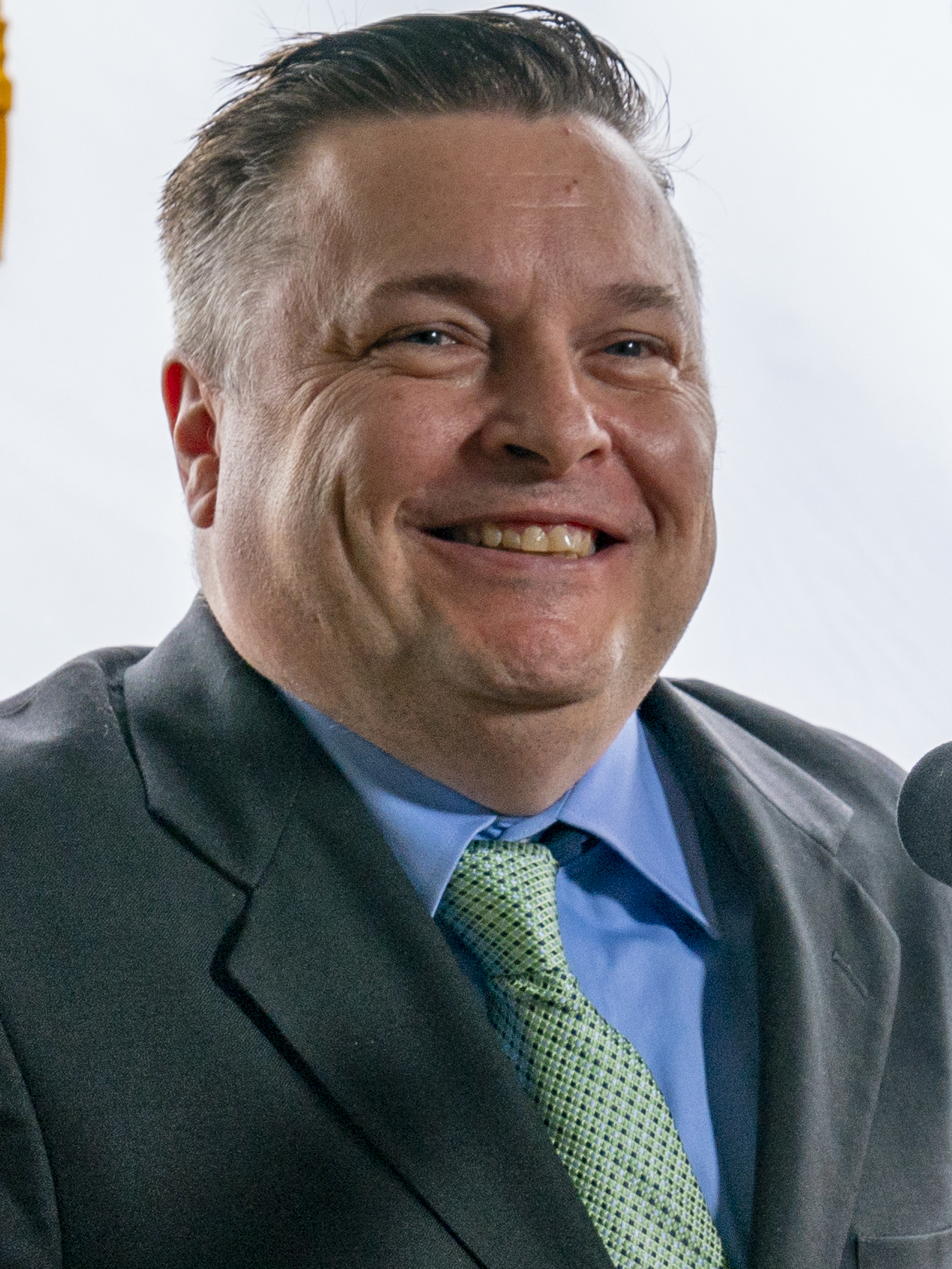
- McGovern in 2018

Mayor of Cambridge, Massachusetts
- In office January 2018 – January 2020
- Preceded by: E. Denise Simmons
- Succeeded by: Sumbul Siddiqui

Member of the Cambridge City Council
- Incumbent
- Assumed office January 2014

Marc C. McGovern is a Cambridge (Massachusetts) City Council member and was the 78th mayor from 2018 until 2020.

== Biography ==
McGovern grew up in Central Square, Cambridge and graduated from Cambridge Rindge and Latin School. He earned a BA from UMass Boston and a LCSW degree from the Simmons Graduate School of Social Work. Before his life in politics, He was a full-time social worker, and he continues to work part-time as a counselor at Farr Academy.

== Political career ==
In 2003, he began his political career on the Cambridge School Committee. After serving four terms on the Committee, he was elected to the Cambridge City Council in 2013. He was named mayor by the Cambridge City Council and sworn in on January 1, 2018, succeeding E. Denise Simmons. In January 2020, he announced that he would not seek re-election as mayor and endorsed fellow councilmember Sumbul Siddiqui as his successor. Siddiqui was sworn in as mayor on January 6, 2020. In 2024, McGovern was selected as vice mayor, under mayor E. Denise Simmons.
