= Frank Augustus Allen =

American politician

Mayor of Cambridge, Massachusetts
- In office January 1877 – January 1878
- Preceded by: Isaac Bradford
- Succeeded by: Samuel L. Montague

President of the Common Council of Cambridge, Massachusetts
- In office December 1876 – January 1877
- Preceded by: George F. Piper
- Succeeded by: Perez G. Porter

Member of the Common Council of Cambridge, Massachusetts
- In office 1875 – January 1877

Personal details
- Born: January 29, 1835; Sanford, Maine
- Died: May 22, 1916; Cambridge, Massachusetts
- Spouse: Elizabeth M. Scribner

Frank Augustus Allen (January 29, 1835 – May 22, 1916) was a Massachusetts politician who served as the Mayor of Cambridge, Massachusetts.

== Personal life ==
Frank was born in Sanford, Maine. His father died when he was two years old. He worked in various businesses, but retired after fourteen years. In 1867, he and others formed the Oriental Tea Company in Boston. He and his family moved to Cambridge in 1870, where he was elected Mayor in December of 1876. He died in Cambridge in 1916.

== Notes ==
Political offices
Preceded by Isaac Bradford	Mayor of Cambridge, Massachusetts; January 1877 – January 1878	Succeeded by Samuel L. Montague
Preceded by George F. Piper	President of the Common Council of Cambridge, Massachusetts; January 1876 – January 1877	Succeeded by Perez G. Porter
