= John Sargent (American politician) =

American politician

Member of the Massachusetts State Senate Middlesex County
- In office 1876–1876

Mayor of Cambridge, Massachusetts
- In office January 1855 – January 1860
- Preceded by: Zebina L. Raymond
- Succeeded by: James D. Green

Member of the Massachusetts State Senate Middlesex County
- In office 1849–1849

Member of the Massachusetts House of Representatives
- In office 1844–1848

Personal details
- Born: June 21, 1799 Hillsborough, New Hampshire, US
- Died: December 5, 1880 (aged 81) Cambridge, Massachusetts, US
- Party: Whig, Free Soil, Republican

John Sargent (June 21, 1799 – December 5, 1880) was a Massachusetts politician who served in both branches of the Massachusetts legislature, as a member and President of the Cambridge Common Council, and as the Mayor of Cambridge, Massachusetts.

== Personal life ==
John Sargent was born in Hillsborough, New Hampshire on June 21, 1799. He married Lucetta Tuttle, and they remained married until her death in 1855. John himself died on December 5, 1880, in Cambridge, Massachusetts.

== See also ==
- 1876 Massachusetts legislature

== Notes ==
Political offices
Preceded by Zebina L. Raymond	Mayor of Cambridge, Massachusetts; January 1863 - January 1864	Succeeded by James D. Green
