= North Pembroke, Massachusetts =

- Census-designated place
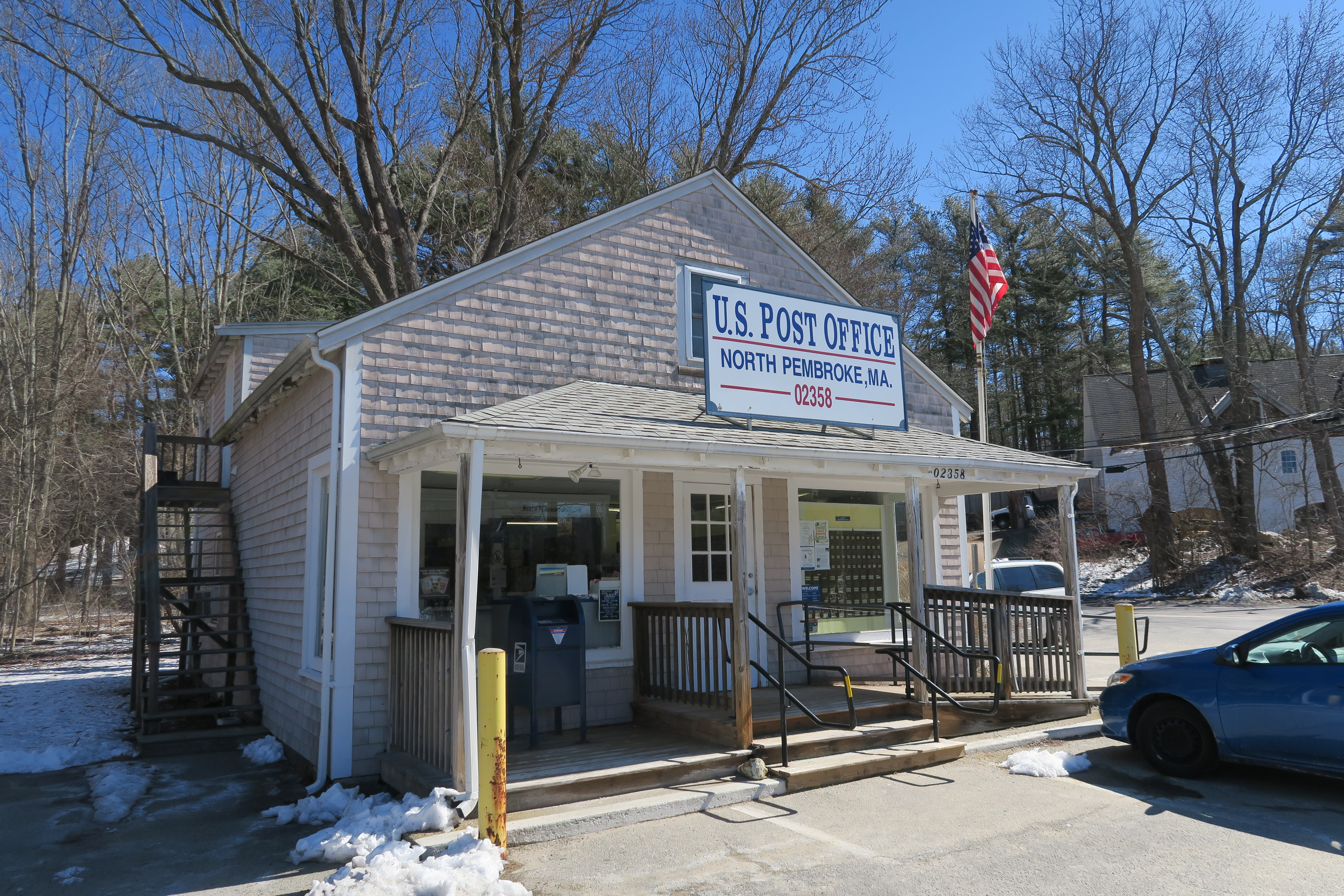
- Post Office

- Location in Plymouth County in Massachusetts
- Coordinates: 42°5′44″N 70°46′41″W
- Country: United States
- State: Massachusetts
- County: Plymouth

Area
  - Total: 4.47 sq mi (11.59 km^{2})
  - Land: 4.47 sq mi (11.59 km^{2})
  - Water: 0 sq mi (0.00 km^{2})
- Elevation: 46 ft (14 m)

Population (2020)
  - Total: 3,490
  - Density: 779.9/sq mi (301.12/km^{2})
- Time zone: UTC−5 (Eastern (EST))
  - Summer (DST): UTC−4 (EDT)
- ZIP Code: 02358
- Area code: 781
- FIPS code: 25-48710
- GNIS feature ID: 0613973

North Pembroke is a census-designated place (CDP) in the town of Pembroke in Plymouth County, Massachusetts, United States. As of the 2020 census, North Pembroke had a population of 3,490.

== Geography ==
North Pembroke is located at 42°5′44″N 70°46′41″W (42.095518, -70.777921).

According to the United States Census Bureau, the CDP has a total area of 11.4 km^{2} (4.4 mi^{2}), all land.

== Demographics ==
Historical population
Census	Pop.	Note	%±
2020	3,490		—
U.S. Decennial Census

=== 2020 census ===
As of the 2020 census, North Pembroke had a population of 3,490. The median age was 45.0 years. 20.8% of residents were under the age of 18 and 17.1% of residents were 65 years of age or older. For every 100 females there were 103.1 males, and for every 100 females age 18 and over there were 99.9 males age 18 and over.

100.0% of residents lived in urban areas, while 0.0% lived in rural areas.

There were 1,334 households in North Pembroke, of which 29.5% had children under the age of 18 living in them. Of all households, 49.3% were married-couple households, 16.4% were households with a male householder and no spouse or partner present, and 27.7% were households with a female householder and no spouse or partner present. About 28.4% of all households were made up of individuals and 13.9% had someone living alone who was 65 years of age or older.

There were 1,452 housing units, of which 8.1% were vacant. The homeowner vacancy rate was 2.0% and the rental vacancy rate was 12.7%.

Racial composition as of the 2020 census
Race	Number	Percent
White	3,169	90.8%
Black or African American	50	1.4%
American Indian and Alaska Native	11	0.3%
Asian	48	1.4%
Native Hawaiian and Other Pacific Islander	1	0.0%
Some other race	41	1.2%
Two or more races	170	4.9%
Hispanic or Latino (of any race)	104	3.0%

=== 2000 census ===
At the 2000 census there were 2,913 people in 1,000 households, including 761 families, in the CDP. The population density was 255.6/km^{2} (661.8/mi^{2}). There were 1,013 housing units at an average density of 88.9/km^{2} (230.1/mi^{2}). The racial makeup of the CDP was 97.12% White, 0.45% African American, 1.00% Asian, 0.41% from other races, and 1.03% from two or more races. Hispanic or Latino of any race were 0.72%.

Of the 1,000 households 40.2% had children under the age of 18 living with them, 64.6% were married couples living together, 7.4% had a female householder with no husband present, and 23.8% were non-families. 19.2% of households were one person and 6.2% were one person aged 65 or older. The average household size was 2.85 and the average family size was 3.32.

The age distribution was 29.4% under the age of 18, 6.0% from 18 to 24, 32.0% from 25 to 44, 23.9% from 45 to 64, and 8.7% 65 or older. The median age was 35 years. For every 100 females, there were 102.3 males. For every 100 females age 18 and over, there were 96.7 males.

The median household income was $73,542 and the median family income was $78,635. Males had a median income of $55,938 versus $38,190 for females. The per capita income for the CDP was $33,093. About 4.9% of families and 5.7% of the population were below the poverty line, including 6.5% of those under age 18 and 12.7% of those age 65 or over.
