= Ezra Parmenter =

American politician

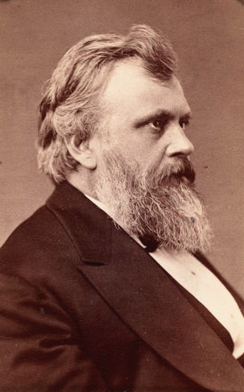
- Parmenter, c. 1874

13th Mayor of Cambridge, Massachusetts
- In office January 1867 – January 1868
- Preceded by: J. Warren Merrill
- Succeeded by: Charles H. Saunders

Member of the Massachusetts State Senate 3rd Middlesex District

Member of the Massachusetts House of Representatives

Personal details
- Born: March 20, 1823
- Died: January 31, 1883 (aged 59)
- Occupation: Physician, politician

Ezra Parmenter (March 20, 1823 – January 31, 1883) was a Massachusetts politician who served in both branches of the Massachusetts legislature, as an overseer of the poor, bridge commissioner, a city councilor and as the thirteenth Mayor of Cambridge, Massachusetts.

Parmenter was born to William Parmenter and Mary (Parker) Parmenter on March 20, 1823.

== See also ==
- 1872 Massachusetts legislature
- 1874 Massachusetts legislature
- 1875 Massachusetts legislature

== Notes ==
Political offices
| Preceded by J. Warren Merrill | 13th Mayor of Cambridge, Massachusetts; January 1867 – January 1868 | Succeeded by Charles H. Saunders |
