= Abraham Edwards (Massachusetts politician) =

American politician

Fifth Mayor of Cambridge, Massachusetts
- In office April 1854 – January 1855
- Preceded by: James D. Green
- Succeeded by: Zebina L. Raymond

Personal details
- Born: September 7, 1796 Boston, Massachusetts
- Died: February 5, 1870 Cambridge, Massachusetts
- Spouse: Anne Moore
- Education: Harvard
- Occupation: Attorney

Abraham Edwards (September 7, 1796 – February 5, 1870) was a Massachusetts politician who served as the fifth Mayor of Cambridge, Massachusetts.

== Early life ==
Edwards was born in Boston, Massachusetts to Abraham and Martha Edwards on September 7, 1796.

== Family life ==
Edwards married Anne Moore.

== Education ==
Edwards prepared for college under the tutorship of Charles Folsom. After studying under Folsom, Edwards entered Harvard. Edwards graduated from Harvard in 1819. After his graduation from Harvard, Edwards went on to study law with Judge Fay.

== Professional career ==
Edwards was admitted to the Massachusetts Bar in Middlesex County, in September 1822. Edwards began his practice of law in Brighton, Massachusetts, which was in Middlesex County at the time.

In 1832 Edwards moved to Cambridge.

== Political career ==
Edwards was elected the fifth Mayor of Cambridge, Massachusetts, serving from April 1854 to January 1855.

== Death ==
Edwards died in Cambridge on February 5, 1870.

== Notes ==
Political offices
Preceded by James D. Green	Mayor of Cambridge, Massachusetts; April 1854 - January 1855	Succeeded by Zebina L. Raymond
