= David P. Maher =

American CEO and politician

David P. Maher is the CEO and President of the Chamber of Commerce in Cambridge, Massachusetts (as of December 5, 2016) and a former politician. He was twice Mayor and a member of both the School Committee (from 1991 to 1999) and City Council (first elected in 1999).,

Maher graduated from Suffolk University and for more than twenty years, was director of development and public relations for Cambridge Family & Children's Service.

He is the third consecutive Cambridge mayor, behind Kenneth Reeves and E. Denise Simmons, to come out as gay.
