= Wendell D. Rockwood =

American politician

Wendell David Rockwood was a member of the Citizen's Municipal Party and was mayor of Cambridge, Massachusetts, United States, from 1916 to 1918. He is also a direct descendant of the Puritans of New England.

== Life and career ==
Wendell was born on April 21, 1863, in Belgrade, Maine, to Albion and Sara Jane (Ricker) Rockwood. He had at least one child, Agnes Rockwood Griffiths.

Rockwood was elected mayor of Cambridge, Massachusetts, on December 21, 1915, beating Timothy W. Good by 283 votes.
