= Edgar R. Champlin =

American politician (1858–1932)

Edgar Robert Champlin
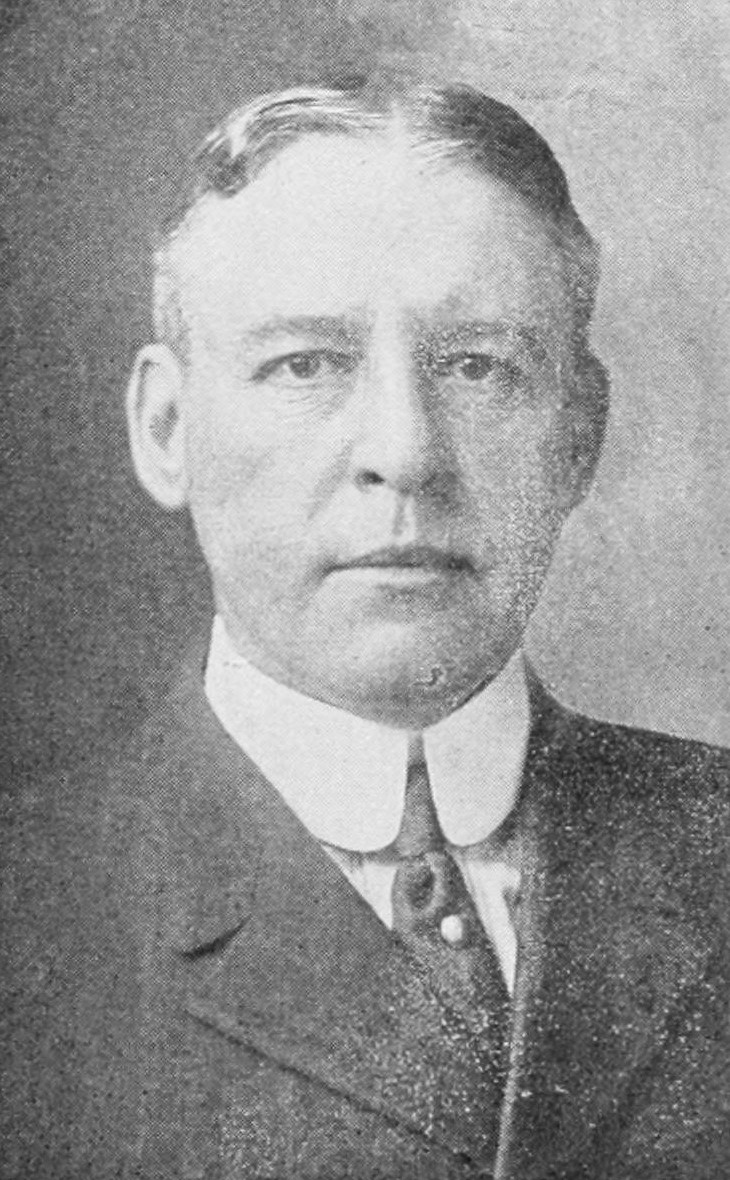

27th Mayor of Cambridge, Massachusetts
- In office January 1899 – January 1901
- Preceded by: Alvin F. Sortwell
- Succeeded by: David T. Dickinson

Member of the Board of Aldermen of Cambridge, Massachusetts
- In office 1893–1893

Member of the Common Council of Cambridge, Massachusetts
- In office 1885–1887

Personal details
- Born: November 9, 1858
- Died: November 8, 1932 Boston, Massachusetts, U.S.
- Party: Republican
- Spouse(s): Katherine E. Paine, m. December 12, 1883
- Education: Harvard Law School, class of 1880

Edgar Robert Champlin (November 9, 1858 – November 8, 1932) was a Massachusetts lawyer, banker, and politician who served as the twenty-seventh Mayor of Cambridge, Massachusetts.

== Legal career ==
Champlin attended Harvard Law School, graduating in June 1880. Champlin also read for the law in the law offices of Richard Henry Dana Jr. and Lewis S. Dabney.

Even before he graduated from Harvard Law School, Champlin was admitted to the bar, in April 1880.

== Family life ==
Champlin married Katherine E. Paine of Cambridge on December 12, 1883.

== Notes ==
Political offices
Preceded by Alvin F. Sortwell	27th Mayor of Cambridge, Massachusetts; January 1899 – January 1901	Succeeded by David T. Dickinson
