= Walter C. Wardwell =

American politician

Mayor of Cambridge, Massachusetts
- In office January 1907 – April 1909
- Preceded by: Charles H. Thurston
- Succeeded by: William F. Brooks

President of the Cambridge, Massachusetts Board of Aldermen

Member of the Cambridge, Massachusetts Board of Aldermen

Member of the Cambridge, Massachusetts Common Council
- In office 1894–1895

Personal details
- Born: January 27, 1859 Richmond, Virginia
- Died: September 29, 1940 (aged 81) Cambridge, Massachusetts, U.S.

Walter Chalk Wardwell (January 27, 1859 – September 29, 1940) was a Massachusetts politician who served as the Mayor of Cambridge, Massachusetts. Before becoming mayor, he was appointed as Deputy Sheriff of Cambridge in 1893.

== Career ==
After becoming mayor in January 1907, Wardwell advocated for at least 5 intermediate stations in Cambridge on the Cambridge subway, while suburbanites interested in faster through travel argued for only a single intermediate station at Central Square. The two groups finally compromised on two intermediate stations, at Central Square and Kendall Square, allowing construction to start in 1909.

== Personal life ==
Wardwell was born on January 27, 1859, in Richmond, Virginia to Burnham Wardwell and Sarah J. Goodale. On January 12, 1888, Wardwell married Grace Gardner Jones in Cambridge, Massachusetts. He died on September 29, 1940, in Cambridge, Massachusetts.

== Notes ==
Political offices
Preceded by Charles H. Thurston	Mayor of Cambridge, Massachusetts; January 1907 – April 1909	Succeeded by William F. Brooks
