= Augustine J. Daly =

American politician

Augustine John Daly

Mayor of Cambridge, Massachusetts
- In office January 1904 – January 1906
- Preceded by: John H. H. McNamee
- Succeeded by: Charles H. Thurston

Personal details
- Died: December 1938; Cambridge, Massachusetts
- Spouse: Mary Margaret McCarthy

Augustine John Daly was a Massachusetts politician who served as the Mayor of Cambridge, Massachusetts.

In 1903, Daly ran as a non-partisan candidate for mayor. In the December 1903 election Daly defeated Democratic party incumbent mayor John H. H. McNamee by 70 votes.

== Personal life ==
Augustine married Mary Margaret McCarthy.

== Notes ==
Political offices
Preceded by John H. H. McNamee	Mayor of Cambridge, Massachusetts; January 1904 – January 1906	Succeeded by Charles H. Thurston
