= John W. Lyons =

American politician

John W. Lyons was mayor of Cambridge, Massachusetts, from January 1938 to July 22, 1941. He was arrested in office under 66 charges for bribery and conspiracy with contractor Paul Mannos. Both were sentenced on March 21, 1941, to three to four years each in State prison, as well as two years in the House of Correction after.

This happened while Lyons and Mannos were working together on the City of Cambridge's $2,000,000 municipal building program. Lyons named Mannos a former political associate while he ran for mayor in 1938.
