= 2008 Massachusetts House of Representatives election =

- November 4, 2008

All 160 seats in the Massachusetts House of Representatives 81 seats needed for a majority
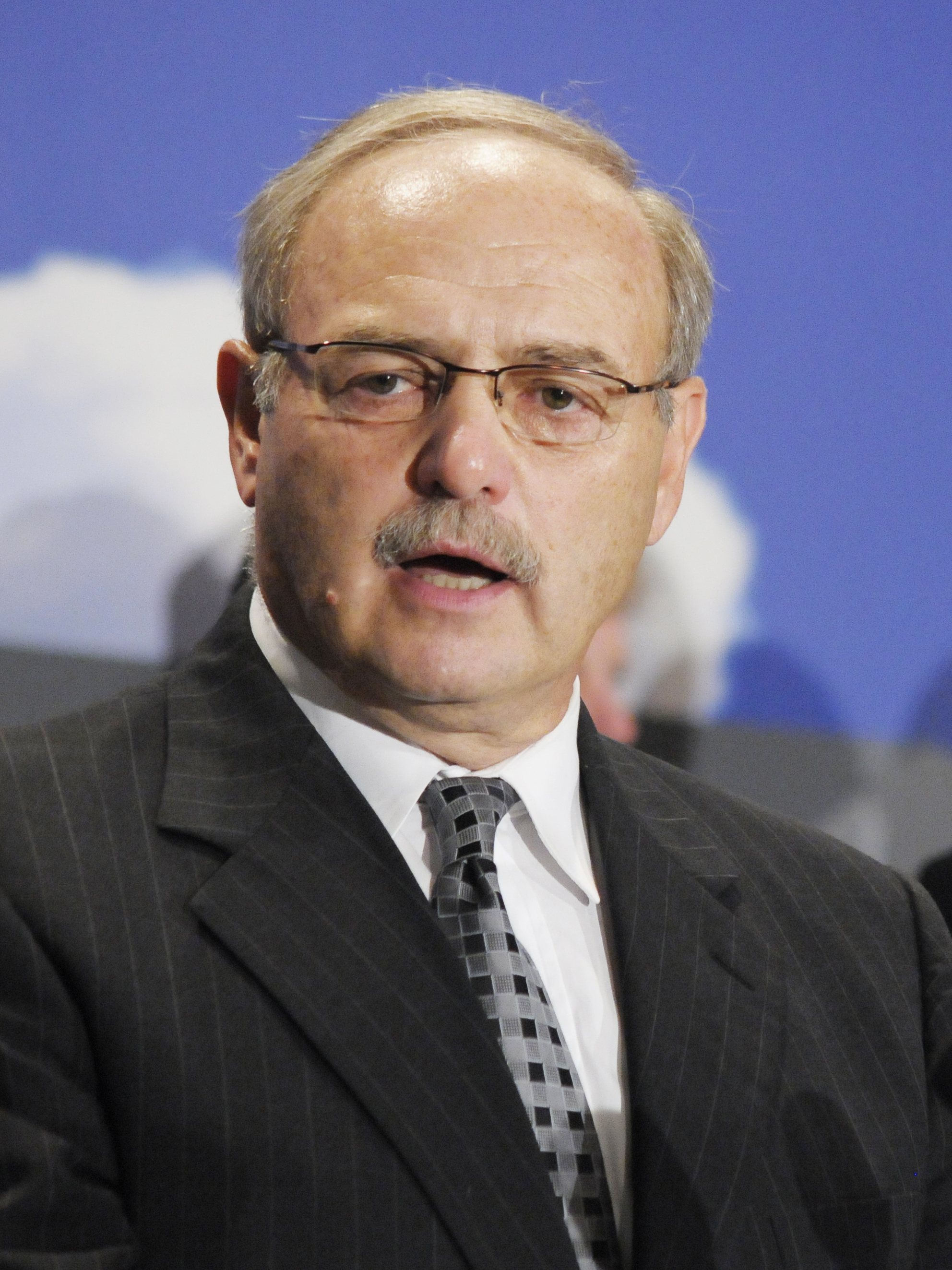

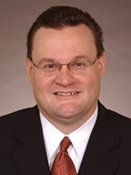
	Majority party	Minority party
Leader	Salvatore DiMasi	Bradley Jones Jr.
Party	Democratic	Republican
Leader since	September 28, 2004	November 21, 2002
Leader's seat	3rd Suffolk	20th Middlesex
Last election	141 seats	19 seats
Seats won	144 (Note: Includes Timothy Madden, who was elected as an independent.)	16
Seat change	▲3	▼3
- Results: Democratic hold Democratic gain Republican hold Independent gain
Speaker before election
Salvatore DiMasi
Democratic
Elected Speaker
Salvatore DiMasi
Democratic

The 2008 Massachusetts House of Representatives elections were held on November 4, 2008, the same date as the 2008 Massachusetts Senate election as well as Federal and Congressional elections. The term for elected representatives is two years, January 2009 until January 2011.

== Predictions ==
Source	Ranking	As of
Stateline	Safe D	October 15, 2008

== Results ==
District	Incumbent	Competing candidates	Result
2nd Barnstable	Demetrius Atsalis (Dem)	Demetrius Atsalis (Dem); Carl Yingling (Ind)	12,345 (68%); 5,901 (32%)
3rd Barnstable	Matthew Patrick (Dem)	Matthew Patrick (Dem); Carey Murphy (Ind)	12,863 (60%); 8,735 (40%)
4th Barnstable	Sarah Peake (Dem)	Sarah Peake (Dem); Donald Howell (Rep)	17,788 (68%); 8,419 (32%)
5th Barnstable	Jeffrey Perry (Rep)	Jeffrey Perry (Rep); Glenn Pare (Dem)	14,759 (69%); 6,776 (31%)
Barnstable, Dukes & Nantucket	Eric Turkington (Dem)	Timothy Madden (Ind); Daniel Larkosh (Dem); Melissa Freitag (Unr); Jacob Ferreira (Ind)	9,530 (41%); 7,507 (32%); 3,398 (14%); 3,008 (13%)
1st Bristol	Jay Barrows (Rep)	Jay Barrows (Rep); Devin Romanul (Dem)	11,316 (61%); 7,162 (39%)
2nd Bristol	John Lepper (Rep)	Bill Bowles (Dem); George T. Ross (Rep)	8,728 (54%); 7,439 (46%)
7th Bristol	Kevin Aguiar (Dem)	Kevin Aguiar (Dem); CJ Ferry (Rep)	9,148 (81%); 2,189 (19%)
4th Essex	Bradford Hill (Rep)	Bradford Hill (Rep); Donald Bumiller (Dem)	15,752 (71%); 6,365 (29%)
8th Essex	Lori Ehrlich (Dem)	Lori Ehrlich (Dem); John Blaisdell (Rep)	14,049 (68%); 6,706 (32%)
15th Essex	Linda Dean Campbell (Dem)	Linda Dean Campbell (Dem); Joseph Leone (Ind)	11,812 (70%); 5,016 (30%)
18th Essex	Barbara L'Italien (Dem)	Barbara L'Italien (Dem); Lawrence Brennan	11,952 (59%); 8,261 (41%)
2nd Franklin	Christopher Donelan (Dem)	Christopher Donelan (Dem); Robert Parks	13,914 (79%); 3,682 (21%)
2nd Hampden	Mary S. Rogeness (Rep)	Brian Ashe (Dem); William Scibelli (Rep)	12,069 (54%); 10,104 (46%)
3rd Hampden	Rosemary Sandlin (Dem)	Rosemary Sandlin (Dem); Nicholas Boldyga (Ind)	10,243 (52%); 9,457 (48%)
4th Hampden	Donald Humason (Rep)	Donald Humason (Rep); Brian Hoose (Dem)	11,482 (69%); 5,071 (31%)
10th Hampden	Cheryl Coakley-Rivera (Dem)	Cheryl Coakley-Rivera (Dem); George Vazquez (Rep)	6,733 (85%); 1,165 (15%)
1st Middlesex	Robert Hargraves (Rep)	Robert Hargraves (Rep); Virginia Wood (Dem); Zachary Saboliauskas (Ind)	11,462 (53%); 8,797 (41%); 1,224 (6%)
2nd Middlesex	Geoffrey D. Hall (Dem)	James Arciero (Dem); Paul Avella (Rep)	12,072 (53%); 10,639 (47%)
3rd Middlesex	Patricia Walrath (Dem)	Kate Hogan (Dem); Sonny Parente (Rep); David Goulding (Ind)	10,156 (48%); 9,281 (44%); 1,896 (9%)
4th Middlesex	Stephen LeDuc (Dem)	Danielle Gregoire (Dem); Arthur Vigeant (Rep); Joseph Valianti (Ind)	9,031 (48%); 8,286 (44%); 1,480 (8%)
8th Middlesex	Paul Loscocco (Rep)	Carolyn Dykema (Dem); Dan Haley (Rep)	11,647 (52%); 10,756 (48%)
13th Middlesex	Thomas Conroy (Dem)	Thomas Conroy (Dem); Susan W. Pope (Rep)	12,126 (59%); 8,485 (41%)
14th Middlesex	Cory Atkins (Dem)	Cory Atkins (Dem); Richard McClure (Ind)	13,793 (65%); 7,285 (35%)
18th Middlesex	Kevin Murphy (Dem)	Kevin Murphy (Dem); Kenneth Patrician (Unr)	6,590 (84%); 1,288 (16%)
20th Middlesex	Bradley Jones, Jr. (Rep)	Bradley Jones, Jr. (Rep); Claire Paradiso (Dem)	16,388 (71%); 6,595 (29%)
22nd Middlesex	William Greene, Jr. (Dem)	William Greene, Jr. (Dem); Anthony Lucacio (Rep)	11,821 (65%); 6,491 (35%)
31st Middlesex	Paul C. Casey (Dem)	Jason Lewis (Dem); Brian O'Connor (Rep); Chad Riley (Ind)	10,825 (52%); 5,131 (24%); 5,048 (24%)
37th Middlesex	James B. Eldridge (Dem)	Jennifer Benson (Dem); Kurt Hayes (Rep)	11,681 (56%); 9,257 (44%)
4th Norfolk	James Murphy (Dem)	James Murphy (Dem); Robert Thomas (GOP)	13,356 (75%); 4,556 (25%)
5th Norfolk	Joseph R. Driscoll (Dem)	Joseph R. Driscoll (Dem); Richard Moran (Unr)	15,271 (79%); 3,944 (21%)
9th Norfolk	Richard Ross (Rep)	Richard Ross (Rep); Thomas Roache (Ind)	12,681 (61%); 7,969 (39%)
11th Norfolk	Paul McMurtry (Dem)	Paul McMurtry; Unopposed	12,766 (98.6%); 186 (1.4%)
1st Plymouth	Vinny deMacedo (Rep)	Vinny deMacedo (Rep); Jay Ferguson (Dem)	14,757 (68%); 7,101 (32%)
4th Plymouth	Frank M. Hynes (Dem)	James Cantwell (Dem); John Valianti (Ind)	13,951 (62%); 8,651 (38%)
9th Plymouth	Thomas P. Kennedy (Dem)	Michael Brady (Dem); Lawrence Novak (Rep)	10,794 (84%); 2,097 (16%)
2nd Worcester	Robert Rice (Dem)	Robert Rice (Dem); Carolyn Kamuda (Unr)	9,665 (56%)
4th Worcester	Jennifer Flanagan (Dem)	Dennis Rosa (Dem); Claire Freda (Unr)	9,665 (56%); 7,465 (44%)
5th Worcester	Anne Gobi (Dem)	Anne Gobi (Dem); Stephen Comtois (Rep)	13,639 (71%); 5,672 (29%)
6th Worcester	Geraldo Alicea (Dem)	Geraldo Alicea (Dem); Ronald Chernisky (Rep)	11,040 (60%); 7,216 (40%)
7th Worcester	Paul Frost (Rep)	Paul Frost (Rep); Daniel Carpenter (Dem)	12,608 (65%); 6,671 (35%)
8th Worcester	Paul Kujawski (Dem)	Paul Kujawski (Dem); Kevin Kuros (Rep)	9,806 (53%); 8,576 (47%)
16th Worcester	John Fresolo (Dem)	John Fresolo (Dem); Mathew Taylor (Ind)	7,347 (69%); 3,307 (31%)

== See also ==
- List of Massachusetts General Courts
