= Alice Wolf =

American politician (1933–2023)

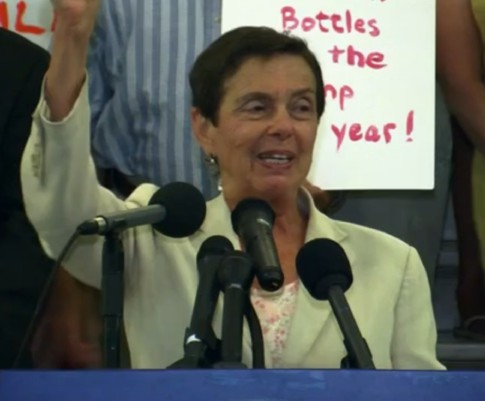
- Wolf in July 2012

Member of the Massachusetts House of Representatives from the 25th Middlesex district
- In office 1996–2013
- Preceded by: Charles Flaherty
- Succeeded by: Marjorie Decker

Personal details
- Born: Alice Koerner; December 24, 1933 Vienna, Austria
- Died: January 26, 2023 (aged 89) Cambridge, Massachusetts, U.S.
- Party: Democratic
- Spouse: Robert (Bob) Wolf (m. 1955)
- Children: 2
- Education: Simmons College
- Occupation: Politician

Alice K. Wolf (née Koerner; December 24, 1933 – January 26, 2023) was an Austrian-born American politician who served as a member of the Massachusetts House of Representatives from 1996 to 2013, representing the 25th Middlesex District.

On March 22, 2012, Wolf announced that she would not seek re-election. Her term ended in January 2013.

She previously served on the Cambridge, Massachusetts School Committee and Cambridge City Council, and as Mayor of Cambridge for one year, from 1990 to 1991.

== Early life and education ==
Wolf was born to a Jewish family in 1933 in Vienna, Austria. Her parents, Frederick (Fritz) and Renee Koerner, fled Nazi persecution in 1938, bringing the family to Brighton, Massachusetts.

Wolf attended the Baldwin Early Learning Center in Brighton, Massachusetts and high school at Boston Girls Latin School, which is now Boston Latin Academy in Boston.

She graduated from Simmons College in Boston, where she graduated in 1955 with a degree in Experimental Psychology. The same year, she and her husband, Robert Wolf were married. The Wolfs settled in Cambridge, Massachusetts, where they raised their two children.

She later earned a master's degree in public administration at Harvard Kennedy School at Harvard University.

== Career ==
Wolf’s career started at the Lincoln Laboratory at the Massachusetts Institute of Technology, where she conducted perceptual research by programming the Memory Test Computer to display dot patterns to human subjects. Later, she co-authored a paper "Baseball: An Automated Question Answerer" which described an early attempt at natural language database queries. The paper was translated into Chinese and Russian.

After Lincoln Laboratory, Wolf worked at Bolt Beranek and Newman as well as Computer Corporation of America, which was later acquired by Rocket Software.

Wolf’s path to civic engagement and elective office began with participation in the Parent-Teacher Association of the Peabody School in Cambridge, where her sons were students. Her involvement as a parent with school affairs led to her election in 1974 as a member of the Cambridge School Committee, where she served from January 1974 through January 1982.

On November 6, 1973, Wolf started her career in public service by winning an election to join the Cambridge School Committee, a position she held from January 1974 to January 1982. As a member of the School Committee, Wolf championed community involvement in decision-making, including the hiring of school principals, crafted the first plan for racial desegregation of the city's schools, and led the establishment of the city's high school, the Cambridge Rindge and Latin School.

In 1981, near the end of her fourth term on the School Committee, she felt that her efforts to bring about social equality would be better spent on the Cambridge City Council. She ran for the Council in 1981, but narrowly missed a win in a crowded field of 25 candidates.

In 1983, she again ran for election to the Cambridge City Council and was successful. She joined the Council in January 1984.

== Cambridge City Council ==
Wolf’s accomplishments on the Cambridge City Council included the establishment and passage of a number of key laws. In 1984, she sponsored the Cambridge Human Rights Ordinance, that protects Cambridge residents from discrimination on the basis of sexual orientation, as well as other protected classes. Wolf also led the city initiative to create a domestic partners ordinance, and establish the commission to enforce the ordinance.

In the 1980s, in conjunction with the Cambridge Peace Commission, she created a "peace curriculum," a program of peace education for the public schools, K-12, to assist teachers in assuring kids of all ages could develop a constructive approach to resolving differences and disputes. Wolf led marches and did research to support "economic conversion," trying to convince local companies to convert military-focused enterprises into peace-oriented activities. She developed Sister City relationships, a model for international cooperation at the grassroots level, with San José Las Flores, Chalatenango, El Salvador and Yerevan, Armenia. Wolf led the effort to make Cambridge a Sanctuary City, where persecuted people fleeing tyranny and death in their countries of origin could come when they were not given political asylum in the U.S. Wolf worked with the Cambridge Peace Commission and others to hold a yearly Cambridge Holocaust Commemoration, support Armenia (through the Cambridge-Yerevan sister city relationship) after the 1988 earthquake, continue nurturing the connection with the residents of San Jose Las Flores, El Salvador, and to bring together Cambridge people of diverse backgrounds to support our Muslim neighbors after 9/11.

Wolf led in the creation of the Cambridge Kids Council, which is dedicated to developing policy recommendations and programs aimed at improving the quality of life for children, youth and families in Cambridge.

The Cambridge City Council is elected by Proportional Representation using the Single Transferable Vote system. After inauguration, the Mayor is selected by the elected members of the city council.

=== Mayor ===
Wolf served as the mayor of Cambridge, Massachusetts from January 1990 to January 1992. She was elected five times to the Council, serving from 1984 through 1994.

Wolf was the sponsor of the first Mayor's Gay Pride Breakfast, which has become an annual Cambridge event. At a subsequent Gay Pride Breakfast, she was named an "honorary lesbian."

During the era of rent control in Massachusetts, Cambridge prohibited any apartment from being vacant for more than 120 days. Those who violated the law were subject to a $500 a day fine and jail time. Because of the low rents owner John McAdams was receiving, he was unable to repair several of his apartments on Broadway to make them legally habitable. When they sat vacant longer than 120 days, four families then moved into the apartments, without McAdams' knowledge or consent. Wolf said she recognized that squatting in the apartments was "an illegal action," but supported the squatters and visited them in the apartments.

=== Scheme Z ===
Wolf led Cambridge in its opposition to Scheme Z, the widely-criticized proposed interchange for the planned Big Dig highway project. Scheme Z would have added additional miles of loop ramps to the interchange. Wolf successfully worked to get Cambridge to file a lawsuit in order to stop this aspect of the plan from going forward.

== State representative ==
In the fall of 1996, Wolf successfully ran for a seat on the Massachusetts House of Representatives, defeating Anthony Galluccio in the Democratic Primary by 89 votes. She was reelected in subsequent terms and served in the Massachusetts legislature for 16 years.

Wolf served as the House Chair of the Committee on Elder Affairs and on the Women’s Legislative Caucus. She was recognized for her advocacy through numerous honors and awards including the Executive Office of Health and Human Services Department of Mental Health 2010 Certificate of Appreciation; the 2009 School-Based Health Center Legislative Champion Award; the 2007 NOW Legislator of the Year; the 2007 Byron Rushing Freedom of Religion Award from the Religious Coalition for the Freedom to Marry; the 2006 Massachusetts Family Planning Association Leadership Award; the 2005 Champions of Children Award from Massachusetts Advocates for Children; and the 2005 Early Education Leadership Award from the Massachusetts Association of Community Partnerships for Children.

Wolf worked on many progressive issues and on countless bills. During her tenure, she worked to promote gender equality, GLBT rights, marriage equality, minority and immigrant rights, environmental causes, education, health care, reproductive rights, affordable housing, education and senior issues. She served as the House Chair of the Committee on Elder Affairs and of the Women’s Legislative Caucus. Wolf’s perseverance and hard work on behalf of those she represented was widely recognized. When faced with barriers to progressive legislation, she identified allies, worked within coalitions, and created strategies to move forward.

Wolf worked closely with activists and other leaders in their efforts to ensure that the Supreme Judicial Court’s decision in Goodridge v. Department of Public Health, which legalized same-sex marriage in Massachusetts, were not the subject of a public referendum. As a House whip, she persuaded legislators to vote against bringing the matter before a legislative constitutional convention.

=== Bottle bill ===
Wolf’s legislative legacy includes her work to update the state’s bottle bill. The Bottle Bill Update passed the Senate in 2012, but was not passed by the House. Efforts to update the Massachusetts Bottle Bill through a statewide ballot initiative in 2014 were defeated, with more than 70 percent of the voters voting against it.

== Death ==
Wolf died after a short battle with leukemia at her home in Cambridge, Massachusetts, on January 26, 2023, at the age of 89.

== Education ==
- BS, Simmons College (Massachusetts), 1955
- MPA, Harvard Kennedy School, Harvard University, 1978
- Doctor of Education (Honorary), Wheelock College, 2001

== Elected office ==
- Representative, Massachusetts House of Representatives, 1996-2012
- Member, Massachusetts Democratic Party State Committeewoman, 1984–present
- Member, Democratic Ward and City Committee, 1972–present
- Member, Cambridge City Council, 1984-1994
- Mayor, Cambridge, Massachusetts, 1990-1992
- Member, Cambridge School Committee, 1974-1982
- Delegate to Democratic National Conventions in 1980, 1984, 1988, 1992, 2000, 2008, and 2016

== Other public office ==
- Massachusetts Municipal Association and Governor's Local Advisory Council, 1988-1993
- Chair/Vice-Chair/Board Representative, Cities and Education Task Force, 1989-1992
- Human Development Steering Committee, 1985-1989

Other professional careers

- Senior Advisor, Massachusetts Advocates for Children, 2015–present
- Consultant, Tufts University Center on Hunger, Poverty and Nutrition Policy, 1994-1996
- Lecturer, Harvard Medical School, 1994-1996
- Personnel Director, Computer Corporation of America, 1968-1976
- University of Massachusetts, Boston, Center for Women in Politics and Public Policy, Distinguished Public Service Fellow 2018-2020

== Memberships ==
- Member/Co-Chair, Family Center Committee, Cambridge Kid's Council, 1994-1996
- Member, Low Income Working Circle, 1994-1996
- Member, Radcliffe College Public Policy Institute, 1994-1996
- Member, Women's and Children's Health Clerkship, 1994-1996
- Fellow, Harvard University Institute of Politics, 1994
- Member, Women in Municipal Government, 1989-1994
- Member, Massachusetts Municipal Association, 1985-1994
- Board of Directors, National League of Cities, 1985-1994

Political offices
| Preceded by Alfred Vellucci | Mayor of Cambridge, Massachusetts; 1990–1991 | Succeeded by Kenneth Reeves |
Massachusetts House of Representatives
| Preceded by Charles Flaherty | Massachusetts State Representative for the 25th Middlesex District; 1996–2013 | Succeeded by Marjorie Decker |
