= Leonard J. Russell (politician) =

American politician

Leonard J. Russell (1932 – June 16, 1985) was a mayor (council chairman) of Cambridge, Massachusetts and husband of mayor Sheila Russell. Russell, a former waste disposal manager, represented the traditional conservative blue collar workforce of Cambridge at the time when traditional neighborhoods were giving up to pressure from expanding universities and high technology companies.

Russell joined Cambridge local politics during the 1967 municipal council election, losing then and in the next two elections. He finally won a council seat in 1973, and was re-elected in 1975, but lost again in 1977. He won re-election in 1979, and continued on the council until his death in 1985. Russell launched his career as an independent candidate on a platform for a professional city management, and joined the bi-partisan coalition that was established to elect Walter J. Sullivan as mayor. Russell remained in alliance with Sullivan and in opposition to the anti-patronage and academic-aligned Cambridge Civic Association for most of his tenure, although eventually Sullivan sided with the CCA.

Russell was elected mayor of Cambridge in January 1984; it was his fourth attempt for a mayor's seat. At first, the city council was split, with incumbent Alfred Vellucci and three other candidates, including Russell, competing for the job; media predicted a protracted campaign like that of 1948, when it took 43 weeks to elect a candidate. Russell, this time in alliance with liberal council members, nevertheless was elected after only four weeks of debate. He was immediately involved in clashes around the firing of long-term School Superintendent William Lannon, accused of political patronage but supported by the parents; the situation temporarily defused only in the end of October and was followed by a work-to-rule action by schoolteachers in November. He also had to moderate a local campaign against nerve gas testing at Arthur D. Little. In another controversial move, Russell spoke to "stop the expansion of MIT and Harvard into Cambridge's neighborhoods" and intervened against Harvard University plans, declaring his intention to take the property owned by Harvard on eminent domain terms and redevelop it into low-income public housing.

Russell himself, speaking on the first anniversary of his mayoral election, claimed local ordinances on human rights and on suppression of smokers to be his most important achievements of the year. The controversial smoking ordinance, enacted in July 1984, banned tobacco smoking in restaurants, except for specially designated smoking areas. Russell said, "I was in favor because people should be able to go out and enjoy a meal without being disturbed by others smoking". After his death, media disclosed that Russell was already fighting cancer when elected mayor.

Shortly after his death, the state of Massachusetts renamed Huron Avenue Bridge after Russell. Harvard University established six, now (2009) three Leonard Russell scholarships for local municipal employees.

Political offices
Preceded by Alfred Vellucci	Mayor of Cambridge, Massachusetts; 1984 - 1985	Succeeded by Francis Duehay
