= Marjorie Decker =

American politician

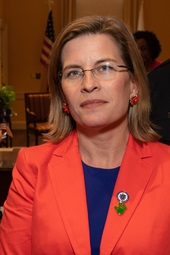

Member of the Massachusetts House of Representatives from the 25th Middlesex district
- Incumbent
- Assumed office January 7, 2013
- Preceded by: Alice Wolf

Personal details
- Party: Democratic
- Spouse: Bahij Bandar
- Children: 2
- Education: University of Massachusetts (B.A.); University of Massachusetts (M.P.A); Harvard University (M.A.)
- Occupation: Legislator

Marjorie C. Decker is an American politician who has served in the Massachusetts House of Representatives representing the 25th Middlesex district since 2013. A Democrat, Decker previously served on the Cambridge City Council from 1993 to 2013.

== Early life ==
Decker was born and raised in Cambridge, Massachusetts, to a father who was Vietnam war veteran and worked as a security guard while her mother was a nursing assistant. She grew up in public housing in Cambridgeport, and graduated from the Cambridge Rindge and Latin School.

Decker received her Bachelor of Arts in social thought and political economy from the University of Massachusetts, Amherst, an MPA from the University of Massachusetts Boston, and a Master of Science from the John F. Kennedy School of Government of Harvard University in 2007.

== Political career ==
Decker served seven terms on the Cambridge City Council in Cambridge, Massachusetts from 1999 to 2013 and at the time was the youngest woman ever to be elected to the Cambridge City Council, and served as Vice Mayor from 2004 to 2005, where she attracted publicity for her staunch opposition against the Iraq War. A Harvard Crimson profile noted her priorities were affordable housing and education.

As city councilor, Decker filed a policy order directing the city manager to investigate a trip by municipal law enforcement to Israel.

In 2012, she was elected as a state representative to the Massachusetts legislature, succeeding Alice Wolf. As a state representative, Decker has focused on public health, maternal health, environmental justice, workers rights, and criminal justice issues. She has served as co-chair of the Joint Committee on Public Health and helped develop maternal health legislation expanding access to midwifery, doula, and postpartum care services. The Boston Globe has described her as a champion in bills enshrining abortion rights.

She has also supported or written legislation related to environmental contaminants in consumer products and proposed clean energy transition policies, including a bill to transition Massachusetts to 100% renewal energy by 2035, and co-authored legislation to expand the Residential Assistance for Families in Transition program.

In 2015, Decker hosted a group of students, activists, and members of the Islamic community on "Muslim Day on the Hill" following vandalism at a Burlington mosque.

=== H. 4773 Maternal Health Bill ===
As lead House negotiator of the Maternal Health Bill, Decker developed legislation to create resources on maternal health, which was signed by the Governor in August 2024. The maternal health bill expands access to midwifery care and out-of-hospital births, and bill mandates insurance coverage for midwifery services while expanding MassHealth coverage to services for pregnancy and post-partum care including doula services. The bill also regulates freestanding birth centers, and mandates postpartum depression screenings and data collection on pregnancy loss.

=== Gun violence ===
Following a spate of mass shootings nationally, the state legislature passed extreme risk protection orders, also known as a red flag law, written by Decker in 2018. The measure allows family members and law enforcement to petition a court to temporarily restrict an individual's access to firearms if the court finds that person poses an imminent risk of causing bodily injury with firearms. Extreme risk protection orders may remain in effect for up to one year.

Decker began working on the legislation after a Harvard student approached her in 2016 with gun-safety proposals prompted by the suicide of a childhood friend. Decker's proposal had the support of the Massachusetts Chiefs of Police Association and Everytown for Gun Safety, which thanked Decker for her work.

=== Police Accountability Legislation ===
In 2018, Decker co-authored legislation aimed at closing a loophole in Massachusetts law to ensure that police officers cannot claim consensual sexual conduct with individuals in their custody. The proposal seeks to eliminate ambiguity regarding consent in such situations, which would align state law with zero-tolerance federal policies. This initiative followed high-profile cases where officers were accused of sexual misconduct.

=== Economic justice ===
Decker was the lead House sponsor of legislation repealing Massachusetts' "family cap," which denied additional Transitional Aid to Families with Dependent Children (TAFDC) benefits for children born while a family was already receiving assistance. The Legislature enacted the repeal in 2019 over Governor Charlie Baker's veto.

Decker later partnered with Senator Sal DiDomenico on legislation to increase Massachusetts' two principal cash assistance programs, Transitional Aid to Families with Dependent Children (TAFDC) and Emergency Aid to the Elderly, Disabled and Children (EAEDC), with the goal of raising benefits toward 50 percent of the federal poverty level.

The proposal followed a series of incremental benefit increases enacted through the state budget process beginning in 2021, including the first increase to TAFDC benefits since 2000 and the first increase to EAEDC benefits since 1988. An additional 10 percent increase to both programs took effect in April 2025.

In 2026, Decker and DiDomenico testified in support of the ASAP Act, an omnibus anti-poverty proposal that would expand cash assistance, strengthen worker protections, and establish additional wealth-building initiatives for low-income Massachusetts residents.

=== Cambridge funding ===
Decker has sponsored budget amendments and appropriations directing state funding to support Cambridge. In 2024, The Harvard Crimson reported that she had directed millions of dollars in state funding toward Cambridge infrastructure and other local projects. That year, Decker sponsored $1 million in state funding to reopen the Cambridge Health Alliance's Birth Center. She has also secured appropriations for the Cambridge Community Center, including $250,000 proposals for capital improvements and the expansion of its community-based behavioral health programming in both the fiscal year 2024 and fiscal year 2025 state budgets, as well as $100,000 in funding for capital programs in 2026.

=== Immigration enforcement ===
Decker was an original petitioner of the PROTECT Act, legislation introduced by Representatives Andy Vargas and Judith García that established a firewall on interactions between state and local agencies and federal civil immigration enforcement entities, such as ICE.

The legislation restricted state and local participation in federal civil immigration enforcement, limited certain agreements authorizing local participation in federal immigration enforcement, restricted civil immigration arrests in courthouses, and established statewide standards governing interactions with federal immigration authorities.

Maura Healey signed the PROTECT Act into law on August 5, 2026.

=== Legislative memberships ===
Decker is currently the co-chair of the Joint Committee on Public Health. She is also a member of the Caucus of Women Legislators. Decker has also served as chair of the Special Legislative Commission on Racial Inequities in Maternal Health, as well as chair of the Poverty Commission.

== Electoral history ==
=== 2024 Democratic primary challenge ===
In 2024, she faced a primary challenge from Evan MacKay, a labor organizer and dual degree law and graduate student at Harvard University. MacKay emphasized legislative chaos, more transparency, and internal reform of the Massachusetts House of Representatives, while Decker emphasized her experience, role in maternal health care legislation, and ability to enact policy within existing structures.

MacKay declared victory on election night after preliminary results with 99% of ballots counted showed them with a 40-vote lead. Local newspaper Cambridge Day declared the following morning that MacKay had won, though the Associated Press had not yet called the race. According to The Boston Globe, Decker herself "seemed to come close" to conceding the race in an emotional speech to supporters on election night, stating "There's a lot of tears to be had. I'm not shedding any tears.... I've had 25 incredible years of doing what I love," though she described MacKay's celebration as premature. The following day, the Cambridge Election Commission revealed an updated count with Decker ahead by 41 votes after the remaining 1% of ballots were counted. MacKay then requested a recount, which confirmed the tally.

==== 2024 Endorsements ====
Decker received the endorsements of the Massachusetts AFL-CIO, Planned Parenthood, SEIU, the Teamsters, and more than a dozen other labor unions, as well as the Massachusetts Black and Latino Caucus. She received the endorsements of Governor Maura Healey, Senator Ed Markey, and local Congressional Representatives Katherine Clark and Ayanna Pressley, and The Boston Globe.

=== 2026 Democratic primary challenge ===
In January 2026, MacKay announced they would challenge Decker in the September primary after narrowly losing in the previous cycle. Decker has received the endorsement of Boston Mayor Michelle Wu, Governor Maura Healey, who published a press release describing Decker as a "leader", and Senator Ed Markey. Cambridge Mayor Sumbul Siddiqui, and City Councillors and former Mayors Marc McGovern and Denise Simmons, have also supported Decker.

PACs, including two super PACs, have given Decker's campaign a substantial lead in campaign spending. The super PAC known as Progressive Cambridge Independent Expenditure PAC has spent almost $130,000 in support of Decker's campaign. The group's largest contributor is also a super PAC, known as the Boston Opportunity IE-PAC, which has given $85,000. Boston Opportunity has not reported fundraising since 2022; its largest donor to that point was the United Association of Journeymen and Apprentices of the Pipe Fitting Industry, which donated $100,000 to the group in 2021. Progressive Cambridge also received $35,000 in contributions from SEIU Local 509 and the Massachusetts State Council SEIU.

Five other PACs have supported Decker including the Massachusetts Nurses Association, 1199 SEIU Massachusetts PAC, and Professional Fire Fighters of Massachusetts IE-PAC.

On September 1, 2026, Marjorie Decker defeated Evan MacKay, increasing her margin of victory to 505 votes.

== Notable criticisms and disputes ==
=== Opposition to committee roll call amendment ===
Prior to 2024, Decker consistently voted along party lines against amendments to publish committee votes online. House rules currently require committee votes to be kept at the State House in the committees' respective offices and available for public inspection during regular office hours. An amendment to make committee roll call votes available on the Legislature's website has been proposed and voted down along party lines since 2011. All amendments failed to pass a large majority, with the 2021 vote failing by a vote of 41-117.

Decker since said that committee votes "should be online" and has made her committee’s votes public, along with voting for house rules in 2025 to increase voting history and public record transparency.

=== Memorial Drive closure ===
In 2020, during the coronavirus pandemic, the Massachusetts Department of Conservation and Recreation (DCR) expanded car-free hours of Riverbend Park along Memorial Drive in Cambridge to include Saturdays, in addition to the Sundays it is usually open during the summer. After considerable public debate and a Cambridge City Council vote in support of expanded hours, the DCR limited the park space to Sundays only in April 2023. In June 2023, Decker emailed constituents, stating, "I have not ever publicly or privately advocated against Saturday closings."

However, in a March 25 email released through a citizen’s public records request, Rebecca Tepper, Secretary of the Executive Office of Energy and Environmental Affairs, noted a "falling out" between Decker and fellow Representative Mike "Connelly" [sic], who supported the extended closures. Tepper twice described Decker as "staunchly opposed" to the Saturday closures.

Following these revelations, Decker publicly denied the claims, stating that "The email from Secretary Tepper does not, and never has, reflect my current position or any position I have articulated in the past. The fact is that I have never stated any personal opposition to the closure of Memorial Drive on Saturdays..." "I appreciate Secretary Tepper's clarification and apology regarding the misrepresentation of my position and look forward to continuing to talk with constituents on both sides of this issue." According to the newspaper Cambridge Day, however, Tepper's memo was consistent with the recollections of a source who was present at the meeting in which the topic was debated: "Decker was remembered as asking her colleagues to take no further action to open the park on Saturdays."

=== Berman Tabacco ===
Since 2016, Decker has worked for the class action law firm Berman Tabacco as a director of community affairs. Her role at the firm was disclosed on a required Statements of Financial Interest. Outside employment is common among Massachusetts legislators; a 2024 Boston Globe investigation found that at least half had an outside job, business interest, or other side work. In response to criticism, Decker noted that she was able to balance her responsibilities at the firm with her work as a legislator and pointed to her legislative record in responding to questions about the outside employment,Half of Mass. lawmakers hold second jobs despite full-time pay Decker has noted that Berman Tabacco works against large pharmaceutical companies, while the firm represented plaintiffs suing pharmaceutical companies over antitrust, fraud and damages. Decker's opponents have cited the employment as a potential conflict of interest. In 2026, Decker stated that she will earn $180,000 for the year from Berman Tabacco. She described her role as helping "people connect with attorneys to stand up to big corporations”, though she did not state her time commitment to the firm.

=== Use of campaign funds ===
In 2024 and 2025, news outlets including The Boston Globe and The Harvard Crimson reported on Decker's campaign expenditures. In November 2024, The Boston Globe and other media outlets reported that Decker led a delegation of 11 Massachusetts House members, including House Speaker Ron Mariano, on a trip to Cuba. The House members planned to meet with public officials, hospital staff, charitable organizations, and members of academic and research institutes to cover issues of humanitarian aid, healthcare, biomedical research, and climate resiliency in Cuba. The Globe reported that the lawmaker delegation paid a travel agency that facilitates Cuban travel $28,566. Decker stated that expenses were funded from their personal funds or, as appropriate, from campaign funds.

In February 2025, The Harvard Crimson, citing public campaign finance filings, reported that Decker's campaign spending over the past twelve years since joining the House included nearly $11,000 at the University of Massachusetts Club, more than $4,600 on parking tickets, more than $3,400 on lunches with her legislative or campaign staff, much of it at Toscano's, a Harvard Square Italian restaurant, and more than $4,400 in gifts to colleagues, including a $500 wedding gift that was later reimbursed once Decker found it wasn't allowable. Massachusetts campaign finance law allows lawmakers' candidate committees to spend campaign funds for the “enhancement of the political future” of the candidate, provided that the expenditure is not primarily for personal use.

The Harvard Crimson noted that campaign finance law in Massachusetts gives legislators enormous latitude in how they spend their donations, but observed that "Decker’s spending and fundraising efforts are an outlier." Decker told the Commonwealth Beacon that she did not claim a government per diem that legislative members are entitled to, and that she was "always very happy to spend money in [her] district and to celebrate the hard work of my staff and the people [she] work[s] with". In response to the Crimson's reporting, Decker said she regularly hosts town halls, office hours, and other constituent events and provides food and refreshments to attendees. Decker stopped using campaign funds for parking tickets after Office of Campaign and Political Finance regulations changed to bar the practice, alleging that the tickets resulted from expiring meters during work events.

In 2026, the level of independent expenditures supporting Decker's re-election drew media attention. PACs, including two super PACs, have spent substantially more in support of Decker than outside groups have spent in support of MacKay. The Progressive Cambridge Independent Expenditure PAC has spent almost $130,000 in support of Decker's campaign. The PAC's largest contributor is the Boston Opportunity IE-PAC, which has given $85,000. Boston Opportunity has not reported fundraising since 2022; its largest donor to that point was the United Association of Journeymen and Apprentices of the Pipe Fitting Industry, which donated $100,000 to the group in 2021. Progressive Cambridge also received $35,000 in contributions from Marlborough-based SEIU Local 509 and the Massachusetts State Council SEIU.

According to Cambridge Day, Decker was not in communication with Progressive Cambridge. Decker told the newspaper she was "not surprised" that its funders included "progressive unions which [she] had worked with", citing an amendment aimed at preventing layoffs of Department of Mental Health workers, who are represented by SEIU Local 509, as well as her advocacy for Harvard custodians represented by SEIU 32BJ during contract negotiations. Five other PACs have supported Decker including the Massachusetts Nurses Association, 1199 SEIU Massachusetts PAC, and Professional Fire Fighters of Massachusetts IE-PAC.

== Personal life ==
Marjorie Decker has two children, whom she would drive to school while working as a lawmaker.

== See also ==
- 2019–2020 Massachusetts legislature
- 2021–2022 Massachusetts legislature
