= 2008 Massachusetts Senate election =

- November 4, 2008

All 40 seats in the Massachusetts Senate 21 seats needed for a majority
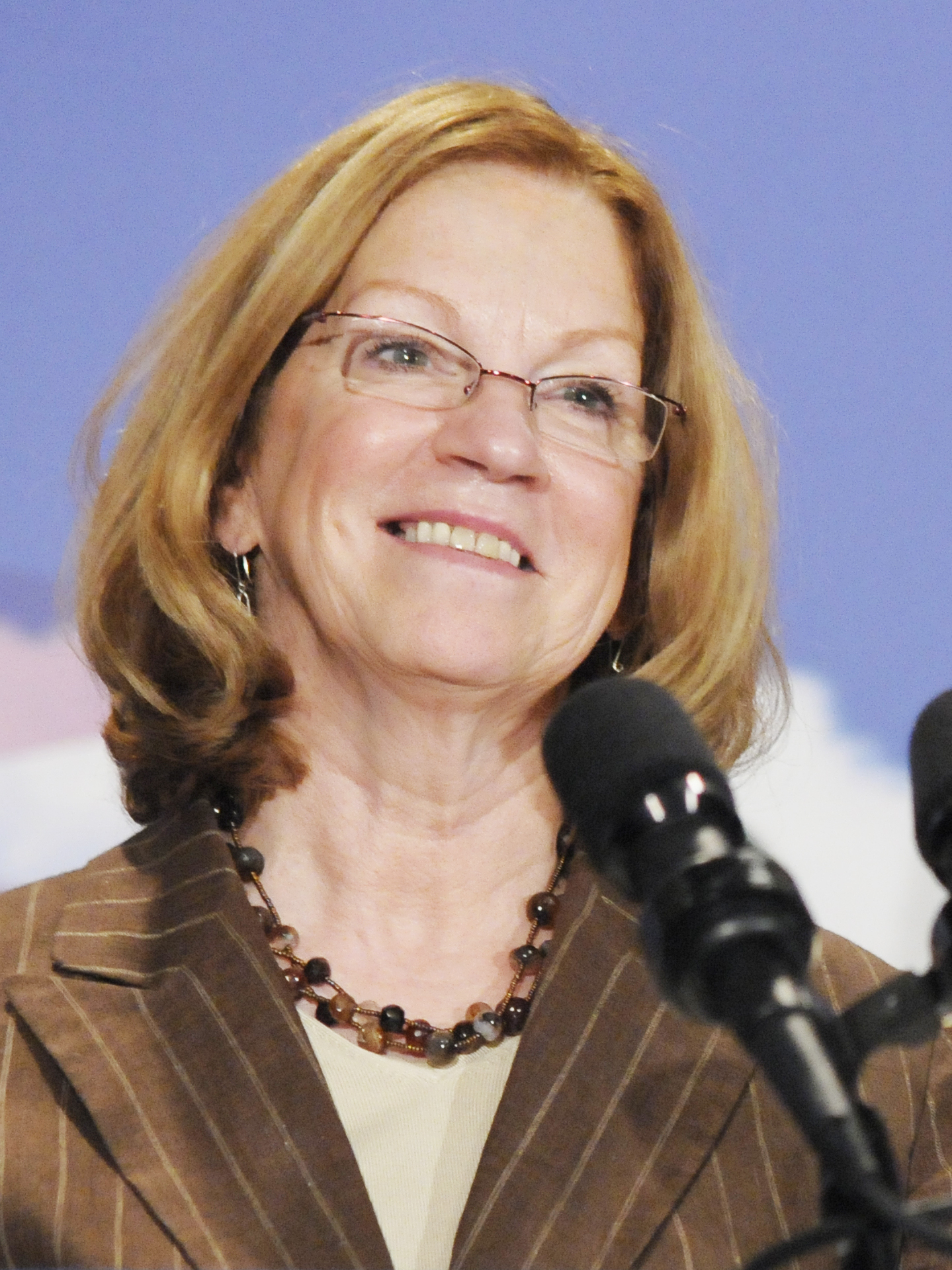

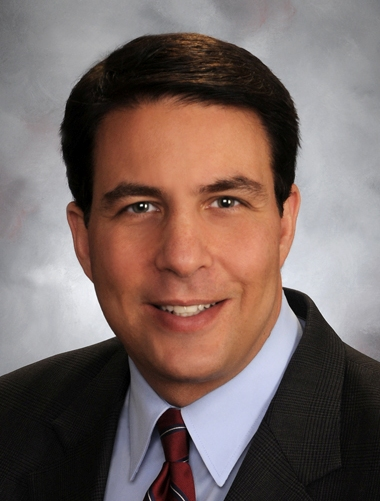
	Majority party	Minority party
Leader	Therese Murray	Richard Tisei
Party	Democratic	Republican
Leader since	March 21, 2007	January 3, 2007
Leader's seat	Plymouth and Barnstable	Middlesex and Essex
Last election	35 seats	5 seats
Seats won	35	5
Seat change	Steady	Steady
- Results: Democratic hold Republican hold
President before election
Therese Murray
Democratic
Elected President
Therese Murray
Democratic

Elections to the 187th Massachusetts State Senate was held on November 4, 2008, the same date as the 2008 Massachusetts House election as well as Federal and Congressional elections. Massachusetts Senators serve two-year terms.

== Predictions ==
Source	Ranking	As of
Stateline	Safe D	October 15, 2008

== Results ==
District	Incumbent	Competing candidates	2008 Result	2006 Winner %
Berkshire, Hampshire and Franklin	Benjamin Downing (D-Pittsfield)	Benjamin Downing (D-Pittsfield)		70.8%
Bristol and Norfolk	James Timilty (D-Walpole)	James Timilty (D-Walpole); Jon Rockwood (R-Walpole)		60.5%
1st Bristol and Plymouth	Joan Menard (D-Somerset)	Joan Menard (D-Somerset)		99.2%
2nd Bristol and Plymouth	Mark Montigny (D-New Bedford)	Mark Montigny (D-New Bedford)		82.1%
Cape and Islands	Robert O'Leary (D-Barnstable)	Robert O'Leary (D-Barnstable)		63.3%
1st Essex	Steven Baddour (D-Methuen)	Steven Baddour (D-Methuen)		98.7%
2nd Essex	Frederick Berry (D-Peabody)	Frederick Berry (D-Peabody)		99.0%
1st Essex and Middlesex	Bruce Tarr (R-Gloucester)	Bruce Tarr (R-Gloucester)		99.1%
2nd Essex and Middlesex	Susan Tucker (D-Andover)	Susan Tucker (D-Andover)		99.0%
3rd Essex and Middlesex	Thomas M. McGee (D-Lynn)	Thomas M. McGee (D-Lynn)		99.1%
Hampden	Stephen Buoniconti (D-West Springfield)	Stephen Buoniconti (D-West Springfield)		99.0%
1st Hampden and Hampshire	Gale D. Candaras (D-Wilbraham)	Gale D. Candaras (D-Wilbraham)		59.6%
2nd Hampden and Hampshire	Michael Knapik (R-Westfield)	Michael Knapik (R-Westfield)		98.8%
Hampshire and Franklin	Stanley Rosenberg (D-Amherst)	Stanley Rosenberg (D-Amherst); Keith C. McCormic (R-Greenfield)	Rosenberg (D) 78.35% McCormic (R) 15.31% Others 6.34%	84.6%
1st Middlesex	Steven Panagiotakos (D-Lowell)	Steven Panagiotakos (D-Lowell)		75.8%
2nd Middlesex	Pat Jehlen (D-Somerville)	Pat Jehlen (D-Somerville)		98.1%
3rd Middlesex	Susan Fargo (D-Lincoln)	Susan Fargo (D-Lincoln); Sandra Martinez (R-Chelmsford)		63.9%
4th Middlesex	J. James Marzilli Jr. (D-Arlington)	Brion Cangiamila (R-Billerica); Ken Donnelly (D-Arlington)		98.6%
Middlesex and Essex	Richard Tisei (R-Wakefield)	Richard Tisei (R-Wakefield)		98.5%
1st Middlesex and Norfolk	Cynthia Stone Creem (D-Newton)	Cynthia Stone Creem (D-Newton)		99.2%
2nd Middlesex and Norfolk	Karen Spilka (D-Ashland)	Karen Spilka (D-Ashland)		98.2%
Middlesex, Suffolk and Essex	Anthony Galluccio (D-Cambridge)	Anthony Galluccio (D-Cambridge)		99.0%
Middlesex and Worcester	Pamela Resor (D-Acton)	James Eldridge (D-Acton); Steven Levy (R-Marlborough)	James Eldridge (D)	58.5%
Norfolk, Bristol and Middlesex	Scott Brown (R-Wrentham)	Scott Brown (R-Wrentham); Sara Orozco (D-Needham)		98.1%
Norfolk, Bristol and Plymouth	Brian Joyce (D-Milton)	Brian Joyce (D-Milton)		75.3%
Norfolk and Plymouth	Michael W. Morrissey (D-Quincy)	Michael W. Morrissey (D-Quincy)		98.9%
Plymouth and Barnstable	Therese Murray (D-Plymouth)	Therese Murray (D-Plymouth)		98.7%
1st Plymouth and Bristol	Marc Pacheco (D-Taunton)	Marc Pacheco (D-Taunton)		99.1%
2nd Plymouth and Bristol	Robert Creedon Jr. (D-Brockton)	Thomas P. Kennedy (D-Brockton)		99.4%
Plymouth and Norfolk	Robert Hedlund (R-Weymouth)	Robert Hedlund (R-Weymouth)		64.4%
1st Suffolk	John Hart Jr. (D-Boston)	John Hart Jr. (D-Boston); Althea Garrison (I-Boston)		98.8%
2nd Suffolk	Dianne Wilkerson (D-Boston)	Sonia Chang-Diaz (D-Boston); William Theodore Leonard (Socialist Workers-Boston)	Sonia Chang-Diaz (D)	71.3%
1st Suffolk and Middlesex	Anthony Petruccelli (D-Boston)	Anthony Petruccelli (D-Boston)		98.8%
2nd Suffolk and Middlesex	Steven Tolman (D-Boston)	Steven Tolman (D-Boston)		99.0%
Suffolk and Norfolk	Marian Walsh (D-Boston)	Marian Walsh (D-Boston)		68.7%
1st Worcester	Harriette Chandler (D-Worcester)	Harriette Chandler (D-Worcester)		72.9%
2nd Worcester	Edward M. Augustus Jr. (D-Worcester)	Stephen W. Baer (GR-Shrewsbury); John I. Lebeaux (R-Shrewsbury); Michael Moore (D-Millbury)	Michael Moore (D)	67.5%
Worcester, Hampden, Hampshire and Franklin	Stephen Brewer (D-Barre)	Stephen Brewer (D-Barre)		99.6%
Worcester and Middlesex	Robert Antonioni (D-Leominster)	Jennifer Flanagan (D-Leominster)		99.2%
Worcester and Norfolk	Richard T. Moore (D-Uxbridge)	Richard T. Moore (D-Uxbridge)		99.2%

== See also ==
- 2009–2010 Massachusetts legislature
- List of Massachusetts General Courts
