= Thomas Danehy =

Cambridge mayor

Thomas W. Danehy

Mayor of Cambridge, Massachusetts
- In office 1978–1979
- Preceded by: Alfred Vellucci
- Succeeded by: Francis Duehay

Personal details
- Born: 1929
- Died: 2000 (aged 70–71) Cambridge, Massachusetts
- Occupation: Pharmacist

Thomas W. Danehy (1929–2000) served as Cambridge mayor in 1978 and 1979, and on Cambridge City Council between 1965 and 1989.

His mother was Josephine Lynch, a special education teacher. His father was Edward Danehy, superintendent of Cambridge schools. They were married at St. John's Church. His sister was Eugenia Foley, and his brother John Danehy, who went on to become Middlesex County Commissioner. Thomas Danehy married Margaret Quinn.

A trained pharmacist, Danehy owned and operated Lynch Drugstore on Massachusetts Avenue for four decades. It had previously been owned and operated by his maternal uncle John D. Lynch, who also served as a Cambridge city councilor and mayor.

In 1979, the city of Cambridge advertised in the Cambridge Chronicle that the Danehys owed $38,762 in delinquent back taxes on the 2394-2400 Massachusetts Avenue property.

As a politician, he was known as an independent, which in Cambridge meant that he was "one of the council's most conservative members." Danehy opposed rent control. He voted "present" on a city council vote to end the Vietnam War. He opposed the expansion of the Red Line to Alewife, insisting that it would lead to an increase in crime and traffic in North Cambridge. He also voted against making Cambridge a "sanctuary city" in 1985.

In 1968, after a Harvard Crimson article referred to Cambridge city councilor Al Vellucci as a "pain in the ass" and "bastard-saint," Danehy protested and requested a formal apology. Speaking of the relationship between Harvard and the city of Cambridge, Danehy said it was "like a menstrual cycle--it goes over and over again."

Danehy jogged regularly at Fresh Pond.

Cambridge's Danehy Park, formerly a brickyard and landfill, is named after Danehy.

Danehy died in 2000. His funeral was held at St. John's Church on Massachusetts Avenue. A fellow former city councilor remembered him as "one of the last vestiges of the old North Cambridge."
