= Edward J. Sullivan =

American politician

Clerk of Courts for Middlesex County, Massachusetts
- In office 1959–2006
- Preceded by: Charles T. Hughes
- Succeeded by: Michael A. Sullivan

Mayor of Cambridge, Massachusetts
- In office 1956–1957
- Preceded by: John J. Foley
- Succeeded by: Tom McNamara

Member of the City Council of Cambridge, Massachusetts
- In office 1949–1959

Personal details
- Born: 1921 Cambridge, Massachusetts
- Died: July 24, 2007 (aged 85–86) Cambridge, Massachusetts
- Resting place: Cambridge Cemetery
- Party: Democratic
- Spouse: Jacqueline S. Scully
- Parent(s): Michael (Mickey the Dude) and Mary (Hart) Sullivan

Military service
- Branch/service: United States Navy
- Battles/wars: World War II *South Pacific

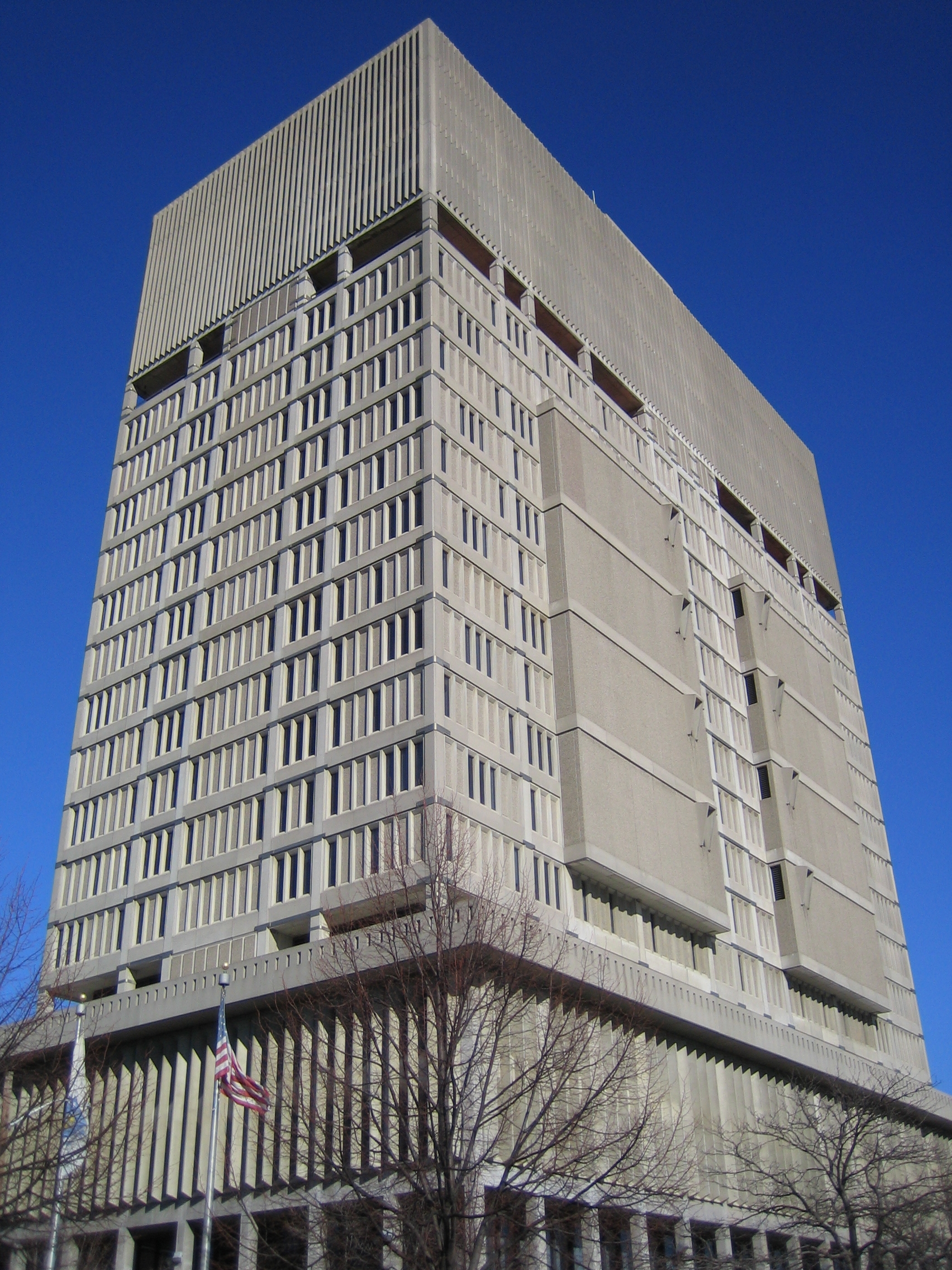
Formerly the Edward J. Sullivan Courthouse

Edward J. Sullivan (1921 – July 24, 2007) was clerk of courts for Middlesex County, Massachusetts and mayor of Cambridge, Massachusetts. Edward's brother, Walter J. Sullivan also served as Mayor of Cambridge, as did his nephew, Michael. As clerk of courts, he instituted the one-day–one-case jury system. He was succeeded as clerk of courts by his nephew, Michael A. Sullivan, after holding the position for 48 years. The former Middlesex Superior Court building was named the Edward J. Sullivan Courthouse in his honor.

Political offices
Preceded by John F. Foley	Mayor of Cambridge, Massachusetts; 1956 - 1957	Succeeded by Tom McNamara
Preceded by Charles T. Hughes	Clerk of Courts for Middlesex County, Massachusetts; 1959 - 2006	Succeeded by Michael A. Sullivan
