= Michael A. Sullivan (politician) =

American politician

Clerk of Courts for Middlesex County, Massachusetts
- Incumbent
- Assumed office January 2007
- Preceded by: Edward J. Sullivan

Mayor of Cambridge, Massachusetts
- In office 2002–2005
- Preceded by: Anthony Galluccio
- Succeeded by: Kenneth Reeves

Member of the Cambridge City Council
- In office January 1993 – August 17, 2007
- Preceded by: Walter J. Sullivan
- Succeeded by: David P. Maher

Personal details
- Born: Michael Anthony Sullivan; August 26, 1959 (age 65)
- Political party: Democratic
- Spouse: Denise Morris
- Children: 2
- Education: Boston College (BA, JD)

Michael Anthony Sullivan (born August 26, 1959) is an American politician, lawyer, and civil servant serving as the Clerk of Courts for Middlesex County, Massachusetts. Sullivan also served two terms as mayor of Cambridge, Massachusetts.

== Early life and education ==
Michael is a member of the Sullivan family of Cambridge. He is the third person in his family to be the mayor of Cambridge following his father and grandfather. He is a graduate of Boston College and Boston College Law School.

== Career ==
Sullivan served fourteen years as a member of the Cambridge City Council. During his tenure, Sullivan was also selected to serve as mayor. Sullivan previously worked as an Assistant District Attorney in the Middlesex County District Court from 1986 to 1991 and Assistant Attorney General from 1991 to 1994. He also served as Of Counsel for Bellotti & Barretto, P.C. from 1996 to 2006 and as an Assistant Clerk Magistrate, pro term from 1985 to 1986. He is a former member of the Cambridge Democratic City Committee for Ward 10. He is the president of the M.A. Sullivan Trucking Company in Cambridge. He is a former member of the Saint Peter School Board and is now chair of the board.

He resigned his post as Cambridge City Councillor, effective August 17, 2007 and was replaced by David Maher on September 5, 2007.

Elected in 2006 to his first term, Sullivan ran unopposed and was elected to his second term in 2012 as Clerk of Courts of the Middlesex Superior Court. As Clerk Magistrate, he oversees the filing, procedure, and ultimate disposition of the approximately 5000 civil and 1800 criminal cases that commence each year in the Woburn and Lowell court locations. He manages the day-to-day operations of 17 full-time courtrooms and the duties of over 60 employees. He also presides over the arraignments and pretrial procedures of all criminal cases that have commenced in the grand jury of Middlesex County.

Sullivan ran unsuccessfully for Middlesex County District Attorney in 1998 and 2014.

== Personal life ==
He is married to Denise (née Morris). They have two sons.
