= Thomas M. Hodgson =

Sheriff of Bristol County, Massachusetts

Tom Hodgson
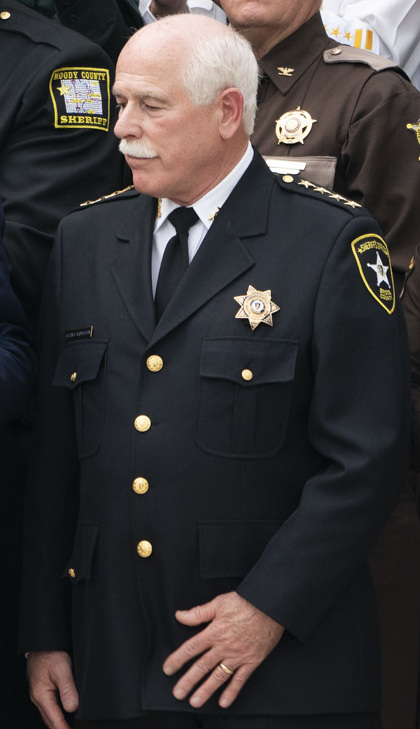

Sheriff of Bristol County
- In office June 2, 1997 – January 4, 2023
- Preceded by: David Nelson
- Succeeded by: Paul Heroux

Personal details
- Born: c. 1954 (age 71–72)
- Party: Republican
- Spouse(s): Terry; Jo-Anne (c. 1999–present)
- Education: Xavier University (did not complete)

Thomas M. Hodgson is an American politician who served as Sheriff of Bristol County, Massachusetts from 1997 to 2022.

== Early life ==
Hodgson was born about 1954 and grew up in a large Catholic family in Chevy Chase, Maryland. He graduated from a Catholic military high school in Washington and attended Xavier University in Ohio for one year studying accounting. Hodgson worked as a police detective in Ocean City, Maryland, for six years until he resigned in the early-1980's to work for his brother's landscaping business. He moved to Massachusetts in 1985 and worked in an office supply company in Quincy, Massachusetts. He left to work in another brother's accounting firm.

== New Bedford city councilor ==
Hodgson was elected to the New Bedford City Council in 1988. He served until resigning to become Sheriff in 1997; at the time of his resignation, he was the council's only Republican.

== Bristol County sheriff ==
=== Election history ===
Hodgson was appointed sheriff of Bristol County by then-Governor William F. Weld on May 21, 1997. He won election to a full six-year term in 1998 and moved to Fall River the next year. He garnered press for charging inmates for room and board, medical services and hair cuts while in jail and for getting rid of televisions and the weight room. He instituted chain gangs. In the 2016 election, he ran unopposed.

Outgoing Governor Charlie Baker supported Hodgson in his 2022 reelection campaign. Hodgson conceded the election to his opponent, Attleboro Mayor Paul Heroux.

=== Immigration ===
In 2017, Hodgson offered to send detainees from Bristol County as forced laborers to build President Donald Trump's proposed border wall. When he was later invited to speak to a U.S. House of Representatives committee about sanctuary cities, he recommended that elected officials in such jurisdictions should be arrested.

On August 7, 2019, Hodgson sent an email to Trump adviser, Stephen Miller, reporting that his church, St. Julie's Billiart Parish in Dartmouth, MA, was providing information to immigrants regarding their legal rights:

"Stephen, thought you might like to see samples of cards I discovered in a holder at the back of St. Julie's Church in Dartmouth, MA."

"While attending mass last Sunday, I noticed a holder on a table near the entrance marked, "ICE-Immigration" and noticed the three stacks of colored cards. Trying to determine if this is an isolated situation or a common occurrence in other parish churches,"

— Thomas M. Hodgson, Email to Stephen Miller, senior advisor to President Trump. (August 7, 2017 12:41 p.m.)

The email was released as part of a large email leak released to the Southern Poverty Law Center of Stephen Miller's emails focused on Miller's far right attitudes towards race and immigration.

==== ICE Detention Center ====
On May 1, 2020, three Immigration and Customs Enforcement (ICE) detainees were hospitalized following a violent incident with correctional officers during testing for COVID-19. Hodgson was on site during the incident and the Bristol County Sheriff's department reported more than $25,000 of damage to the facility.

The next day, Congressman Joe Kennedy III called for an independent investigation of the violence; then Senators Warren and Markey and Representative Keating joined Kennedy in signing a joint letter calling for an investigation "by an external entity." The ACLU of Massachusetts sued the Bristol County Sheriff's Office after being denied access to records related to the incident. A Massachusetts Attorney General report concluded in December 2020 that Sheriff Hodgson violated the civil rights of the detainees by using excessive force and recommended the US Department of Homeland Security (DHS) terminate its contract between Immigration and Customs Enforcement and Bristol County. In May 2021, DHS agreed with the Massachusetts Attorney General and terminated the contract. Hodgson called the report politically motivated.

Following the release of the Attorney General's report, the Department of Homeland Security terminated its 287(g) contract with the Bristol County Sheriff's Office. DHS Secretary Alejandro Mayorkas wrote: "Allow me to state one foundational principle: we will not tolerate the mistreatment of individuals in civil immigration detention or substandard conditions of detention."

=== Suicides in Bristol County Jails ===
A report from 2017 found that between 2012 and 2016, Bristol County jails accounted for a quarter of all jail suicides in Massachusetts, despite housing only 13% of inmates in the state. In October 2022, Adam Howe, a 34-year-old man from Truro, killed himself in an Ash Street Jail cell while awaiting trial for the murder of his mother. In a WBSM radio interview, Sheriff Hodgson praised his staff for going "above and beyond" the required mental health protocols. However, it was later revealed through a leaked document that Hodgson's staff were responding to a different suicide attempt 6 minutes before Howe's suicide.

Following public scrutiny, Hodgson ordered an internal investigation into seven deaths that occurred in 2015 and 2017. It was determined that the staff had acted appropriately.

In 2018, inmates suffering from mental illness filed a class-action lawsuit against Hodgson, alleging they had "suffered severe harm as the result of their confinement in solitary confinement or 'segregation.'" Hodgson denied the allegations, stating that the inmates were being used by lawyers to further a political agenda of regulating solitary confinement more closely.

=== Support for Trump presidency ===
In November 2019, President Trump appointed Hodgson an honorary chair of his 2020 Massachusetts reelection campaign. Following the 2020 election, Hodgson spread unsupported claims that Trump lost reelection due to voter fraud. In August 2023, President Trump appointed Hodgson as chair of his 2024 Massachusetts Presidential campaign.

=== Controversies ===
In Thomas Hodgson's official Bristol County Sheriff portrait from 2003, he is wearing a tie that resembles the Confederate flag. In 2020, community groups called for his resignation over his ties to white supremacy. Hodgson denied the tie was connected to the Confederacy and said he would continue to wear the necktie. Senator Ed Markey tweeted, "No one, especially someone in law enforcement, should be wearing confederate symbols and doubling down on them when called out about it."

In 2014, Hodgson's daughter was taken into custody by New Bedford police for interfering with an investigation of a shooting, claiming "Do you know that my father's the sheriff?" The case against the 29-year-old was later dropped, the prosecutor stating to the judge that he was "nol prossing" the charge.

In August 2017, Hodgson was photographed at New Bedford's Feast of the Blessed Sacrament holding a cup of Madeira wine and carrying a firearm while wearing a Bristol County Sheriff's Office shirt. Community members called for Hodgson to be fined for carrying a firearm while drinking alcohol. Hodgson claimed he did not break any laws because he was not under the influence of alcohol after drinking Madeira wine.

In February 2019, the Massachusetts State Auditor, Suzanne Bump, released a report finding that under Hodgson's leadership, the Bristol County Sheriff's Office did not transfer US$348,922 (equivalent to $439,388 in 2025) in reimbursements from Immigration and Customs Enforcement back to the state treasurer.

Hodgson is on the advisory board of the Federation for American Immigration Reform, a group the Southern Poverty Law Center describes as a hate group for its white supremacist and anti-immigrant stances.

== See also ==
- Ash Street Jail
