= Kenneth Reeves =

American politician

Mayor of Cambridge, Massachusetts
- In office 2006–2007
- Preceded by: Michael A. Sullivan
- Succeeded by: E. Denise Simmons
- In office 1992–1995
- Preceded by: Alice Wolf
- Succeeded by: Sheila Russell

Personal details
- Born: 1951 (age 74–75) Detroit, Michigan, U.S.
- Party: Democratic
- Education: Harvard College (B.A.); University of Michigan Law School (J.D.)
- Occupation: Attorney, politician

Kenneth E. Reeves (born 1951) is an American politician who served as the mayor of Cambridge, Massachusetts, United States, from 1992 to 1995 and again from 2006 to 2007. Reeves is the first openly gay African-American man to have served as mayor of any city in the United States.

== Personal life ==
Reeves was born to Jamaican parents in Detroit, Michigan. Reeves attended Detroit's public schools, graduating from Cass Technical High School in 1968. After one year at Trinity College in Hartford, Connecticut, Reeves transferred to Harvard University. At Harvard, Reeves would meet his longtime partner, Gregory Johnson.

Reeves earned his degree in American history and literature from Harvard 1973. In 1976, Reeves graduated from the University of Michigan Law School.

In 1994, when rent control in Massachusetts was repealed, Reeves was still living in the same rent controlled apartment he first rented in the 1970s as a student at Harvard.

== Political career ==
=== Cambridge politics ===
Reeves was elected Mayor of Cambridge in January 1994. Cambridge's elections are non-partisan, but he identifies himself with the Democratic Party. While mayor, he was a member of the Mayors Against Illegal Guns Coalition, an organization formed in 2006 and co-chaired by New York City mayor Michael Bloomberg and Boston mayor Thomas Menino.

Reeves stopped paying the annual fee to the Massachusetts Bar in 1998 and therefore is suspended from practicing law. He stated that he does not see the logic in paying the Bar while he is not actively practicing law.

Reeves was succeeded as mayor in 2008 by E. Denise Simmons, who became the first openly lesbian African-American mayor in the United States.

=== State politics ===
In the 2006 Massachusetts election, Reeves endorsed the gubernatorial campaign of Deval Patrick, a "longtime friend" of Reeves. Reeves additionally endorsed Tim Murray in the Democratic primary for Lieutenant Governor. In 2014, Reeves endorsed fellow Cambridge resident Leland Cheung's campaign for Lieutenant Governor.

== See also ==
- List of first African-American mayors
- List of the first LGBT holders of political offices
- List of mayors and city managers of Cambridge, Massachusetts
- 2013 Cambridge, Massachusetts municipal election

Political offices
Preceded by Alice Wolf	Mayor of Cambridge, Massachusetts; 1992 - 1995	Succeeded by Sheila Russell
Preceded by Michael A. Sullivan	Mayor of Cambridge, Massachusetts; January 2, 2006 - 2007	Succeeded by E. Denise Simmons
