= Barbara Ackermann =

American politician and activist (1925–2020)

Mayor of Cambridge, Massachusetts
- In office 1972–1973
- Preceded by: Alfred Vellucci
- Succeeded by: Walter Sullivan

Personal details
- Born: Barbara Hulley; March 1, 1925 Stockholm, Sweden
- Died: July 4, 2020 (aged 95) Lenox, Massachusetts, U.S.
- Party: Democratic
- Spouse: Paul Kurt Ackermann (1946–2011; death)
- Education: Smith College

Barbara Ackermann (1925-2020) was an American politician and activist who served on the Cambridge, Massachusetts School Committee from 1962 to 1967, the City Council from 1968 to 1977, and was Mayor from 1972 to 1973.

She was born Barbara Hulley in 1925 in Stockholm, where her father, Benjamin M. Hulley, a career foreign service officer, was then stationed. She lived her childhood in France and Ireland until briefly returning to the US in 1941.

Ackermann was an opponent of the Vietnam War and a supporter of Eugene McCarthy in the 1968 presidential election.

Ackermann was a candidate for Governor of Massachusetts in 1978. She finished behind Edward J. King and Michael Dukakis in the Democratic primary with 6.72% to King's 51.07% and Dukakis' 42.20%.

Barbara Ackermann died on July 4, 2020, in Lenox, Massachusetts, at the age of 95.
