= David Wiegand =

American journalist and short-story writer (1947–2018)

Robert David Wiegand (May 19, 1947 – April 30, 2018) was an American journalist and short-story writer, head of arts and entertainment for the San Francisco Chronicle.

== Life and career ==
Wiegand was born in Rochester, New York, where he graduated from Irondequoit High School in 1965. He earned a BA in English and an MA in journalism from American University in Washington, D.C., in 1969 and 1973.

In the 1970s, he worked at a number of local newspapers in Massachusetts, all now part of the Wicked Local media group. In 1979, he resigned as editor of the Amesbury News to run the office of State Representative Nick Costello, while continuing to write television criticism and other arts articles for North Shore Weeklies. He left the State House after about a year and became editor of the Cambridge Chronicle, then after almost ten years, managing editor of the chain, Dole Newspapers.

After moving to San Francisco in 1992, Wiegand became a temporary copyeditor on the "Datebook" section of the San Francisco Chronicle; in 1995 he became entertainment editor, overseeing the section (among other tasks, editing Sean Penn's two series of articles on Iraq and Iran) and in 2006 executive features editor, with the title of assistant managing editor. He was also the newspaper's television critic from 2010 on.

From 2008 to 2017, he co-hosted The Do List, a run-down of weekend entertainment options in the Bay Area on Public Radio station KQED, with Cy Musiker.

He was found dead of natural causes at his home on May 1, 2018, after last being seen at a performance of Tony Kushner's Angels in America on April 28. His faithful dog, Angus, was with him.

== Awards ==
- First-place award for illustration, New England Press Association
- 1996 O. Henry Award for "Buffalo Safety"
- 2012: Northern California Society of Professional Journalists award for "Television Drags Its Feet on Diversity”, San Francisco Chronicle
