= Francis Duehay =

American politician (1933–2020)

Francis H. Duehay

Mayor of Cambridge, Massachusetts

Personal details
- Born: July 1933 Washington, DC
- Died: November 20, 2020 (aged 87) Boston, MA
- Education: Harvard
- Nickname: Frank

Francis Harvey "Frank" Duehay was a three-time mayor of Cambridge, Massachusetts and was most lately the chair of the board of trustees for the Cambridge Health Alliance. He graduated from Harvard College with a degree in English in 1955, a master's degree in the Teaching of English from Harvard University in 1958, and an EdD in Educational Administration from Harvard in 1968.

== Early life and career ==
Born in Washington, D.C., in late July 1933, the son of Francis Duehay and Olive Dennett, Duehay lived in Belmont and Acton before moving to Cambridge at age 8, where he grew up mostly in West Cambridge with his mother, an administrator at the First Parish in Cambridge, and his stepfather, Moncure Burke Berg, a patent attorney.

Duehay "served in the U.S. Navy from 1955–1957, taught English at Belmont Senior High School in Belmont, Massachusetts from 1958–1959, and occupied several different positions at Harvard University from 1959–1964, including Acting Director of Admissions in the Graduate School of Education 1962–1963, and Assistant Dean in the Graduate School of Education 1964-1964."

Duehay was a member of the Cambridge School Committee from 1964 to 1972. He served on the Cambridge City Council, including terms as mayor in 1980–81, 1985, and finally in 1998–99.

He married Jane Kenworthy Lewis in 1991. She is his only surviving immediate family member, and had retired in 2013 as assistant clerk for the Massachusetts Supreme Judicial Court.

Political offices
Preceded by Thomas Danehy	Mayor of Cambridge, Massachusetts; 1980–1981	Succeeded by Alfred Vellucci
Preceded by Leonard Russell	Mayor of Cambridge, Massachusetts; 1985	Succeeded by Walter Sullivan
Preceded by Sheila Russell	Mayor of Cambridge, Massachusetts; 1998–1999	Succeeded by Anthony Galluccio

== Death ==
Frank Duehay died in Beth Israel Deaconess Medical Center of acute leukemia on November 20, 2020, aged 87. He had moved a few years before with his wife, Jane Kenworthy Lewis, from the Cambridge house where he grew up to the Brookhaven at Lexington retirement community.
