= Alfred Vellucci =

American politician

Mayor of Cambridge, Massachusetts
- In office 1970–1971
- Preceded by: Walter Sullivan
- Succeeded by: Barbara Ackermann
- In office 1976–1977
- Preceded by: Walter J. Sullivan
- Succeeded by: Thomas Danehy
- In office 1982–1983
- Preceded by: Francis Duehay
- Succeeded by: Leonard J. Russell
- In office 1988–1989
- Preceded by: Walter Sullivan
- Succeeded by: Alice Wolf

Personal details
- Born: 1915 Somerville, Massachusetts
- Died: 2002 (aged 86–87) Cambridge, Massachusetts
- Resting place: Cambridge Cemetery
- Spouse: Jurina Valentino
- Children: 8

Alfred E. Vellucci (1915–2002) was an American politician who served as the mayor of Cambridge, Massachusetts. He served four non-consecutive terms as mayor, and was known for his often antagonistic relationship with Harvard University.

== Life and career ==
Vellucci was born in Somerville, Massachusetts. His father died when Vellucci was in sixth grade, and he dropped out of school soon afterwards. He initially worked as a messenger for Western Union before becoming a candy bar deliveryman. He later opened a sandwich store. He lived in East Cambridge for much of his life.

In 1951 Vellucci was elected to the Cambridge School Committee. Four years later he was elected to the Cambridge City Council. He served on the City Council for 34 years. In 1989 he was re-elected to the Cambridge School Committee for one term. He was elected to his first two-year term Mayor of Cambridge in 1971, and was also elected in 1976, 1982, and 1988. In 1991 he ran for election to the City Council but failed to win a seat. He often focused on providing services to his constituents and was skilled at grass roots campaigning. He claimed credit for promoting commercial development, such as the CambridgeSide Galleria mall.

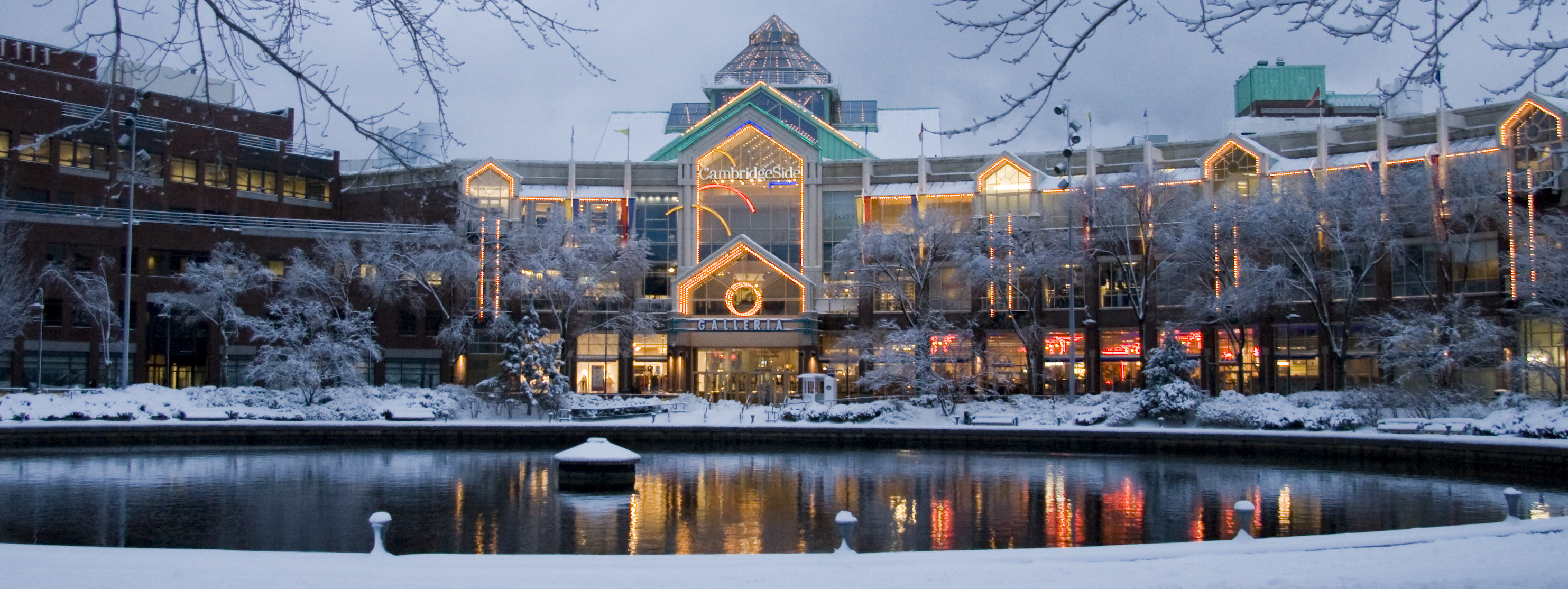
The Vellucci fountain at the CambridgeSide Galleria

While he was in office, Vellucci served as an independent and promoted both liberal and conservative policies. He supported increased public housing and rent control, but also supported corporate tax cuts. He also was openly critical of anti-war protesters during the Vietnam War. In addition, he opposed condom distribution in schools.

An Italian American, Vellucci was opposed to the idea that Leif Ericcson, rather than Christopher Columbus, discovered America. After a group of scholars from Harvard promoted the claim that Ericcson discovered America, he proposed a motion to the Cambridge City Council that officially renamed Harvard Square to Columbus Square. He also planted a large tree in front of the Harvard Lampoon Building, claiming that it was an eyesore and arguing that the Harvard Lampoon had insulted Italian Americans by claiming that the Irish discovered America. He feuded with the Harvard Lampoon for years. The paper often satirized him, one issue running an Alfred E. Neuman style picture of him on its cover. On one occasion, he unsuccessfully proposed a city ordinance declaring their headquarters a public urinal.

Vellucci often clashed with Harvard University while serving in city leadership. He frequently attempted to convince the school to offer voluntary payment in lieu of property taxes, which they were not required to pay. He also attempted to force Harvard to pay the salaries of Cambridge Police officers to deal with students. He tried to convert parking around Harvard to resident parking, and on one occasion proposed a plan that would have converted Harvard Yard into a parking lot for public buses.

In 1976, Vellucci clashed with Harvard and MIT over their plans to begin genetic engineering on recombinant DNA. He attempted to ban genetic engineering in Cambridge, where the labs for both universities were located, due to fears that scientists might accidentally create dangerous organisms. This proposed ban led to extensive hearings featuring extensive debates between scientists, including David Baltimore, and members of the Cambridge City Council. After several months the mayor allowed the proposed ban to be decided by a panel of Cambridge residents, who eventually decided against the proposed ban.

Mayor Alfred E. Vellucci Community Plaza in Inman Square is named for Vellucci. Vellucci died in Cambridge in October 2002, at the age of 87.
