= Sal DiDomenico =

American state legislator

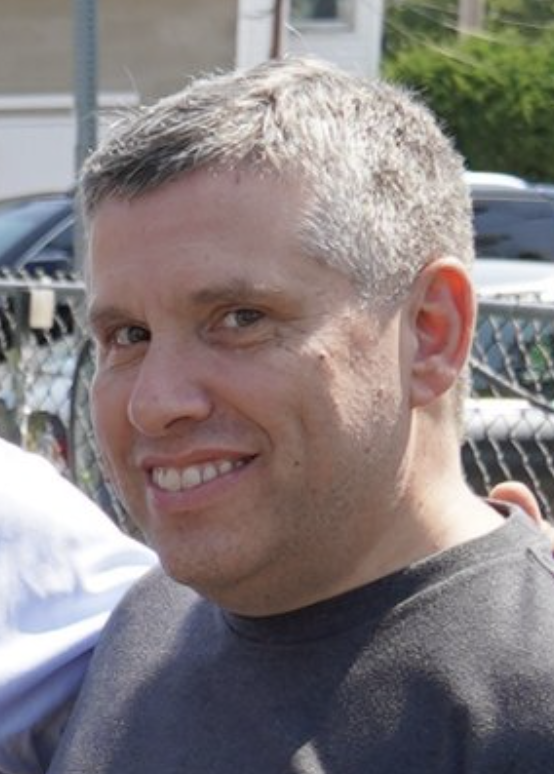

Member of the Massachusetts Senate from the Middlesex and Suffolk district
- Incumbent
- Assumed office May 20, 2010
- Preceded by: Anthony D. Galluccio

Member of the Everett City Council
- In office May 17, 2004 – May 17, 2010

Personal details
- Born: June 20, 1971 (age 55) Cambridge, Massachusetts, U.S.
- Party: Democratic
- Education: Boston College
- Occupation: State Senator
- Website: Sal DiDomenico

Sal N. DiDomenico is an American politician serving in the Massachusetts Senate since May 2010 and as Assistant Majority Leader since 2018. He is a member of the Democratic Party, representing the Middlesex and Suffolk district, which includes Everett, Chelsea, Charlestown, and parts of Cambridge.

DiDomenico was first elected in a 2010 special election after incumbent Anthony D. Galluccio resigned. Previously, he spent three years as Gallucio's chief of staff, and was a member of the Everett City Council from 2004 to 2010.

== Early life and education ==
DiDomenico was born on June 20, 1971, in Cambridge, Massachusetts. He attended Cambridge Rindge and Latin School before continuing his education at Boston College, where he earned a bachelor's degree in Business Administration in 1997.

== Political career ==
=== Everett City Council ===
DiDomenico worked for twelve years in the hospitality industry, having worked at Sonesta International Hotels and Marriot International, before his political career. DiDomenico was first elected to the Everett City Council in 2004. He served four terms in the council, and was briefly its president. After State Senator Anthony Galluccio resigned in 2010, DiDomenico resigned from his position to run for Massachusetts State Senate.

=== Massachusetts Senate ===
In May 2010, DiDomenico won the special election to succeed Galluccio and complete his term before the general election that year. At the time, the district was known as the Middlesex, Suffolk and Essex District. DiDomenico was one of four incumbents who faced primary challengers that year. On September 14, 2010, he won the Democratic primary against Timothy Flaherty with 50.68% of the vote, a margin of 190 votes. He defeated Republican nominee Barbara Bush in the general election. DiDomenico has run unopposed in every single election since.

==== Committees ====
In the 193rd General Court, DiDomenico is on the following committees:

- Chairman of the Committee on Bills in the Third Reading
- Vice Chairman of the Committee on Education
- Senate Committee on Intergovernmental Affairs
- Senate Committee on Personnel and Administration
- Senate Committee on Steering and Policy
- Joint Committee on Labor and Workforce Development

In the past, he has also served on the Senate Committees on Ways and Means and Redistricting, as well as the Joint Committees on Ways and Means, Community Development and Small Business, Consumer Protection and Professional Licensure, Financial Services, and Labor and Workforce Development.

== Electoral history ==
Massachusetts Senate, Middlesex and Suffolk District (General Election)
| Year | Democrat | Votes | Opponent | Votes |
| 2010 (Special Election) | Sal DiDomenico (D) | 3,802 | John Cesan (I) | 515 |
| 2010 | Sal DiDomenico (D) | 29,472 | Barbara Bush (R) | 8,494 |
| 2012 | Sal DiDomenico (D) | 47,586 | None | N/A |
| 2014 | Sal DiDomenico (D) | 31,575 | None | N/A |
| 2016 | Sal DiDomenico (D) | N/A | None | N/A |
| 2018 | Sal DiDomenico (D) | 46,144 | None | N/A |
| 2020 | Sal DiDomenico (D) | 59,047 | None | N/A |
| 2022 | Sal DiDomenico (D) | 33,355 | None | N/A |

From 2012 to 2022, DiDomenico ran unopposed. In 2010, DiDomenico's district was known as the Middlesex, Suffolk, and Essex District. It is now known as the Middlesex and Suffolk District.

== Issues ==
DiDomenico has filed many major pieces of legislation focusing on community development, education, children's health, election laws, human services, and public safety. He has also been recognized by over thirty organizations for his advocacy in the Legislature and was one of only 22 legislators throughout the United States to be selected as a 2015 Early Learning Fellow by the National Conference of State Legislators.

== See also ==
- 2019–2020 Massachusetts legislature
- 2021–2022 Massachusetts legislature
