= David R. Nelson (politician) =

American politician (born 1942)

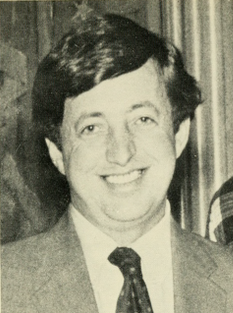

Sheriff of Bristol County, Massachusetts
- In office 1983–1997
- Preceded by: Edward Dabrowski
- Succeeded by: Thomas Hodgson

Member of the Massachusetts House of Representatives from the 12th Bristol district
- In office 1979–1983
- Preceded by: Matthew Kuss
- Succeeded by: Joseph McIntyre

Personal details
- Born: May 22, 1942 (age 84) New Bedford, Massachusetts
- Party: Democratic
- Education: Saint Mary's College
- Occupation: Rare Book Dealer; Politician

David Robert Nelson (born May 22, 1942) is an American politician who served as a State Representative and Sheriff of Bristol County, Massachusetts.

== Early life ==
Nelson was born on May 22, 1942, in New Bedford, Massachusetts. He attended New Bedford public schools, Providence College, Sacred Heart Major Seminary, and Saint Mary's College. Prior to becoming sheriff, Nelson worked as a rare book dealer.

== Early political career ==
From 1970 to 1976, Nelson was a New Bedford City Councilor. He was elected council president in 1974. From 1977 to 1978 he was City Clerk.

From 1979 to 1983, Nelson represented the 12th Bristol District in the Massachusetts House of Representatives.

== Sheriff ==
In 1983, Nelson was appointed Bristol County Sheriff by Governor Michael Dukakis following the resignation of Edward Dabrowski. He was elected to finish Dabrowski's term in 1984 by winning a five-way Democratic primary. He was elected unopposed to a full term in 1986 and won the 1992 Democratic primary with 62% of the vote. Nelson resigned in 1997 and was succeeded by his Assistant Deputy Superintendent Thomas Hodgson.
