= Sheila Russell =

American politician (1935–2022)

Mayor of Cambridge, Massachusetts
- In office 1996–1997
- Preceded by: Kenneth Reeves
- Succeeded by: Francis Duehay

Personal details
- Born: September 29, 1935; Cambridge, Massachusetts, U.S.
- Died: December 12, 2022 (aged 87); Cambridge, Massachusetts, U.S.
- Spouse: Leonard J. Russell
- Children: 5

Sheila Doyle Russell (September 29, 1935 – December 12, 2022) was an American politician who served as the 66th mayor of Cambridge, Massachusetts, and was a 14-year member of the Cambridge City Council. She retired in 1999. Russell and fellow mayor and councilman Francis Duehay were called “basically … the heart and soul” of the City Council. Her husband was himself former Cambridge mayor Leonard J. Russell.

The West Cambridge Youth Center at 680 Huron Avenue in Cambridge is named after her as the "Mayor Sheila Doyle Russell Youth and Community Center."
