= Massachusetts House of Representatives' 25th Middlesex district =

American legislative district

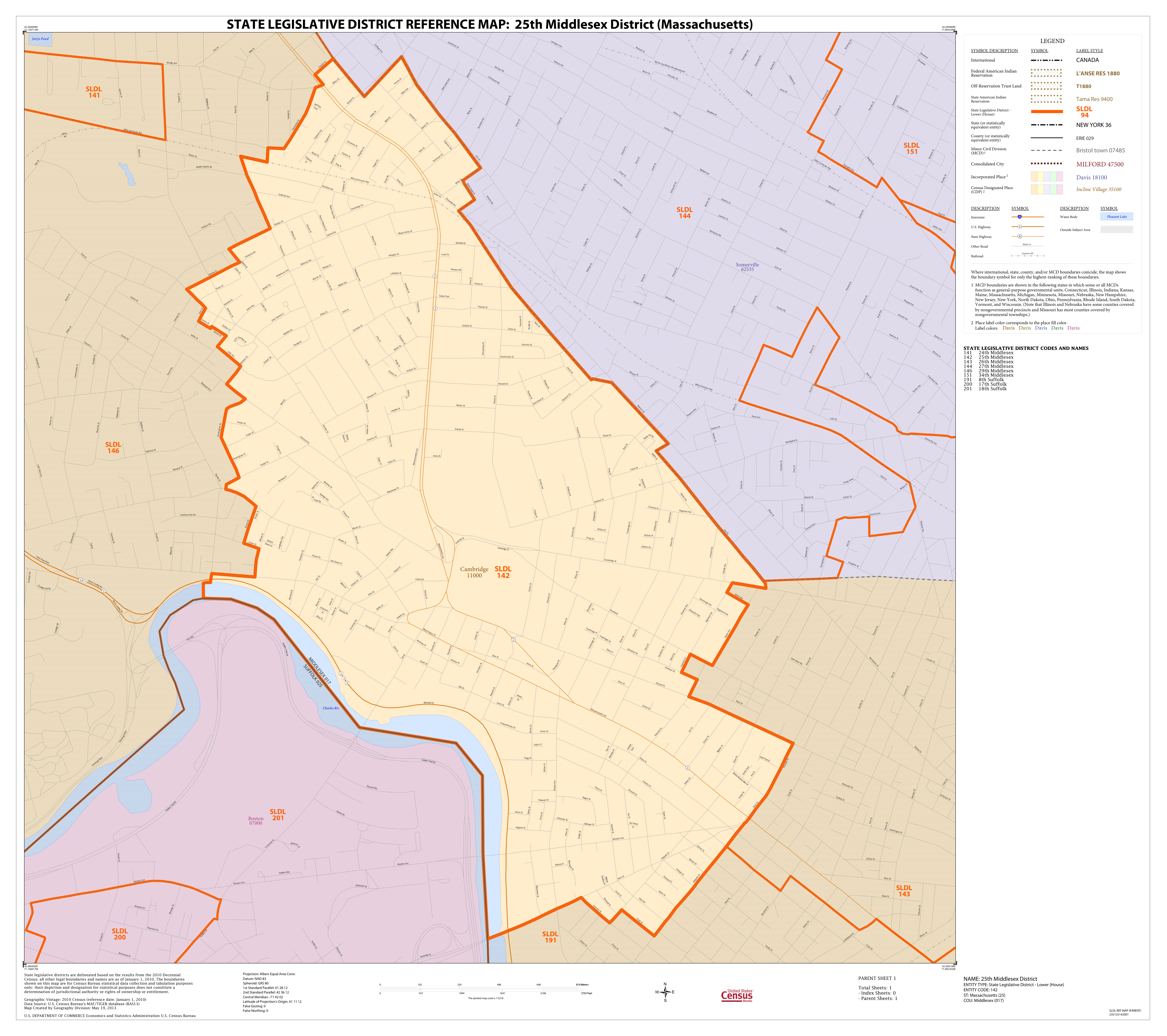
Map of Massachusetts House of Representatives' 25th Middlesex district, based on the 2010 United States census.

Massachusetts House of Representatives' 25th Middlesex district in the United States is one of 160 legislative districts included in the lower house of the Massachusetts General Court. It covers part of the city of Cambridge in Middlesex County. Democrat Marjorie Decker of Cambridge has represented the district since 2013.

The district geographic boundary overlaps with those of the Massachusetts Senate's 2nd Middlesex district, Middlesex and Suffolk district, and 1st Suffolk and Middlesex district.

== Representatives ==
This is a partial list of Representatives:

- Henry Richardson, circa 1858
- Nathan B. Edwards, circa 1859
- Albert G. Thompson, circa 1888
- Richard B. Coolidge, circa 1920
- Arthur W. Robinson, circa 1920
- James R. Doncaster, circa 1951
- James S. Conway, circa 1975
- Charles Flaherty, 1991–1996
- Alice Wolf, 1996–2013
- Marjorie Decker, 2013–

== Former locales ==
The district previously covered:

- Billerica, circa 1872
- Chelmsford, circa 1872
- Tewksbury, circa 1872

== See also ==
- List of Massachusetts House of Representatives elections
- List of Massachusetts General Courts
- List of former districts of the Massachusetts House of Representatives
- Other Middlesex County districts of the Massachusetts House of Representatives: 1st, 2nd, 3rd, 4th, 5th, 6th, 7th, 8th, 9th, 10th, 11th, 12th, 13th, 14th, 15th, 16th, 17th, 18th, 19th, 20th, 21st, 22nd, 23rd, 24th, 26th, 27th, 28th, 29th, 30th, 31st, 32nd, 33rd, 34th, 35th, 36th, 37th

== Images ==
Portraits of legislators

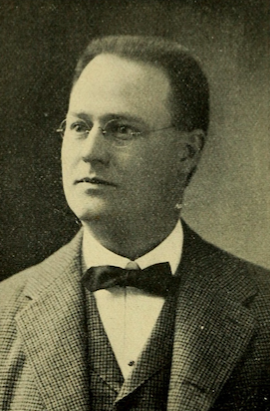
Charles Underhill

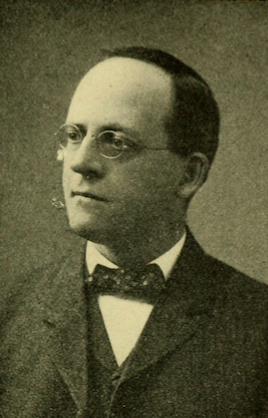
Robert Luce

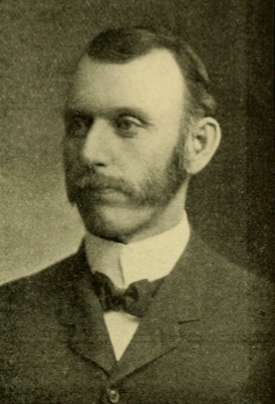
Sidney Keene

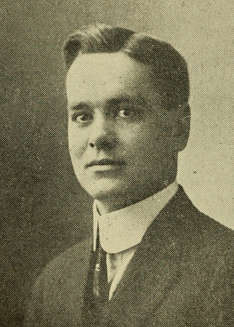
William Kneeland

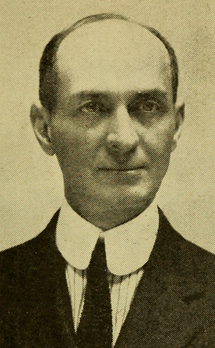
Thomas Bateman

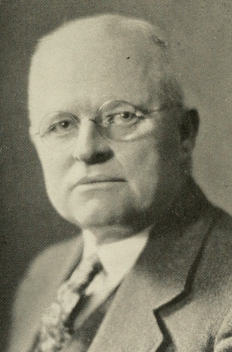
Hiram Dearborn

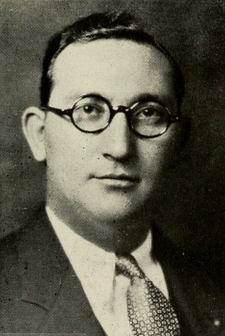
Philip Sherman

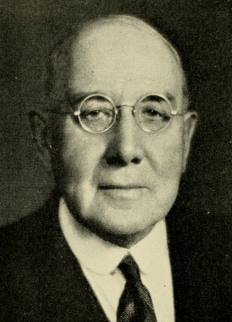
John Foster

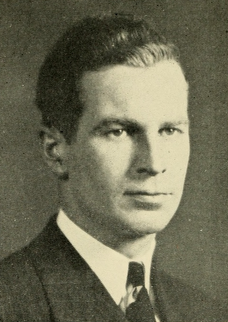
Joseph McEvoy

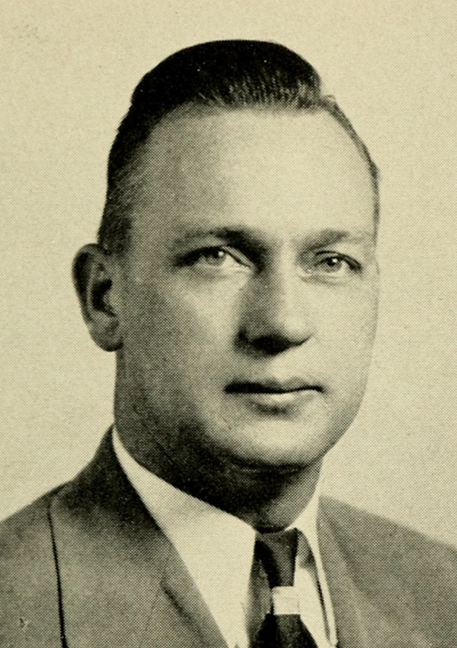
James Doncaster

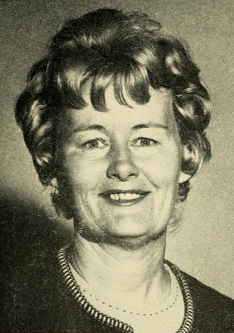
Eleanor Campobasso

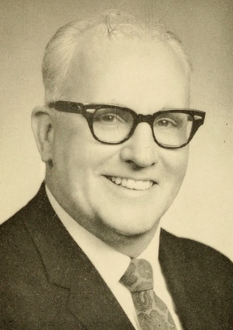
William Moran

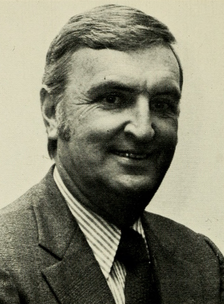
James Conway

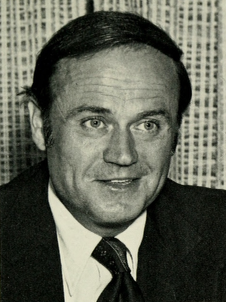
John Cusack

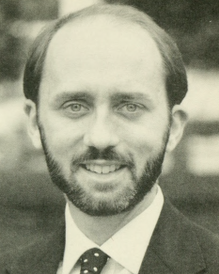
J. James Marzilli

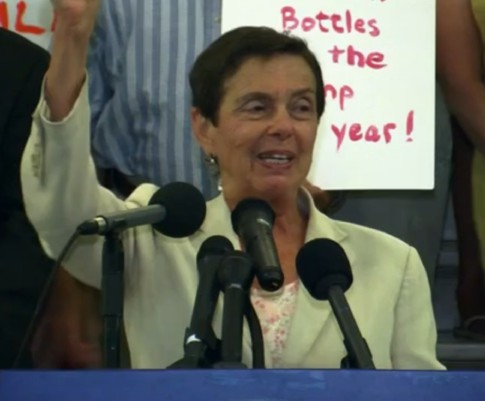
Alice Wolf
