= Paul Heroux =

American politician

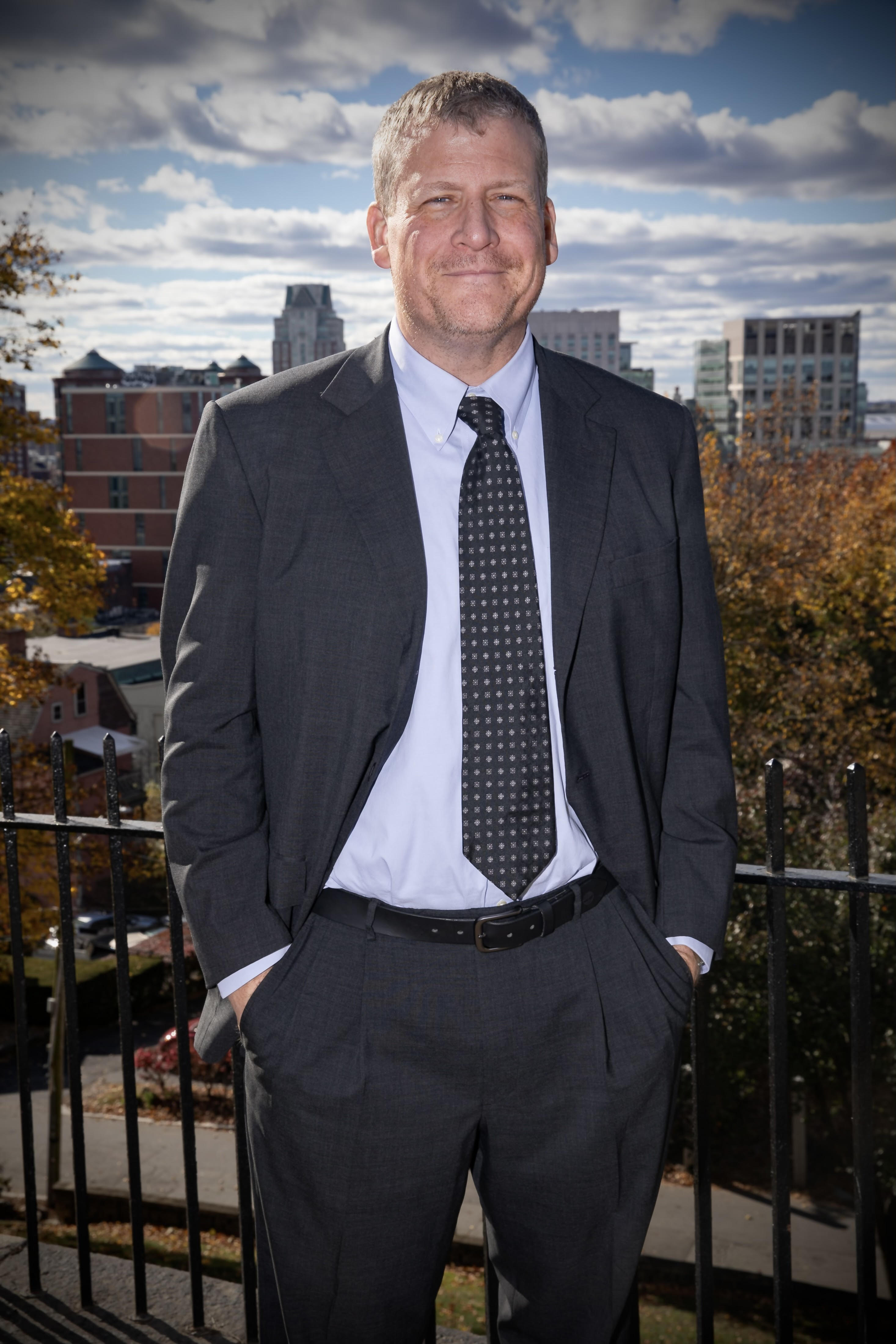

Sheriff of Bristol County
- Incumbent
- Assumed office January 4, 2023
- Preceded by: Thomas M. Hodgson

Mayor of Attleboro
- In office January 2, 2018 – January 3, 2023
- Preceded by: Kevin Dumas
- Succeeded by: Cathleen DeSimone

Member of the Massachusetts House of Representatives from the 2nd Bristol district
- In office January 5, 2013 – January 1, 2018
- Preceded by: George T. Ross
- Succeeded by: Jim Hawkins

Personal details
- Born: 1976 (age 49–50) Taunton, Massachusetts, U.S.
- Party: Democratic
- Education: University of Southern California (BA); University of Pennsylvania (MS); London School of Economics (MSc); Harvard University (MPA)
- Website: Official website

Paul Heroux (born 1976) is an American politician who is the Sheriff of Bristol County, Massachusetts. He previously served as Mayor of Attleboro, Massachusetts, and a State Representative from the Second Bristol District, elected in 2012.

== Career ==
=== State representative ===
Heroux served as a state representative from 2013–2017.

==== Electoral history ====
Paul Heroux was first elected in November 2012 as the State Representative from the Second Bristol District, Massachusetts.

- On September 6 2012, Heroux won a Democratic primary with over 78% of the vote.
- On November 7 2012, Heroux defeated Republican incumbent George T. Ross with over 58% of the vote. Representative-elect Heroux was sworn in as freshmen representative on January 2 2013.
- On November 4 2014, Heroux was elected to a second term with 61% of the vote over local businessman Bert Buckley.
- In 2016, Heroux ran unopposed for reelection and received 99.6% of the total votes cast for state representative.

==== Issues ====
Heroux's work as a state representative included creating a $38 million school internet infrastructure grant program that offered money to school districts all over Massachusetts, was a cosponsor of the transgender public accommodation bill, which is now law as the Massachusetts Gender Identity Anti-Discrimination Initiative, was a cosponsor of the ban on gay conversion therapy, which is now law, adding money to several state budgets for homeless children's programs, and fought to try to get the state to measure prison program outcomes on reducing recidivism.

=== Mayor ===
Paul Heroux served as mayor of Attleboro, MA for five years from January 2, 2018 until January 3, 2023.

==== Electoral history ====
- On September19 2017, Heroux came in first in a mayoral preliminary with 46.5% against 7-term incumbent Kevin Dumas, handing Dumas his first political defeat with 41.5%, and 12% for former fire chief Ronald Churchill.
- On November 7 2017, Heroux defeated 7-term incumbent Kevin Dumas with 54% of the vote.
- On November 5 2019, Heroux defeated challenger and city council vice president Heather Porreca 67% to 32% for the race for mayor.
- On September 21 2021, Heroux came in first in a three way preliminary obtaining 65.9% of the vote to his two competitors' 25.8% and 8.3%, respectively.
- On November 2 2021, Heroux won 66% of the vote against his opponent Todd McGhee winning a third and final term as mayor.

==== Issues ====
As mayor, Heroux pushed the redevelopment of the city center, prioritized business support, prioritized education spending by repairing roofs that leaked for 20 years, boosted education funding and created a special education stabilization fund, maintained the city's AA bond rating despite hard financial times inflicted by the COVID-19 pandemic. Heroux created a rent and mortgage assistance program for Attleboro residents who fell behind on rent and mortgage payments to help avoid evictions and foreclosures. Heroux has made efforts to recruit women and people of color fill vacancies on city boards and commissions. Heroux promoted advanced training in unconscious bias, duty to intervene to prevent excessive force, and de-escalation training for city police officers, and made sure that every firefighter has two sets of protective fire gear for the first time in city department history by funding in the budget every year. Heroux made news across the country when he implemented a strict zero tolerance policy for people who leave dogs in hot cars,

The Sun Chronicle said "Paul Heroux will surely go down as the most environmentally-conscience mayor in Attleboro’s history." During Heroux's tenure as mayor, he has taken many decidedly pro-environmental positions. These include purchasing the bankrupt privately owned Highland Country Club and turning it into the city owned Highland Park and putting a monarch butterfly population in the new park, making all city government buildings 100% wind powered, ordered city workers to use recycled paper products whenever practicable and cost effective, formed a special committee to update the city's Natural Hazards Mitigation Plan and Municipal Vulnerability Preparedness Report to prepare for the possibility of greater impact from climate change, changing all of the city street lights and city building lights to LED lights, moving the city fleet of vehicles to hybrids where possible, putting solar panels above city owned parking lots, making Attleboro a Green Community, banning single use plastic bags, banning plastic and Styrofoam take away cups and containers from restaurants and convenience stores, banning body and face washes that have plastic exfoliating beads, banning the intentional releasing of balloons into the air, banning the distribution of plastic straws, the sale of fluorescent light bulbs containing mercury and bee killing insecticides containing neonicotinoids. Heroux also submitted ordinance proposals that would triple the Wetland Protection Zone, and ban single use plastic water bottles, and plastic miniature alcohol bottles. Heroux is also seen around the city picking up litter with his dog or with groups of volunteers.

In 2017, on the day of the preliminary election, Heroux was featured by several media outlets for being bitten by a dog the day before while campaigning for mayor, his sixth dog bite in 5 years.

=== Sheriff ===
On January 10 2022, Heroux announced he is running for Sheriff of Bristol County, Massachusetts against incumbent Sheriff Thomas M. Hodgson.

- Heroux won the Democratic primary on September 6 with 41.8% of the vote, while the other two candidates received 33.5% and 24.7%.
- Heroux defeated Hodgson in the general election on November 8, 2022 with 50.9% to 49.1%.

Heroux took office on 4 January 2023. Heroux started new recruitment and retention incentives, hired an expert to review inmate suicides, released the suicide report unredacted and redesigned the bunk beds to make them more suicide resistant, which won an award for innovation in reducing inmate suicides, and offered a plan to close the Ash Street Jail, which is the oldest jail in operation in the country. Heroux created a training academy on the campus, extended the training academy for new corrections officers from eight weeks to nine weeks to add classes focused on de-escalation, dealing with mental illness, duty to intervene, and implicit bias. Heroux reduced the burden of a high commission on optional inmate commissary goods from 31.75% to 20%, a 12% reduction in what inmates pay, and started providing shower sandals to all inmates; Heroux called it "unconscionable" that inmates were forced to buy shower sandals from the commissary or go without. Crediting officers for suggesting putting air conditioning in the housing units, Heroux's team used grant money to pay for mini split air-conditioning units and is using profits from inmate commissary funds to pay for rooftop air-conditioning units.

== Personal life ==
Heroux was raised in Attleboro to small business drug store owners. He was awarded the 'Most Genuine' class superlative from his 1995 high school class for a complete abstinence to alcohol and drugs. Heroux holds two Ivy League master's degrees; one from Harvard University, a master's in Public Administration, and the other from the University of Pennsylvania, a master of science in Criminology, respectively, a master of science in International Relations from the London School of Economics, and a bachelor's degree in Psychology and Neuroscience from the University of Southern California. In 2017, Heroux published a book on US foreign policy in the Middle East, has lived in Saudi Arabia, and has been to North Korea, Israel and Palestine including the West Bank.

Prior to elected office, Heroux worked in the Philadelphia jail system, as the director of research in the Massachusetts prison system, for the national security think-tank Institute for Defense and Disarmament Studies, as an English teacher in Saudi Arabia, and with kids for seven years at a YMCA. Heroux, after earning instructor level ranks, also taught Jeet Kune Do, Filipino Kali, and Jiu Jitsu at a studio he opened at 19 years old.

From October to November 2018, Heroux took a 12-day, 8,500-mile (13,700 km) road trip across 24 states and Canada with his dog Mura, posting pictures on his Facebook page. The trip went viral after being picked up by news outlets across the United States and in dozens of countries.
