= Ash Street Jail =

Jail in New Bedford, Massachusetts

Coordinates: 41°38′01″N 70°56′06″W

Ash Street Jail and Regional Lock-Up
- Interactive map of Ash Street Jail and Regional Lock-Up
- Location: New Bedford, Massachusetts
- Status: Operational
- Opened: 1888; 138 years ago
- Managed by: Bristol County Sheriff's Office
- Director: Paul Heroux

The Ash Street Jail and Regional Lock-Up, located in New Bedford, Massachusetts, is a jail for inmates awaiting trial from Bristol County, Massachusetts. The Ash Street Jail is one of the oldest operating jails in the United States. It is a medium to a maximum-security facility. Every year this facility has 4000 bookings, with a daily average of 200 Inmates. Inmates range from low-level misdemeanor offenders to those being held and awaiting trial for violent crimes such as robbery, rape, and murder. Sheriff Paul Heroux is the current Sheriff of the facility.

The facility holds over two hundred prisoners. Most prisoners are awaiting trial, while others are serving sentences of 2 ½ years or less. The facility provides in-house programs for education and parenting courses, substance abuse programs such as Alcoholics Anonymous and Narcotics Anonymous, anger management, and religious services and Bible studies.

== History ==
The Ash Street Jail was built in 1888 on the site of the New Bedford House of Correction which was the former New Bedford County Jail built-in 1829. It is currently overseen by Bristol County Sheriff Paul Heroux. Former Sheriff Thomas M. Hodgson has been heavily criticized for having kept the 180-year-old facility open; he felt keeping the facility opened was a better idea as jail should be a place that "people don't want to return to." Due to the alleged unsafe conditions, including the absence of automatic door locks, the jail has been the subject of lawsuits. The facility has also had multiple riots, one in 1993, where more than 100 inmates set fire to several buildings in the facility as well as a riot in 1998, where inmates smashed toilets and sinks in their cells and threw excrement at guards.

== Lizzie Borden in detention while awaiting her trial ==
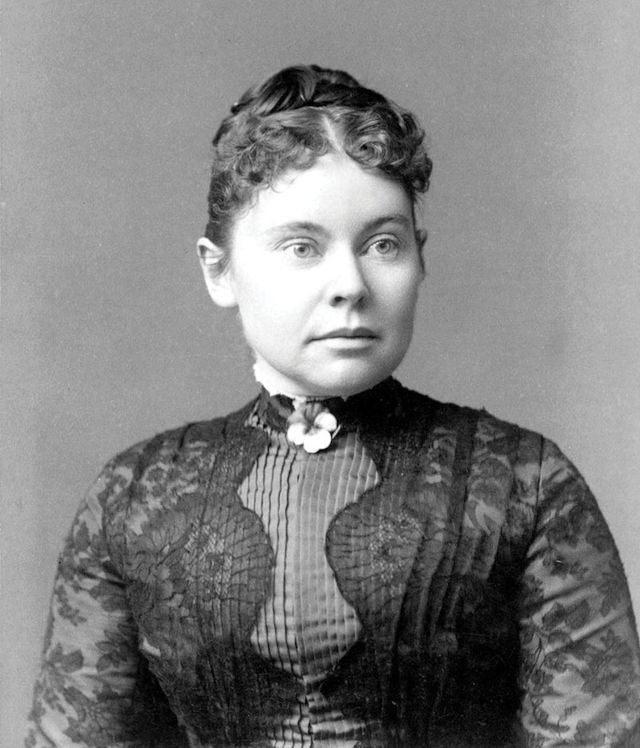
Lizzie Borden

At one point, the infamous Lizzie Borden was held and detained in the former Sheriff's Home beside the Ash Street Jail during her trial. Lizzie Borden stayed in the matrons' quarters at the Ash Street Jail, but only for the 12 days that she was on trial.
