= Cambridge Day =

Local news website in Cambridge, MA

- Type: Daily online / weekly print newspaper
- Founder: Marc Levy
- President: Raffi Freeman
- Editor: Michael F. Fitzgerald
- Board of Directors: Amira Valliani, Mary McGrath, Niko Emack, Raffi Freeman, Richard Harriman
- Founded: 2005 (original print iteration); 2009 (second iteration, as a digital outlet); 2023 (weekly print edition begins publication); 2024 (becomes nonprofit)
- Language: English
- City: Cambridge, Massachusetts
- Country: United States
- Website: www.cambridgeday.com

The Cambridge Day is a nonprofit news outlet which serves Cambridge, Massachusetts with some additional coverage of neighboring Somerville. The outlet covers municipal government, business, and education in its home area, in addition to youth sports and human-interest stories. Initially founded by Marc Levy in 2005 as a daily print newspaper, the Day was shuttered that same year before being re-founded in 2009 as an online-only news site. In 2023, the Day once again began publishing a free weekly print edition, and in 2024 it was acquired by a new nonprofit organization. Levy departed the organization in 2025 and in 2026 created a new competing news site, the Cambridge Somerville Independent.

== History ==
The first iteration of the Cambridge Day was founded by Marc Levy on October 31, 2005. The Day began as a free daily print newspaper, providing coverage of its home city. However, this first iteration was short-lived, shutting down on November 28, 2005, just under a month after its formation.

In 2009, Marc Levy re-founded the Cambridge Day as a digital news outlet. Initially, the outlet only covered Cambridge, but Levy eventually expanded its scope to include coverage of neighboring Somerville. The Day initially focused on covering municipal government, business, and real estate.

In 2022, the Cambridge Chronicle, a weekly newspaper which had published for over 175 years, effectively ceased publication after its corporate owner, Gannett, laid off the paper's last staff member. The Day was left to fill the gap.

Marc Levy was the only full time staff member for over 16 years, personally managing every facet of the newspaper. Until 2023, he did this while also working other full time journalism jobs in order to cover the costs of running the publication.

In November 2024, a nonprofit group, Cambridge News Matters, acquired the Cambridge Day. Levy was retained as a full time, salaried journalist. The acquisition came with a promise to hire more staff to be reporters and editors. Initially, the new nonprofit board committed $100,000 to expanding the newspaper.

The new nonprofit group looked at a number of ways to raise revenue, controversially including potential funding from the Cambridge city government.

In 2025, Marc Levy left the Cambridge Day after the nonprofit board decided to cut Somerville coverage to focus on Cambridge, a decision Levy disagreed with. In 2026, he formed the Cambridge Somerville Independent.
