= Mary Rogeness =

American politician (born 1941)

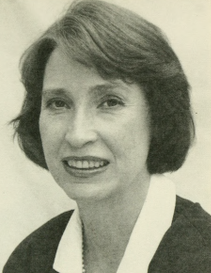

Member of the Massachusetts House of Representatives from the 2nd Hampden district
- In office 1991–2009
- Preceded by: Iris Holland
- Succeeded by: Brian Ashe

Personal details
- Born: May 18, 1941 (age 85) Kansas City, Kansas
- Party: Republican
- Education: Carleton College
- Occupation: Writer; Politician

Mary S. Rogeness (born May 18, 1941 in Kansas City, Kansas) is an American politician who represented the 2nd Hampden district in the Massachusetts House of Representatives from 1991 to 2009 and was a member of the Longmeadow School Committee from 1982 to 1988. She was first elected by defeating Mary Gail Cokkineas.

From 1999 to 2003 she was the Assistant Minority Whip and from 2003 to 2009 she was Assistant Minority Leader.
