= Brian Ashe =

American politician

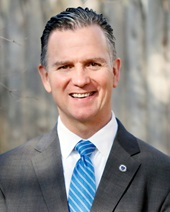

Member of the Massachusetts House of Representatives from the 2nd Hampden district
- Incumbent
- Assumed office 2009
- Preceded by: Mary Rogeness

Personal details
- Born: April 23, 1963 (age 63)
- Party: Democratic
- Spouse: Sonja M. Ashe
- Education: Westfield State College
- Occupation: Politician

Brian M. Ashe (/æʃ/, born April 23, 1963) is an American politician who represents the 2nd Hampden District in the Massachusetts House of Representatives. A member of the Democratic Party, his district includes all of Hampden and Longmeadow and part of East Longmeadow, Monson, and Springfield.

== Political career ==
Ashe entered politics with his election to the Longmeadow Select Board, where he served from 2001 to 2008.

In 2006, Ashe unsuccessfully sought the Democratic nomination for Massachusetts Senate in the 1st Hampden and Hampshire district, losing to Gale D. Candaras.

In 2008, Ashe ran to succeed Republican Representative Mary Rogeness in the 2nd Hampden district. He defeated Springfield City Councilor Kateri B. Walsh in the Democratic primary and Republican William G. Scibelli, a colleague on the Longmeadow Select Board, in the general election. Ashe became the first Democrat to represent the district in 36 years.

=== Committee assignments ===
- Vice Chair, House Committee on Bills in the Third Reading
- House Committee on Steering, Policy and Scheduling
- Joint Committee on Community Development and Small Businesses
- Joint Committee on Tourism, Arts and Cultural Development

== Personal life ==
Ashe and his wife Sonja have two children, Tiernan and Kyra. His father, Donald E. Ashe, served 35 years as Hampden County Registrar of Deeds.

== See also ==
- 2019–2020 Massachusetts legislature
- 2021–2022 Massachusetts legislature
