= Cambridge Chronicle =

Defunct newspaper serving Cambridge, MA

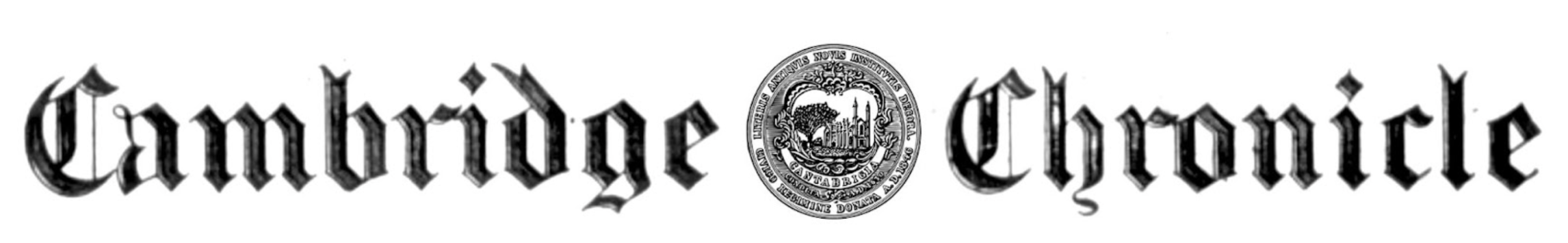

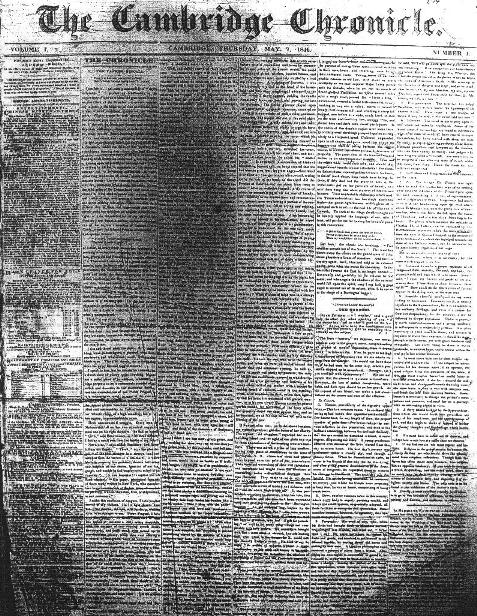
- Frontpage of the first edition, May 7, 1846
- Type: Weekly newspaper
- Owner: USA Today Co.
- Founded: May 7, 1846
- Ceased publication: 2022
- Language: English
- Headquarters: 150 Baker Avenue, Suite 201; Concord, MA 01742; United States
- OCLC number: 9406292
- Website: wickedlocal.com/cambridgechronicle

The Cambridge Chronicle was a weekly newspaper that served Cambridge, Massachusetts. The newspaper was founded by Andrew Reid in May 1846. It ceased publication of its print edition in 2022, after being purchased by Gannett. It no longer publishes stories of its own, instead re-publishing regional stories from other Gannett papers.

== History ==
=== Early Days ===
The Cambridge Chronicle was first published on May 7, 1846. A few days before, Cambridge was incorporated as a city, and Scotsman Andrew Reid seized on the opportunity to publish a weekly newspaper. Cambridge was home to the first printing press in the Colonies, and nearby Boston was home to the first newspaper. The Publick Occurrences Both Forreign and Domestick was founded in 1690, albeit short-lived. But beginning in the 18th century, Boston developed a vibrant newspaper industry.

Several newspapers were started in Cambridge. In 1775 and 1776. Cambridge was home to the New England Chronicle, earlier known as the Essex Gazette. In 1840, the Cambridge Magnolia started its two years of publication.

=== 1846 to 1896 ===
Cambridge developed a vibrant newspaper industry. The Cambridge Press was founded by James Cox in 1866. Its city editor, James W. Bean, became co-owner of the Chronicle in 1891. He set out on this venture with C. Burnside Seagrave, who had been with The Cambridge Tribune. The Cambridge Tribune from 1878 to 1966 was a competitor. It had been founded by D. Gilbert Dexter, who had worked for the Boston Journal as the Cambridge correspondent. The Cambridge News was founded by Daniel A. Buckley in 1879, who used it as a medium to promote his personal views. Since 1873, Cambridge's only daily newspaper has been The Harvard Crimson.

=== Editors ===
Years	Editor
1846–1847	Andrew Reid
1847–1857	John Ford
1858–1859	John S. Baldwin
1859–1873	George Fisher
1873–1886	Lynn Boyd Parker
1886–1890	F. Stanhorpe Hill
1890–1891	F.H. Buffum
1891–?	James W. Bean
1891–1935	C. Burnside Seagrave
1935–1939	?
1939–1971	Eliot Spalding
1971–?	?
1980–1991	R. David Wiegand
?-1991	David Boraks
1991–1992	Amy Miller
1992–1997	John Breneman
1997–2001	Ken Maguire
2001–2005	Deb Eisner
2003–2005	Michele Babineau
2005–2006	Deborah Eisner
2006	Chris Helms
2006–2012	David Harris
2012	Scott Wachtler
Nov. 2012–Oct. 2021	Amy Saltzman

The first publisher, Reid, died on January 4, 1847, and John Ford took over his role. Charles Burnside Seagrave served as editor and publisher for over 40 years, up to his retirement in 1935. Another influential editor of the paper was Eliot Spalding. He joined the Chronicle in 1926, and in 1939 became its editor, a role he held until 1971.

=== Ownership changes ===
The Dole family acquired the Cambridge Chronicle in the 1930s. They merged it with its rival paper, the Cambridge Sun, in 1935. The family sold the newspapers to Fidelity Investments in 1991. It was integrated into the Community Newspaper Company, another subsidiary of Fidelity Investment, in 1996.

The Community Newspaper Company was sold to the Boston Herald's owner, Herald Media, in 2001. It was again sold to GateHouse Media, in 2006 (GateHouse Media later changed their name to Gannett). In September 2012, the Chronicle merged with Tab Communications's Cambridge Tab.

== Production ==
The first editions were produced by hand press above the Holmes Grocery Store, on the corner of Magazine and Main Streets in Central Square. The paper is now printed in Framingham.

== End of local coverage ==
In 2022, Will Dowd, the only remaining journalist writing for the Cambridge Chronicle, moved to work for the site Marblehead News. Gannett maintains a section of its Wicked Local website for the Cambridge Chronicle, but the newspaper exists in name only. The Chronicle no longer publishes any local news stories. Instead, it cross-posts regional New England news from other parts of the Wicked Local website. This follows a broader pattern for Gannett, who announced in April 2022 that it was ending print editions of 19 different local newspapers across Massachusetts. This left Cambridge with very few dedicated reporters, a part of a long decline in the city's local news ecosystem. Local news websites like the Cambridge Day, which at the time had just one full time reporter in addition to freelancers, were left to fill the gap.
