= Massachusetts Bottle Bill =

Container-deposit legislation

Massachusetts
- Long title: Beverage Container Recovery Law
- Passed: 1982
- Commenced: 1983
- Bill citation: Mass. Bills H.2943/S.1588
- Status: In force

The Massachusetts Bottle Bill (Mass. Bills H.2943/S.1588) is a container-deposit legislation dealing with recycling in the United States that originally passed in the U.S. state of Massachusetts in 1982 as the Beverage Container Recovery Law. Implemented in 1983, the law requires containers of carbonated beverages to be returnable with a minimum return value of $0.05. The bottle bill does not cover containers of non-carbonated beverages like water, tea, or sports drinks. The law also establishes the handling fee paid by distributors to redemption centers, $0.0325 per unit as of July 5, 2013, and to retailers $0.0225 per unit. As the number of non-deposit beverage containers (water, tea, sports beverages, etc.) has increased to represent over one-third of beverage containers sold, the Bottle Bill has no influence on these non-deposit containers, with the result that these containers are three times more likely to be found as litter in Massachusetts communities. Additional studies indicate that beverage containers covered by the state's container deposit system are redeemed at approximately 70% and another 9% are recycled via curbside programs. Conversely, containers that are not covered, such as bottled water, juices, and sports drinks, are recycled at approximately 25%.

== Proposed changes ==
Since the original Bottle Deposit Law was enacted, there has been tremendous growth in the consumption of beverages exempted. Since 2000, consumption of non-carbonated beverages has demonstrated near double-digit growth and now represents over 30% of beverages sold in Massachusetts. However, as these beverage containers do not require a deposit, only 23% are recycled, compared with a recycling rate of 80% for containers requiring a deposit in the 2010 fiscal year.

Attempts to update the state's bottle bill to account for these changes have been underway since 2001, but without success.

=== 2010 proposal ===
Expansion of the Massachusetts container law was proposed in 2010 by Gov. Deval Patrick in his fiscal year 2010 budget to include a nickel deposit on water, juice, energy drink and sport drink containers.

While the proposed expansion of the bottle bill includes provisions for both deposits paid by consumers as well as handling fees paid by industry, a portion of deposits paid are expected to remain unredeemed. These forfeited deposits are paid into the Commonwealth's General Fund. Revenue from unclaimed deposits has been estimated to be around $34 million per year, prompting Governor Patrick to propose dedicating $6.5 million of this new revenue to the state's Department of Environmental Protection recycling and solid waste program. Under the proposed ballot initiative, the forfeited deposits would be directed to environmental programs.

Beverage containers make up around 15% of the waste stream in Massachusetts. According to the Massachusetts Executive Office of Energy and Environmental Affairs, updating the deposit law to expand the scope of coverage to include water, coffee-based drinks, juices and sports drinks is expected to increase the number of bottles recycled annually from 600 million (40%) to 1.2 billion (80%).

A Massachusetts Department of Environmental Protection (MassDEP) analysis of the impacts of an expanded Bottle Deposit Law for municipalities found that such an expansion would save municipalities between $4.2 and $6.9 million annually in litter abatement and avoided collection, disposal and recycling costs.

In order to address cost concerns by opponents to a proposed amendment, MassDEP conducted a survey in July 2011, to assess whether amendments to the existing Bottle Deposit Law (BDL) might lead to negative impacts on consumer prices, choice and retailer costs. The results of this survey suggest that the BDL results in no difference in beverage prices for consumers; no difference in consumer choice; and that sufficient infrastructure and capacity exists to handle the anticipated increase in the volume of beverage containers processed should the law be expanded. A 2011 study by Jeffrey Morris, Ph.D., and Clarissa Morawski for the Container Recycling Institute found that expansion of the Bottle Deposit Law would result in net gains in domestic jobs.

=== 2011 and 2013 attempts ===
In 2011, an update passed the Massachusetts Senate as a provision to the so-called "Jobs Bill." In 2013, an update passed the Massachusetts Senate as part of the state budget. Neither time was the bottle bill update taken up, or passed by the Massachusetts House of Representatives.

=== 2014 referendum ===
A referendum on the ballot in November 2014, concerned whether to expand the bill to cover containers for some non-carbonated beverages. This would have addressed growing concern over the nearly 1.4 billion containers not covered by existing legislation that are found in litter and landfill waste. The goal of the initiative petition that placed the measure on the ballot was to broaden the scope of beverage types requiring a deposit in order to be more responsive to consumer preferences as well as establishing a mechanism for stabilizing the recycling industry by tying the handling fees paid to redemption centers to the Consumer Price Index. Opponents argued that the change would increase costs and red tape for the beverage industry.

The measure was supported by environmental organizations, notably the Sierra Club's Massachusetts Chapter and the Massachusetts Public Interest Research Group (MassPIRG), along with 209 of the state's 351 municipalities. It was opposed by the American Beverage Association and several grocery store chains, which raised nearly $8 million to campaign against it. The proposed expansion was defeated, with more than 70 percent of the voters voting against it.
