= Kevin Kuros =

American state legislator

Kevin J. Kuros
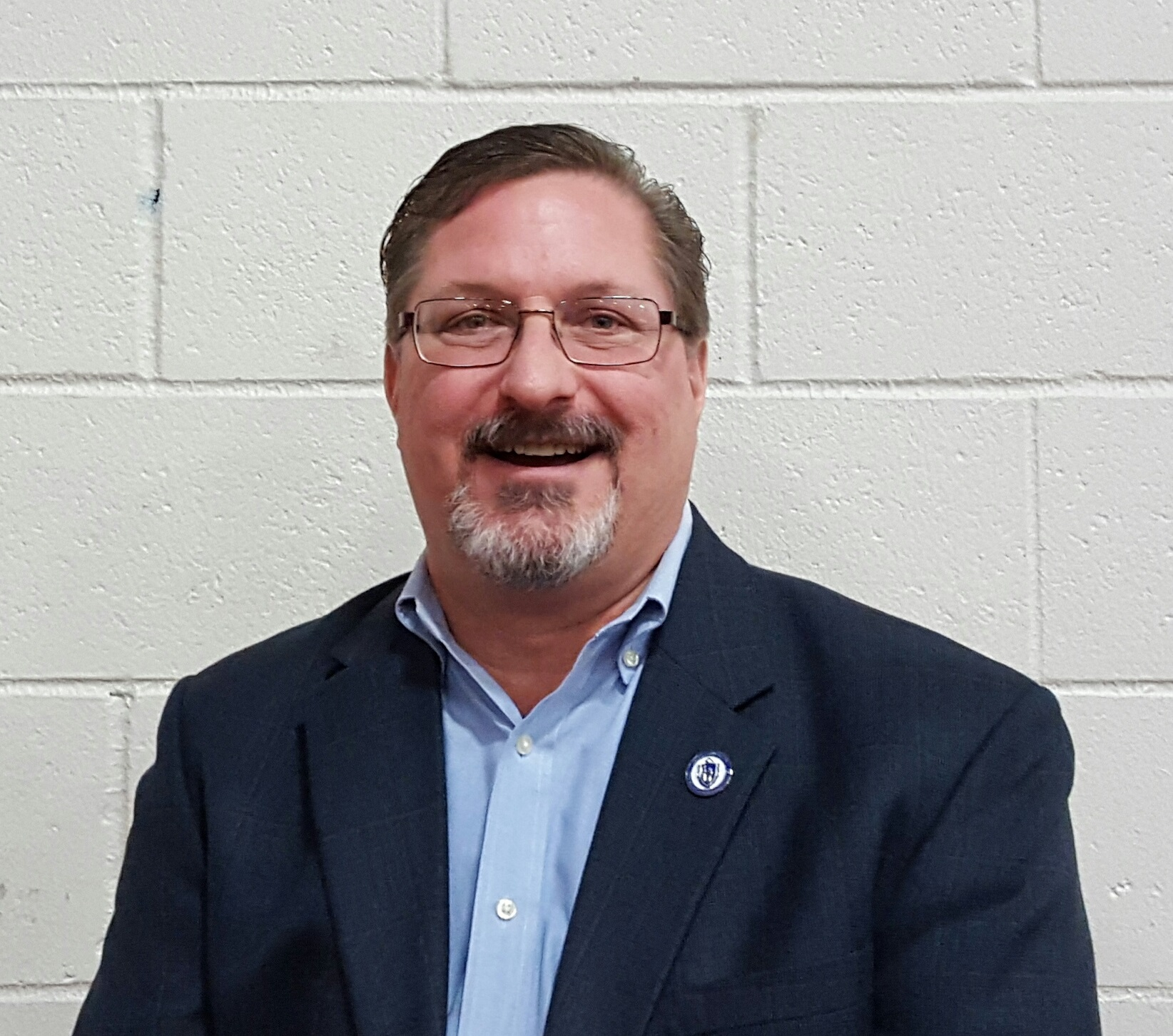

Member of the Massachusetts House of Representatives from the 8th Worcester district
- In office 2011–2018
- Succeeded by: Michael Soter

Personal details
- Party: Republican
- Website: kevinkuros.com

Kevin J. Kuros is an American state legislator who served in the Massachusetts House of Representatives from 2011 to 2018 as a member of the Republican Party. Kuros represented the 8th Worcester District consisting of the towns of Bellingham Blackstone Millville and Uxbridge.

== Committee memberships ==
- Joint Committee on Economic Development and Emerging Technologies
- Joint Committee on Municipalities and Regional Government
- House Committee on Technology and Intergovernmental Affairs

== Personal life ==
Kuros is married to his wife Linda. They have two children and reside in Uxbridge.
