= Bill Bowles =

American politician

Member of the Massachusetts House of Representatives from the 2nd Bristol district
- In office 2009–2011
- Preceded by: John Lepper
- Succeeded by: George T. Ross

Personal details
- Party: Democratic
- Spouse: Ellen Parker
- Occupation: Politician

William Bowles is an American politician who represented the 2nd Bristol District in the Massachusetts House of Representatives from 2009 to 2011. He had previously served as a member of the Attleboro, Massachusetts City Council.
