= George T. Ross =

American politician (1949–2020)

Member of the Massachusetts House of Representatives from the 2nd Bristol district
- In office 2011–2013
- Preceded by: Bill Bowles
- Succeeded by: Paul Heroux

Personal details
- Born: November 3, 1949 Pawtucket, Rhode Island, United States
- Died: May 20, 2020 (aged 70) Attleboro, Massachusetts, U.S.
- Party: Republican
- Spouse: Jeanne Ross
- Children: 1
- Education: Johnson & Wales University
- Occupation: chef

George T. Ross (November 3, 1949 – May 20, 2020) was an American politician from Massachusetts.

Ross was born in Pawtucket, Rhode Island and went to the Pawtucket Public Schools. He served in the United States Army during the Vietnam War. Ross studied culinary arts at Johnson & Wales University in Providence, Rhode Island. He owned and operated a restaurant in Attleboro, Massachusetts. He was a member of the Massachusetts House of Representatives for the 2nd Bristol district and a member of the Attleboro, Massachusetts City Council. Ross was a Republican.
