= John Lepper =

American politician

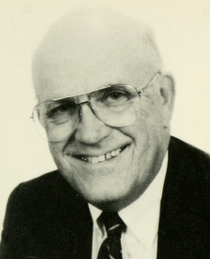
- Portrait of John Lepper

Member of the Massachusetts House of Representatives from the 2nd Bristol district
- In office 1995–2009
- Preceded by: Stephen Karol
- Succeeded by: Bill Bowles

Personal details
- Born: December 22, 1934 (age 91) Attleboro, Massachusetts
- Party: Republican
- Education: Heidelberg College; Johns Hopkins University; Georgetown University
- Occupation: Businessman

John A. Lepper (born December 22, 1934, in Attleboro, Massachusetts) is an American politician who represented the 2nd Bristol District in the Massachusetts House of Representatives from 1995 to 2009. He had previously served as a member of the Attleboro, Massachusetts City Council from 1987 to 1993.
