= Anthony D. Galluccio =

American politician

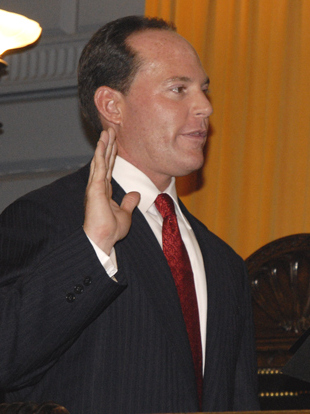
- Galluccio in 2007

Member of the Massachusetts Senate from the Middlesex, Suffolk and Essex district
- In office July 2007 – January 5, 2010
- Preceded by: Jarrett Barrios
- Succeeded by: Sal DiDomenico

Mayor of Cambridge, Massachusetts
- In office 2000–2004
- Preceded by: Francis Duehay
- Succeeded by: Michael A. Sullivan

Vice-Mayor of Cambridge, MA
- In office 1998–1999

Cambridge City Council
- In office 1994–2007

Personal details
- Born: June 16, 1967 (age 59)
- Party: Democratic
- Education: Providence College, Suffolk Law School

Anthony D. Galluccio (born June 16, 1967) is a former American Massachusetts State Senator, and a Democratic politician having won the seat vacated by Jarrett T. Barrios. He is a graduate of Cambridge Rindge and Latin High School, Providence College, and Suffolk Law School.

He was first elected to the Cambridge City Council in 1994, becoming vice-mayor in 1998 and served as mayor of Cambridge from 2000 to 2001. As Mayor, he chaired both the City Council and the School Committee. Galluccio was the youngest Mayor elected under Cambridge's current form of government.

The district Galluccio represented comprises the cities of Everett and Chelsea and parts of Boston, Cambridge, Somerville, Revere, and Saugus. Galluccio was Chair of the Higher Education Committee. He was also appointed Vice Chair of the Senate Bills and Third Reading Committee and appointed as a member to the Education Committee, Housing Committee, Mental Health & Substance Abuse Committee, the Municipalities and Regional Government Committee, and the State Administration and Regulatory Oversight Committee.

In addition to his public service, Galluccio serves as vice president of the board of directors at the Hildebrand Self Help Family Center, a non-profit agency that provides services that empower low-income and homeless families. Galluccio is also the President and founder of Galluccio Associates, Inc, a non-profit organization that directs funds to youth programs and individual young people. He volunteers as an assistant football coach at Cambridge Rindge & Latin School.

Galluccio was raised in Cambridge by his mother, Nancy, who raised three children following his father Tony's death in 1980, when Anthony was 11. He was educated in Cambridge public schools and graduated from Cambridge Rindge and Latin. Galluccio graduated four years later from Providence College. In 1996, he graduated cum laude from Suffolk Law School, which he attended at night while working for Vice Chair of the State Senate Ways and Means Committee, Robert Whetmore. Galluccio is admitted to the Massachusetts Bar and is a practicing attorney.

== Driving-related convictions ==
Galluccio has been convicted three times of driving-related offenses. In 1984 he was convicted of driving under the influence of alcohol, for which he was pardoned by governor William Weld in 1993.

He was convicted of the same offense in 1997.

In October 2009, he was accused of having fled the scene of a car crash. He pleaded guilty to the charge on December 18, 2009, and was sentenced to six months home confinement, with the qualification that he may attend church and cast votes in the State Senate. Within 72 hours of beginning his house arrest the court-ordered breath-alcohol testing device, the BI Sobrietor, detected alcohol on his breath. Galluccio speculated that due to his house arrest his personal hygiene had increased and consequently blamed his toothpaste. He was given the maximum sentence of one year in prison. Galluccio was released from prison on July 15, 2010, and placed on probation.

On January 5, 2010, Galluccio announced his resignation from the General Court, writing, "I want to apologize for my actions in early October, and I accept full responsibility for them."
