= Walter J. Sullivan =

American politician

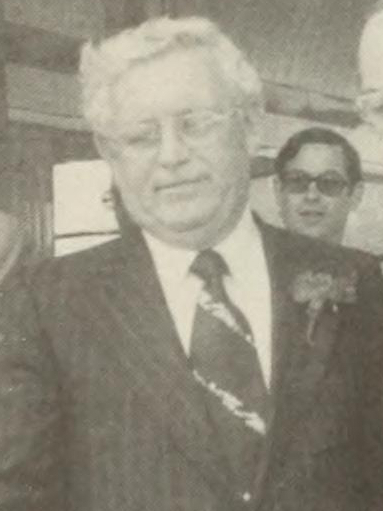
- Sullivan in 1979

Mayor of Cambridge, Massachusetts
- In office 1968–1969
- Preceded by: Daniel Hayes
- Succeeded by: Alfred Vellucci
- In office 1974–1975
- Preceded by: Barbara Ackermann
- Succeeded by: Alfred Vellucci
- In office 1986–1987
- Preceded by: Francis Duehay
- Succeeded by: Alfred Vellucci

Personal details
- Born: Walter Joseph Sullivan; March 2, 1923 Cambridge, Massachusetts, United States
- Died: August 4, 2014 (aged 91) Cambridge, Massachusetts, United States
- Party: Democratic
- Spouse: Marion Colarusso (m. 1946)
- Occupation: Politician

Walter Joseph Sullivan (March 2, 1923–August 4, 2014) was an American politician. Sullivan was the 52nd, 55th, and 62nd Mayor of Cambridge, Massachusetts.

== Career ==
Born in Cambridge, Sullivan attended the Cambridge Rindge and Latin School, and took on work at the M.A. Sullivan Trucking Company. He served in the United States Army Air Forces during World War II.

In 1951, Sullivan served in the Massachusetts House of Representatives as a Democrat. In 1960, he served on the Cambridge City Council. Sullivan served three terms as Mayor of Cambridge from 1968-1969, 1974-1975, and 1986-1987. The City of Cambridge named their water treatment facility after him. Sullivan died in his hometown in 2014.

== See also ==
- 1951–1952 Massachusetts legislature
