= Massachusetts House of Representatives' 4th Middlesex district =

American legislative district

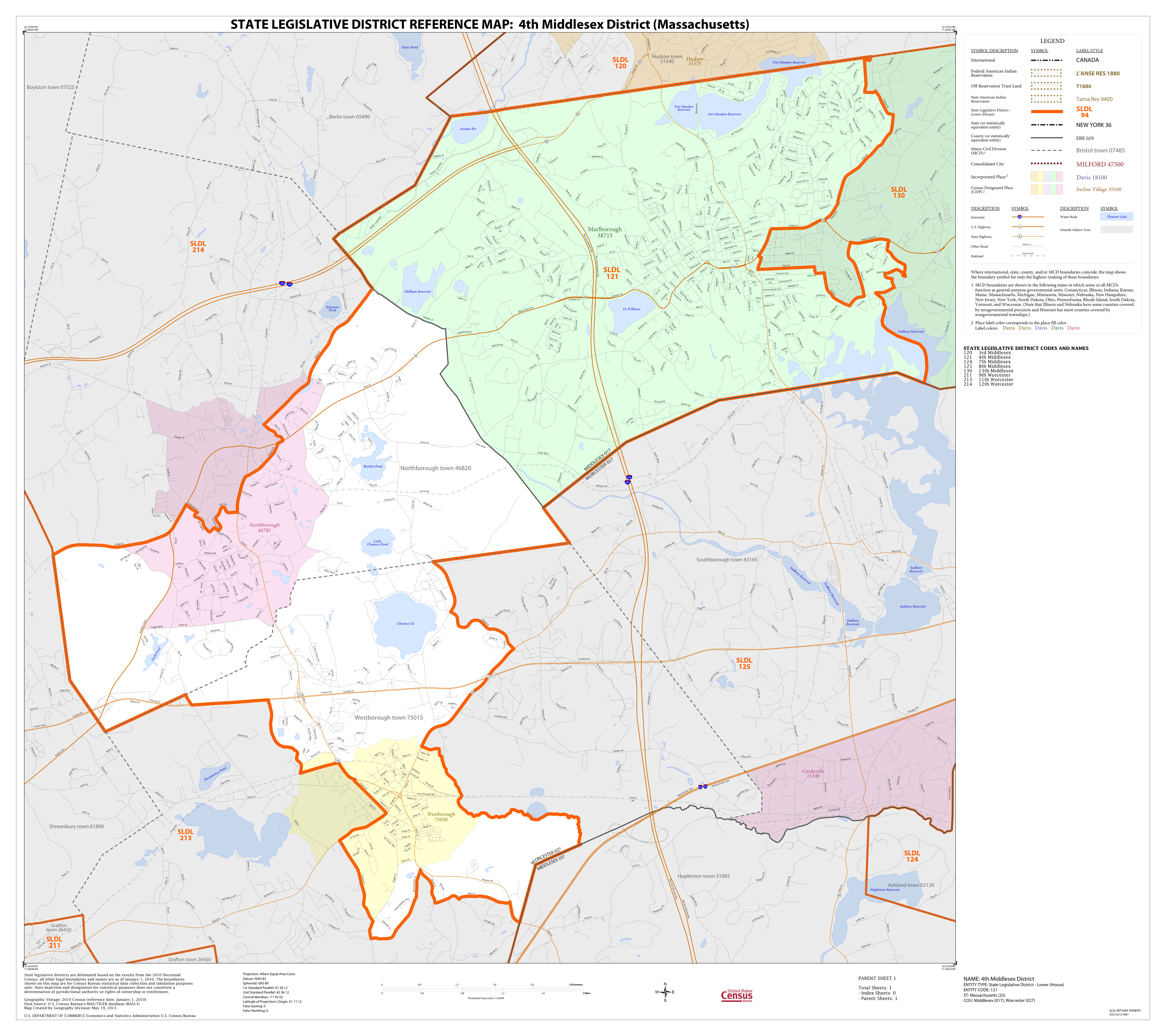
Map of Massachusetts House of Representatives' 4th Middlesex district, based on the 2010 United States census.

Massachusetts House of Representatives' 4th Middlesex district in the United States is one of 160 legislative districts included in the lower house of the Massachusetts General Court. It covers parts of Middlesex County and Worcester County. Democrat Danielle Gregoire of Marlborough has represented the district since 2013.

== Towns represented ==
The district includes the following localities:

- part of Marlborough
- part of Northborough
- part of Westborough

The current district geographic boundary overlaps with those of the Massachusetts Senate's Middlesex and Worcester district and 1st Worcester district.

=== Former locales ===
The district previously covered:

- Malden, circa 1872
- Somerville, circa 1872

== Representatives ==
- Phineas Sprague, circa 1858
- John Q. A. Griffin, circa 1859
- Moses Davis Church, circa 1888
- Isaac S. Pear, circa 1888
- John C Brimblecom, circa 1920
- Bernard Earley, circa 1920
- Abbott B. Rice, circa 1920
- Christian Archibald Herter, Jr., circa 1951
- George E. Rawson, circa 1951
- John Joseph Toomey, circa 1975
- Saundra Graham, 1977-1979
- Joseph M. Navin, 1979-1984
- Robert A. Durand, 1984-1991
- Daniel J. Valianti, 1991-1997
- Stephen P. LeDuc, 1997-2008
- Danielle W. Gregoire, 2009-2011
- Steven Levy, 2011-2013
- Danielle W. Gregoire, 2013-current

== See also ==
- List of Massachusetts House of Representatives elections
- Other Middlesex County districts of the Massachusetts House of Representatives: 1st, 2nd, 3rd, 5th, 6th, 7th, 8th, 9th, 10th, 11th, 12th, 13th, 14th, 15th, 16th, 17th, 18th, 19th, 20th, 21st, 22nd, 23rd, 24th, 25th, 26th, 27th, 28th, 29th, 30th, 31st, 32nd, 33rd, 34th, 35th, 36th, 37th
- List of Massachusetts General Courts
- List of former districts of the Massachusetts House of Representatives

== Images ==
Portraits of legislators

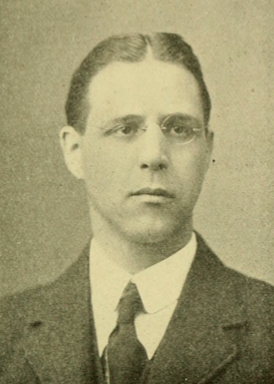
Elias Bishop

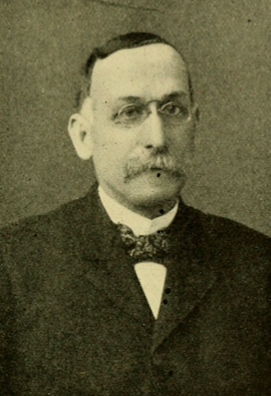
John Lothrop

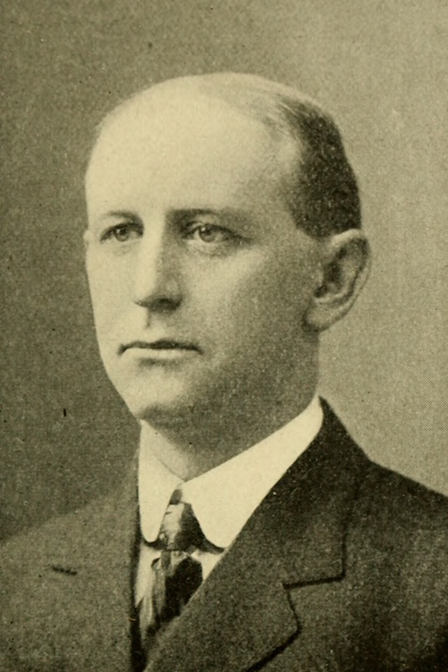
William Garcelon

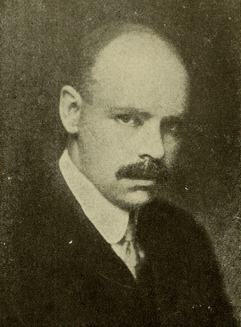
J. Weston Allen

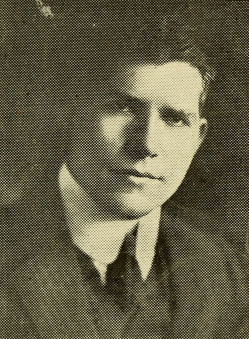
Leland Powers

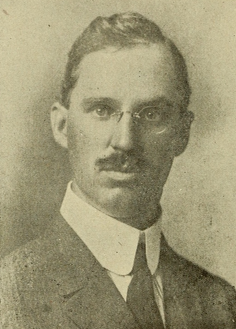
Thomas Weston

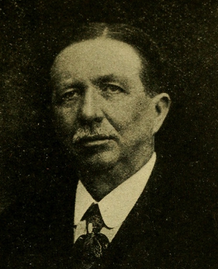
Bernard Early

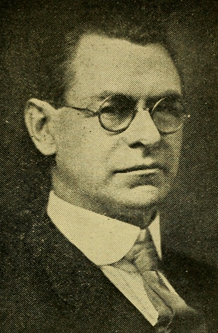
John Brimblecom

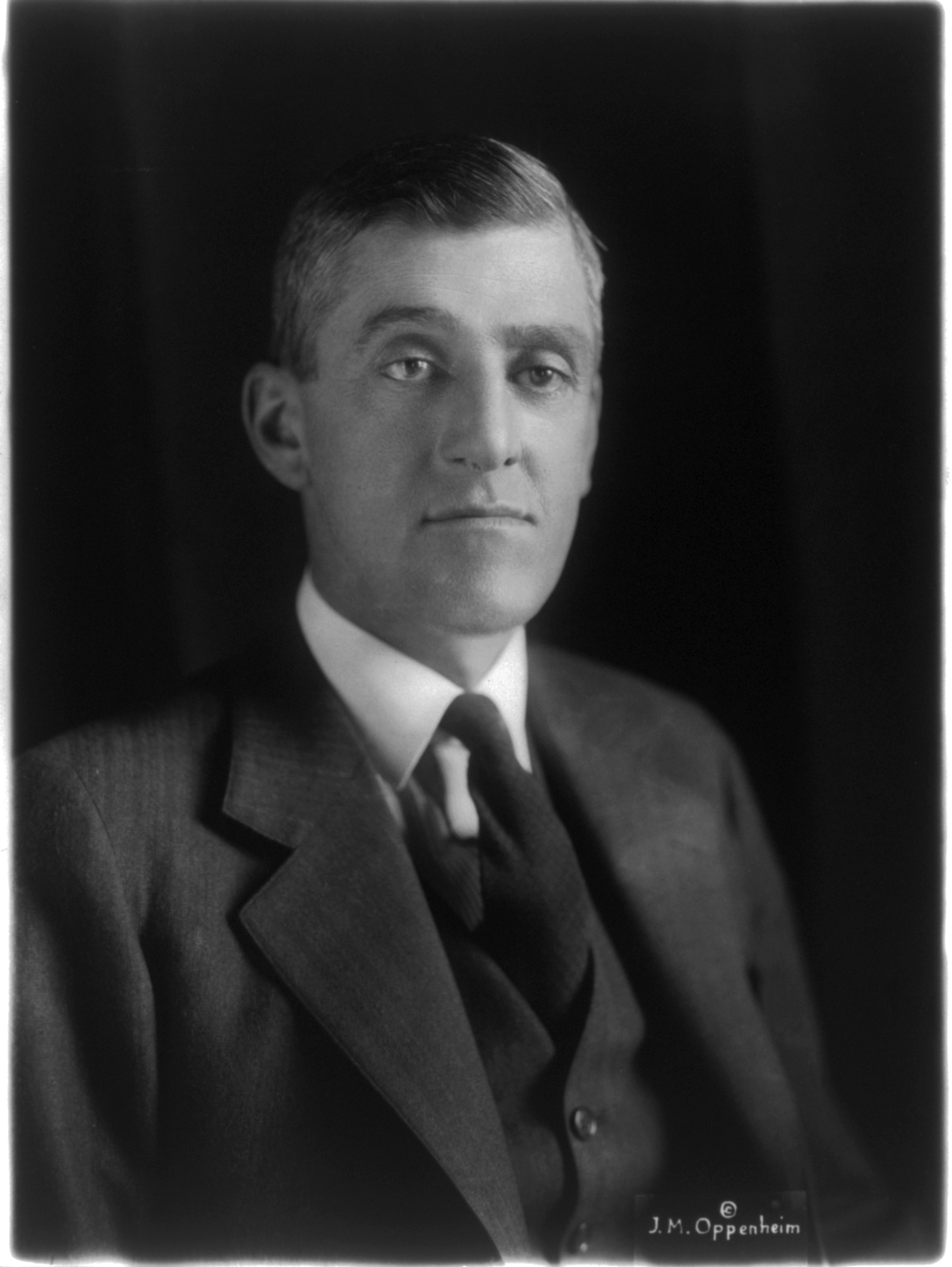
Leverett Saltonstall

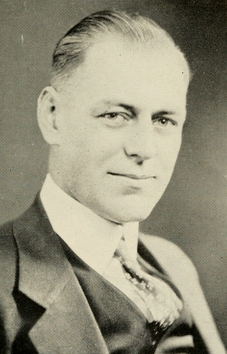
Warren Brimblecom

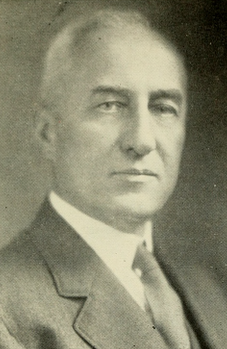
William Baker

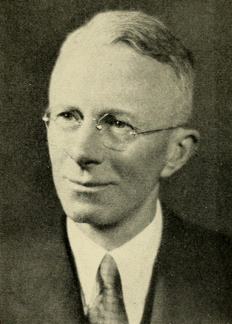
George Rawson

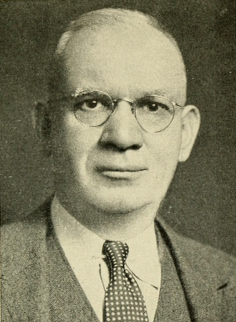
John Whittemore

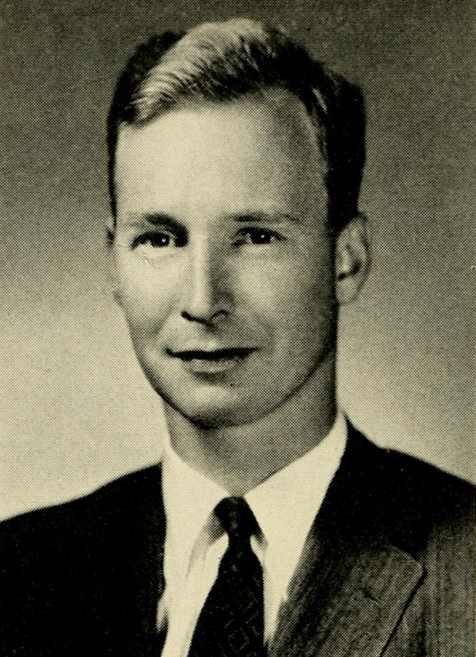
Christian Archibald Herter, Jr.

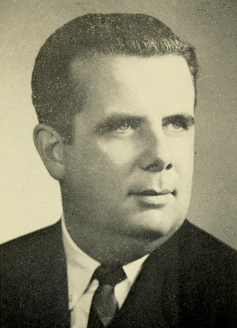
Joseph Bradley

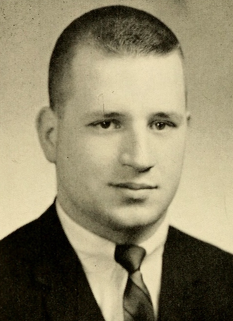
Paul Malloy

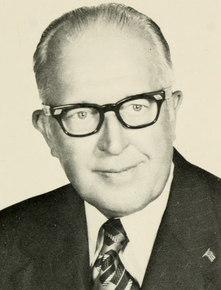
John Toomey

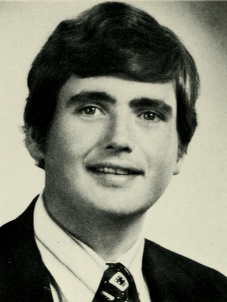
Joseph Navin

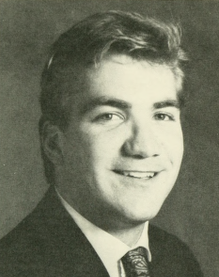
Daniel Valianti

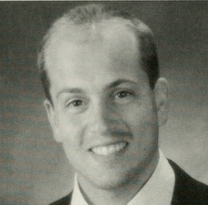
Stephen LeDuc

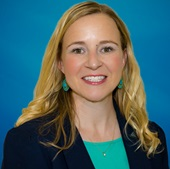
Danielle W. Gregoire
