= Susan Tierney =

American politician (born 1951)

United States Assistant Secretary of Energy for Policy
- In office 1993–1995
- President: Bill Clinton
- Preceded by: ???
- Succeeded by: Dan W. Reicher (Acting)

Massachusetts Secretary of Environmental Affairs
- In office 1991–1993
- Governor: Bill Weld
- Preceded by: John DeVillars
- Succeeded by: Trudy Coxe

Personal details
- Born: 1951 (age 73–74)
- Party: Democratic
- Education: Scripps College (BA); Cornell University (MA, PhD)

Susan F. Tierney (born 1951) is an American academic and government administrator of energy policy. In the United States federal government, she reached the rank of Assistant Secretary for Policy in the United States Department of Energy.

== Early life and education ==
In 1973, Tierney received a Bachelor of Arts degree in Art History from Scripps College. She received a Master's of Regional Planning from Cornell University in 1976 and a Ph.D. in Regional Planning from Cornell in 1980.

== Career ==
=== Academia ===
Tierney worked as an assistant professor at the University of California, Irvine from 1978 to 1982 and as a researcher for the National Academy of Sciences in 1982. Tierney is an expert in the regulation and economics of the electricity and natural gas industries.

=== Government ===
From 1982 to 1993, Tierney held a variety of positions in the government of Massachusetts, including as Executive Director of the Energy Facilities Siting Council, Commissioner of the Department of Public Utilities, and Secretary of Environmental Affairs.

In 1993, President Bill Clinton nominated Tierney to be Assistant Secretary of Energy for Policy.

She co-led the Department of Energy Agency Transition Team as part of the Obama/Biden Presidential Transition Project, and then assisted Energy Secretary Steven Chu during his first six weeks in his position.

During this period, she was on leave from her position as a managing principal and energy and economics consultant with the Analysis Group since 2003. From 1993 to 1995 she served as the Assistant Secretary of Energy for Policy in the Clinton administration. Previously, she was appointed to roles in state government in Massachusetts by both Republican governor William Weld and Democratic governor Michael Dukakis. Early in her career she was an assistant professor at the University of California, Irvine.

Tierney was expected to be named Deputy Secretary of Energy under President Barack Obama, until she withdrew her candidacy for the position in March 2009.

In September 2009, Dr. Tierney was elected to the Board of Directors of World Resources Institute.

== Personal life ==
She is the sister of James Fallows, the noted journalist and author.
