= Steven Levy (disambiguation) =

Steven Levy (born 1951) is an American journalist.

Steven Levy may also refer to:

- Steve Levy (born 1965), county executive of Suffolk County, New York
- Stephen Young (actor) (born 1939), Canadian actor who was born Stephen Levy in Toronto
- Steven Levy (politician), American state legislator in Massachusetts
