= Kate Hogan =

American politician

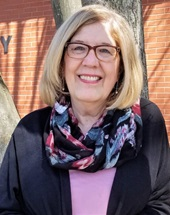

Speaker pro tempore of the Massachusetts House of Representatives
- Incumbent
- Assumed office February 11, 2021
- Leader: Ronald Mariano
- Preceded by: Patricia Haddad

Member of the Massachusetts House of Representatives from the 3rd Middlesex district
- Incumbent
- Assumed office January 7, 2009
- Preceded by: Patricia Walrath

Personal details
- Born: January 15, 1957 (age 69) Lynn, Massachusetts, U.S.
- Party: Democratic
- Spouse: Susan Vick
- Education: University of Massachusetts, Amherst (BA)
- Website: Official website

Kate Hogan (born January 15, 1957, in Lynn, Massachusetts) is an American politician from Stow, Massachusetts. A Democrat, she is a member of the Massachusetts House of Representatives representing the 3rd Middlesex district. She was first elected in 2008 and took office on January 7, 2009.

== Career ==
The 3rd Middlesex district, which includes the towns of Bolton, Hudson, Maynard and Stow, was represented for 24 years by Patricia Walrath, who decided not to seek re-election in 2008. Five candidates ran for to succeed her: three Democrats, one Republican and one Independent. Prior to the primary, Walrath endorsed Hogan as her chosen successor.

In the three-way primary election held on September 16, 2008, Hogan won 50 percent of the vote to the second-placed finisher's 40 percent. She went on to face two opponents in the general election on November 4, narrowly besting the Republican nominee, Hudson selectman Sonny Parente, by 10,156 votes to 9,281. She ran for re-election in 2010, facing no Republican opponent and taking 60% of the vote against an independent.

Her first action on being sworn in on January 7, 2009, was to turn down a pay raise. She donated the $3,000 increase in legislative salaries to the local libraries in Bolton, Hudson, Maynard and Stow.

On February 26, 2015, Speaker Robert DeLeo appointed Hogan as Chair of the Joint Committee on Public Health.

Hogan, a native of Lynn, Massachusetts, is a graduate of the University of Massachusetts Amherst and works as vice president of Gnomon Inc., a Boston printing company. She has long been involved in local Democratic politics, having served as an officer of the Stow Democratic Town Committee, the Middlesex and Worcester Democrats and as co-chairman of the Maynard Democratic Town Committee from 1999 to 2006. She has also sat on several of Stow's town committees, including the Community Preservation Committee and the Council on Aging.

Hogan, a lesbian, is married to Susan Vick. Her 2008 and 2010 campaigns won the support of the Gay & Lesbian Victory Fund.

== See also ==
- 2019–2020 Massachusetts legislature
- 2021–2022 Massachusetts legislature

Massachusetts House of Representatives
Preceded by Patricia Haddad	Speaker pro tempore of the Massachusetts House of Representatives; 2021–present	Incumbent
