= Massachusetts House of Representatives' 3rd Middlesex district =

American legislative district

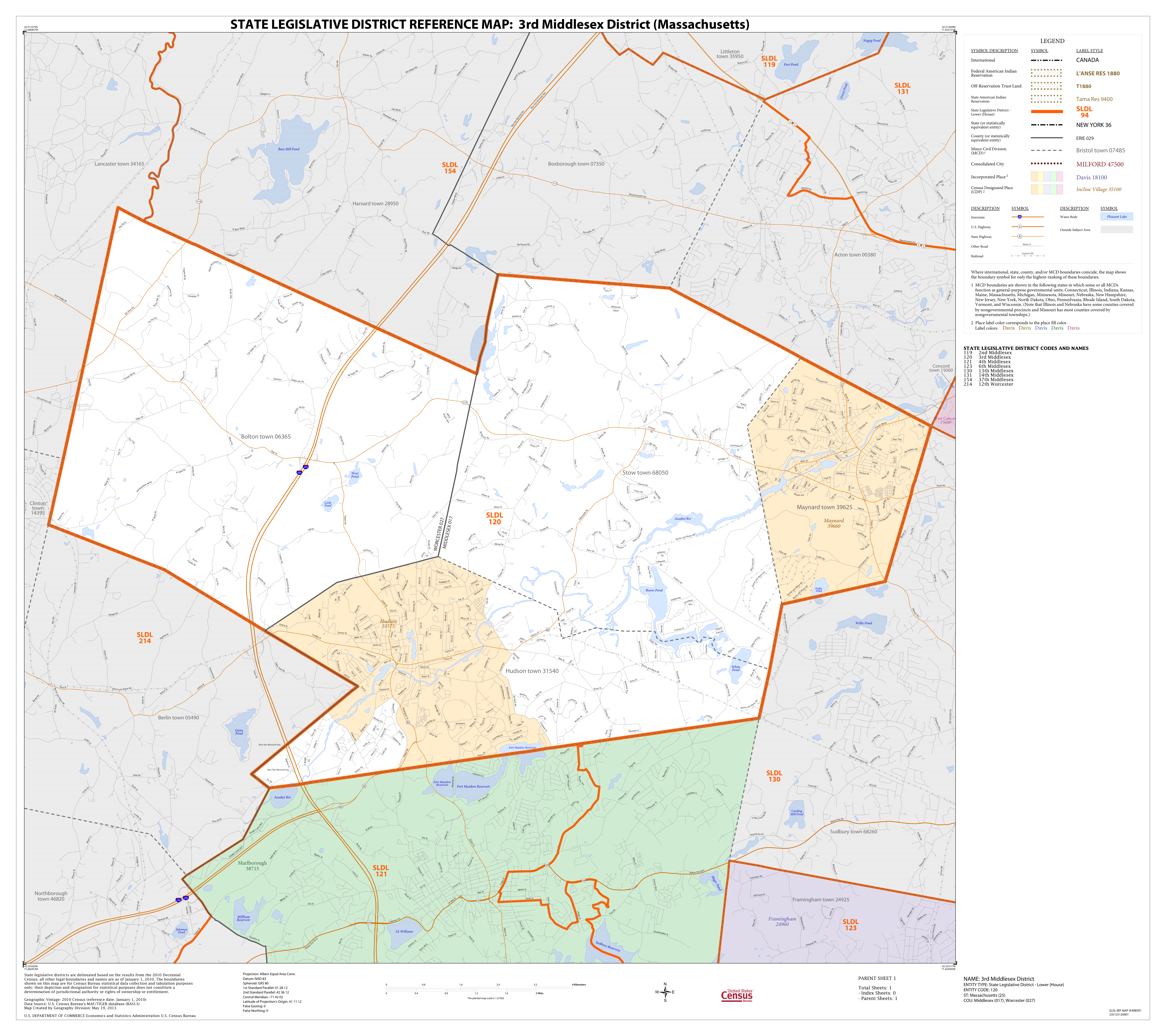
Map of Massachusetts House of Representatives' 3rd Middlesex district, based on the 2010 United States census.

Massachusetts House of Representatives' 3rd Middlesex district (or "3rd Middlesex") is an electoral district for the Massachusetts House of Representatives. Located in central Massachusetts, it comprises the towns of Hudson, Maynard and Stow (all of which are located in Middlesex County), as well as the town of Bolton (located in Worcester County). Democrat Kate Hogan of Stow has represented the district since 2013. She is running unopposed for re-election in the 2020 Massachusetts general election.

The current district geographic boundary overlaps with those of the Massachusetts Senate's Middlesex and Worcester district and Worcester and Middlesex district.

== District history ==
The 3rd district has existed in its current iteration since the 2004 redistricting.

=== Former locale ===
The district previously covered part of Charlestown, circa 1872.

== Representatives ==
- Isaac F. Shepard, circa 1859
- Russell A. Wood circa 1910
- Arthur Enoch Beane, circa 1920
- Louis L. Green, circa 1920
- Arthur K. Reading, circa 1920
- Paul Andrew Dever, 1928-1935
- Tip O'Neill, circa 1945
- Charles F. Flaherty Jr., 1967–1979
- Paul Cellucci, 1979–1985
- Patricia Walrath, 1985–2009
- Kate Hogan, 2009–present

== Electoral history ==
From 1985 to 2009, the 3rd District was represented by Democrat Patricia Walrath, who decided not to seek re-election in 2008. Since 2009, the District has been represented by Democrat Kate Hogan.

=== 2014 ===
Candidate	Party	Votes	%
Kate Hogan	Democratic Party	9,847	60.22
Paddy Dolan	Republican Party	6,495	39.72
Write-ins		9	0.06
Invalid/blank votes		641	–
Total		16,992	100
Source: Secretary of the Commonwealth of Massachusetts

=== 2012 ===
Candidate	Party	Votes	%
Kate Hogan	Democratic Party	14,074	64.11
Chuck S. Kuniewich, Jr	Republican Party	7,865	35.82
Write-ins		15	0.07
Invalid/blank votes		1,317	–
Total		23,271	100
Source: Secretary of the Commonwealth of Massachusetts

=== 2010 ===
Candidate	Party	Votes	%
Kate Hogan	Democratic Party	10,114	60.05
Chuck S. Kuniewich	Republican Party	6,719	39.89
Write-ins		11	0.07
Invalid/blank votes		1,106	–
Total		17,950	100
Source: Secretary of the Commonwealth of Massachusetts

== Voter affiliation ==
	Total registered	Democratic	Democratic (%)	Green-Rainbow	Green-Rainbow (%)	Republican	Republican (%)	United Independent	United Independent (%)	Unenrolled	Unenrolled (%)
Bolton	3392	658	19.40	2	0.06	634	18.69	0	0.00	2093	61.70
Stow	4809	1152	23.96	5	0.10	677	14.08	0	0.00	2964	61.63
Maynard	7004	2230	31.84	13	0.19	744	10.62	0	0.00	2983	42.59
Hudson	12102	2885	23.84	17	0.14	1384	11.44	6	0.05	7758	64.11
District total	27307	6925	25.36	37	0.14	3439	12.59	6	0.02	15798	57.85
2015 Figures; Source: Secretary of the Commonwealth of Massachusetts

== See also ==
- Other Middlesex County districts of the Massachusetts House of Representatives: 1st, 2nd, 4th, 5th, 6th, 7th, 8th, 9th, 10th, 11th, 12th, 13th, 14th, 15th, 16th, 17th, 18th, 19th, 20th, 21st, 22nd, 23rd, 24th, 25th, 26th, 27th, 28th, 29th, 30th, 31st, 32nd, 33rd, 34th, 35th, 36th, 37th
- List of former districts of the Massachusetts House of Representatives

== Images ==
Portraits of legislators

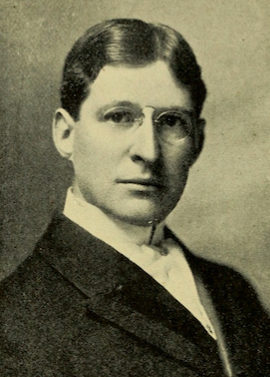
George Long

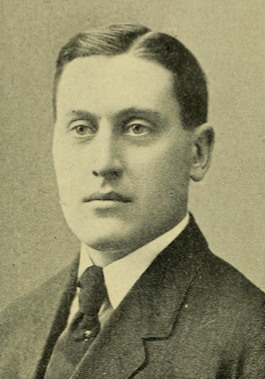
Harry Stearns

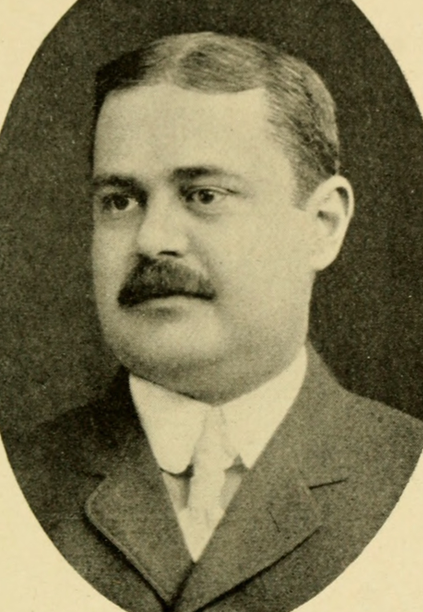
Samuel Elmore

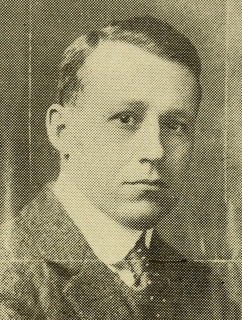
Arthur Blanchard

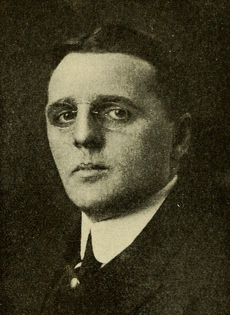
George Carrick

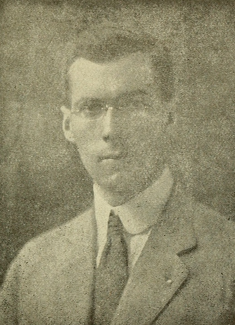
Philip Ammidon

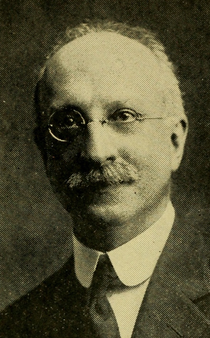
Albert Harrison Hall

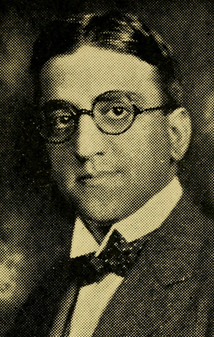
Louis Green

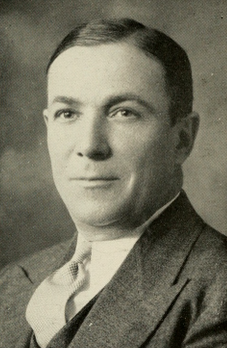
James Mahoney

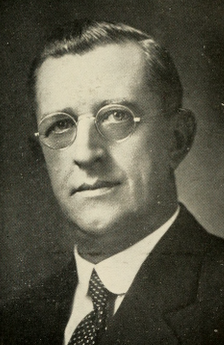
John Foley

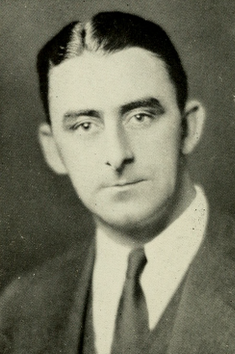
Joseph Cleary

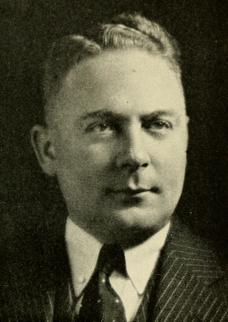
Jeremiah Sullivan

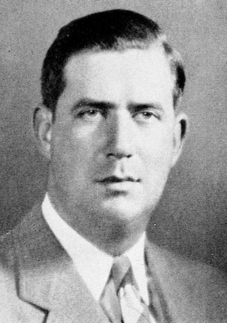
Thomas O'Neill

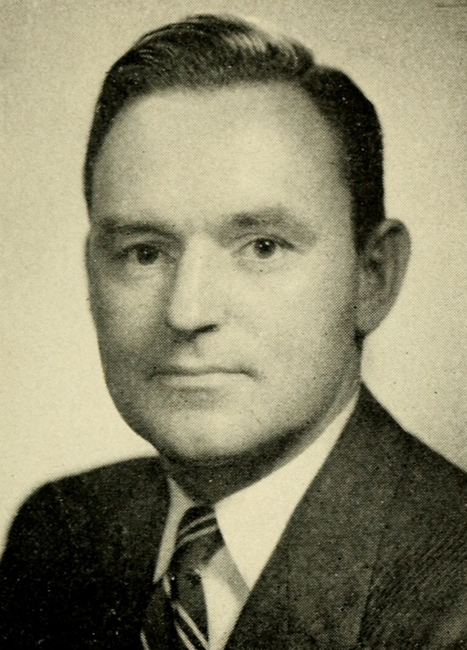
John Francis Cremens

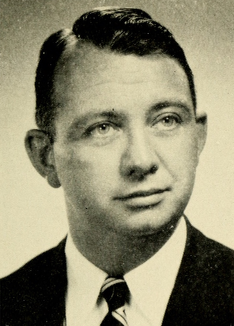
Lawrence Feloney

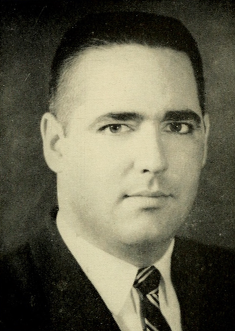
Charles Flaherty

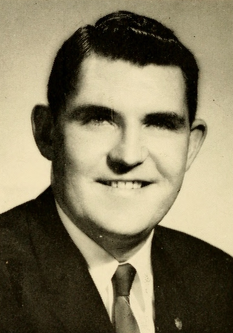
Timothy Hickey

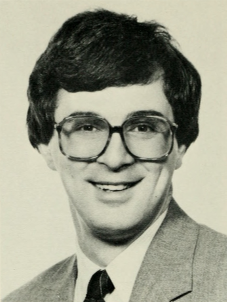
Argeo Cellucci

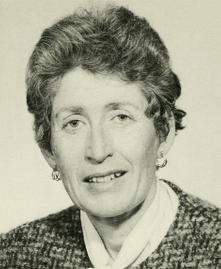
Patricia Walrath
