= Paul Cellucci =

American lawyer and politician (1948–2013)

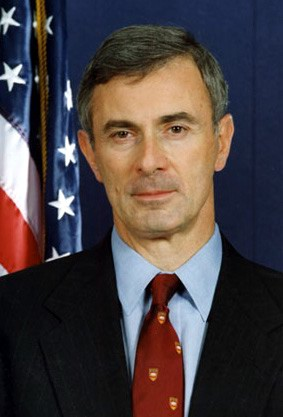

27th United States Ambassador to Canada
- In office April 17, 2001 – March 18, 2005
- President: George W. Bush
- Preceded by: Gordon Giffin
- Succeeded by: David Wilkins

69th Governor of Massachusetts
- In office July 29, 1997 – April 10, 2001
- Lieutenant: Jane Swift
- Preceded by: Bill Weld
- Succeeded by: Jane Swift (acting)

68th Lieutenant Governor of Massachusetts
- In office January 3, 1991 – January 7, 1999
- Governor: Bill Weld
- Preceded by: Evelyn Murphy
- Succeeded by: Jane Swift

Minority Whip of the Massachusetts Senate
- In office January 4, 1989 – January 1, 1991
- Preceded by: Lucile Hicks
- Succeeded by: Mary L. Padula

Member of the Massachusetts Senate from the Middlesex and Worcester district
- In office January 2, 1985 – January 2, 1991
- Preceded by: Chester Atkins
- Succeeded by: Robert Durand

Member of the Massachusetts House of Representatives
- In office January 5, 1977 – January 2, 1985
- Preceded by: Wilfred Balthazar
- Succeeded by: Patricia Walrath
- Constituency: 51st Middlesex district (1977–1979); 3rd Middlesex district (1979–1985)

Personal details
- Born: Argeo Paul Cellucci; April 24, 1948 Hudson, Massachusetts, U.S.
- Died: June 8, 2013 (aged 65) Hudson, Massachusetts, U.S.
- Resting place: Forestvale Cemetery
- Party: Republican
- Spouse: Jan Garnett (m. 1972)
- Children: 2
- Education: Boston College (BA, JD)
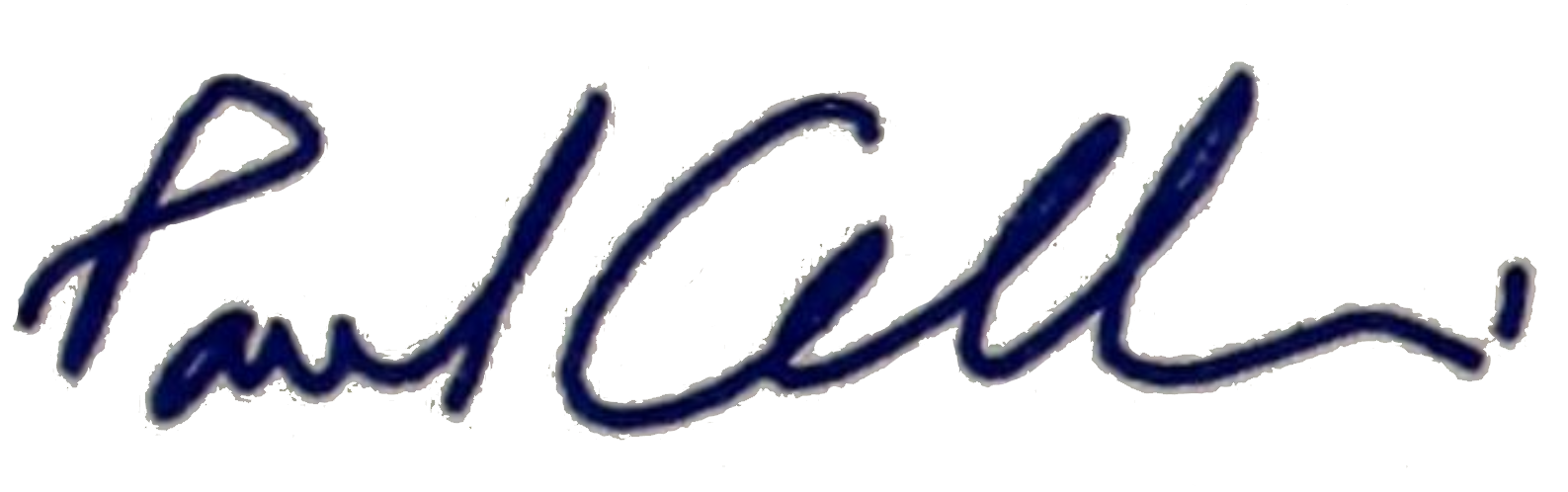
- Signature

Military service
- Allegiance: United States
- Branch/service: United States Army
- Years of service: 1970–1978
- Rank: Captain
- Unit: Reserves

Argeo Paul Cellucci (/sɛˈluːtʃiː/; April 24, 1948 – June 8, 2013) was an American politician, lawyer, and diplomat. A member of the Republican Party, he served as the 69th governor of Massachusetts from 1999 to 2001 (acting governor, 1997 to 1999) and as the United States Ambassador to Canada from 2001 to 2005. He also served as 68th lieutenant governor of Massachusetts from 1991 to 1999, as well as in the Massachusetts House of Representatives and Senate from 1977 to 1991.

Cellucci became acting governor following Bill Weld's resignation in 1997 after being nominated for United States Ambassador to Mexico. He then was elected to a full term as governor in 1998, and served until 2001, when he resigned to become the U.S. Ambassador to Canada under President George W. Bush, a post he held until 2005.

== Early life and career ==
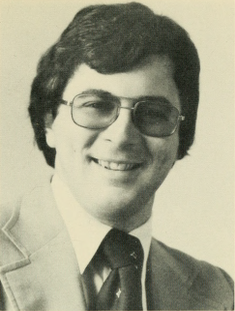
Cellucci as a State Representative in 1979

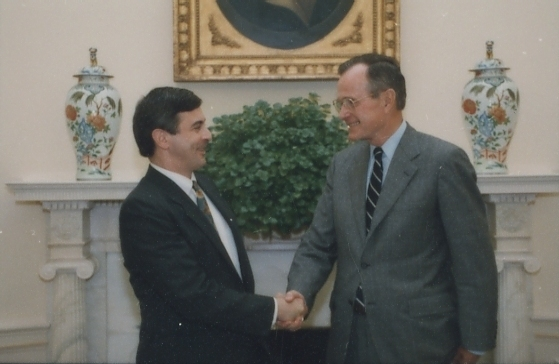
Cellucci with President George H. W. Bush in 1992

Cellucci was born in Hudson, Massachusetts, into a political family, the son of Priscilla M. (née Rose) and Argeo R. Cellucci Jr. His father was of Italian descent from the small Lazio village of San Donato Val di Comino, and his mother was of Irish ancestry.

He graduated from Hudson Catholic High School, Boston College (BA, 1970), and Boston College Law School (JD, 1973). He and his wife Jan were married in 1972. They had two daughters, Kate and Anne (who is married to Brunei-born Canadian hockey player Craig Adams). He served in the United States Army Reserve from 1970 to 1978, reaching the rank of Captain.

He was a Republican, and held the distinction of never losing an election over his three decades in elected office in overwhelmingly Democratic Massachusetts. Cellucci was first elected to public office as a member of the Hudson Charter Commission in 1970. Subsequently, he was elected to the Hudson Board of Selectmen, on which he served from 1971 to 1977. In 1976, he was elected to the Massachusetts House of Representatives where he served until 1985. He then became a member of the Massachusetts Senate, serving from 1985 to 1991. From 1991 to 1999 he was Lieutenant Governor of Massachusetts.

== Governor of Massachusetts ==
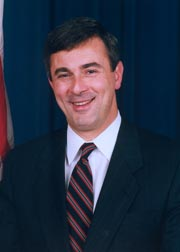
Cellucci as Governor

Cellucci became the Governor of Massachusetts in 1997 upon the resignation of Bill Weld. On November 3, 1998, Paul Cellucci was elected as governor, narrowly defeating Democratic attorney general Scott Harshbarger. He had successfully fought off a challenge from State Treasurer Joe Malone in the September primary. He was sworn in as the 69th Governor of Massachusetts on January 7, 1999.

Cellucci was a fiscally conservative, anti-tax governor who had the ability to work in a bipartisan fashion with an overwhelmingly Democratic State Legislature. In 2001, the libertarian Cato Institute, in its fifth biennial fiscal policy report card, gave Cellucci an "A" grade and said he "earned the distinction of having the best record of reducing taxes and restraining spending growth" among the nation's 50 governors. Governor Cellucci spearheaded the statewide initiative to reduce the state income tax from 5.95% to 5%, which was approved 59% to 41% by the voters of Massachusetts in November 2000.

Cellucci was also successful in maintaining the state's high education standards for most students. Those standards, which required students to pass exams in basic Math and English to receive a high school diploma, were a major piece of the Education Reform Act of 1993 and were phased in over time. The teachers unions wanted to weaken the standards just as they were about to take effect, but Cellucci worked with Speaker of the House Thomas Finneran and Senate President Thomas Birmingham, both Democrats, to hold the line on this issue.

The standards have remained in effect and in its June 4, 2007 report card on "No Child Left Behind," Time magazine found that Massachusetts students score the best on the federal tests. However, in 2000, Cellucci signed a budget bill that lowered the state's longstanding "maximum feasible development" standard for special education to the federal mandate of a "free and appropriate public education," which set a much lower standard for the provision of special education to students with disabilities. The latter standard remains in effect.

The biggest controversy during Cellucci's tenure was the huge cost overruns on the "Big Dig" – an enormous project to replace the elevated central artery highway in Boston with a tunnel. Cellucci removed the project manager, James Kerasiotes, and put his Secretary of Administration and Finance, Andrew Natsios, in charge of the project.

Cellucci, in 1998, signed into law one of the toughest gun control measures in the United States. He was also known to take a conservative approach to crime. He supported Roe v. Wade and abortion rights. For this reason, Cardinal Bernard Law disinvited Cellucci from speaking at a commencement ceremony of Hudson Catholic High School, Cellucci's alma mater.

In 2000, Cellucci proposed an amendment to the Massachusetts constitution to strip felons of the right to vote. The amendment was approved in a referendum.

Cellucci appointed many women to high ranking positions, including Margaret H. Marshall as the first female Chief Justice of the Massachusetts Supreme Judicial Court. Her appointment marked the first time a woman headed a branch of government in Massachusetts history.

== Post-gubernatorial career ==
On April 10, 2001, Cellucci resigned, after George W. Bush nominated, and the U.S. Senate confirmed his appointment as U.S. Ambassador to Canada. He was succeeded by Jane Swift, who became the first woman in Massachusetts history to occupy the governor's office.

=== Cabinet and administration ===
The Cellucci Cabinet
OFFICE	NAME	TERM
Acting governor	Paul Cellucci	1997–1999
Governor	Paul Cellucci	1999–2001
Lt. governor	Paul Cellucci; Jane M. Swift	1997–1998; 1998–1999; 1999–2001
Secretary of Transportation	James Kerasiotes; Patrick J. Moynihan; Kevin J. Sullivan	1997–1998; 1998–1999; 1999–2001
Director of Housing & Community Development	Jane Wallis Gumble	1997–2001
Secretary of Environmental Affairs	Trudy Coxe; Robert Durand	1997–1998; 1999–2001
Director of Consumer Affairs	Jane M. Swift; Daniel Grabauskas; Jennifer Davis Carey	1997–1998; 1998–1999; 1999–2001
Secretary of Health and Human Services	William D. O'Leary	1997–2001
Secretary of Elder Affairs	Franklin P. Ollivierre; Lillian Glickman	1997–1998; 1998–2001
Director of Labor & Workforce Development	Angelo R. Buonopane	1997–2001
Secretary of Administration & Finance	Charlie Baker; Frederick A. Laskey; Andrew Natsios; Stephen Crosby	1997–1998; 1998–1999; 1999–2000; 2000–2001
Secretary of Public Safety	Kathleen O'Toole; Jane Perlov	1997–1998; 1998–2001

== U.S. Ambassador to Canada ==
On April 17, 2001, at the Citadel in Quebec City, Cellucci presented his credentials as the 27th United States Ambassador to Canada to Governor General Adrienne Clarkson.

His four-year tenure would be a historical and controversial period in the United States – Canadian relations. On September 14, 2001, three days after the terrorist attacks on United States soil, Ambassador Cellucci thanked Canada for its overwhelming support and sympathy, including their role in Operation Yellow Ribbon, at a memorial in front of 100,000 people on Parliament Hill in Ottawa. He would mention the operation and the memorial service quite often during the days and months that followed the September 11 attacks in the United States. The months and years that followed the attacks would see extraordinary cooperation between the United States and Canada on the Smart Border Agreement, on their law enforcement and intelligence agencies to stop terrorist attacks in North America, and in Afghanistan in the war against the Taliban.

On March 25, 2003, at a speech to the Economic Club of Toronto, Cellucci faced controversy when he criticized Canadian opposition to the U.S.-led invasion of Iraq. He argued that America was waging war for its own security, and that the United States would "never hesitate" to support Canada if it faced a security threat. This wording was considered especially unfortunate by some since the United States did in fact delay years before joining the British Empire in both World Wars I and II in Europe. The Globe and Mail reported Cellucci's remarks under the front-page headline "U.S. rebukes Canada" and Canadian nationalist Mel Hurtig called him "ill-mannered, obnoxious, [and] arrogant".

He also expressed support for Canada joining the U.S. missile defense program, and for urging Canada to increase defense spending. These statements, frequently perceived as implied trade threats, caused Cellucci to be sarcastically christened "the U.S. ambassador-turned-proconsul" by former Liberal cabinet minister and Foreign Minister Lloyd Axworthy in an opinion piece titled "Say no to missile defence" published on April 29, 2003 in The Globe and Mail. Canada has since declined to participate in the U.S. missile defense program.

While the frosty relations were due to the Canadian government's opposition to President Bush's policies, there has also been criticism of the former Prime Minister of Canada Jean Chrétien for tolerating anti-American outbursts from his aide, while Chrétien's successor Paul Martin attempted to paint his opponent, Conservative leader Stephen Harper, as pro-American during the 2004 Canadian federal election.

Cellucci officially resigned his ambassadorship on March 17, 2005. A humorous indication of Canadian opinion of Cellucci's tenure was provided by CBC Television satirist Rick Mercer, who promoted on his program, Rick Mercer Report, a fictitious "Paul Cellucci Farewell Special" entitled "Don't Let the Door Hit You on the Ass".

== Later career ==
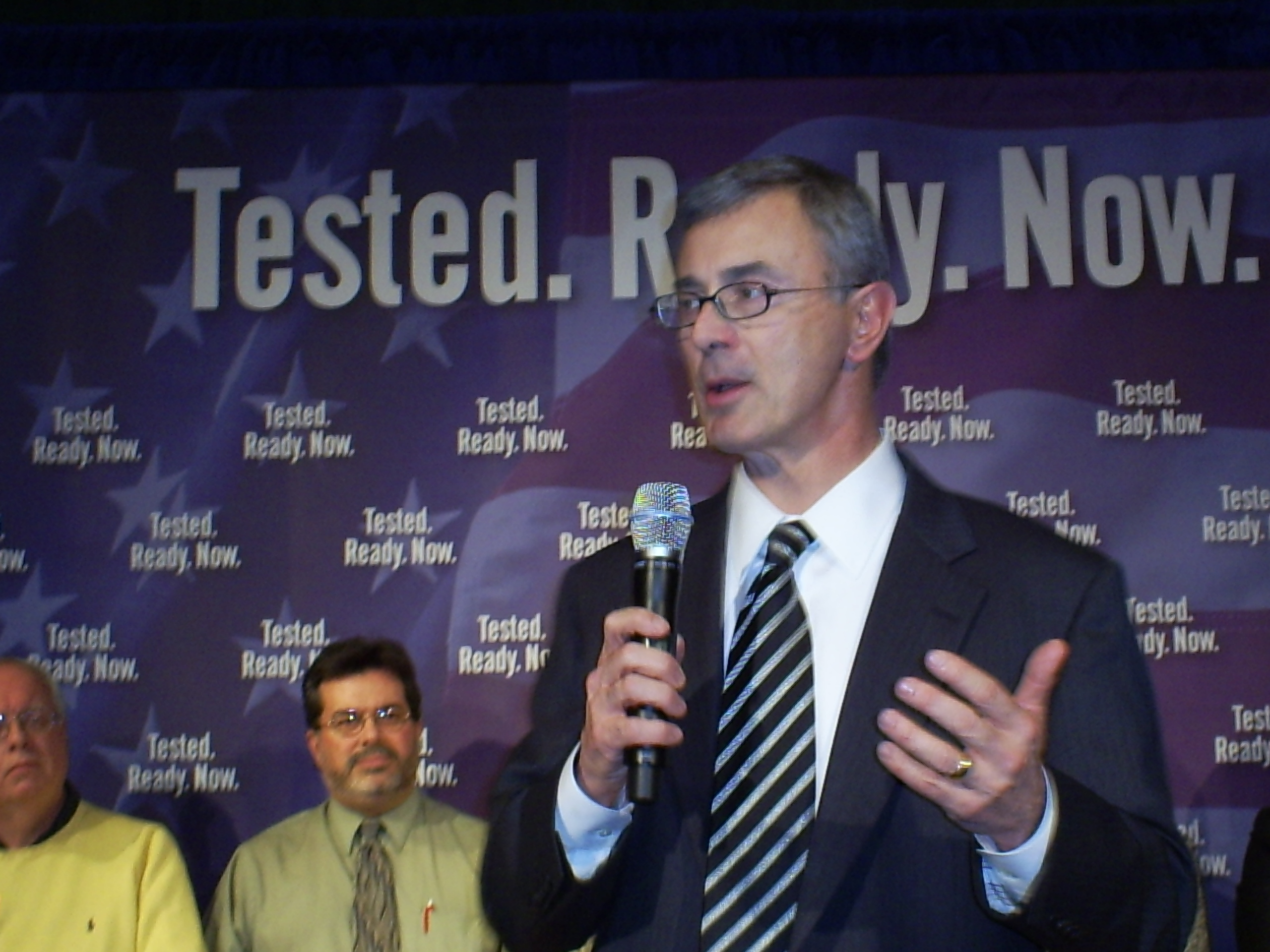
Cellucci at a 2008 campaign event for Presidential candidate Rudy Giuliani

On March 18, 2005, the day after Cellucci had resigned from his ambassadorship, Magna International Corporation announced they had hired Cellucci. Magna chairman Frank Stronach said Cellucci's role would be to help reform U.S. horse racing regulations. In September 2005, Cellucci published a book called Unquiet Diplomacy, a memoir of his time as ambassador. In the book, he praised Canada as "a truly great nation", but also had some criticism for the governments of former Prime Ministers Jean Chrétien and Paul Martin.

The same month, shortly after an interview where U.S. Ambassador to Canada David Wilkins stirred controversy over comments he made on the case of Maher Arar, Cellucci gave an interview in which explained his position on the Arar case. While he was Ambassador, Cellucci had declined to participate into the inquiry into the Americans' "extraordinary rendition" of Arar to Syria and the possible role of Canadian officials in the rendition, being consistent with the Bush administration's position that nothing improper had been done. Cellucci's comments in the 2005 interview were seen as a rebuke to Wilkins.

Cellucci acknowledged, "Part of the unfairness was that we took a Canadian citizen, shipped him to a third country without consulting with Canada," apparently exonerating Canadian officials. Cellucci did point out that as a result of the Canadian Government's protest about Arar, the United States and Canada exchanged letters, in which each undertook to notify the other country if either government was going to remove, involuntarily, a National of the other country to a third country. While each country retains all rights to do what is in its security interests, Cellucci believed that as a practical matter, this makes it highly unlikely that anything like the Arar situation will happen again.

The same interview revealed that Cellucci, as a private citizen, also had second thoughts about the stance he had taken as ambassador on the 2003 invasion of Iraq. During the lead-up to the invasion, Cellucci had put pressure on Canada to join in the invasion, based on the American and UK assertions that Saddam's administration possessed a dangerous arsenal of weapons of mass destruction. But in 2005 Cellucci acknowledged: "We're not always right, and on that particular one it looks like we weren't right, although we know at some point in the past he did have these weapons."

Cellucci left Magna International in the fall of 2006 and joined the Boston office of the law firm of McCarter & English, LLP, where he held the title of Special Counsel. In 2008, Cellucci said that, after thirty-five years in public service, he had no intention of seeking further office, and that, while he had no interest in serving as vice president, he did not exclusively rule it out. He supported John McCain's candidacy for president in 2008.

In 2013, Cellucci was a signatory to an amicus curiae brief submitted to the United States Supreme Court in support of same-sex marriage during the Hollingsworth v. Perry case.

Also in 2013, Cellucci helped free a U.S. citizen (the younger brother of sports broadcaster Tripp Tracy) who was imprisoned by the Venezuelan government.

== Illness and death ==
In January 2011, Cellucci announced he had been diagnosed with amyotrophic lateral sclerosis (ALS), also known as Lou Gehrig's disease, and that it was progressing relatively slowly.

Cellucci responded to his diagnosis by leading an effort to raise $10 million for research at the University of Massachusetts Medical School (UMMS) into amyotrophic lateral sclerosis. Cellucci joined UMMS Chancellor Michael F. Collins and UMMS neurologist Dr. Robert H. Brown Jr., who was leading Cellucci's treatment, before a Boston Red Sox game on May 19, 2011 at Fenway Park to announce the fundraising campaign. "I'm going to be talking to people from my old political network and I hope I can get some support there," Cellucci said. "We have a lot of people through the social network and we can really reach out across this country."

On March 15, 2012, Biogen Idec announced it was donating $500,000 to the UMass ALS Champion Fund, a substantial part of the $1.3 million that the fund raised in its first year.

Cellucci died of complications from his disease on June 8, 2013. He was 65. Governor Deval Patrick released a statement saying that "Massachusetts lost a favored son and devoted public servant today. A lawyer, legislator, governor and diplomat, Paul Cellucci was also a kind man and a friend." Former governor Bill Weld said "Paul Cellucci was simply one of the finest human beings I have ever met. I happened to know him in the realm of politics and government, but anyone who knew him in any other arena would have found the same man: a person of rock-hard integrity, keen intelligence, considerable humor, abundant compassion, and deep devotion to family and country. We are all immensely impoverished by his loss." Former governor Mitt Romney wrote a message on Twitter saying "Ann and I are saddened by the loss of our friend Gov. Paul Cellucci. Our hearts and prayers are with Jan and the Cellucci family." "I had the chance to work with Ambassador Cellucci when I was a minister in the province of Ontario. I can attest to the fact he was a great friend to Canada, and we are grateful for his contributions to the bilateral relationship, both as ambassador and as governor of Massachusetts," said Canadian Foreign Minister John Baird.

A memorial was dedicated to Cellucci on September 20, 2015 in his hometown of Hudson, Massachusetts by the Hudson Rotary Club.

Massachusetts House of Representatives
Preceded by Wilfred Balthazar	Member of the Massachusetts House of Representatives from the 51st Middlesex district 1977–1979	Succeeded by Constituency abolished
Preceded by Charles Flaherty	Member of the Massachusetts House of Representatives from the 3rd Middlesex district 1979–1985	Succeeded by Patricia Walrath
Massachusetts Senate
Preceded by Chester Atkins	Member of the Massachusetts Senate from the Middlesex and Worcester district 1985–1991	Succeeded by Robert Durand
Political offices
Preceded by Evelyn Murphy	Lieutenant Governor of Massachusetts; 1991–1999	Succeeded by Jane Swift
Preceded by Bill Weld	Governor of Massachusetts; 1999–2001; Acting: 1997–1999	Succeeded by Jane Swift; Acting
Party political offices
Preceded by Nicholas Nikitas	Republican nominee for Lieutenant Governor of Massachusetts; 1990, 1994	Succeeded by Jane Swift
Preceded by Bill Weld	Republican nominee for Governor of Massachusetts; 1998	Succeeded by Mitt Romney
Diplomatic posts
Preceded by Gordon Giffin	United States Ambassador to Canada; 2001–2005	Succeeded by David Wilkins
