= Patricia Walrath =

Member of Massachusetts House of Representatives

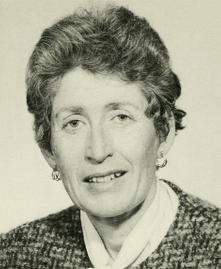

Member of the Massachusetts House of Representatives from the 3rd Middlesex district
- In office 1985–2009
- Preceded by: Paul Cellucci
- Succeeded by: Kate Hogan

Personal details
- Born: August 11, 1941 (age 85) Brainerd, Minnesota
- Party: Democratic
- Education: Bemidji State University; State University of New York at Oswego
- Occupation: Politician

Patricia A. Walrath (born August 11, 1941, in Brainerd, Minnesota) is an American politician who represented the 3rd Middlesex District in the Massachusetts House of Representatives from 1985 to 2009, was a member of the Stow, Massachusetts, Board of Selectmen from 1980 to 1986, and the Stow Finance Committee from 1977 to 1980.
