= William I. Randall =

Massachusetts politician (1915–2012)

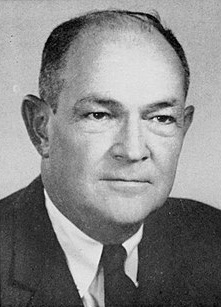

Member of the Massachusetts House of Representatives from the 8th Middlesex district
- In office 1951–1965

Massachusetts Senate's Middlesex and Worcester district
- In office 1965–1970

Personal details
- Born: September 13, 1915 Framingham, Massachusetts
- Died: March 4, 2012 (aged 96) Longboat Key, Florida
- Education: Yale College (BA); Harvard Law School (JD)

Williams I. Randall (September 13, 1915– March 4, 2012) was an American politician who was the member of the Massachusetts House of Representatives from the 8th Middlesex district and the Massachusetts Senate representing the Massachusetts Senate's Middlesex and Worcester district.
