= Stephen P. LeDuc =

American politician (born 1968)

Stephen LeDuc
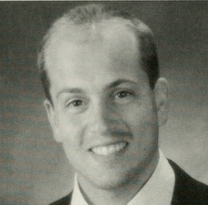
- LeDuc in 2005

Member of the Massachusetts House of Representatives from the 4th Middlesex district
- In office January 1997 – January 2009
- Preceded by: Daniel J. Valianti
- Succeeded by: Danielle Gregoire

Member of the Marlborough City Council
- In office 1996–1997
- In office 1990–1993

Personal details
- Born: February 29, 1968 (age 58) Marlborough, Massachusetts
- Party: Democratic
- Education: Framingham State University (BA)
- Profession: Legislator, assistant clerk magistrate

Stephen P. LeDuc is a former American state legislator who served in the Massachusetts House of Representatives from 1997 to 2009.

== Political career ==
Prior to being a state representative, LeDuc was a member of the Marlborough City Council from 1990 to 1993 and 1996 to 1997. In 2008, then-representative LeDuc took out nomination papers to run for the State Senate after Pam Resor announced she would not seek re-election. Instead, LeDuc chose not to run, and accepted a position as an assistant clerk magistrate at the Marlborough District Courthouse.
