= Steven Levy (politician) =

American politician

Member of the Massachusetts House of Representatives from the 4th Middlesex district
- In office January 5, 2011 – January 2, 2013
- Preceded by: Danielle Gregoire
- Succeeded by: Danielle Gregoire

Member of the Marlborough City Council at-large
- In office 2006–2011

Personal details
- Born: March 9, 1965 (age 61) Revere, Massachusetts
- Party: Republican
- Education: Baylor University (BBA) Boston College (MBA)
- Profession: Legislator, accountant, small business owner

Steven L. Levy is a former American state legislator who served in the Massachusetts House of Representatives from 2011 to 2013.

== Political career ==
Levy was made chairman of the Marlborough, Massachusetts Republican City Committee in 2004. On November 1, 2005, he was elected to the Marlborough City Council as an at-large member, receiving 2,805 votes. Levy unsuccessfully ran against Democrat Jamie Eldridge for the Middlesex & Worcester state senate district seat in 2008. In 2010, Levy challenged incumbent state representative Danielle Gregoire; narrowly defeating her in the general election with 50.3% of the overall vote. Gregoire challenged Levy to a rematch in 2012, in which Levy was defeated by 214 votes.

== Personal life ==
Levy and his wife, Sharon, have two children. He is the owner of Ledger Plus Accounting and Finance in Marlborough, Massachusetts.

== Electoral history ==
=== 2012 ===
2012 Massachusetts 4th Middlesex District general election
Party	Candidate	Votes	%
Democratic	Danielle W. Gregoire	9,135	50.5
Republican	Steven L. Levy (Incumbent)	8,921	49.3
Write-in		30	0.2
Total votes		19,348	100.0

=== 2010 ===
2010 Massachusetts 4th Middlesex District general election
Party	Candidate	Votes	%
Republican	Steven L. Levy	7,443	50.3
Democratic	Danielle W. Gregoire (Incumbent)	7,343	49.6
Write-in		14	0.1
Total votes		15,455	100.0

=== 2008 ===
2008 Middlesex & Worcester Senate District general election
Party	Candidate	Votes	%
Democratic	James B. Eldridge	46,458	57.0
Republican	Steven L. Levy	34,989	42.9
Write-in		73	0.1
Total votes		88,547	100.0
