= James Kerasiotes =

American politician

Director of the Massachusetts Turnpike Authority
- In office July 1, 1996 – April 11, 2000
- Preceded by: Allan R. McKinnon
- Succeeded by: Andrew Natsios

Secretary of Transportation of Massachusetts
- In office 1992–1998
- Governor: Bill Weld; Paul Cellucci
- Preceded by: Richard L. Taylor
- Succeeded by: Patrick J. Moynihan

Personal details
- Party: Republican
- Profession: Newspaper Publisher

James J. Kerasiotes (born 1953 or 1954) is an American politician who served as the director of the Massachusetts Turnpike Authority and the project manager of the Big Dig in Boston during the 1990s.

After serving as Secretary of Transportation in the Cabinets of Governors William Weld and Paul Celluci from 1992 to 1998, Kerasiotis was appointed to the Turnpike Authority, and quickly established a reputation as a hard-nosed manager who often fired people. As the cost of the megaproject spiraled out of control, Kerasiotis publicly reassured the public that the project was on track, though he privately quarreled with the project's construction firm, Bechtel. He was asked to resign by Massachusetts governor Paul Celucci on April 11, 2000. The Big Dig was officially completed in December 2007 at a cost of $8.08 billion (1982 dollars).

Before entering state government, Kerasiotes was publisher of NewsWest, a suburban newspaper in eastern Massachusetts, and later a director of Tab Communications, a chain of weekly newspapers west of Boston. He also was involved in the creation of the monster board.

In July 2014, Kerasiotes was charged in federal court with filing false personal income tax returns. He pleaded guilty on September 11, 2014, before Judge William G. Young and was sentenced to 6 months in prison.
