= Allan R. McKinnon =

American politician (1930–2019)

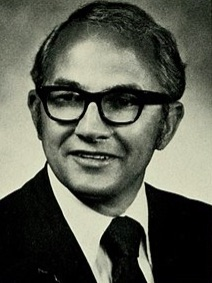
- Allan R. McKinnon,1983

Member of the Massachusetts Senate from the Plymouth and Norfolk District
- In office 1971–1985
- Preceded by: William D. Weeks
- Succeeded by: William B. Golden

Chairman of the Massachusetts Turnpike Authority
- In office January 1, 1988 – June 30, 1996
- Preceded by: John T. Driscoll
- Succeeded by: James Kerasiotes

Personal details
- Born: June 2, 1930 Weymouth, Massachusetts
- Died: January 29, 2019 (aged 88) Plymouth, Massachusetts
- Party: Democratic
- Spouse: Anne McKinnon (deceased)
- Education: Tufts University
- Profession: Teacher

Allan Robert McKinnon (June 2, 1930 – January 29, 2019) was a Massachusetts politician who served as a member of the Massachusetts State Senate from 1971 to 1985, Deputy Secretary of Transportation from 1985 to 1988, and Chairman of the Massachusetts Turnpike Authority from 1988 to 1996. He retired in 1996.

== Early life ==
He was raised by his mother, Sue (Farrar) McKinnon, in Weymouth, the youngest of 9 children. His father, Joseph McKinnon, died when he was 8 years old in 1938. He resided in Weymouth throughout his career with his wife, Anne (McLaughlin) McKinnon (1933–2001). He has four children; Kerin (1959-), Kevin (1964–2010), Sean (1967-) and Megan (1972-).

After graduating from Tufts in 1955, McKinnon taught history and government in Weymouth and Holbrook, Massachusetts. He served as Weymouth's Public Works Commissioner from 1958 to 1963 and was a member of the town's Board of Assessors from 1963 to 1975.

== Political career ==
McKinnon was the State Senator from the Norfolk and Plymouth District from 1971 to 1985. While serving in the senate, he continued teaching American History in the evenings at Quincy Junior College. He was known as a political opponent of Senate President William M. Bulger, an opponent of the death penalty, and a supporter of forced busing in Boston. McKinnon decided not to run for reelection in 1984 and was appointed Deputy Secretary of Transportation.

In 1987 he was appointed by Governor Michael Dukakis to serve as Chairman of the Massachusetts Turnpike Authority. As Turnpike Chairman, he oversaw repairs to the Callahan and Sumner tunnels, increased the amount of Jersey barriers on state highways, and established highway litter patrols and wildflower programs. During his tenure, Massachusetts had the fewest fatalities on major turnpikes in the United States.
