= Daniel J. Valianti =

American politician

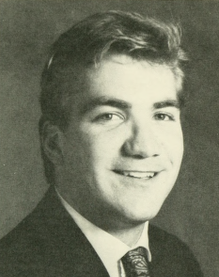

Member of the Massachusetts House of Representatives from the 4th Middlesex district
- In office 1991–1997
- Preceded by: Robert A. Durand
- Succeeded by: Stephen P. LeDuc

Personal details
- Born: c.1966
- Party: Democratic

Daniel J. Valianti (born c.1966) is an American former state legislator who served in the Massachusetts House of Representatives from 1991 to 1997.

== Political career ==
Valianti began his career working on various municipal political campaign's in his hometown of Marlborough, Massachusetts. In 1990, he successfully sought the Democratic nomination for the 4th Middlesex district seat in the Massachusetts House of Representatives; receiving 39.7% of the vote in the three-candidate primary. He went on to defeat Republican Marc Decourcey in the general election by 1,369 votes.

Valianti was re-elected in 1992 and 1994, but did not seek a fourth term.
