= Simon Cataldo =

American politician (born 1986)

Member of the Massachusetts House of Representatives from the 14th Middlesex district
- Incumbent
- Assumed office January 4, 2023
- Preceded by: Tami Gouveia

Personal details
- Born: July 19, 1986 (age 40)
- Party: Democratic
- Education: Colorado College (BS); University of Virginia (JD)
- Website: https://simoncataldo.com/

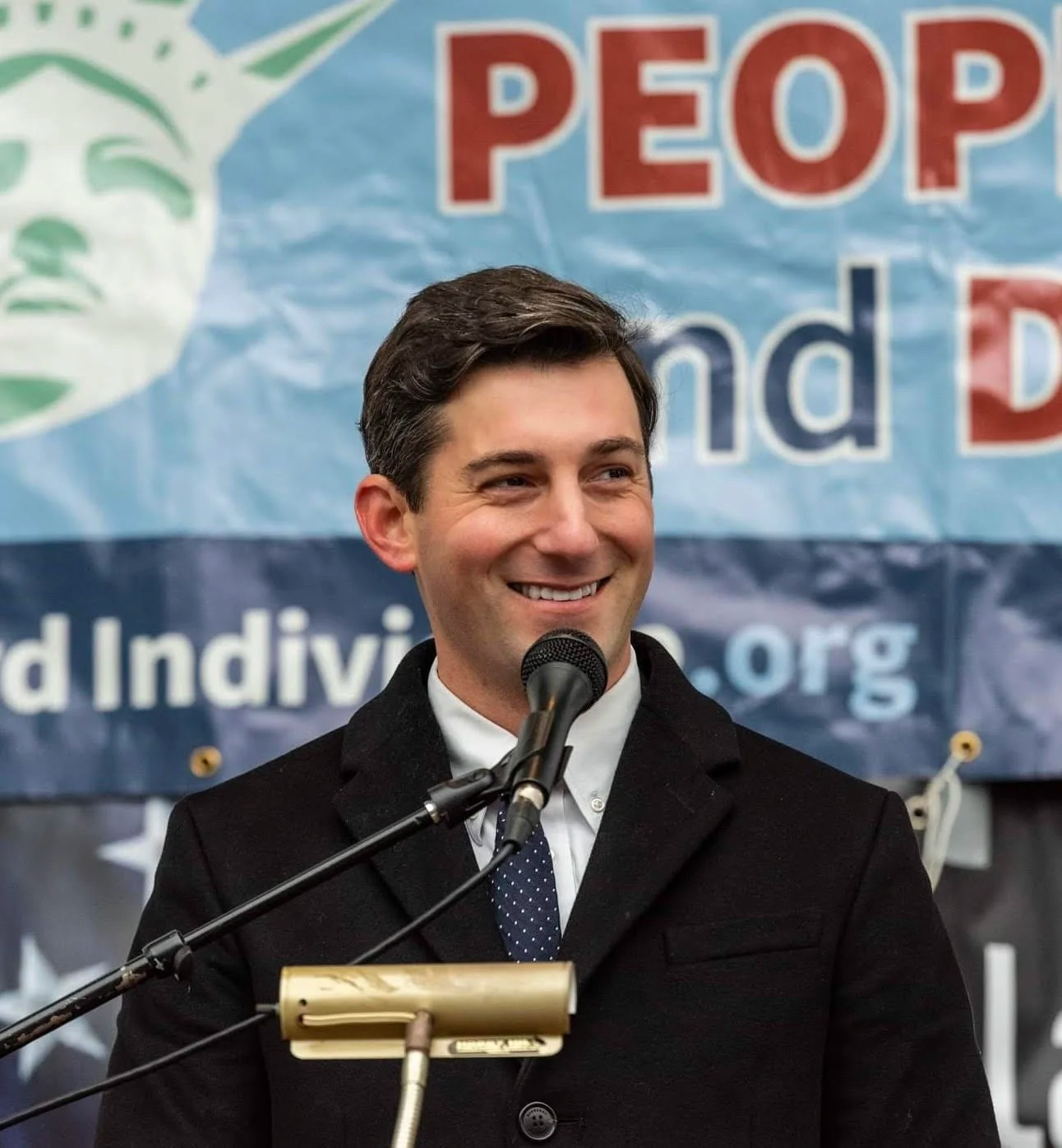
Representative Simon Cataldo speaking at a Concord Indivisible event.

Simon Joseph Cataldo (born July 19, 1986) is an American politician who represents the 14th Middlesex District in the Massachusetts House of Representatives. He represents the town of Carlisle, and parts of the towns of Acton, Chelmsford, and Concord.

== Early life and career ==
Cataldo grew up in West Concord, Massachusetts, with his parents and two sisters. His mother was a Concord Family Services social worker, and his father is an economist who has taught accounting at Suffolk University and the University of Rhode Island. Cataldo attended Thoreau Elementary, Peabody Middle School, and graduated from Concord-Carlisle Regional High School.

Cataldo attended Colorado College and graduated magna cum laude with a degree in Environmental Science. At Colorado College, Cataldo contributed to research on the kinetics of biodiesel production.

After teaching special education for three years and developing the program that became Harlem Lacrosse, Cataldo enrolled at the University of Virginia Law School. While at UVA, Cataldo was selected to be the managing editor of the Virginia Law Review.

Cataldo was recognized with the Ritter Award, given to four students who exemplify the honor, character, and integrity envisioned by Thomas Jefferson when he founded the University. Upon graduation, Cataldo also received the James C. Slaughter Honor Award, which is presented to an outstanding member of the graduating class.

== Teaching and Harlem Lacrosse ==
Following his graduation from Colorado College, Cataldo joined Teach for America and was placed as a special education math teacher at Frederick Douglass Academy (FDA), a 6–12th grade school in Harlem, New York City.

Cataldo started Harlem’s first public middle school lacrosse team. He later founded Harlem Lacrosse, a national school-based nonprofit operating in public schools in Baltimore, Boston, Harlem, the Bronx, Philadelphia, and Los Angeles. The students in the program experienced improvements in academic performance.

== U.S. Department of Justice and public corruption prosecutor ==
After graduating from Law School, Cataldo clerked for William J. Kayatta Jr., one of President Obama’s federal court of appeals appointees. He was later drafted into the Department of Justice’s (DOJ) Honors Program to prosecute public corruption in the DOJ’s Public Integrity Section, a specialized section of the Justice Department dedicated to combating public corruption and election crimes. At the DOJ, Cataldo investigated and prosecuted some of the most high-profile corruption cases in the country, including the successful trial of Arizona Sheriff Joe Arpaio, who was found guilty of criminal contempt and then pardoned by then-U.S. President Donald Trump.

Cataldo also prosecuted Joseph Boeckmann, a state judge in Arkansas, for a bribery and fraud scheme in addition to witness tampering, and Scott Maddox, the former Chair of the Florida Democratic Party, for RICO, fraud, and bribery. Cataldo also led the prosecution of James King, a former U.S. Department of Veterans Affairs official who was convicted of steering disabled veterans to sham vocational schools in exchange for bribes from the school owners. While serving at the Department of Justice, Cataldo was a substantial contributor to the Federal Prosecution of Election Offenses Manual, which serves as the Department of Justice’s comprehensive guidance on campaign finance and election-related criminal statutes.

== Massachusetts House of Representatives ==
=== Elections ===
Cataldo mounted his campaign for State Representative in the summer of 2021, after incumbent Tami Gouveia announced that she would run for Lieutenant Governor. Cataldo’s campaign focused on local issues such as addressing PFAS pollution in the drinking water supply, transportation infrastructure, adequately funding public schools, as well as broader challenges involving reproductive rights, mental health services, economic vitality, and climate change.

In the Democratic primary, Cataldo defeated two primary opponents, Vivian Birchall of Acton and Patricia Wojtas of Chelmsford. The result of the primary was 57.4% for Cataldo, 27.4% for Birchall, and 14.8% for Wojtas. Cataldo was endorsed over his primary opponents by Planned Parenthood Advocacy Fund of Massachusetts, the Massachusetts AFL-CIO, and the Massachusetts Nurses Association, in addition to other labor and environmental groups and many local Select Board and School Committee members.

In the general election, Cataldo consolidated support from Democrats and Independents to beat Republican Rodney Cleaves of Chelmsford, 72.8% to 27.2%.

=== Legislation ===
Cataldo's legislation covers early childhood education, higher education admissions, renewable energy, workforce development, tax relief, public safety, and substance use recovery. He was appointed by Speaker of the House Ron Mariano to be the House’s sole Member of the state’s Restorative Justice Advisory Committee.

In the 194th General Court, Cataldo serves as House vice chair on the Joint Committee on the Environment and Natural Resources and sits on the Joint Committees on Education, the Judiciary, and Financial Services.

Cataldo filed legislation in the 2025-26 session addressing:

- data privacy, including a proposed Massachusetts Neural Data Privacy Protection Act (with Rep. Andres Vargas), which was included in the omnibus data privacy bill that passed the House;
- diaper-insufficiency assistance and diaper-changing station requirements in public buildings;
- terminology and investigative practices concerning people with disabilities;
- election law, including ranked-choice voting and youth voting measures for the towns of Acton and Concord; and
- environmental measures, including a proposed ban on second-generation anticoagulant rodenticides in Concord and Chelmsford.

==== Evidence-Based Literacy ====
On January 16, 2025, Cataldo filed House Bill 698, "An Act to promote high-quality early literacy instruction and improve student outcomes," together with Representatives Danillo Sena of Acton. The bill sought to require Massachusetts public schools to adopt "evidence-based" reading instruction grounded in the "science of reading," centered on five components: phonemic awareness, phonics, vocabulary, fluency, and comprehension. It also directed the state Department of Elementary and Secondary Education (DESE) to publish approved curricula and professional-development resources and to require universal screening for reading difficulties.

A related bill on teacher preparation and literacy was separately filed by Representative Alice Peisch of Wellesley.

The Joint Committee on Education held a hearing on the bill on September 16, 2025. The committee advanced a redrafted, consolidated version of the Cataldo–Sena and Peisch bills on October 21, 2025, as House Bill 4642. The redraft cleared committee with bipartisan support and no opposing votes, while the Senate passed a similar version of the bill.

Cataldo was named by the Speaker to the six-member conference committee tasked with reconciling the bills, along with Representative John Marsi and Senators Sal DiDomenico, Jason Lewis, Patrick O'Connor, and Representative Kenneth Gordon.

The compromise bill, House No. 5511, was enacted by the Legislature on June 18, 2026. It:

- establishes statewide standards for evidence-based reading instruction in kindergarten through third grade;

requires universal early-literacy screening; expands teacher training and preparation-program requirements;

- limits use of the three-cueing method;
- and creates reporting requirements to track district implementation and student progress, while preserving (though not fully funding) the early literacy fund.

Governor Maura Healey signed the bill into law on June 26, 2026, in a ceremony with second-grade students, calling reading proficiency foundational to later academic and life success. With its passage, Massachusetts joined more than 40 states that have enacted "science of reading" legislation over the preceding decade. The reform followed a 2023 Boston Globe investigation that found roughly half of Massachusetts school districts were using reading curricula the state itself had rated low-quality.

==== Environmental Legislation ====
Hanscom Airfield Private Jet Expansion

Cataldo’s work to rein in private jet expansion at Hanscom Field is among his most significant legislative efforts. Hanscom, in Bedford, is operated by the Massachusetts Port Authority (Massport) and is New England's largest general-aviation and private-jet airport; a 2023 Institute for Policy Studies report found at least half of its flights were recreational or luxury trips.

Massport and a private developer have sought to build a roughly 522,000-square-foot expansion of jet hangar space, opposed by local residents, climate advocates, and the group Stop Private Jet Expansion at Hanscom or Anywhere.

Cataldo, along with other Hanscom-area House members and Senator Michael Barrett in the Senate, championed an amendment overhauling Massport's 1956 charter, which had never previously been updated. The measure, included in a comprehensive climate bill, required Massport to weigh "environmental protection and resilience, reductions in greenhouse gas emissions, and environmental justice principles" alongside its traditional commerce and economic-growth mission. It passed the Senate 38–2, and the House 128–17, and Governor Healey signed it into law on November 20, 2024, shortly before the start of the 194th session.

In July 2024, Cataldo and his colleagues wrote to state environmental officials criticizing Massport's environmental impact filings as "cavalier," and in April 2025 he joined other Hanscom-area legislators and a coalition of cultural and environmental figures — including descendants of Ralph Waldo Emerson and Henry David Thoreau — in urging Governor Healey to halt the hangar project outright.

Dark Skies

Cataldo and Representative Sean Garballey have for several sessions sponsored "An Act to improve outdoor lighting, conserve energy, and increase dark-sky visibility," refiled in the 194th session as House Bill 3494 with Senator Cynthia Creem's companion bill in the Senate.

The legislation would require fully shielded outdoor lighting fixtures, cap color temperature at 3000 Kelvin, and reduce light pollution and municipal electricity costs for street lighting. The bill has advanced further in the 194th session than in prior attempts: it was reported favorably out of committee in March 2026, added as an amendment to the House's environmental bond bill on June 17–18, 2026, and passed by the Senate as a standalone measure (S.3145) on July 1, 2026, by a 39–0 vote. As of early August 2026, the House and Senate versions await reconciliation, likely through a conference committee. The Boston Globe editorial board endorsed the legislation in July 2026.

Other legislation

Cataldo has also sponsored home-rule legislation authorizing the towns of Concord and Chelmsford to ban second-generation anticoagulant rodenticides, a petition (with Representative Sean Garballey) to fund water infrastructure and economic target areas, and a bill to establish a Great Brook State Park trust fund.

==== Restorative Justice ====
Massachusetts's 2018 Criminal Justice Reform Act created the Restorative Justice Advisory Committee (RJAC), a 17-member statutory body that monitors and recommends policy for community-based restorative justice programs used as alternatives or complements to prosecution. Cataldo has served as the House Speaker's appointee to the RJAC since September 2023, succeeding Representative Garballey.

Following RJAC research recommending a permanent state-level restorative justice office, Cataldo and Garballey, joined by Representative Paul J. Donato, filed House Bill 3303 in the 194th session to establish an Office of Restorative Justice within the Executive Office for Administration and Finance to build statewide restorative-justice capacity. As of mid-2026 the bill remained before the House Committee on State Administration and Regulatory Oversight.

==== Combating Antisemitism ====
In 2024, Cataldo was appointed co-chair of the Massachusetts Special Commission on Combating Antisemitism, a state legislative commission created through the fiscal year 2025 state budget to study and recommend responses to antisemitism in the Commonwealth alongside Senator John C. Velis (D–Westfield).

The commission was charged with examining antisemitism across multiple sectors of Massachusetts life, including K–12 and higher education, law enforcement and public safety, workplaces, and religious institutions. Its membership included Jewish community leaders, municipal officials, educators, and law enforcement officials, in addition to its two legislative co-chairs.

Beginning in early 2025, the commission held a series of public hearings, ultimately gathering testimony from roughly 200 speakers alongside Massachusetts- and national-level data on antisemitic incidents. Commission witnesses included academics, law enforcement officials, education officials, and community members describing firsthand experiences of antisemitism.

One hearing, in February 2025, drew attention after Cataldo and Velis questioned the president of the Massachusetts Teachers Association about educational materials the union had distributed regarding the Israel–Hamas conflict, which the co-chairs said lacked Jewish and Israeli perspectives and included imagery they characterized as antisemitic. The exchange grew tense, and Cataldo was heckled by an audience member during the questioning, which elicited cheers from audience members. Cataldo and Senator John Velis were later criticized by multiple media outlets for their questioning tactics and for using the commission as political grandstanding.

The commission also solicited testimonials directly from students who had experienced antisemitism in Massachusetts public or private K–12 schools, inviting some to testify before the full commission.

On August 7, 2025, ahead of the new school year, the commission voted to adopt a "Preliminary K-12 Education Findings and Recommendations" report intended to guide state agencies and local school districts in preventing and responding to antisemitic incidents.

The commission released its final report on December 1, 2025, after more than a year of work. Its recommendations were organized around several themes, including:

- Identifying a “Massachusetts Way” of combating antisemitism that different from the Trump administration’s weaponization of antisemitism;

strengthening legal protections against discrimination and harassment;

- enhancing the safety and security of Jewish residents, institutions, and places of worship;
- fostering allyship among religious, cultural, and ethnic communities to counter hate; and
- improving mechanisms for reporting and collecting data on bias- and hate-motivated incidents.

At a State House event highlighting the report, Cataldo credited the leadership of House Speaker Ronald Mariano and Senate President Karen Spilka in making the commission possible, and state leaders including Lieutenant Governor Kim Driscoll, Governor Maura Healey, and Attorney General Andrea Campbell voiced support for the recommendations and committed to working toward their implementation.

The final report received praise from numerous officials, including U.S. Senators Elizabeth Warren and Ed Markey; Congress Members Katherine Clark, Jake Auchincloss, and Lori Trahan; Boston Mayor Michelle Wu; and Jewish community organizations, who described it as a comprehensive blueprint for addressing antisemitism in Massachusetts institutions.

== Personal life ==
Cataldo currently lives in Concord, Massachusetts with his wife and four children.
