= Dan W. Reicher =

American lawyer

Dan Reicher
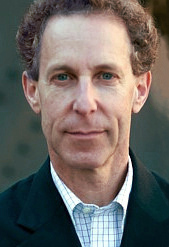

Personal details
- Born: Dan William Reicher; June 30, 1956 (age 69); Syracuse, New York, U.S.
- Political party: Democratic
- Education: Dartmouth College (BA); Stanford University (JD)

Dan William Reicher is an American lawyer who was U.S. Assistant Secretary of Energy for Energy Efficiency and Renewable Energy at the U.S. Department of Energy (DOE) in the Clinton Administration. Reicher is currently executive director of the Steyer-Taylor Center for Energy Policy and Finance at Stanford University, a joint center of the Stanford Graduate School of Business and Stanford Law School, where he also holds faculty positions. Reicher joined Stanford in 2011 from Google, where he served since 2007 as Director of Climate Change and Energy Initiatives for the company's venture Google.org.

Reicher also served as an advisor to the 2008 Obama campaign and a member of the Obama Transition Team where he focused on the energy portions of the Obama stimulus package.

Following the 2008 U.S. presidential election, Reicher was considered for the post of Energy Secretary in the Obama Administration but physicist Steven Chu was ultimately chosen.

Following his tenure in the Clinton administration, Reicher was as an energy investor with a private equity firm he co-founded, and where he served as president. He was also a cleantech executive with a venture capital-backed renewable energy company. Early in his career he served as a staff member of President Carter's Commission on the Accident at Three Mile Island.

In 2012 Reicher received an honorary doctorate from the State University of New York College of Environmental Science and Forestry and was also named one of the five most influential figures in U.S. clean energy by Oilprice.com.

== Career ==
Reicher directs Stanford's Steyer-Taylor Center for Energy Policy and Finance, which focuses on policy and finance mechanisms that advance clean energy in an economically sensible manner. He also co-teaches a graduate-level class on the business fundamentals and policy dimensions of cleantech and a seminar on the Chinese solar industry and its global implications.

Reicher is also a member of the Secretary of Energy Advisory Board, appointed by current Energy Secretary Ernest Moniz, the National Academy of Sciences Board on Energy and Environmental Systems, co-chairman of the board of the American Council on Renewable Energy, and a member of the board of American Rivers and the American Council for an Energy Efficient Economy.

At Google, Reicher served as director of climate change and energy initiatives for the company's venture Google.org which was capitalized with more than $1 billion of Google stock to make investments, advance policy, and develop products in the areas of climate change and energy, health, and global development. In the energy and climate area, Google.org developed home energy monitoring software called Google PowerMeter, worked on plug-in vehicles under the RechargeIT initiative, and made investments and advocated policies to lower the cost of renewable energy.

Prior to his position at Google, Reicher served as president and co-founder of New Energy Capital, a private equity firm funded by the California State Teachers Retirement System and Vantage Point Venture Partners to invest in clean energy projects. During Reicher's tenure, the firm invested in projects such as natural gas-fired cogeneration plants in California and Massachusetts, ethanol plants in Indiana and Michigan, a biodiesel plant in Delaware, and a biomass-fired power plant in Maine. Reicher also served as executive vice president of Northern Power Systems, one of the nation's oldest renewable energy companies. The company received significant venture capital investment, including from Nth Power and Arete Corporation to develop new technologies, including a permanent-magnet direct-drive 2.3 megawatt wind turbine.

Reicher was also an adjunct professor at the Yale University School of Forestry and Environmental Studies and Vermont Law School.

From 1997 to 2001, Reicher was assistant secretary of energy for energy efficiency and renewable energy at DOE. As assistant secretary, he directed annually more than $1 billion in investments in energy research, development and deployment related to renewable energy, distributed generation, and energy efficiency. During Reicher's tenure, DOE launched the Wind Powering America Initiative and the Geopowering the West Initiative, adopted new appliance and equipment efficiency standards, and oversaw the Million Solar Roofs Initiative and the Industries of the Future Initiative. Reicher was a member of the U.S. Delegation to the Climate Change Negotiations, co-chair of the U.S. Biomass Research and Development Board, and a member of the board of the government-industry Partnership for a New Generation of Vehicles.

Prior to his position as DOE Assistant Secretary, Reicher was chief of staff to Energy Secretary Hazel O'Leary (1996–1997), Assistant Secretary for Policy and International Affairs (Acting, 1995–1996), and deputy chief of staff and counselor to the secretary (1993–1995).

After leaving the Clinton administration in 2001, he was a consultant to the Senate Committee on Environment and Public Works and a visiting fellow at the World Resources Institute.

Prior to his roles at the Department of Energy and in the business community, Reicher was a senior attorney with the Natural Resources Defense Council where he focused on the federal government's energy and nuclear programs as well as environmental law and policy issues in the former Soviet Union. He was also previously assistant attorney general for environmental protection in Massachusetts, a law clerk to federal district court judge David Nelson in Boston, a legal assistant in the Hazardous Waste Section of the United States Department of Justice and a staff member of President Carter's Commission on the Accident at Three Mile Island.

== Personal ==
Reicher was born in Syracuse, New York, United States. His late father, Norbert B. Reicher, was a physician and his mother is a retired teacher. Reicher graduated with a B.A. in biology from Dartmouth College and a J.D. from Stanford Law School. He also studied at the Harvard's Kennedy School of Government and MIT. He was a member of the first group on record to kayak the Yangtze River in China and a National Geographic-sponsored expedition that was the first to navigate the entire 1888 mile Rio Grande. Reicher's college friend Senator Rob Portman (R-OH) was a member of both expeditions.

Reicher is married to Carole Parker, who headed the Office of Pollution Prevention at the U.S. Department of Defense from 1994 to 1999. Carole and Dan have three children, most notably Graham Reicher, and live in Warren, Vermont.
