= Trudy Coxe =

American non-profit executive (born 1948)

Massachusetts Secretary of Environmental Affairs
- In office 1993–1998
- Governor: William Weld; Paul Cellucci
- Preceded by: Susan Tierney
- Succeeded by: Robert Durand

Personal details
- Occupation: Non-profit executive

Gertrude M. "Trudy" Coxe (born 1948) is an American non-profit executive and CEO of the Preservation Society of Newport County, formerly the Secretary of Environmental Affairs in the Commonwealth of Massachusetts. She has advocated against the construction of offshore wind farms in Rhode Island, arguing that they cause "unnecessary loss to our community's irreplaceable character and sense of place."

== Biography ==
Coxe was born in 1948. She graduated from the Wheeler School in 1967.

As an employee of Save the Bay, Coxe helped organize the first annual Save the Bay swim in 1977, later serving as executive director of Save the Bay from 1979 to 1990. She ran an unsuccessful campaign as a Republican for Congress against Jack Reed in 1990. From 1993 to 1998 she served as Massachusetts' Secretary of Environmental Affairs under Governor Weld and Governor Cellucci. After leaving this position, she became C.E.O. of the Preservation Society of Newport County.

Coxe has served on various non-profit boards, including: "National Recreation and Park Association, the Appalachian Mountain Club, Grow Smart Rhode Island, the Rhode Island Commodores, the Metcalf Institute for Marine & Environmental Reporting, the Wheeler School, the Newport County Chamber of Commerce, Child and Family Services and the Attractions Council of Newport County."

Coxe is the recipient of honorary doctorate degrees from the University of Rhode Island, the Massachusetts Maritime Academy, and Roger Williams University.

== Preservation Society of Newport Lawsuit on Offshore Wind & Controversy ==
On November 22, the Preservation Society of Newport County (PSNC), under the leadership of Coxe, filed a lawsuit against the US Government in relation to the South Fork Wind and Revolution 1 offshore wind farms which are located off the Atlantic coast near Rhode Island—this is the Revolution 1 and this is the South Fork Wind appeal. PSNC released a press statement on the suit. In the statement, Coxe wrote, "We support green energy, for two years we pointed out serious problems with the federal permitting process, but BOEM never listened."

As summarized in Newport This Week,

The Preservation Society of Newport County has filed two lawsuits in U.S. District Court challenging the thoroughness and lawfulness of the federal Bureau of Ocean and Energy Management (BOEM) permitting review process, which has approved two offshore wind farms in Rhode Island waters. The lawsuits seek to appeal BOEM's approval of the projects, which are joint ventures between multinational energy giant Orsted and regional utility provider Eversource. They also seek an injunction to put a halt to construction until the court makes a decision regarding the appeal.

A public letter by multiple environmental and labor leaders in RI was addressed to Coxe in response, stating,

Opposition to clean energy is a privilege. It imposes pollution burdens on poorer communities and communities of color, as it slows down the transition away from fossil fuel electricity sources overwhelmingly placed in their backyards. The impacts of this delay can be felt for generations

Shortly after, Climate Action Rhode (CARI) Island protested the Newport Preservation Society Winter Gala. Coxe soon penned an op-ed in the Boston Globe, stating,

All we're asking is for the Bureau of Ocean Energy Management to follow the policies and procedures in the National Historic Preservation Act and the National Environmental Policy Act, laws in place for the last 50 years," and "I've been an environmentalist my whole life, including serving as Massachusetts secretary of environmental affairs, director of ocean and coastal resource management in the National Oceanic and Atmospheric Administration, and director of Save The Bay. From my experience in government and dealing with environmental opportunities and threats, I know that when the law is ignored or misused, the consequences can be painful and expensive.

Several months later, the Newport Energy and Environment Commission organized a public educational series on climate change and offshore wind. Coxe was invited to participate on a panel with CARI and declined, and in response Climate Action RI published a Boston Globe op-ed, stating,

If PSNC refuses to drop their lawsuit in the name of Newport and the environment, then PSNC should promise to donate any money received from their lawsuit to the county to pay for climate resilience through public infrastructure investment. Having opposed, and perhaps quashed, the bill to fund public infrastructure, the PSNC should offer other solutions to Newport County's vulnerabilities in the face of climate change. The money to keep the roads, beaches and walks open, the water supply potable, and the public safe will have to come from somewhere. Coxe has made clear she does not think the Preservation Society of Newport County should give up anything — not ticket sales and not their carefully preserved view to this end.
