= Gordon D. Giffin =

American diplomat (born 1949)

Gordon Giffin
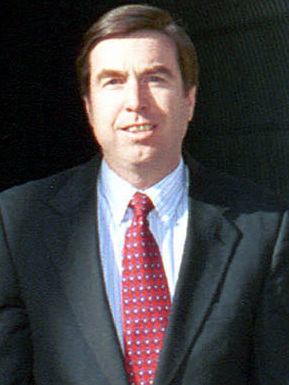

United States Ambassador to Canada
- In office September 17, 1997 – January 20, 2001
- President: Bill Clinton
- Preceded by: James Blanchard
- Succeeded by: Paul Cellucci

Personal details
- Born: Gordon Davies Giffin; December 29, 1949 (age 76) Springfield, Massachusetts
- Party: Democratic
- Education: Duke University (BA); Emory University (JD)
- Profession: Attorney

Gordon Davies Giffin (born December 29, 1949) became the 34th United States Ambassador to Canada on September 17, 1997.

Born in Springfield, Massachusetts, Gordon Giffin moved to Canada before his first birthday. He lived in Montreal and Toronto for 17 years, attending Valois Park Elementary School in Pointe Claire and Richview Collegiate in Etobicoke. Giffin earned a B.A. from Duke University in 1971, and a J.D. from Emory University School of Law in Atlanta, Georgia in 1974.

The Ambassador was nominated for his position by President Bill Clinton on July 1, 1997, and confirmed by the full United States Senate on July 31.

Prior to his appointment, Giffin practiced law as a senior partner in the firm of Long, Aldridge & Norman (now McKenna Long & Aldridge LLP). He has since returned to McKenna Long & Aldridge LLP, which has merged into Dentons LLP. He eads the firm's US Public Policy and Regulation practice. While on an ambassador's trip to Montreal he took in a Montreal Canadiens hockey game, where a Molson Ice was dumped on his head for his outward support of Bill Clinton. From 1975 to 1979, he was Legislative Director and Chief Counsel to U.S. Senator Sam Nunn in Washington, D.C.

He expressed confidence Hillary Clinton would become President of the United States of America in a November 8, 2016, interview with Canada's Business New Network (BNN), stating "I was there during the first Clinton Presidency and now we're about to have the second."

Giffin sits on the boards of several Canadian companies including Canadian National Railway, Canadian Imperial Bank of Commerce and Transalta.

Diplomatic posts
Preceded by James Blanchard	US Ambassador to Canada; July 31, 1997 – 2001	Succeeded by Paul Cellucci
