= Massachusetts House of Representatives' 14th Middlesex district =

American legislative district

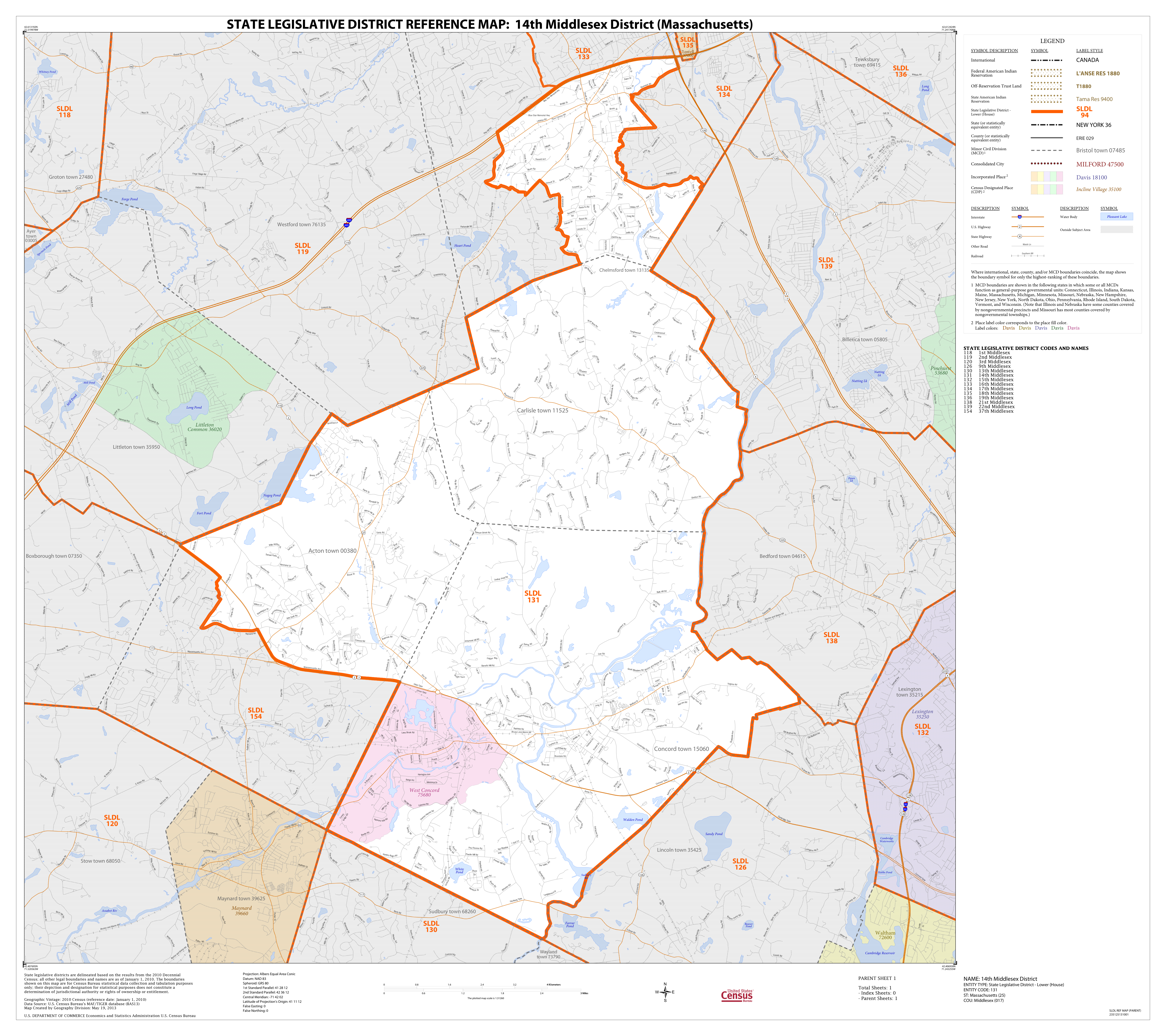
Map of Massachusetts House of Representatives' 14th Middlesex district, based on the 2010 United States census.

Massachusetts House of Representatives' 14th Middlesex district in the United States is one of 160 legislative districts included in the lower house of the Massachusetts General Court. It covers part of Middlesex County. Democrat Tami Gouveia of Acton represented the district from 2019–2023, when she gave up the seat to run for Lieutenant Governor.

The district is currently represented by Democrat Simon Cataldo of Concord.

== Towns represented ==
The district includes the following localities:

- part of Acton
- Carlisle
- part of Chelmsford
- Concord

The current district geographic boundary overlaps with those of the Massachusetts Senate's 3rd Middlesex district and Middlesex and Worcester district.

=== Former locales ===
The district previously covered:

- Holliston, circa 1872
- Sherborn, circa 1872

== Representatives ==
- Josiah H. Temple, circa 1858
- James W. Brown, circa 1859
- Montressor Tyler Allen, circa 1888
- Horace G. Wadlin, circa 1888
- Owen E. Brennen, circa 1920
- Charles Henry Slowey, circa 1920
- Cornelius F. Kiernan, circa 1951
- Raymond Joseph Lord, circa 1951
- Donald J. Manning, circa 1975
- John H. Loring
- Pam Resor
- Cory Atkins
- Tami L. Gouveia, 2019–2023
- Simon Cataldo, 2023–present

== See also ==
- List of Massachusetts House of Representatives elections
- List of Massachusetts General Courts
- List of former districts of the Massachusetts House of Representatives
- Other Middlesex County districts of the Massachusetts House of Representatives: 1st, 2nd, 3rd, 4th, 5th, 6th, 7th, 8th, 9th, 10th, 11th, 12th, 13th, 15th, 16th, 17th, 18th, 19th, 20th, 21st, 22nd, 23rd, 24th, 25th, 26th, 27th, 28th, 29th, 30th, 31st, 32nd, 33rd, 34th, 35th, 36th, 37th

== Images ==
Portraits of legislators

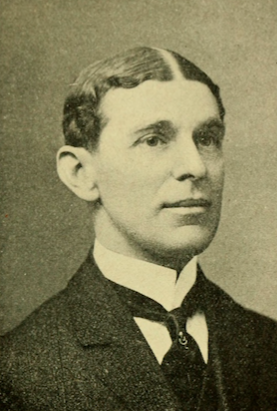
Edwin Kittredge

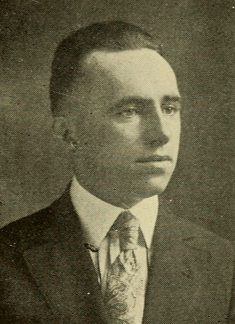
Charles Slowey

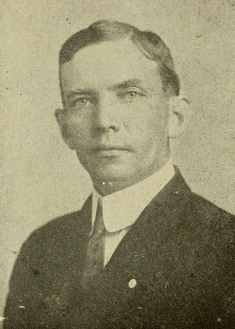
Dennis Murphy

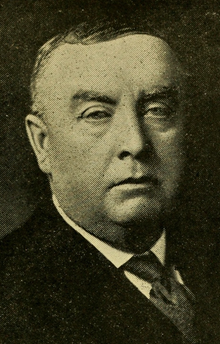
Owen Brennen

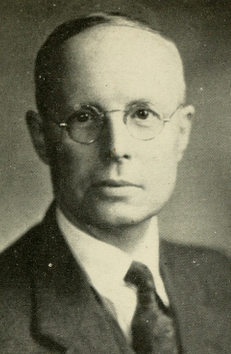
Albert Bergeron

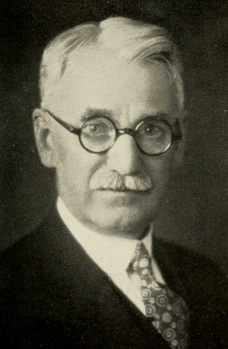
Frank MacLean

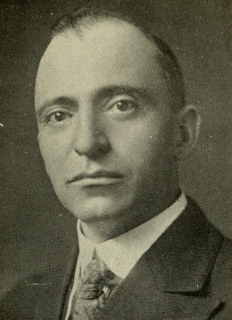
Henry Achin

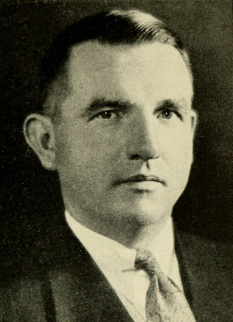
George Walsh

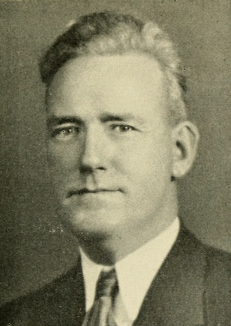
Joseph Sweeney

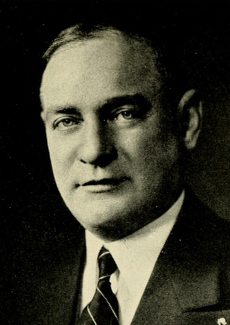
Wilfred Achin

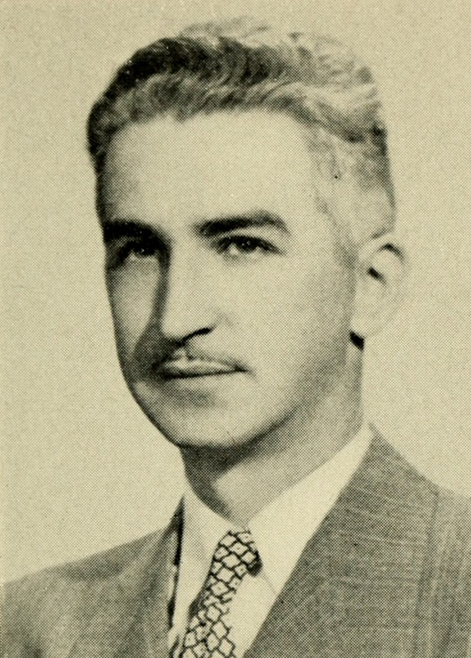
Cornelius Kiernan

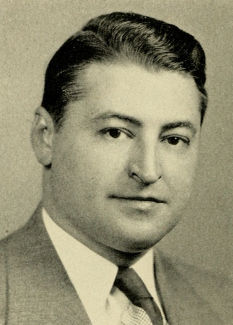
Raymond Joseph Lord

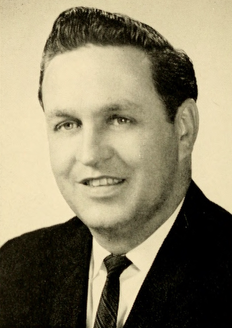
Paul Sheehy

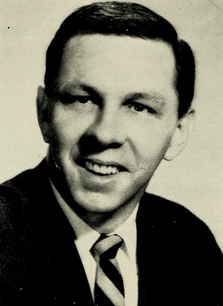
Donald Manning

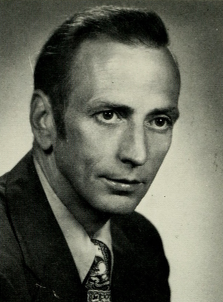
John Loring

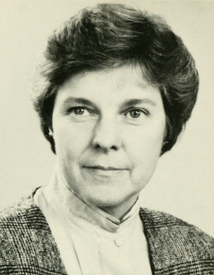
Pamela Resor

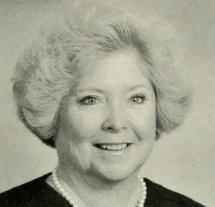
Cory Atkins

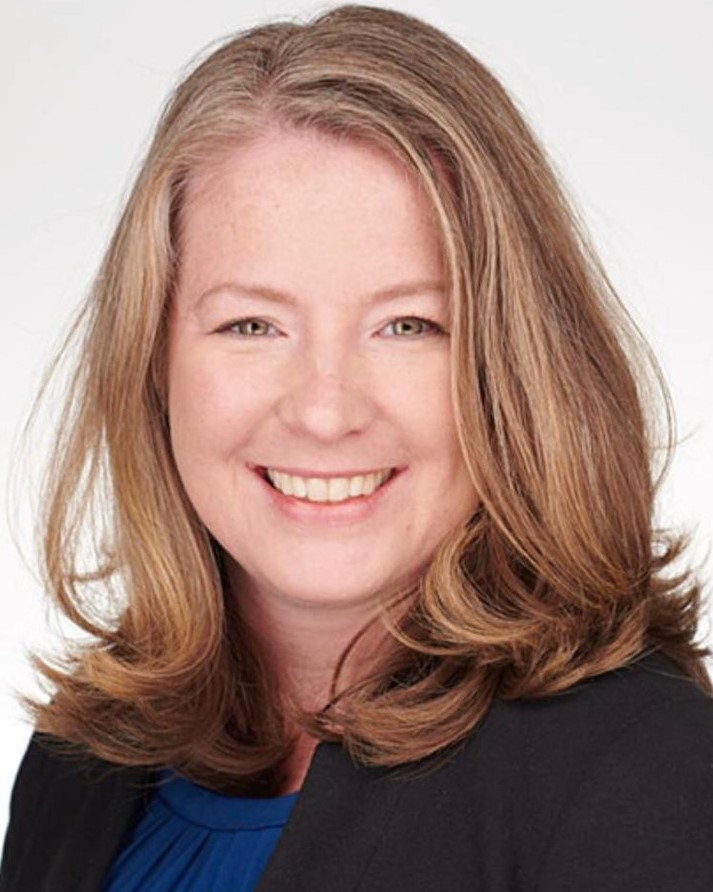
Tami Gouveia
