= Tami Gouveia =

American politician

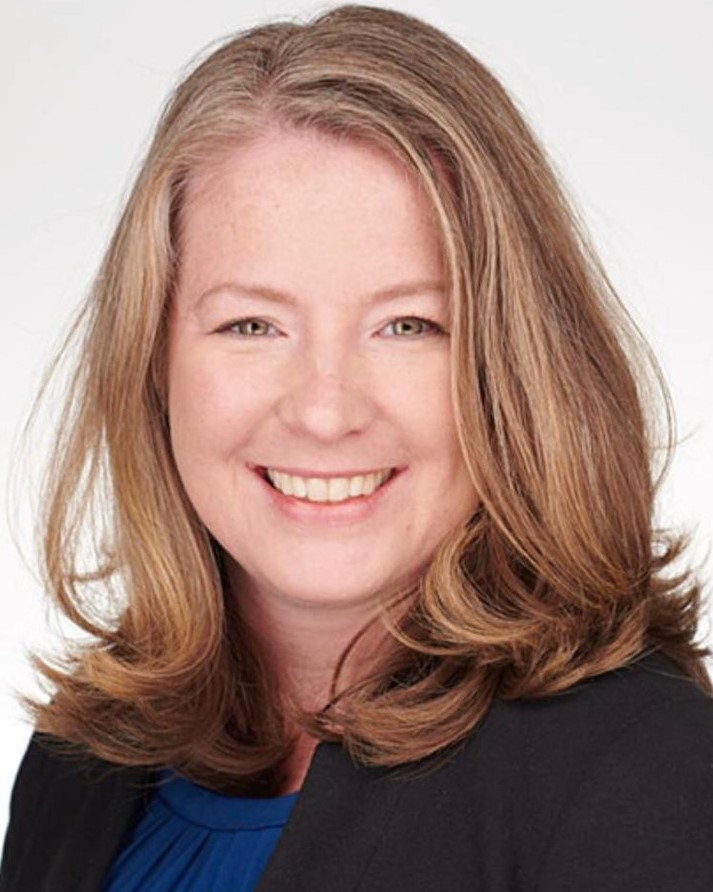

Member of the Massachusetts House of Representatives from the 14th Middlesex district
- In office January 2, 2019 – January 4, 2023
- Preceded by: Cory Atkins
- Succeeded by: Simon Cataldo

Personal details
- Born: c. 1985 Lowell, Massachusetts
- Party: Democratic
- Education: Mount Holyoke College (BA); Boston University (MSW, MPH, DPH)

Tami L. Gouveia is social worker and a former Massachusetts politician. She served as State Representative and then ran for Lieutenant Governor.

== Early and personal life ==
Gouveia grew up in Lowell and attended Lowell Catholic High School. Her mother and great-grandmother worked in the mills along the Merrimack River. She attended Mount Holyoke College, graduating with a Bachelor of Arts in 1991, before obtaining dual degrees in social work and public health in 2001 and 2002 from Boston University. She has a 25-year career in social work, and has worked at the Greater Lawrence Community Health Center. She is a single parent.

== Political career ==
She represented the 14th Middlesex District in the Massachusetts House of Representatives. She represented the towns of Concord and Carlisle, and parts of the towns of Acton and Chelmsford.

Gouveia served on the Joint Committee on Children, Families and Persons with Disabilities, the Joint Committee on Consumer Protection and Professional Licensure, the Joint Committee on Export Development, and Joint Committee on Mental Health, Substance Use and Recovery.

In 2021, she announced her candidacy for Lieutenant Governor for the election in 2022. She supported health care for all. She came in third out of the three candidates in the Democratic primary.

== See also ==
- 2021–2022 Massachusetts legislature
