= Danielle Gregoire =

American politician

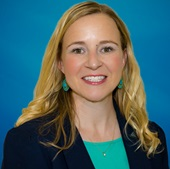

Member of the Massachusetts House of Representatives from the 4th Middlesex district
- Incumbent
- Assumed office January 2, 2013
- Preceded by: Steven L. Levy
- In office January 7, 2009 – January 5, 2011
- Preceded by: Stephen P. LeDuc
- Succeeded by: Steven L. Levy

Personal details
- Born: Danielle W. Gregoire; April 17, 1979 (age 47) Framingham, Massachusetts
- Party: Democratic
- Education: Saint Anselm College (BA); Suffolk University Law School (JD)
- Occupation: Legislator
- Website: www.votedaniellegregoire.com

Danielle W. Gregoire is an American state legislator serving in the Massachusetts House of Representatives. She is a Marlborough resident and a member of the Democratic Party.

== Early life and education ==
Gregoire attended Marlborough Public Schools. She received her bachelor's degree in Criminal Justice from St. Anselm College in Goffstown, New Hampshire. Upon graduating from St. Anselm, Gregoire served as a legislative aide to State Representative Stephen P. LeDuc. While working for Representative LeDuc, Gregoire attended night classes at Suffolk University Law School where she graduated in 2006. Gregoire passed the Massachusetts bar exam.

== Political career ==
In 2007, Gregoire was a candidate to represent Ward 2 on the Marlborough City Council. She lost her challenge to incumbent City Councilor Paul Ferro by 74 votes. In 2008, she ran to succeed her former boss, Representative LeDuc, in the Massachusetts House of Representatives. Gregoire received 9,044 votes defeating Republican, and future mayor of Marlborough, Arthur G. Vigeant, and Independent Joseph Valianti. In 2010, Gregoire narrowly lost her reelection bid to Republican challenger and then-Marlborough City Councilor Steven L. Levy. Gregoire and Levy faced off again in a rematch for the 4th Middlesex district seat in 2012, this time Gregoire edged out Levy by 214 votes. She has been reelected to the seat in 2014, 2016, 2018, 2020, 2022, and 2024.

== Electoral history ==
Danielle Gregoire's electoral history

2024 Massachusetts 4th Middlesex District general election
Party	Candidate	Votes	%
Democratic	Danielle W. Gregoire (Incumbent)	13,921	98.6
Write-in		194	1.4
Total votes		14.115	100.0

2022 Massachusetts 4th Middlesex District general election
Party	Candidate	Votes	%
Democratic	Danielle W. Gregoire (Incumbent)	10,157	98.7
Write-in		133	1.3
Total votes		10,290	100.0

=== 2020 ===
2020 Massachusetts 4th Middlesex District general election
Party	Candidate	Votes	%
Democratic	Danielle W. Gregoire (Incumbent)	13,989	70.9
Independent	Syed H. Hashmi	5,691	28.8
Write-in		64	0.3
Total votes		19,744	100.0

=== 2018 ===
2018 Massachusetts 4th Middlesex District general election
Party	Candidate	Votes	%
Democratic	Danielle W. Gregoire (Incumbent)	10,303	63.5
Republican	Paul R. Ferro	5,907	36.4
Write-in		21	0.1
Total votes		16,231	100.0

=== 2016 ===
2016 Massachusetts 4th Middlesex District general election
Party	Candidate	Votes	%
Democratic	Danielle W. Gregoire (Incumbent)	11,531	59.6
Republican	Paul R. Ferro	7,801	40.3
Write-in		27	0.1
Total votes		19,359	100.0

=== 2014 ===
2014 Massachusetts 4th Middlesex District general election
Party	Candidate	Votes	%
Democratic	Danielle W. Gregoire (Incumbent)	6,392	49.9
Republican	Matthew H. Elder	5,462	42.6
Independent	Kristine E. Coffey-Donahue	955	7.5
Write-in		6	0.0
Total votes		12,815	100.0

=== 2012 ===
2012 Massachusetts 4th Middlesex District general election
Party	Candidate	Votes	%
Democratic	Danielle W. Gregoire	9,135	50.5
Republican	Steven L. Levy (Incumbent)	8,921	49.3
Write-in		30	0.2
Total votes		18,086	100.0

=== 2010 ===
2010 Massachusetts 4th Middlesex District general election
Party	Candidate	Votes	%
Republican	Steven L. Levy	7,443	50.3
Democratic	Danielle W. Gregoire (Incumbent)	7,343	49.6
Write-in		14	0.1
Total votes		14,800	100.0

=== 2008 ===
2008 Massachusetts 4th Middlesex District general election
Party	Candidate	Votes	%
Democratic	Danielle W. Gregoire	9,044	48.0
Republican	Arthur G. Vigeant	8,296	42.6
Independent	Joseph L. Valianti	1,484	7.9
Write-in		23	0.1
Total votes		20,092	100.0

== See also ==
- Massachusetts House of Representatives' 4th Middlesex district
- 2019–2020 Massachusetts legislature
- 2021–2022 Massachusetts legislature
