= Massachusetts Senate's Middlesex and Worcester district =

American legislative district

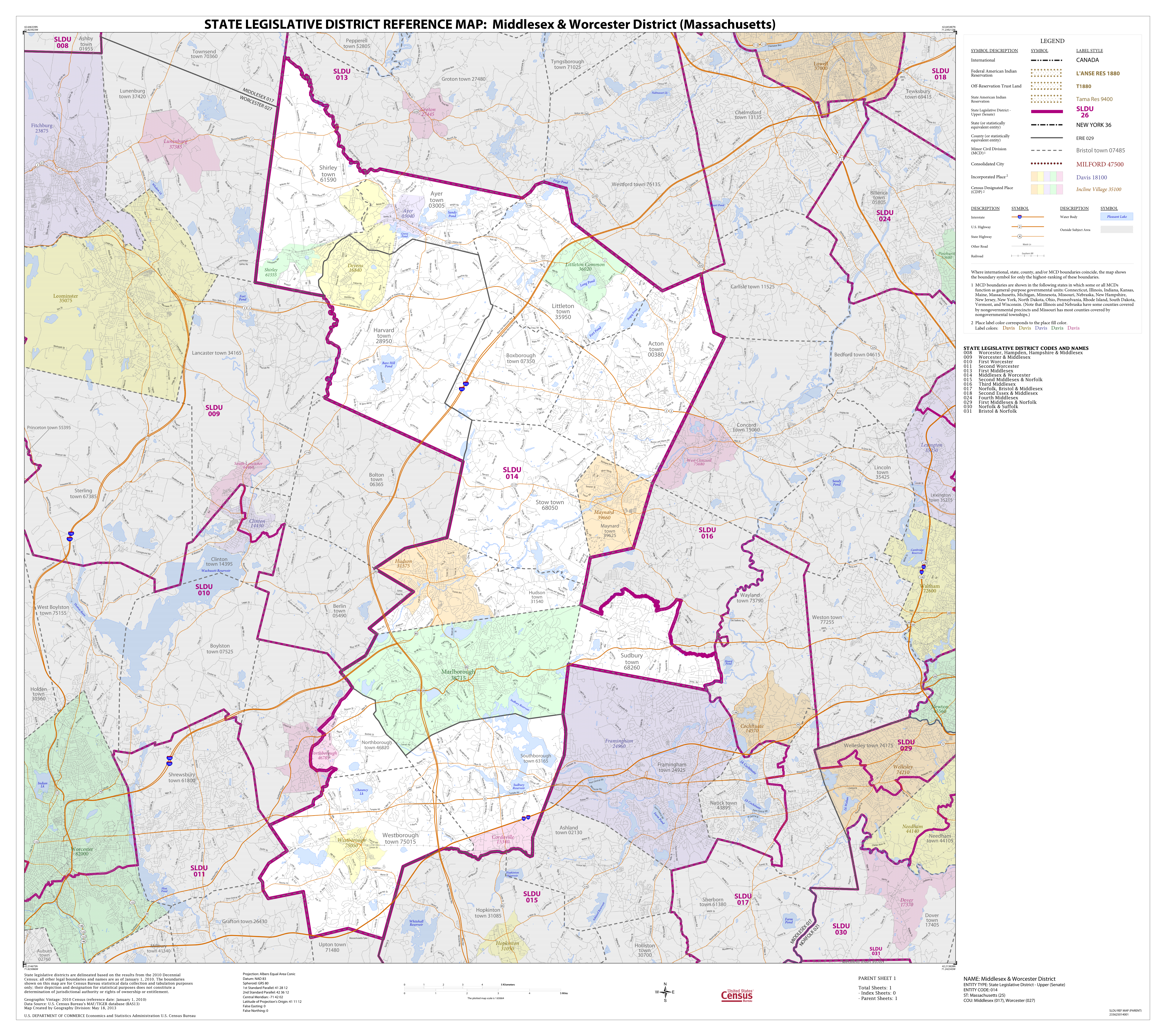
Map of Massachusetts Senate's Middlesex and Worcester district, based on the 2010 United States census.

Massachusetts Senate's Middlesex and Worcester district in the United States is one of 40 legislative districts of the Massachusetts Senate. It covers 8.8% of Middlesex County and 4.8% of Worcester County population in 2010. Democrat Jamie Eldridge of Acton has represented the district since 2009.

== Towns represented ==
The district includes the following localities:

- Acton
- Ayer
- Boxborough
- Harvard
- Hudson
- Littleton
- Marlborough
- Maynard
- Northborough
- Shirley
- Southborough
- Stow
- Sudbury
- Westborough

== Senators ==
- William I. Randall, circa 1969
- Edward Lawrence Burke, 1971-1973
- Chester G. Atkins, circa 1979
- Paul Cellucci, circa 1985
- Robert Durand, circa 1993
- Pam Resor, circa 2002
- James B. Eldridge, 2009-current

== Images ==
Portraits of legislators

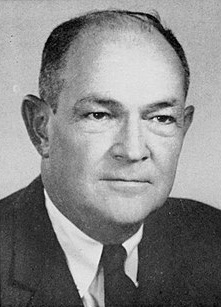
William Randall

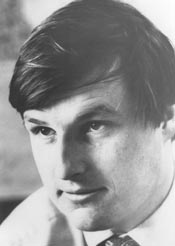
Chester Atkins

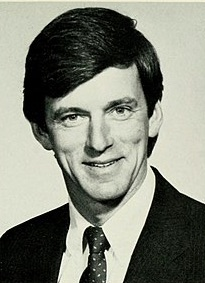
Robert Durand

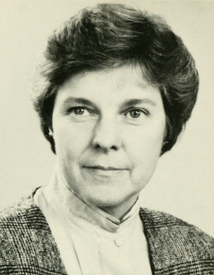
Pamela Resor

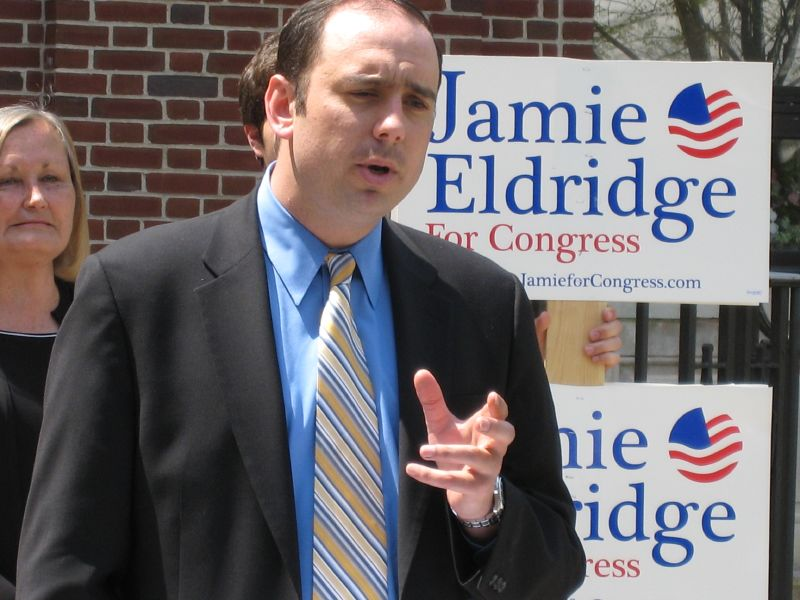
Jamie Eldridge

== See also ==
- List of Massachusetts Senate elections
- List of Massachusetts General Courts
- List of former districts of the Massachusetts Senate
- Other Worcester County districts of the Massachusett Senate: 1st, 2nd; Hampshire, Franklin and Worcester; Worcester, Hampden, Hampshire and Middlesex; Worcester and Middlesex; Worcester and Norfolk
- Middlesex County districts of the Massachusetts House of Representatives: 1st, 2nd, 3rd, 4th, 5th, 6th, 7th, 8th, 9th, 10th, 11th, 12th, 13th, 14th, 15th, 16th, 17th, 18th, 19th, 20th, 21st, 22nd, 23rd, 24th, 25th, 26th, 27th, 28th, 29th, 30th, 31st, 32nd, 33rd, 34th, 35th, 36th, 37th
- Worcester County districts of the Massachusetts House of Representatives: 1st, 2nd, 3rd, 4th, 5th, 6th, 7th, 8th, 9th, 10th, 11th, 12th, 13th, 14th, 15th, 16th, 17th, 18th
