= Wind Powering America =

Initiative of the US Department of Energy

Wind Powering America (WPA) is an initiative of the United States Department of Energy (DOE) that seeks to increase the use of wind energy throughout the United States. WPA collaborates with key state and regional stakeholders, including farmers, ranchers, Native Americans, rural electric cooperatives, consumer-owned utilities, and schools to break down barriers associated with wind energy development.

Throughout its history, WPA has focused on states with strong potential for wind energy generation but with few operational projects. WPA provides fair and unbiased information about the challenges, benefits, and impacts of wind technology implementation. This information allows policymakers, organizations, and citizens to make educated and informed decisions about wind energy implementation in their communities.

== History ==
Formed in 1999 by DOE’s Office of Energy Efficiency and Renewable Energy (EERE), WPA’s original goals were to:

- Meet 5% of the nation's energy needs with wind energy by 2020 (i.e., 80,000 megawatts [MW] installed);
- Double the number of states with more than 20 MW of wind capacity to 16 by 2005 and triple that number to 24 by 2010;
- Increase wind's contribution to federal electricity use to 5% by 2010.

Conceived as a national public-private partnership, WPA’s methodology was to work with organizations, typically state-based Wind Working Groups, and other stakeholders to provide information and direct technical assistance to support the responsible implementation of wind technologies.

This model assumed that supporting the development of an initial 20 MW of wind power capacity in a state would allow project developers and communities to work through permitting and implementation issues, providing an example for similar projects. Over time it was determined that implementing only 20 MW of wind was not sufficient to provide such examples in each state, and that 100 MW of installed capacity more accurately provided clear examples of how these projects could be successfully implemented. As increasing amounts of wind capacity were installed, new challenges, including general public acceptance, transmission constraints, and grid stability emerged, so WPA added a new threshold: 1,000 MW of wind power capacity installed in a state.

== Mission ==
Throughout its history, WPA has focused on states with strong potential for wind energy generation but with few operational projects. WPA provides fair and unbiased information about the challenges, benefits, and impacts of wind technology implementation. This information allows policymakers, organizations, and citizens to make educated and informed decisions about wind energy implementation in their communities.

According to the American Wind Energy Association, 14 states have more than 1,000 MW of wind energy installed capacity and 30 states have more than 20 MW installed. At the end of 2009, wind energy technology supplied about 2.5% of the nation’s energy.

== Initiative focus areas ==
WPA encourages further wind energy growth by working with national, regional, and state partners in communicating the benefits of wind energy to communities and industry stakeholders. WPA now works to achieve DOE’s 20% wind energy by 2030 scenario by focusing on the following areas for large land-based and offshore wind technologies, community-scale wind projects, and small and distributed wind applications:

=== State Wind Working Groups ===
In 2000, WPA helped establish the program’s first official Wind Working Group in North Dakota. Group members include landowners and agricultural sector representatives, utilities and regulators, colleges and universities, advocacy groups, and state and local officials. WPA supports Wind Working Groups by providing group members with information on the current state of wind technology, wind resources, economic development impacts, and policy options. There are 34 Wind Working Groups in the United States.

=== Regional activities ===
In 2005, WPA helped launch the New England Wind Forum to provide a Web-based, comprehensive source for up-to-date information on a wide range of wind energy development issues in the northeastern United States. The New England Wind Forum and the Great Lakes Wind Collaborative are pilots for developing expanded regionally based information support for other areas of the country.

As wind energy technology grows, WPA expects to employ a more regional focus by supporting regional organizations that will assist state organizations. Expanding the regional focus is expected to improve integration with local private and public stakeholders and strengthen collaboration between states addressing common wind energy development issues while reducing the overall need for federal funding.

=== Rural and agricultural outreach ===
Farmers, ranchers, and others in the agricultural community are looking to wind energy as a way to stabilize income and provide an additional cash crop. In addition to farmers and ranchers, WPA works with rural community leaders such as banks, economic development organizations, businesses, agriculture cooperatives and extensions, chambers of commerce, schools, and county governments to provide knowledge about the economic development potential of the wind energy sector. WPA also sends representatives to rural areas in the United States to facilitate or participate in workshops and events to disseminate accurate wind energy information to communities.

=== Wind for Schools Project ===
As wind power provides an increasing percentage of America’s energy requirements, a key challenge is the need for talented workers to support the industry. WPA’s Wind for Schools project is an education and outreach effort that recruits and provides training for wind technicians, engineers, scientists, and other workers who will meet the growing needs of the wind industry. WPA engages universities, rural schools, and communities in wind energy education through the installation of small wind turbines at K-12 schools. The project has four objectives:

- Educate college students in wind energy applications, which will equip engineers for the growing U.S. wind industry.
- Engage K-12 teachers and students in wind energy, sparking the interest of the next generation to enter science, engineering, and energy fields.
- Introduce wind energy to rural communities, initiating a discussion of wind energy’s benefits and challenges.
- Establish state Wind Application Centers to provide technical support and information on the appropriate application of wind technologies.

Established in 2006 using Colorado as the pilot state, Wind for Schools now has 11 states working toward educating future generations about wind energy. WPA also supports states or schools interested in implementing similar projects through a defined affiliate program.

Wind for Schools establishes Wind Application Centers at universities in target states that support the development of wind energy classes and degree programs. The program provides opportunities for university students to install small wind turbines at elementary and secondary schools. Host schools incorporate wind energy topics, including math and engineering, into the curriculum. Supported by local businesses and utilities, small wind turbines at rural schools also introduce the concept of energy and the need for national strategic thinking on energy issues to the communities that participate in the program.

=== Anemometer loan program ===
To help states and Native American communities understand their wind resources, WPA created an anemometer loan program. Participants borrow anemometers and installation equipment to measure wind resources. Anemometer data can be used to help businesses, developers, farmers, ranchers, and homeowners determine wind potential in selected areas. Each anemometer collects wind speed data in 10-minute intervals. The data aid wind farm developers in determining whether an area is suitable for developing a large-scale installation.

=== Support for Native Americans ===
There are more than 700 Native American tribes and Native Alaskan villages and corporations. WPA supports the development of wind resources on native lands by providing a wide range of technical assistance and outreach activities. In addition to the anemometer loan program, WPA provides pre-feasibility studies and wind energy training through the DOE-supported Wind Energy Applications and Training Symposium (WEATS). WPA’s Native American program is becoming part of DOE’s Tribal Energy Program.

=== Economic and workforce development ===
In 2004, WPA helped develop the Jobs and Economic Development Impacts (JEDI) model to analyze the costs and benefits of new wind energy projects. WPA also published case studies about the economic impact of wind farms in rural communities. The studies provide insight into the type of information that is gathered in undertaking an economic impact study, what kind of information is most helpful in promoting wind energy development in rural communities, and the limitations on collecting data for the studies. The studies are available on WPA’s website.

WPA has also conducted extensive activities to address workforce development, including producing a wind workforce roadmap, conducting technology-specific training, supporting the identification of job classification to aid the wind industry, and developing wind energy curricula at all academic levels.

=== Public lands ===
WPA assists the Bureau of Land Management, the U.S. Coast Guard, Army National Guard, and other entities in evaluating wind energy development on public lands. The program also provides outreach and educational services and supports federal and state mandates for the expanded use of clean, renewable energy technologies.

=== Wind resource maps ===
WPA supports a collaborative effort between the National Renewable Energy Laboratory and AWS Truepower to update the map of U.S. wind energy potential. New wind energy resource maps with potential estimates at 80 meters and 100 meters were recently completed, and a 30-meter map focusing on small and community wind will soon follow. These products support understanding of wind energy potential at the local, state, and national levels.

=== Wind technology technical support ===
Wind technologies can be used in many applications, including land-based and offshore utility-scale wind farms, community-scale projects, and distributed applications for homes and businesses. WPA provides information on wind energy issues to stakeholders in each of these sectors. WPA produces application-specific information, including a series of small wind consumer’s guides and other outreach materials.

=== Website, resources, and tools ===
The WPA website provides multiple resources pertaining to wind energy development in the United States, including wind maps, the JEDI model, consumer’s guides, wind energy videos, podcasts and audio files, publications, news, wind-related events, and past events involving WPA.

=== Funding and implementation ===
WPA is managed and supported by DOE’s Wind and Water Power Program with primary strategic and implementation support by the National Renewable Energy Laboratory and DOE’s Golden Field Office staff. Work is also supported by state energy offices, energy industry participants, universities, and non-government organizations.

== See also ==
- Wind power in the United States
- Renewable energy in the United States
- List of wind farms in the United States
