= Robert Durand =

American politician (born 1953)

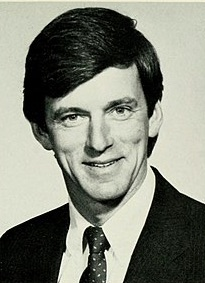
- Robert Durand, circa 1991

Massachusetts Secretary of Environmental Affairs
- In office 1999–2003
- Governor: Paul Cellucci; Jane M. Swift
- Preceded by: Trudy Coxe
- Succeeded by: Ellen Roy Herzfelder

Member of the Massachusetts Senate from the Middlesex and Worcester District
- In office 1991–1999
- Preceded by: Paul Cellucci
- Succeeded by: Pam Resor

Member of the Massachusetts House of Representatives from the 4th Middlesex District
- In office 1985–1991
- Preceded by: Joseph Navin
- Succeeded by: Daniel J. Valianti

Personal details
- Born: February 28, 1953 (age 73) Marlborough, Massachusetts
- Party: Democratic
- Education: Boston College
- Occupation: Politician

Robert A. Durand (born February 28, 1953, in Marlborough, Massachusetts) is an American politician who served as the Secretary of Environmental Affairs in the Commonwealth of Massachusetts from 1999 to 2003.

== Career ==
Prior to becoming Secretary of Environmental Affairs, Durand represented the Middlesex and Worcester District in the Massachusetts Senate (1991–99) and the 4th Middlesex district in the Massachusetts House of Representatives from (1985–91).
