= Norfolk Street =

Norfolk Street may refer to:

- Norfolk Street, Fremantle, Australia
- Norfolk Street, Strand, London, UK
- Norfolk Street station, Newark, New Jersey, US
- Norfolk Street Historic District, Cambridge, Massachusetts, US
