= Ivory Sands House =

Historic house in Massachusetts, United States

- U.S. National Register of Historic Places
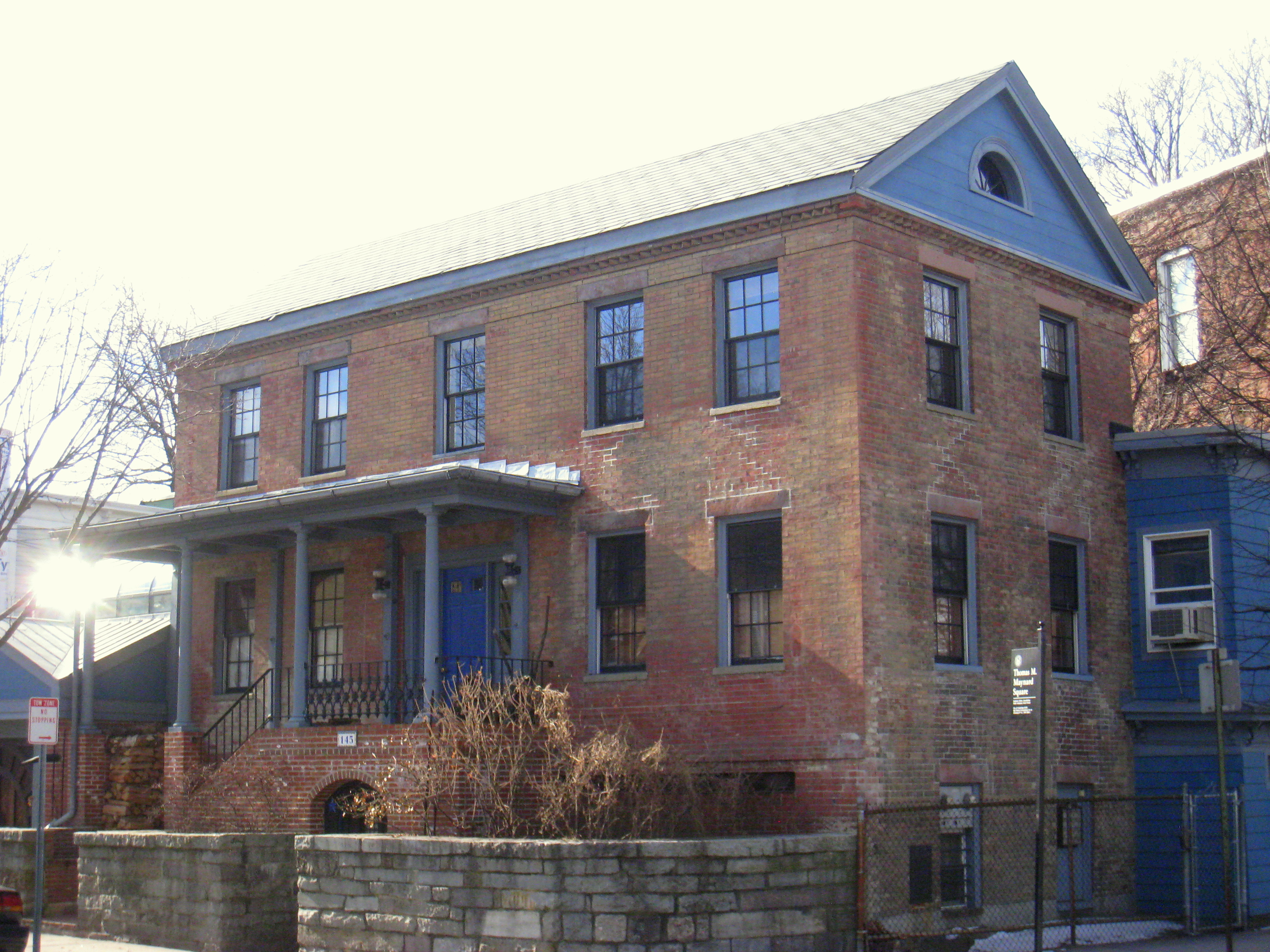

- Location within Massachusetts Location within the United States
- Location: 145 Elm Street, Cambridge, Massachusetts
- Coordinates: 42°22′13.6″N 71°05′49.3″W
- Built: 1839
- Architectural style: Greek Revival, Federal
- MPS: Cambridge MRA
- NRHP reference No.: 82001976
- Added to NRHP: April 13, 1982

The Ivory Sands House is a historic house in Cambridge, Massachusetts. It is a two-story brick structure, five bays wide, with a side-gable roof. It was built in 1839, and has transitional Federal-Greek Revival styling. It was the first of four brick houses built by a local family of brickmakers, and is one of the few surviving Federal period brick houses in the city. The Sands family were involved in Cambridge's brickmaking businesses for most of the 19th century.

The house was listed on the National Register of Historic Places in 1982.

== See also ==
- Hiram Sands House
- National Register of Historic Places listings in Cambridge, Massachusetts
