= Union Railway Car Barn =

- U.S. National Register of Historic Places
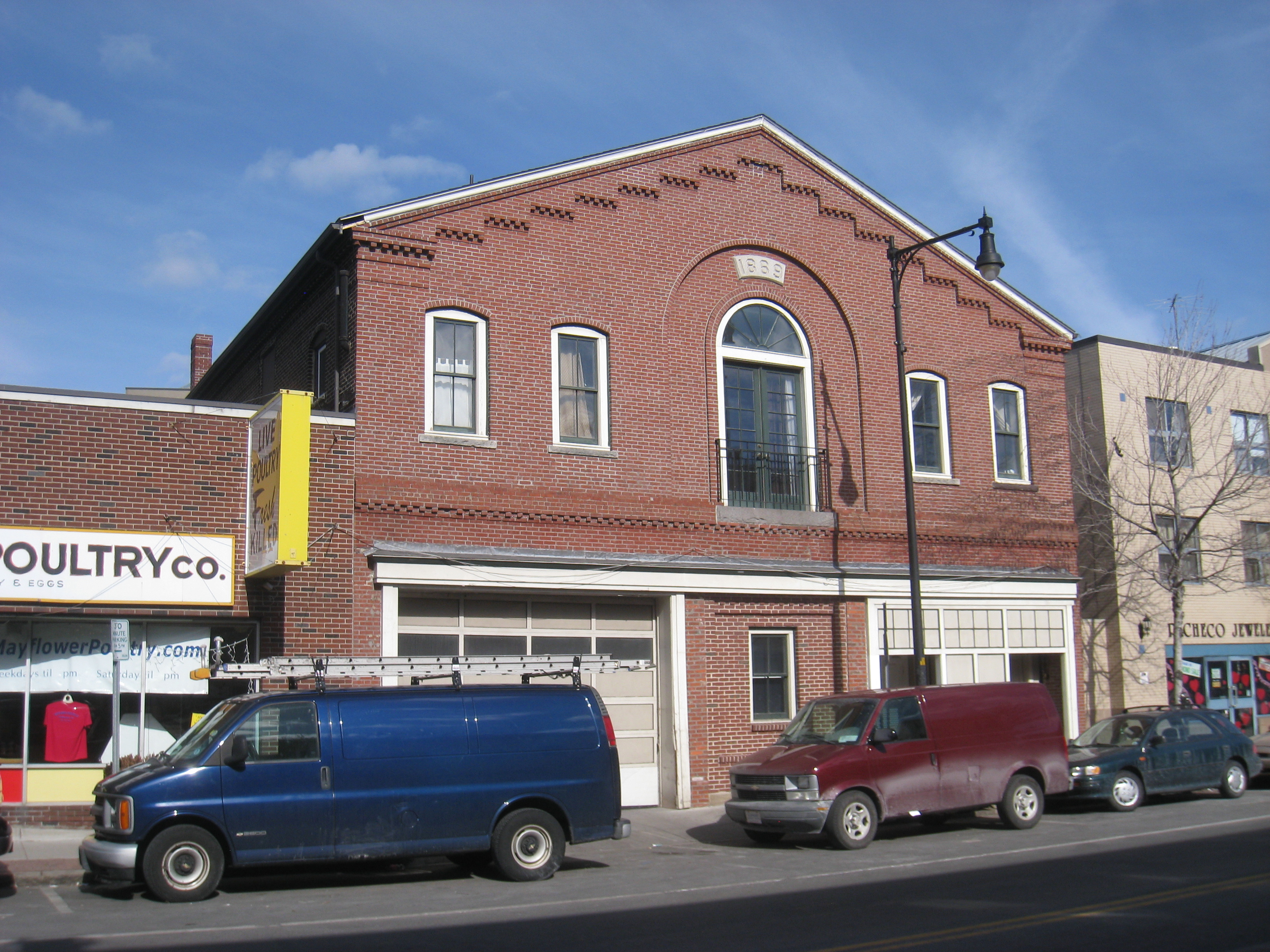

- Location within Massachusetts Location within the United States
- Location: 613–621 Cambridge Street, Cambridge, Massachusetts
- Coordinates: 42°22′19.4″N 71°05′11.1″W
- Built: 1869
- Architectural style: Greek Revival
- MPS: Cambridge MRA
- NRHP reference No.: 82001980
- Added to NRHP: April 13, 1982

The Union Railway Car Barn is an historic building in Cambridge, Massachusetts. It is a large brick 2 1/2-story building, with a distinctive round-arch central window and a stepped brick cornice. Its ground floor has been converted to a retail storefront. It was built in 1869 to house the horse-drawn streetcars of the Union Railway Company, founded in 1855. It is the only surviving car barn of three built by the company in Cambridge, and a rare surviving element of the city's 19th-century transportation infrastructure.

The building was listed on the National Register of Historic Places in 1982.

== See also ==
- National Register of Historic Places listings in Cambridge, Massachusetts
