= John Wyeth House =

Historic house in Massachusetts, United States

- U.S. National Register of Historic Places
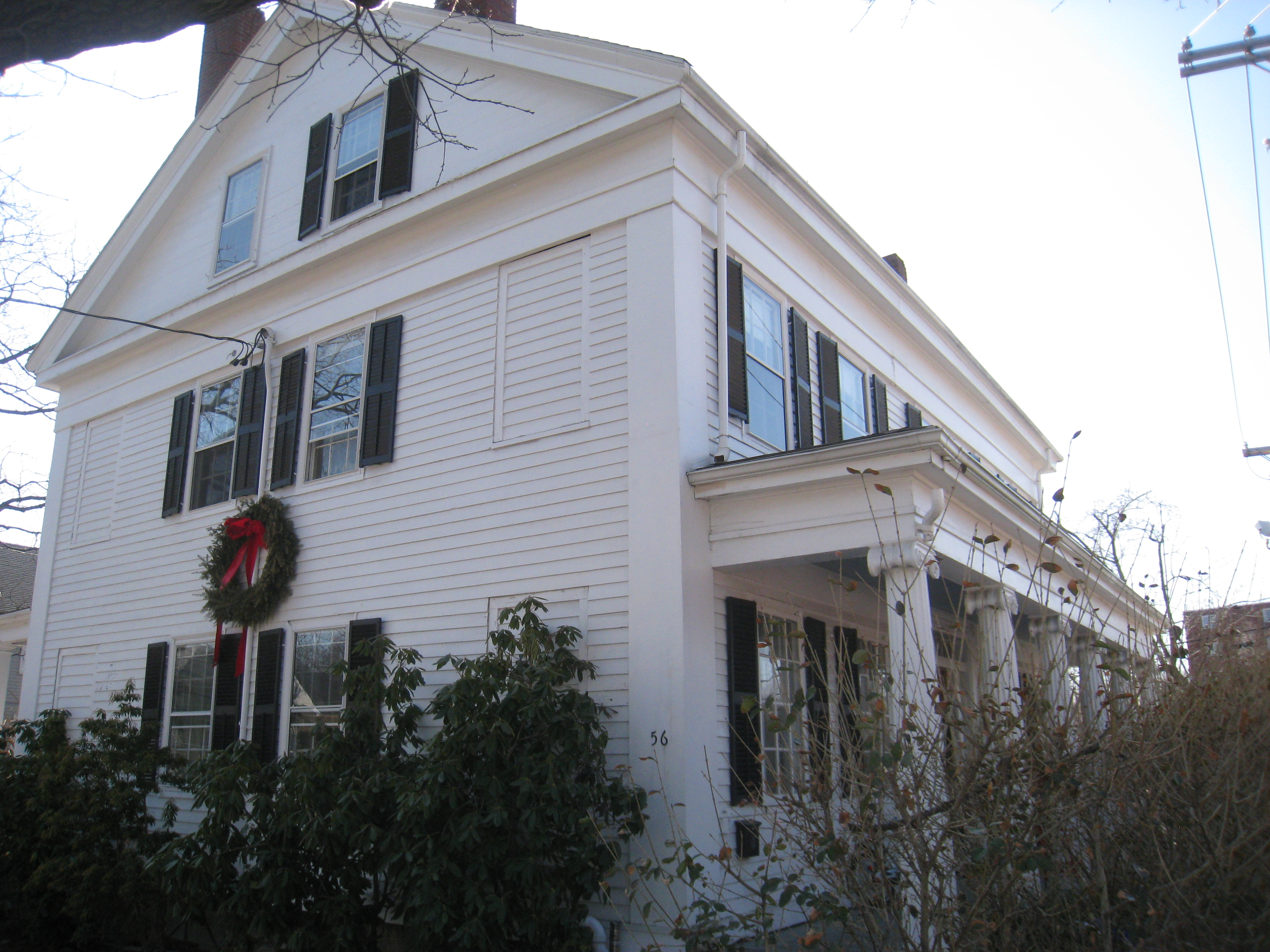

- Location within Massachusetts
- Location: 56 Aberdeen Avenue, Cambridge, Massachusetts
- Coordinates: 42°22′36.1″N 71°08′48.5″W
- Built: 1841
- Architectural style: Greek Revival
- MPS: Cambridge MRA
- NRHP reference No.: 82001988
- Added to NRHP: April 13, 1982

The John Wyeth House is a historic house in Cambridge, Massachusetts.

== Description ==
It is a 2 1/2-story wood-frame structure, with a side-gable roof and two irregularly-placed chimneys. A porch extends across the front, supported by fluted Ionic columns. It was built in 1841, and originally stood across the street from the gate of Mount Auburn Cemetery. It was moved to its present location in 1922–23; it is one of the oldest Greek Revival houses in Northwest Cambridge.

The house was listed on the National Register of Historic Places on April 13, 1982.

== See also ==
- National Register of Historic Places listings in Cambridge, Massachusetts
