= Winter Street Historic District =

Historic district in Massachusetts, United States

- U.S. National Register of Historic Places
- U.S. Historic district
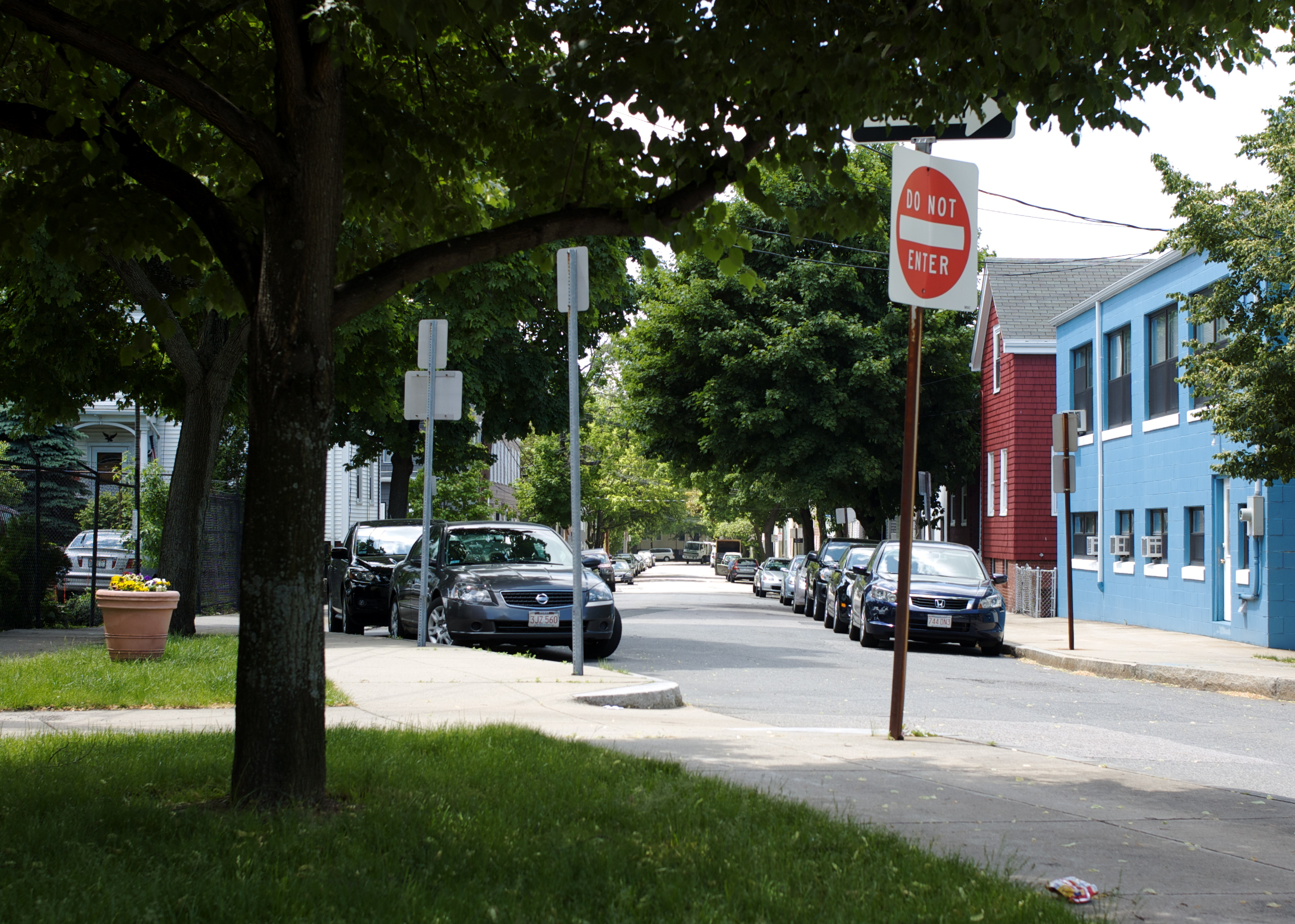

- Location within Massachusetts Location within the United States
- Location: Cambridge, Massachusetts
- Coordinates: 42°22′22″N 71°4′54″W
- Built: 1873
- Architectural style: Georgian
- MPS: Cambridge MRA
- NRHP reference No.: 82001986
- Added to NRHP: April 13, 1982

The Winter Street Historic District is a historic district on Winter Street in Cambridge, Massachusetts. Centered on the junction of Winter Street with Sciarappa Street, the district includes sixteen houses, fourteen of which were worker's cottages built before 1854. Many early residents of the area were employed by the New England Glass Company, whose factory was nearby. The district is the best-preserved streetscape of such worker housing in East Cambridge.

The district was listed on the National Register of Historic Places in 1982.

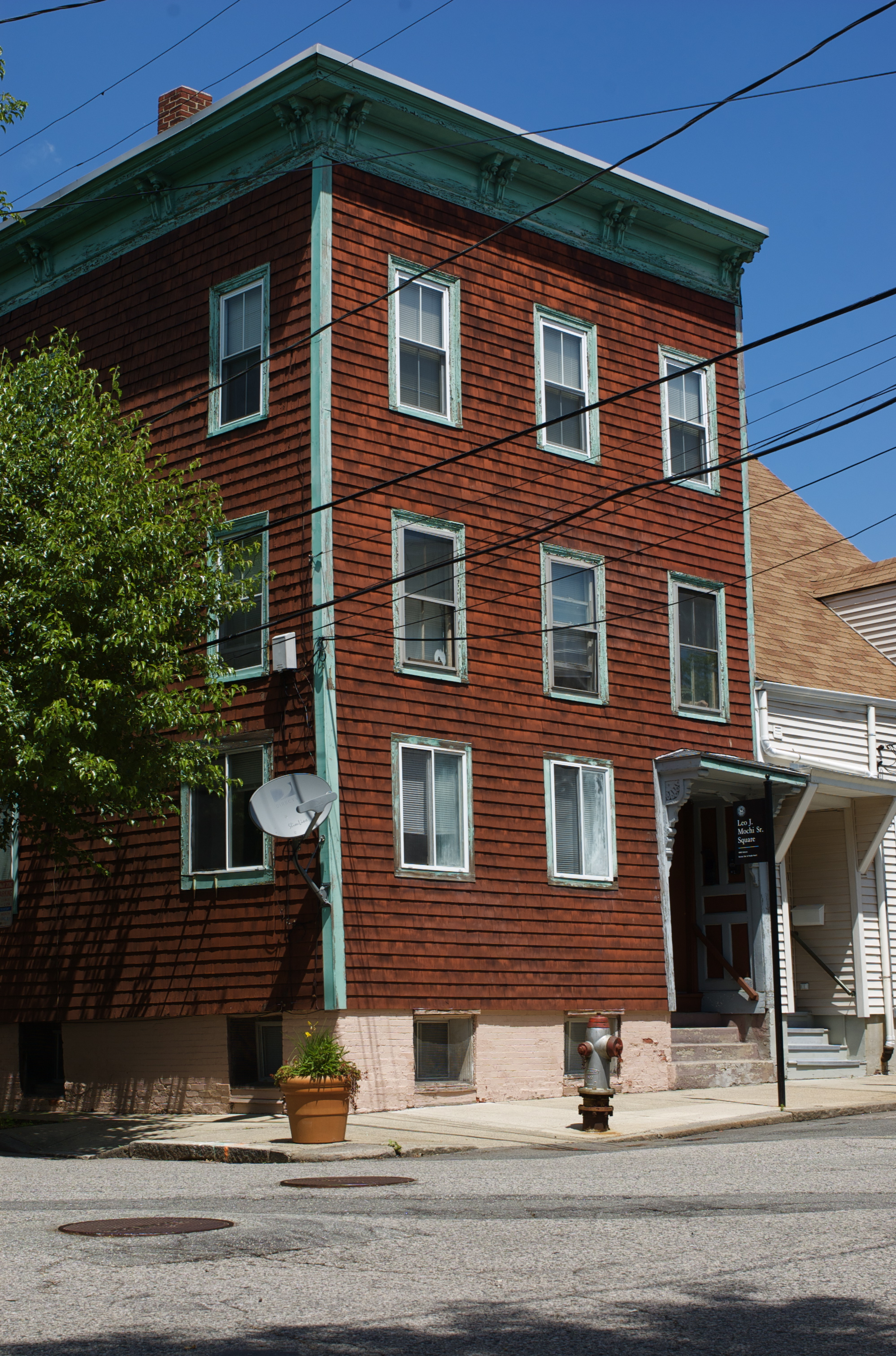
A house on Winter Street in the historic district.

== See also ==
- National Register of Historic Places listings in Cambridge, Massachusetts
