= Edmund Reardon House =

Historic house in Massachusetts, United States

- U.S. National Register of Historic Places
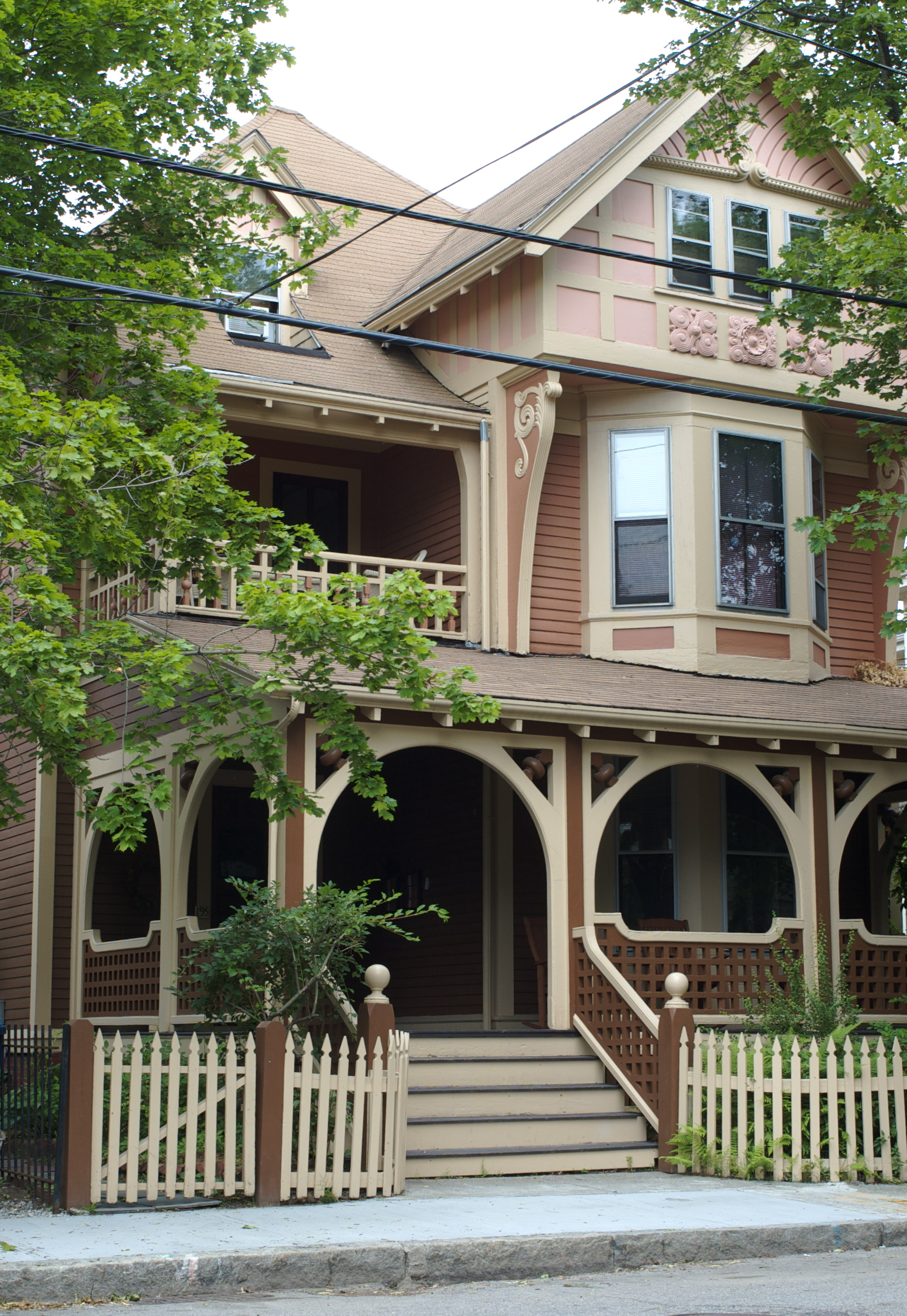

- Location within Massachusetts Location within the United States
- Location: 195 Erie Street, Cambridge, Massachusetts
- Coordinates: 42°21′37.3″N 71°06′28.1″W
- Built: 1884
- Architectural style: Queen Anne
- MPS: Cambridge MRA
- NRHP reference No.: 82001972
- Added to NRHP: April 13, 1982

The Edmund Reardon House is a historic house in Cambridge, Massachusetts. The 2.5-story Queen Anne house was built in 1884 for Edmund Reardon, whose family operated a nearby soap factory. The house has elaborately decorated porches and half-timbering in various gable ends.

The house was listed on the National Register of Historic Places in 1982.

== Edmund Reardon ==
On Tuesday, October 24, 1939, Edmund Reardon, the oldest active banker in the country, died at 102 years of age in his home in Cambridge, Massachusetts. He was a vice president and a director of the Union Savings Bank. He also active in Cambridge city politics, serving as alderman and councilor.

== See also ==
- National Register of Historic Places listings in Cambridge, Massachusetts
