= Homer-Lovell House =

Historic house in Massachusetts, United States

- U.S. National Register of Historic Places
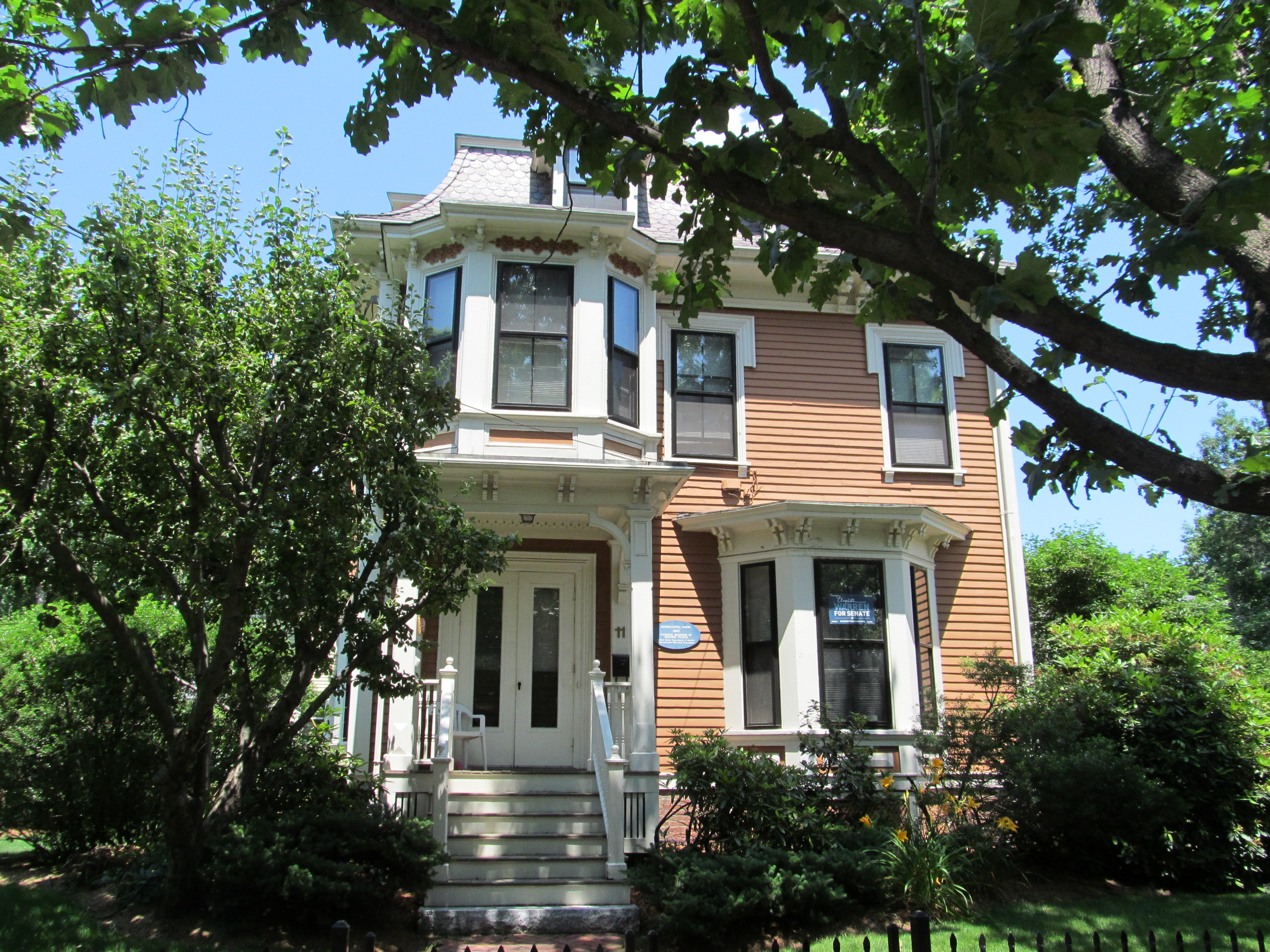
- Homer-Lovell House

- Location within Massachusetts Location within the United States
- Location: Cambridge, Massachusetts
- Coordinates: 42°23′7.7″N 71°7′3.9″W
- Built: 1867
- Architectural style: Second Empire
- MPS: Cambridge MRA
- NRHP reference No.: 83004030
- Added to NRHP: December 22, 1983

The Homer-Lovell House is an historic house at 11 Forest Street, just outside Porter Square in Cambridge, Massachusetts. The two story wood-frame house was built in two sections: the main block, a fine Second Empire house, was built in 1867, when the Porter Square area was growing as a residential area because of its train station. In the 1920s the house was extended to the rear and converted into a two-family. Many houses in the area underwent this sort of conversion, most losing their historical integrity. The main block has well-preserved Second Empire features, including extended eaves with brackets, and heavily decorated front portico and projecting bay window.

The house was listed on the National Register of Historic Places in 1983.

== See also ==
- National Register of Historic Places listings in Cambridge, Massachusetts
