= William F. Bradbury House =

Historic house in Massachusetts, United States

- U.S. National Register of Historic Places
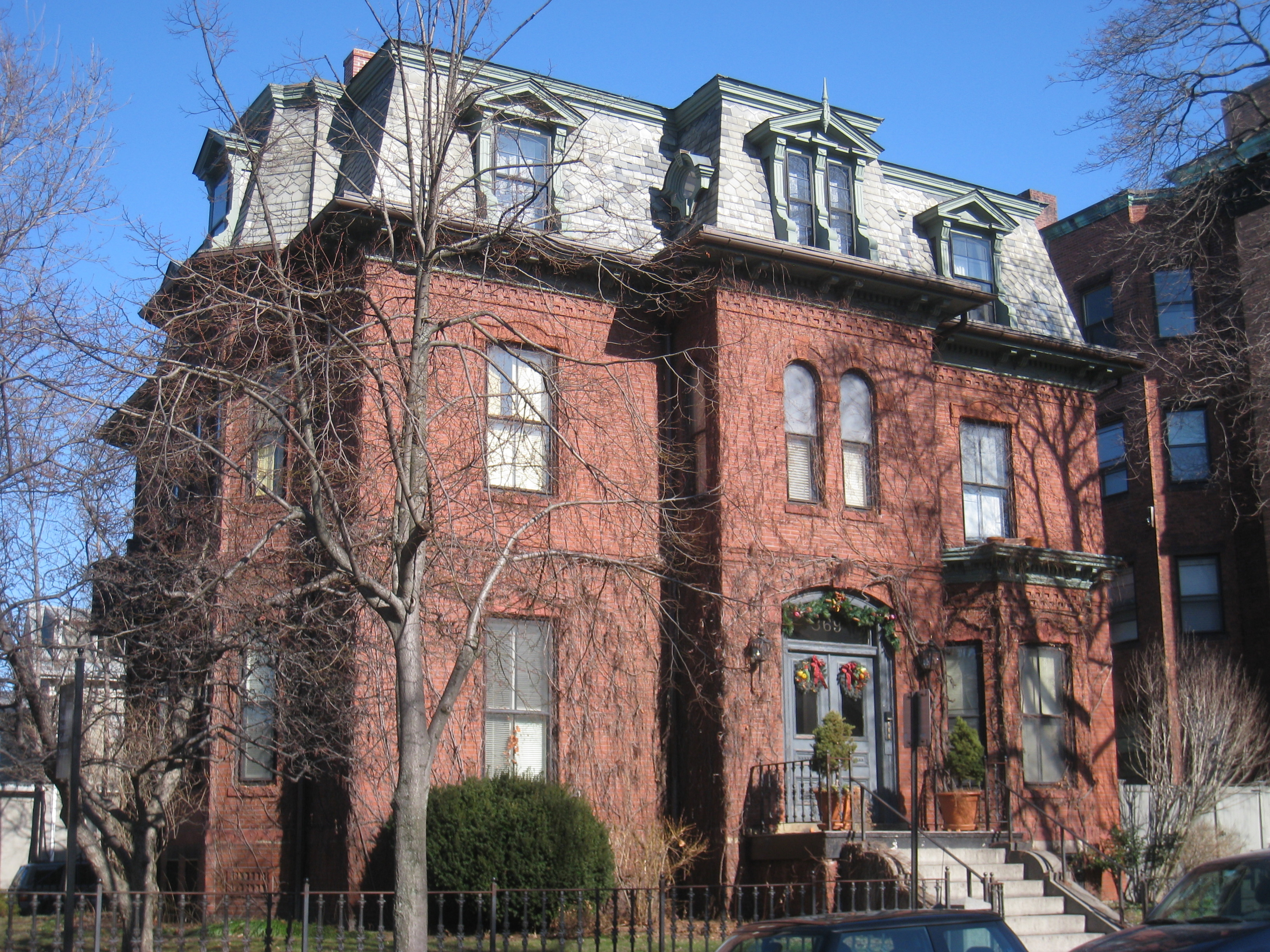

- Location within Massachusetts Location within the United States
- Location: Cambridge, Massachusetts
- Coordinates: 42°22′17.6″N 71°06′42.0″W
- Built: 1877
- Architectural style: Second Empire
- MPS: Cambridge MRA
- NRHP reference No.: 83000784
- Added to NRHP: June 30, 1983

The William F. Bradbury House is an historic house at 369 Harvard Street in Cambridge, Massachusetts. The three-story brick Second Empire house was built in 1877 by William F. Bradbury, head master of the Cambridge Latin School. The pressed brick construction was rare for Cambridge at the time, and the house is now one of the few single family houses of the period to remain on Harvard Street, which was once lined by single-family houses.

The house was listed on the National Register of Historic Places in 1983.

== See also ==
- National Register of Historic Places listings in Cambridge, Massachusetts
