= Albert Vinal House =

Historic house in Massachusetts, United States

- U.S. National Register of Historic Places
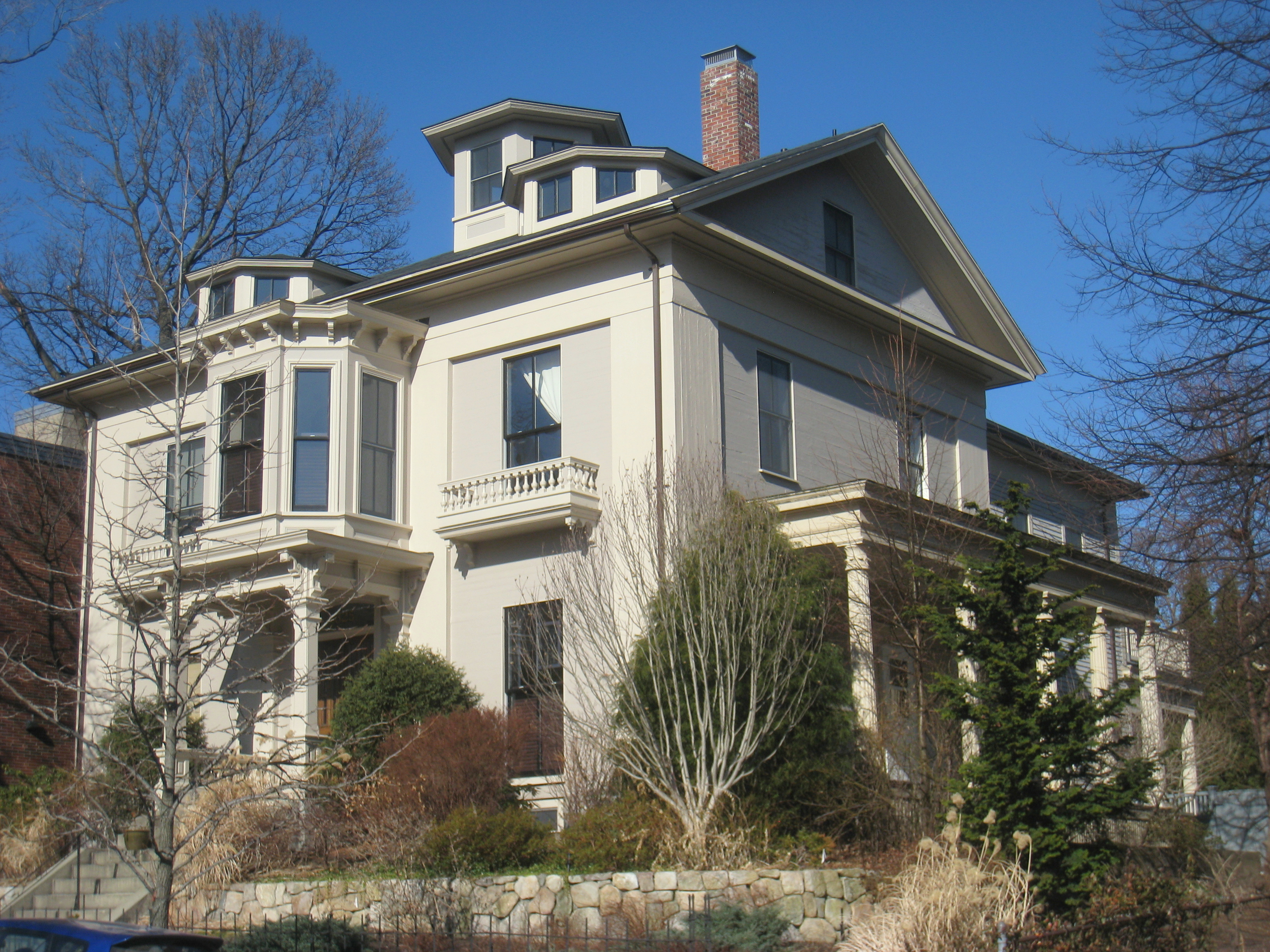

- Location within Massachusetts Location within the United States
- Location: Cambridge, Massachusetts
- Coordinates: 42°22′13.9″N 71°06′27.9″W
- Built: 1853
- Architectural style: Greek Revival
- MPS: Cambridge MRA
- NRHP reference No.: 83000834
- Added to NRHP: June 30, 1983

The Albert Vinal House is a historic house located at 325 Harvard Street in Cambridge, Massachusetts.

== Description and history ==
The substantial Greek Revival house was built in 1853–1854 by Albert Vinal, a real estate developer and a dealer in lumber, wood, and coal. In addition to a fully pedimented gable, the house has wide corner pilasters, and several porches and porticos. The main entrance portico is particularly elaborate, and is topped by a bay window with an Italianate extended cornice with brackets.

The house was listed on the National Register of Historic Places on June 30, 1983.

== See also ==
- National Register of Historic Places listings in Cambridge, Massachusetts
