= Building at 42 Edward J. Lopez Avenue =

Historic house in Massachusetts, United States

- U.S. National Register of Historic Places
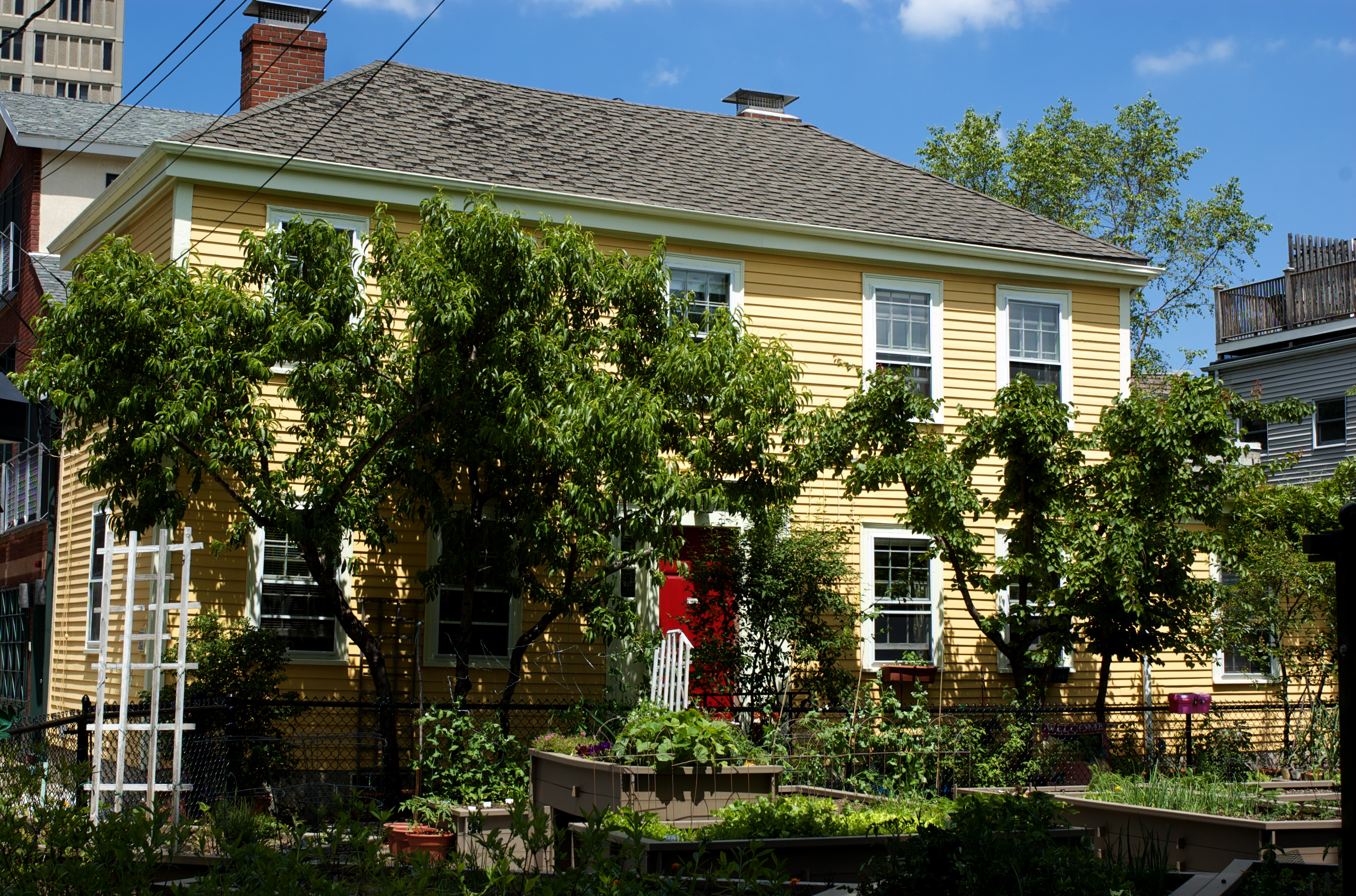

- Location within Massachusetts Location within the United States
- Location: 42 Edward J. Lopez Ave., Cambridge, Massachusetts
- Coordinates: 42°22′04.1″N 71°04′47.4″W
- Built: 1830
- Architectural style: Georgian, Federal
- MPS: Cambridge MRA
- NRHP reference No.: 82001928
- Added to NRHP: April 13, 1982

The building at 42 Edward J. Lopez Avenue is a rare Federal period house in East Cambridge, Massachusetts. The two story wood-frame building has a hip roof and very simple styling. It was built about 1830, during the first period of East Cambridge's development after construction of the West Boston Bridge, and was moved to its present location c. 1900, probably as part of construction work in the area. The nature of the terrain in the area at that time means it cannot have been moved very far.

The house was listed on the National Register of Historic Places in 1982.

== See also ==
- National Register of Historic Places listings in Cambridge, Massachusetts
