= E. H. Brabrook House =

Historic house in Massachusetts, United States

- U.S. National Register of Historic Places
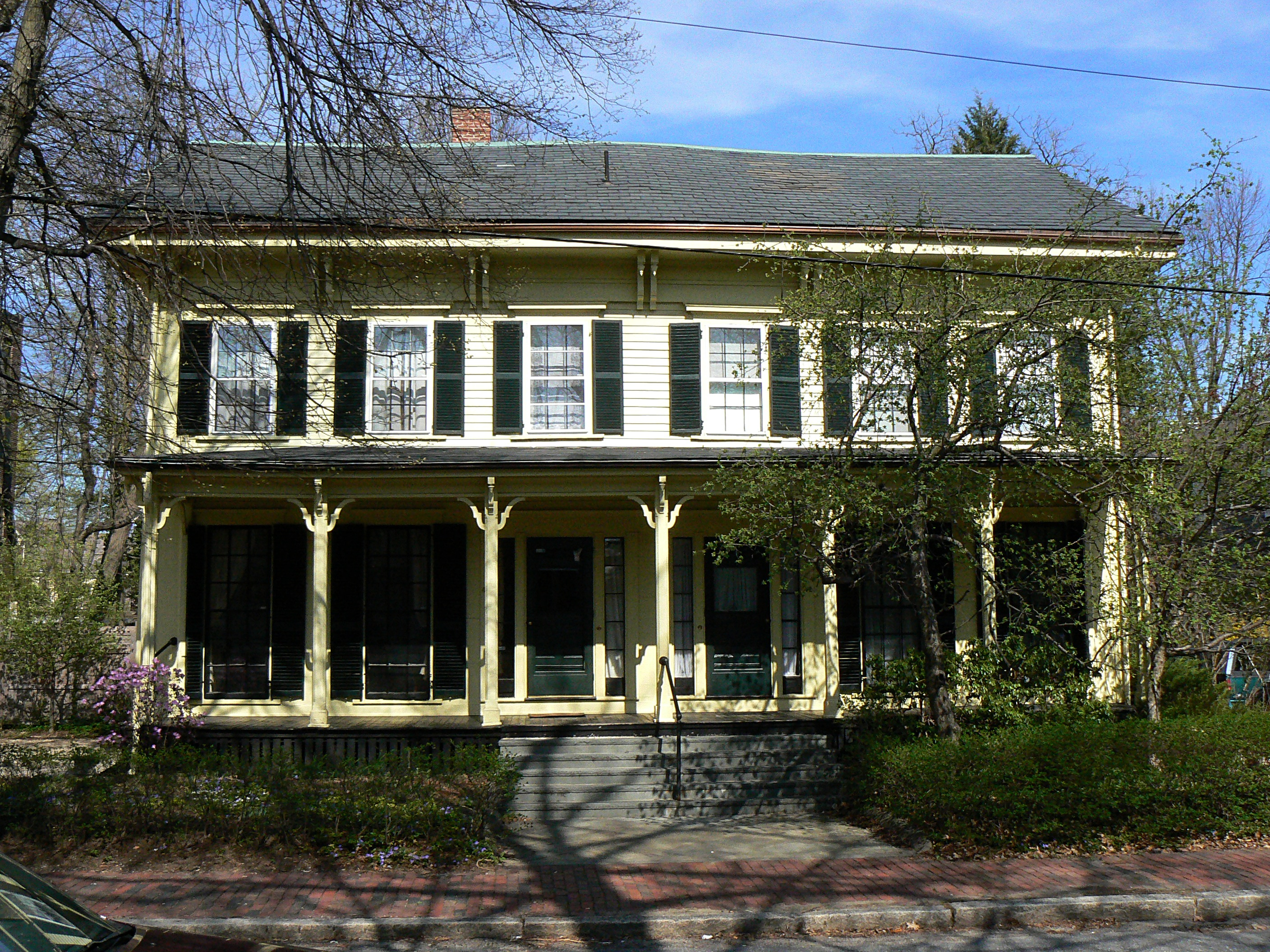

- Location within Massachusetts Location within the United States
- Location: 42–44 Avon Street, Cambridge, Massachusetts
- Coordinates: 42°22′59″N 42°22′59″E
- Built: 1849
- Architectural style: Greek Revival, Italianate
- MPS: Cambridge MRA
- NRHP reference No.: 86001276
- Added to NRHP: May 19, 1986

The E. H. Brabrook House is an historic duplex house in Cambridge, Massachusetts. It is a two-story wood-frame structure, six bays wide, with a side gable roof and a porch extending across its front facade. It was built in 1849 by Ezra Brabrook, a local furniture dealer. It is one of the first Italianate houses in Old Cambridge, retaining distinctive Greek Revival characteristics such as its corner pilasters and front door sidelight windows, while including an Italianate wide cornice and brackets.

The house was listed on the National Register of Historic Places in 1986.

== See also ==
- National Register of Historic Places listings in Cambridge, Massachusetts
