= Kirkland Place Historic District =

Historic district in Massachusetts, United States

- U.S. National Register of Historic Places
- U.S. Historic district
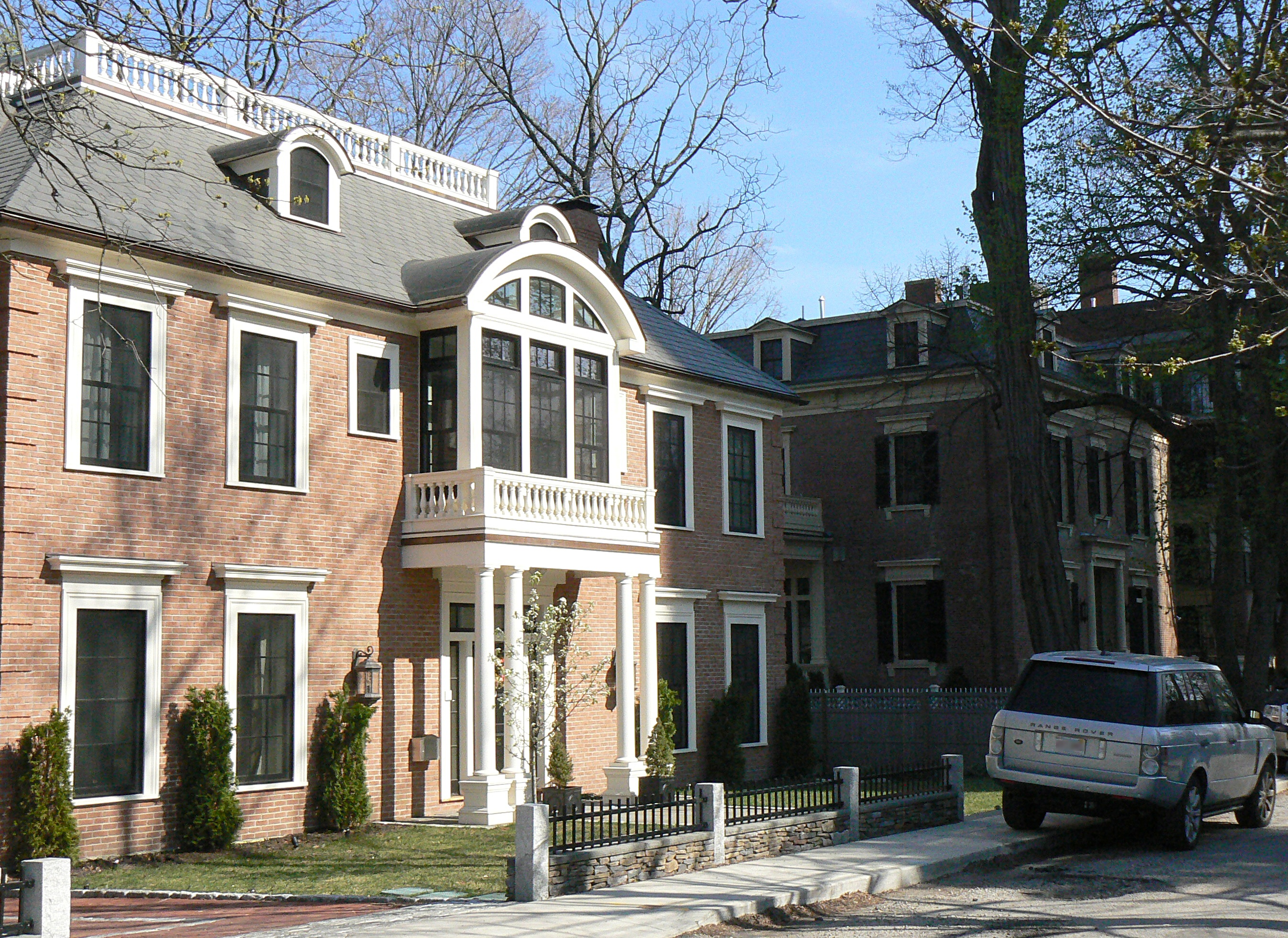
- Houses on Kirkland Place

- Location within Massachusetts Location within the United States
- Location: Cambridge, Massachusetts
- Coordinates: 42°22′41″N 71°6′51″W
- Built: 1839
- Architect: Isaac Cutler
- Architectural style: Greek Revival, Italianate
- MPS: Cambridge MRA
- NRHP reference No.: 86001683
- Added to NRHP: May 19, 1986

The Kirkland Place Historic District is a historic district in Cambridge, Massachusetts. The district, which abuts the Harvard University campus to the west, contains an architecturally cohesive and distinctive set of seven houses, six of which were completed before 1857. Four houses were designed by Isaac Cutler, who laid out Kirkland Place in 1855. To make way for these four houses, Cutler moved an 1839 Greek Revival house, now 14 Kirkland Place, to the back of its lot. Cutler's houses (numbers 9, 10, 12, and 13) are all Italianate houses with brackets. The Loring-Pierce House at 4 Kirkland Place is an 1856 Second Empire house designed by local architect Horace Greenough, and is the only one of his designs to survive in the city. The seventh house, a brick house built in 1921 to a design by Ernest Seavern, is small and set back, not intruding on its older neighbors.

The district was listed on the National Register of Historic Places in 1986.

== See also ==
- National Register of Historic Places listings in Cambridge, Massachusetts
