= Lawrence Soule House =

Historic house in Massachusetts, United States

- U.S. National Register of Historic Places
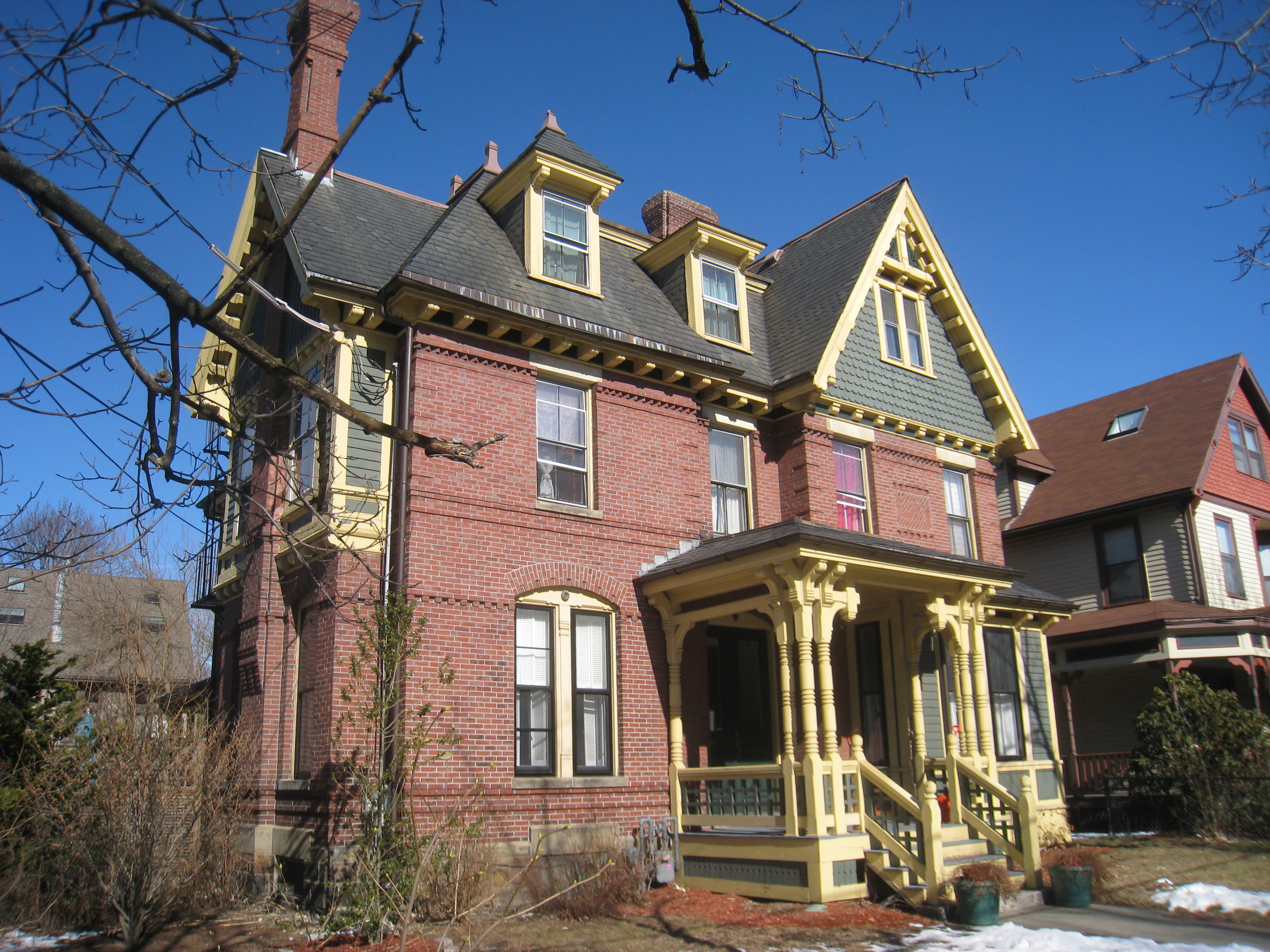

- Location within Massachusetts Location within the United States
- Location: Cambridge, Massachusetts
- Coordinates: 42°23′32.95″N 71°7′23.55″W
- Built: 1879
- Architect: Ware & Van Brunt; Howe, Frank Maynard
- Architectural style: Queen Anne
- MPS: Cambridge MRA
- NRHP reference No.: 82001978
- Added to NRHP: April 13, 1982

The Lawrence Soule House is an historic house at 11 Russell Street in Cambridge, Massachusetts. It is a 2 1/2-story brick building, with asymmetrical massing typical of the Queen Anne period. Surface texture is varied by different types of brick patterning, and there are a variety of gables, projections, and irregularly placed chimneys. It was built in 1879 for Lawrence Porter Soule to a design by Frank Maynard Howe, an apprentice at the firm of Ware & Van Brunt. The building received immediate notice in the architectural press, and is a rare architect-designed house in North Cambridge.

The house was listed on the National Register of Historic Places in 1982.

== See also ==
- National Register of Historic Places listings in Cambridge, Massachusetts
