= Sara Foster Colburn House =

Historic house in Massachusetts, United States

- U.S. National Register of Historic Places
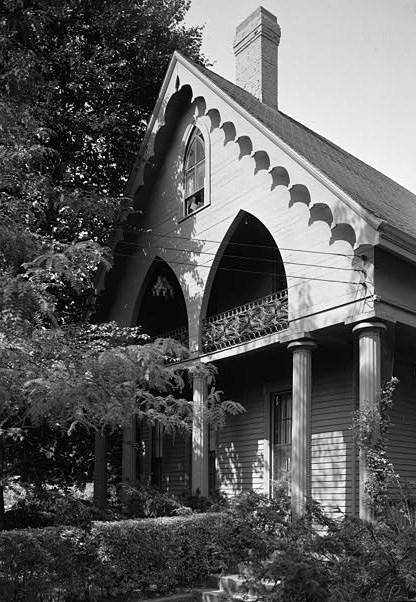
- Sara Coburn House in 1964

- Location within Massachusetts Location within the United States
- Location: Cambridge, Massachusetts
- Coordinates: 42°22′12.2″N 71°06′37.2″W
- Built: 1846
- Architect: Virgin, Nathaniel
- Architectural style: Gothic Revival
- MPS: Cambridge MRA
- NRHP reference No.: 82004968
- Added to NRHP: April 13, 1982

The Sara Foster Colburn House is an historic house at 7 Dana Street in Cambridge, Massachusetts. Built in 1846, the 1 1/2-story wood-frame house is the best example of Gothic Revival architecture in the city. The building has bargeboard decoration on its front gable, which frames a deeply recessed porch with Gothic-style openings and a distinctive wrought iron railing of a type typically found only in the Connecticut River valley.

The house was listed on the National Register of Historic Places in 1982.

== See also ==
- National Register of Historic Places listings in Cambridge, Massachusetts
