= Buildings at 15–17 Lee Street =

Historic house in Massachusetts, United States

- Buildings at 15–17 Lee St.
- U.S. National Register of Historic Places
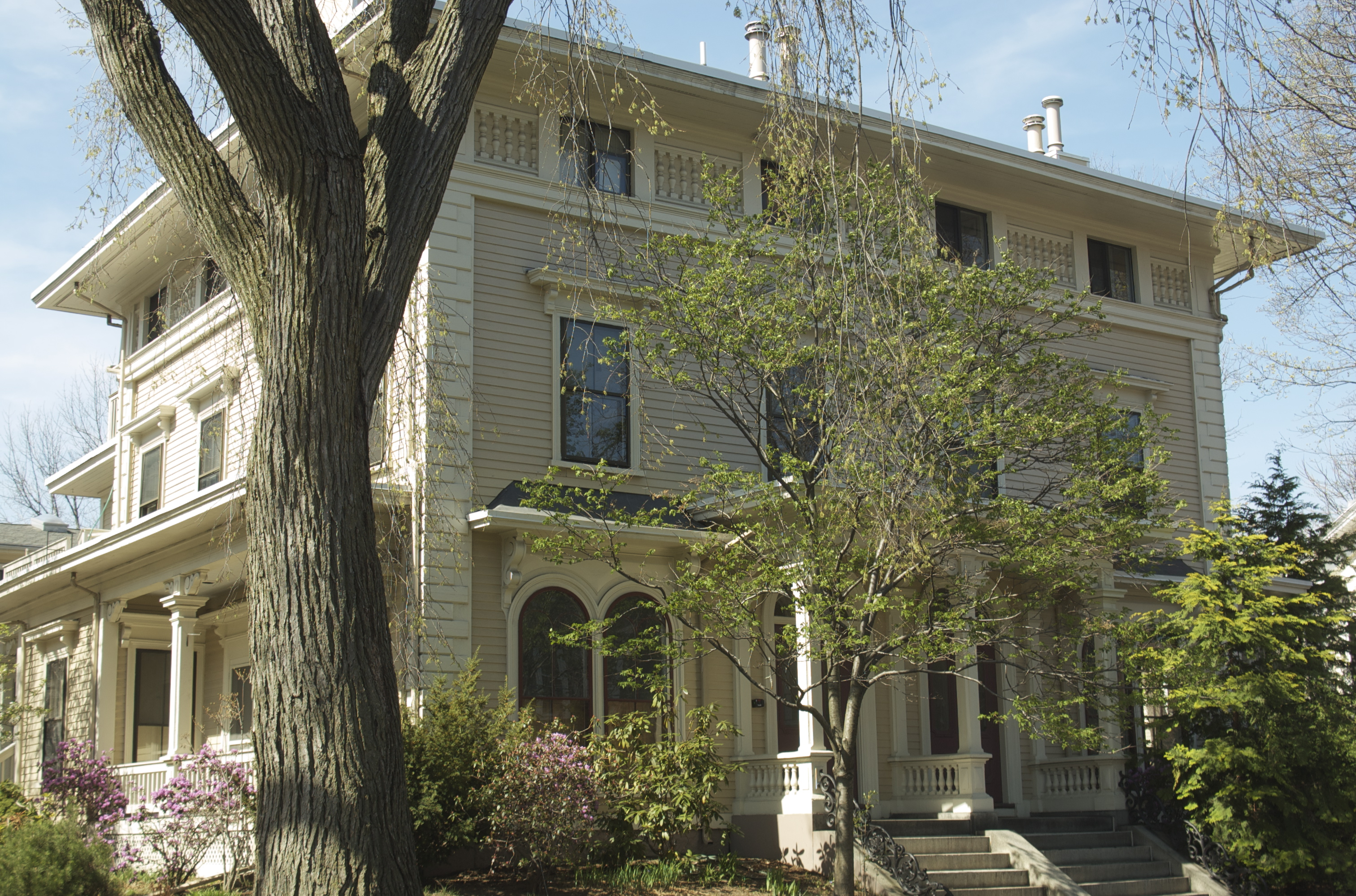

- Location within Massachusetts Location within the United States
- Location: 15–17 Lee St., Cambridge, Massachusetts
- Coordinates: 42°22′07.10″N 71°06′25.8″W
- Built: 1856
- Architect: John Webber
- Architectural style: Italian Villa
- MPS: Cambridge MRA
- NRHP reference No.: 82001930
- Added to NRHP: April 13, 1982

The buildings at 15–17 Lee Street are a historic double house in Cambridge, Massachusetts. The 2 1/2-story wood-frame house was built in 1856, and is a rare local instance of an Italianate duplex. It has paired arched windows on the first floor, a richly decorated front porch, and an extended cornice. The corners of the first two floors have quoining, and the half story above alternates small windows and panels with balusters.

The houses were listed on the National Register of Historic Places in 1982.

== See also ==
- National Register of Historic Places listings in Cambridge, Massachusetts
