= Francis J. Child House =

Historic house in Massachusetts, United States

- U.S. National Register of Historic Places
- U.S. Historic district – Contributing property
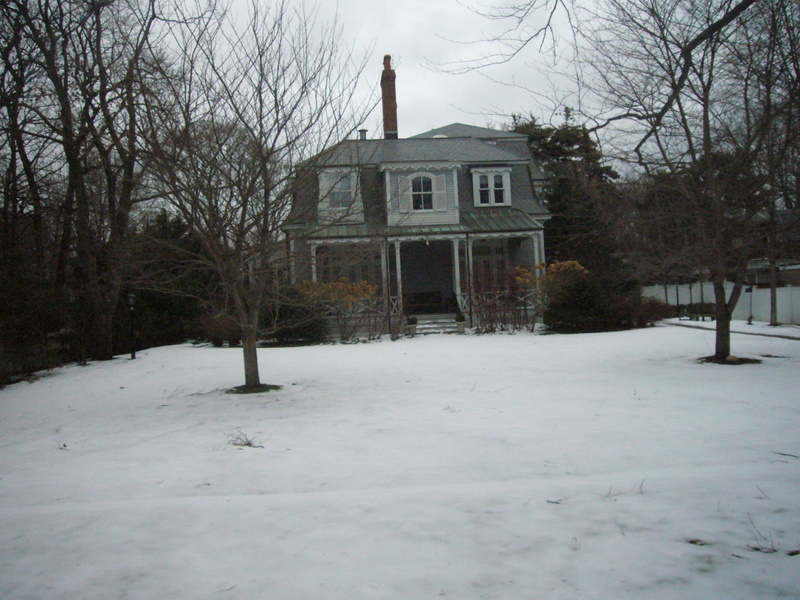

- Location within Massachusetts Location within the United States
- Location: Cambridge, Massachusetts
- Coordinates: 42°22′41″N 71°06′35″W
- Built: 1861
- Architectural style: Second Empire
- Part of: Shady Hill Historic District (ID86001680)
- MPS: Cambridge MRA
- NRHP reference No.: 83000791

Significant dates
- Added to NRHP: June 30, 1983
- Designated CP: May 19, 1986

The Francis J. Child House is an historic house at 67 Kirkland Street in Cambridge, Massachusetts. It is a two-story wood-frame structure, with a mansard roof, wooden clapboard siding, and a porch extending across the main facade. The house was built in 1861, and is a distinctive Second Empire cottage with jigsaw-cut molding over its gable windows. The lower (steep) portion of the mansard roof has hexagonal tiles, and the building retains its original siding.

The house was listed on the National Register of Historic Places in 1983, and included in the Shady Hill Historic District in 1986.

== See also ==
- National Register of Historic Places listings in Cambridge, Massachusetts
- Francis J. Child
