= National Register of Historic Places listings in Cambridge, Massachusetts =

Location of Cambridge in Massachusetts

This is a list of sites listed on the National Register of Historic Places in Cambridge, Massachusetts. This is intended to be a complete list of the properties and districts on the National Register of Historic Places in Cambridge, Massachusetts, United States. Latitude and longitude coordinates are provided for many National Register properties and districts; these locations may be seen together in an online map.

There are 207 properties and districts listed on the National Register in Cambridge, including 18 National Historic Landmarks.

This National Park Service list is complete through NPS recent listings posted August 28, 2026.

== Current listings ==
	Name on the Register	Image	Date listed	Location	Description
1	Edwin Abbot House	Edwin Abbot House	May 10, 1979 (#79000354)	1 Follen St. 42°22′43″N 71°07′24″W	
2	John Aborn House	John Aborn House	April 13, 1982 (#82001883)	41 Orchard St. 42°23′29″N 71°07′14″W	
3	Alewife Brook Parkway	Alewife Brook Parkway	March 18, 2004 (#04000249)	Alewife Brook Parkway; 42°23′45″N 71°08′26″W	
4	Almshouse	Almshouse	April 13, 1982 (#82001908)	45 Matignon Road; 42°24′08″N 71°07′57″W	Property is mostly in Cambridge; building extends into Somerville.
5	American Net and Twine Company Factory	American Net and Twine Company Factory	April 1, 1982 (#82001906)	155 2nd St. 42°22′01″N 71°04′47″W	
6	Ash Street Historic District	Ash Street Historic District	April 13, 1982 (#82001916)	Ash St. and Ash St. Place between Brattle and Mount Auburn Sts. 42°22′30″N 71°07′29″W	
7	Athenaeum Press	Athenaeum Press	April 13, 1982 (#82001917)	215 1st St. 42°21′51″N 71°04′43″W	
8	Ephraim Atwood House	Ephraim Atwood House	June 30, 1983 (#83000781)	110 Hancock St. 42°22′09″N 71°06′28″W	
9	Austin Hall	Austin Hall	April 19, 1972 (#72000128)	Harvard University campus 42°22′37″N 71°07′08″W	
10	Avon Hill Historic District	Avon Hill Historic District	June 30, 1983 (#83000782)	Washington and Walnut Aves. and Agassiz, Humboldt, Arlington and Lancaster Sts. 42°23′09″N 71°07′21″W	
11	B and B Chemical Company	B and B Chemical Company	April 13, 1982 (#82001918)	780 Memorial Dr. 42°21′35″N 71°06′57″W	Flagship center building of the complex is 784 Memorial Drive
12	Maria Baldwin House	Maria Baldwin House	May 11, 1976 (#76000272)	196 Prospect St. 42°22′13″N 71°06′01″W	
13	James B. Barnes House	James B. Barnes House	April 13, 1982 (#82001919)	109 Hampshire Street; 42°22′11″N 71°05′45″W	
14	Beck-Warren House	Beck-Warren House	May 20, 1996 (#96000520)	11 Prescott St. 42°22′23″N 71°06′51″W	
15	Bennink-Douglas Cottages	Bennink-Douglas Cottages	May 19, 1986 (#86001272)	35–51 Walker St. 42°22′48″N 71°07′23″W	
16	Berkeley Street Historic District	Berkeley Street Historic District	April 13, 1982 (#82001920)	Berkeley St.; also 1–8 Berkeley Pl. 42°22′42″N 71°07′33″W	Berkeley Place represents a boundary increase
17	Bertram Hall at Radcliffe College	Bertram Hall at Radcliffe College	May 19, 1986 (#86001270)	53 Shepard St. 42°22′50″N 71°07′27″W	
18	Beth Israel Synagogue	Beth Israel Synagogue	April 13, 1982 (#82001921)	238 Columbia St. 42°22′09″N 71°05′47″W	
19	Bigelow Street Historic District	Bigelow Street Historic District	April 13, 1982 (#82001922)	Bigelow St. 42°22′05″N 71°06′19″W	
20	Frederick Billings House	Frederick Billings House	April 13, 1982 (#82001923)	45 Orchard St. 42°23′30″N 71°07′14″W	
21	George D. Birkhoff House	George D. Birkhoff House	May 15, 1975 (#75000295)	22 Craigie St. 42°22′41″N 71°07′42″W	
22	Blake and Knowles Steam Pump Company National Register District	Blake and Knowles Steam Pump Company National Register District	June 13, 1997 (#97000561)	Bounded by Third, Binney, Fifth, and Rogers Sts. 42°21′58″N 71°05′02″W	
23	Bottle House Block	Bottle House Block	April 13, 1982 (#82001924)	204–214 3rd St. 42°22′02″N 71°04′53″W	
24	E. H. Brabrook House	E. H. Brabrook House	May 19, 1986 (#86001276)	42–44 Avon St. 42°22′59″N 71°07′24″W	
25	William F. Bradbury House	William F. Bradbury House	June 30, 1983 (#83000784)	369 Harvard St. 42°22′17″N 71°06′42″W	
26	Brattle Hall	Brattle Hall	April 13, 1982 (#82001925)	40 Brattle St. 42°22′25″N 71°07′17″W	
27	William Brattle House	William Brattle House	May 8, 1973 (#73000286)	42 Brattle St. 42°22′25″N 71°07′18″W	
28	Percy Bridgman House	Percy Bridgman House	May 15, 1975 (#75000298)	10 Buckingham Pl. 42°22′45″N 71°07′44″W	
29	Luther Brooks House	Luther Brooks House	September 12, 1986 (#86002068)	34 Kirkland St. 42°22′36″N 71°06′47″W	
30	Building at 1707–1709 Cambridge Street	Building at 1707–1709 Cambridge Street	June 30, 1983 (#83000787)	1707–1709 Cambridge St. 42°22′31″N 71°06′44″W	
31	Building at 1715–1717 Cambridge Street	Building at 1715–1717 Cambridge Street	June 30, 1983 (#83000788)	1715–1717 Cambridge St. 42°22′31″N 71°06′45″W	
32	Building at 10 Follen Street	Building at 10 Follen Street	April 13, 1982 (#82001926)	10 Follen St. 42°22′43″N 71°07′21″W	
33	Building at 104–106 Hancock Street	Building at 104–106 Hancock Street	June 30, 1983 (#83000789)	104–106 Hancock St. 42°22′09″N 71°06′28″W	
34	Building at 102–104 Inman Street	Building at 102–104 Inman Street	June 30, 1983 (#83000790)	102–104 Inman St. 42°22′19″N 71°06′05″W	
35	Building at 106–108 Inman St	Building at 106–108 Inman St	April 13, 1982 (#82001927)	106–108 Inman St. 42°22′20″N 71°06′05″W	
36	Buildings at 110–112 Inman St.	Buildings at 110–112 Inman St.	April 13, 1982 (#82001929)	110–112 Inman St. 42°22′21″N 71°06′04″W	
37	Buildings at 15–17 Lee St.	Buildings at 15–17 Lee St.	April 13, 1982 (#82001930)	15–17 Lee St. 42°22′07″N 71°06′25″W	
38	Building at 42 Edward J. Lopez Avenue	Building at 42 Edward J. Lopez Avenue	April 13, 1982 (#82001928)	42 Edward J. Lopez Ave. 42°22′04″N 71°04′48″W	
39	Building at 259 Mount Auburn Street	Building at 259 Mount Auburn Street	June 30, 1983 (#83000786)	259 Mt. Auburn St. 42°22′29″N 71°07′55″W	
40	Cambridge Common Historic District	Cambridge Common Historic District	April 13, 1973 (#73000281)	Garden, Waterhouse, Cambridge, and Peabody Sts., and Massachusetts Ave. Amendment (listed June 30, 1983, refnum 83004293): Massachusetts Ave. and Garden, Waterhouse, Cambridge, and Peabody Sts. Boundary increase and decrease (listed January 26, 1987, refnum 87000499): Roughly northwest of Waterhouse St. on Concord Ave. between Garden and Follen Sts. 42°22′35″N 71°07′15″W	A historic district
41	Cambridge Home for the Aged and Infirm	Cambridge Home for the Aged and Infirm	October 22, 2002 (#02001189)	650 Concord Ave. 42°23′18″N 71°08′57″W	Now Neville Place, a nursing facility.
42	Cambridge Public Library	Cambridge Public Library	April 13, 1982 (#82001931)	449 Broadway; 42°22′27″N 71°06′41″W	
43	Carpenter Center for the Visual Arts	Carpenter Center for the Visual Arts	April 20, 1978 (#78000435)	19 Prescott St. 42°22′25″N 71°06′50″W	
44	Central Square Historic District	Central Square Historic District	March 2, 1990 (#90000128)	Roughly Massachusetts Ave. from Clinton St. to Main St. Boundary increase (listed July 11, 2012, refnum 12000404): Roughly 831 to 351–355 Massachusetts Ave. 42°21′54″N 71°06′13″W	
45	Charles River Basin Historic District	Charles River Basin Historic District	December 22, 1978 (#78000436)	Both banks of the Charles River from Eliot Bridge to Charles River Dam; 42°21′25″N 71°05′03″W	
46	Charles River Reservation Parkways	Charles River Reservation Parkways	January 18, 2006 (#05001530)	Soldiers Field, Nonantum, Leo Birmingham, Arsenal, Greenough, N. Beacon, Charles River, Norumbega, Recreation; 42°22′03″N 71°08′11″W	Extends into Newton, Waltham, and Watertown and Weston, elsewhere in Middlesex County, and into Boston in Suffolk County
47	Francis J. Child House	Francis J. Child House	June 30, 1983 (#83000791)	67 Kirkland St. 42°22′40″N 71°06′34″W	
48	Christ Church	Christ Church	October 15, 1966 (#66000140)	Garden St. 42°22′31″N 71°07′16″W	
49	Church of the New Jerusalem	Church of the New Jerusalem	June 30, 1983 (#83000792)	50 Quincy St. 42°22′35″N 71°06′50″W	Also known as Cambridge Swedenborg Chapel
50	City Hall Historic District	City Hall Historic District	April 13, 1982 (#82001932)	Massachusetts Ave., Bigelow and Temple Sts, Inman and Richard Allen Dr. 42°22′00″N 71°06′20″W	
51	George Close Company Building	George Close Company Building	March 15, 2019 (#100003472)	243 Broadway; 42°22′02″N 71°05′44″W	
52	Cloverden	Cloverden	June 30, 1983 (#83000793)	29 Follen St. 42°22′44″N 71°07′16″W	
53	Sara Foster Colburn House	Sara Foster Colburn House	April 13, 1982 (#82004968)	7 Dana St. 42°22′12″N 71°06′37″W	
54	Conventual Church of St. Mary and St. John	Conventual Church of St. Mary and St. John	April 13, 1982 (#82001933)	980 Memorial Dr. 42°22′20″N 71°07′29″W	
55	William Cook House	William Cook House	April 13, 1982 (#82001934)	71 Appleton St. 42°22′46″N 71°08′02″W	
56	Josiah Coolidge House	Josiah Coolidge House	June 30, 1983 (#83000795)	24 Coolidge Hill Rd. 42°22′27″N 71°08′23″W	
57	Cooper-Frost-Austin House	Cooper-Frost-Austin House	September 22, 1972 (#72000124)	21 Linnaean St. 42°23′04″N 71°07′18″W	
58	Craigie Arms	Craigie Arms	July 10, 1986 (#86001575)	2–6 University Rd., 122 Mt. Auburn, and 6 Bennett Sts. 42°22′22″N 71°07′25″W	
59	e.e. cummings House	e.e. cummings House	June 30, 1983 (#83000796)	104 Irving St. 42°22′44″N 71°06′38″W	
60	Reginald A. Daly House	Reginald A. Daly House	January 7, 1976 (#76000305)	23 Hawthorn St. 42°22′31″N 71°07′34″W	
61	Dana-Palmer House	Dana-Palmer House	May 19, 1986 (#86001682)	12–16 Quincy St. 42°22′23″N 71°06′53″W	
62	William Morris Davis House	William Morris Davis House	January 7, 1976 (#76000306)	17 Francis Ave. 42°22′42″N 71°06′43″W	
63	Anna Day House	Anna Day House	April 13, 1982 (#82001935)	139 Cushing St. 42°22′43″N 71°09′08″W	
64	Deane-Williams House	Deane-Williams House	April 13, 1982 (#82001936)	21–23 Fayette St. 42°22′20″N 71°06′13″W	
65	DeRosay-McNamee House	DeRosay-McNamee House	March 2, 1990 (#90000142)	50 Mt. Vernon St. 42°23′14″N 71°07′17″W	
66	Divinity Hall	Divinity Hall	September 12, 1986 (#86002071)	12 Divinity Ave. 42°22′43″N 71°06′53″W	
67	Edward Dodge House	Edward Dodge House	April 13, 1982 (#82001937)	70 Sparks St. 42°22′47″N 71°07′53″W	
68	The Dunvegan	The Dunvegan	May 19, 1986 (#86001279)	1654 Massachusetts Ave. 42°22′54″N 71°07′12″W	
69	East Cambridge Historic District	East Cambridge Historic District	June 30, 1983 (#83000797)	Roughly bounded by Cambridge, Hurley and 5th Sts. 42°22′12″N 71°04′51″W	
70	East Cambridge Savings Bank	East Cambridge Savings Bank	April 13, 1982 (#82001938)	292 Cambridge St. 42°22′16″N 71°04′51″W	
71	Eliot Hall at Radcliffe College	Eliot Hall at Radcliffe College	May 19, 1986 (#86001280)	51 Shepard St. 42°22′52″N 71°07′25″W	
72	Asa Ellis House	Asa Ellis House	June 30, 1983 (#83000798)	158 Auburn St. 42°21′49″N 71°06′18″W	
73	Elmwood	Elmwood	October 15, 1966 (#66000364)	33 Elmwood Ave. 42°22′31″N 71°08′19″W	
74	R.H. Farwell House	R.H. Farwell House	April 13, 1982 (#82001939)	2222–2224 Massachusetts Ave. 42°23′37″N 71°07′34″W	
75	Isaac Fay House	Isaac Fay House	June 30, 1983 (#83000799)	125 Antrim St. 42°22′23″N 71°06′06″W	
76	First Baptist Church	First Baptist Church	April 14, 1975 (#75000249)	Magazine and River Sts. 42°21′53″N 71°06′20″W	
77	Ernst Flentje House	Ernst Flentje House	June 30, 1983 (#83000800)	129 Magazine St. 42°21′32″N 71°06′40″W	
78	Fogg Art Museum	Fogg Art Museum	May 19, 1986 (#86001282)	26–32 Quincy St. 42°22′27″N 71°06′53″W	
79	Follen Street Historic District	Follen Street Historic District	May 19, 1986 (#86001681)	1–44 and 5–29 Follen St. 42°22′43″N 71°07′19″W	
80	Fort Washington	Fort Washington	April 3, 1973 (#73000284)	95 Waverly St. 42°21′23″N 71°06′17″W	
81	Fresh Pond Hotel	Fresh Pond Hotel	April 13, 1982 (#82001940)	234 Lakeview Ave. 42°22′59″N 71°08′28″W	
82	Fresh Pond Parkway-Metropolitan Park System of Greater Boston	Fresh Pond Parkway-Metropolitan Park System of Greater Boston	January 5, 2005 (#04001429)	Fresh Pond Parkway; 42°22′48″N 71°08′40″W	
83	David Frost House	David Frost House	June 30, 1983 (#83000801)	26 Gray St. 42°23′00″N 71°07′20″W	
84	Elizabeth Frost Tenanthouse	Elizabeth Frost Tenanthouse	June 30, 1983 (#83000802)	35 Bowdoin St. 42°23′01″N 71°07′17″W	
85	Robert Frost House	Robert Frost House	April 13, 1982 (#82001941)	29–35 Brewster St. 42°22′43″N 71°07′56″W	
86	Walter Frost House	Walter Frost House	April 13, 1982 (#82001942)	10 Frost St. 42°23′10″N 71°07′03″W	
87	Margaret Fuller House	Margaret Fuller House	July 2, 1971 (#71000686)	71 Cherry St. 42°21′52″N 71°05′51″W	
88	George Gale House	George Gale House	February 10, 1988 (#87002543)	14–16 Clinton St. 42°22′06″N 71°06′22″W	
89	Garfield Street Historic District	Garfield Street Historic District	June 30, 1983 (#83000803)	Garfield St. between Massachusetts Ave. and Oxford St. 42°23′02″N 71°07′06″W	
90	Gray Gardens East and West Historic District	Gray Gardens East and West Historic District	May 19, 1986 (#86001283)	1–37 Gray Gardens E, 3–24 Gray Gardens W, 91 Garden and 60 Raymond Sts. 42°23′01″N 71°07′43″W	
91	Asa Gray House	Asa Gray House	October 15, 1966 (#66000655)	88 Garden St. 42°22′59″N 71°07′41″W	
92	Greek Revival Cottage	Greek Revival Cottage	April 13, 1982 (#82001943)	59 Rice St. 42°23′39″N 71°07′47″W	
93	Hall Tavern	Hall Tavern	June 30, 1983 (#83000806)	20 Gray Gardens West St. 42°22′59″N 71°07′46″W	
94	Richard Hapgood House	Richard Hapgood House	May 19, 1986 (#86001284)	382–392 Harvard St. 42°22′18″N 71°06′48″W	
95	Harvard Houses Historic District	Harvard Houses Historic District	September 12, 1986 (#86002073)	Roughly bounded by Mt. Auburn, Grant, and Cowperwaite Sts., Banks St., Putman Ave., Memorial Drive, and John F. Kennedy St. 42°22′12″N 71°07′05″W	
96	Harvard Lampoon Building	Harvard Lampoon Building	March 30, 1978 (#78000440)	44 Bow St. 42°22′18″N 71°07′04″W	
97	Harvard Square Historic District	Harvard Square Historic District	April 13, 1982 (#82001944)	Massachusetts Ave., John F. Kennedy and Brattle Sts.; also roughly bounded by Massachusetts Ave. and Harvard, Mt. Auburn, Winthrop, Bennett, Story, and Church Sts. 42°22′25″N 71°07′11″W	Second set of boundaries represents a boundary increase
98	Harvard Square Subway Kiosk	Harvard Square Subway Kiosk	January 30, 1978 (#78000441)	Massachusetts Ave. and John F. Kennedy St. 42°22′25″N 71°07′08″W	
99	Harvard Street Historic District	Harvard Street Historic District	April 13, 1982 (#82001945)	Harvard St. between Ellery and Hancock Sts. 42°22′14″N 71°06′35″W	
100	Harvard Union	Harvard Union	January 26, 1987 (#87000500)	Quincy and Harvard Sts. 42°22′21″N 71°06′54″W	
101	Harvard Yard Historic District	Harvard Yard Historic District	February 6, 1973 (#73000287)	Roughly bounded by an underpass, Broadway and Quincy Sts., Massachusetts Ave., and Peabody St. 42°22′28″N 71°07′02″W	Originally listed as "Old Harvard Yard"; expanded and renamed December 14, 1987
102	Hastings Square Historic District	Hastings Square Historic District	April 13, 1982 (#82001946)	Roughly bounded by Rockingham, Henry, Chestnut and Brookline Sts. 42°21′23″N 71°06′36″W	
103	Oliver Hastings House	Oliver Hastings House	December 30, 1970 (#70000681)	101 Brattle St. 42°22′35″N 71°07′33″W	
104	Hasty Pudding Club	Hasty Pudding Club	January 9, 1978 (#78000442)	12 Holyoke St. 42°22′21″N 71°07′05″W	
105	Henderson Carriage Repository	Henderson Carriage Repository	April 13, 1982 (#82001947)	2067–2089 Massachusetts Ave. 42°23′29″N 71°07′23″W	
106	Col. Thomas Wentworth Higginson House	Col. Thomas Wentworth Higginson House	April 13, 1982 (#82001948)	29 Buckingham St. 42°22′50″N 71°07′47″W	
107	Aaron Hill House	Aaron Hill House	June 30, 1983 (#83000807)	17 Brown St. 42°22′34″N 71°07′44″W	
108	Joseph Holmes House	Joseph Holmes House	June 30, 1983 (#83000808)	144 Coolidge Hill St. 42°22′20″N 71°08′24″W	
109	Homer-Lovell House	Homer-Lovell House	December 22, 1983 (#83004030)	11 Forest St. 42°23′07″N 71°07′04″W	
110	Hooper-Eliot House	Hooper-Eliot House	June 30, 1983 (#83000809)	25 Reservoir Rd. 42°22′44″N 71°08′13″W	
111	Hooper-Lee-Nichols House	Hooper-Lee-Nichols House	June 15, 1979 (#79000355)	159 Brattle St. 42°22′39″N 71°08′03″W	
112	Howe House	Howe House	June 30, 1983 (#83000811)	6 Appleton St. 42°22′41″N 71°08′00″W	
113	William Dean Howells House	William Dean Howells House	April 13, 1982 (#82001949)	37 Concord Ave. 42°22′48″N 71°07′36″W	
114	Benjamin Hoyt House	Benjamin Hoyt House	April 13, 1982 (#82001953)	134 Otis St. 42°22′15″N 71°05′04″W	
115	Hubbard Park Historic District	Hubbard Park Historic District	April 13, 1982 (#82001950)	Hubbard Park, Mercer Circle and Sparks Sts. 42°22′36″N 71°07′54″W	
116	Inman Square Historic District	Inman Square Historic District	April 13, 1982 (#82001951)	Hampshire, Cambridge, and Inman Sts. 42°22′25″N 71°06′05″W	
117	The Jarvis	The Jarvis	May 19, 1986 (#86001308)	27 Everett St. 42°22′48″N 71°07′03″W	
118	William R. Jones House	William R. Jones House	June 30, 1983 (#83000813)	307 Harvard St. 42°22′12″N 71°06′23″W	
119	F. A. Kennedy Steam Bakery	F. A. Kennedy Steam Bakery	January 4, 1990 (#89002285)	129 Franklin St. 42°21′44″N 71°06′05″W	
120	Kidder-Sargent-McCrehan House	Kidder-Sargent-McCrehan House	April 13, 1982 (#82001952)	146 Rindge Ave. 42°23′36″N 71°07′49″W	
121	Chester Kingsley House	Chester Kingsley House	April 13, 1982 (#82001954)	10 Chester St. 42°23′37″N 71°07′29″W	
122	Kirkland Place Historic District	Kirkland Place Historic District	May 19, 1986 (#86001683)	Kirkland Pl. 42°22′40″N 71°06′46″W	
123	Rufus Lamson House	Rufus Lamson House	April 13, 1982 (#82001955)	72–74 Hampshire St. 42°22′04″N 71°05′38″W	
124	The Larches	The Larches	April 13, 1982 (#82001956)	22 Larch Rd. 42°22′36″N 71°08′35″W	
125	Lechmere Point Corporation Houses	Lechmere Point Corporation Houses	April 13, 1982 (#82001957)	45–51 Gore St. and 25 3rd St. 42°22′18″N 71°04′49″W	
126	Arthur D. Little, Inc. Building	Arthur D. Little, Inc. Building	December 8, 1976 (#76001970)	30 Memorial Dr. 42°21′40″N 71°04′56″W	
127	Littlefield-Roberts House	Littlefield-Roberts House	September 12, 1986 (#86002070)	16 Prescott St. 42°22′24″N 71°06′50″W	
128	Longfellow National Historic Site	Longfellow National Historic Site	October 15, 1966 (#66000049)	105 Brattle St. 42°22′36″N 71°07′35″W	
129	Lovell Block	Lovell Block	June 30, 1983 (#83000814)	1853 Massachusetts Ave. 42°23′16″N 71°07′08″W	
130	Joseph Lovering House	Joseph Lovering House	September 12, 1986 (#86002076)	38 Kirkland St. 42°22′37″N 71°06′45″W	
131	Lowell School	Lowell School	April 13, 1982 (#82001958)	25 Lowell St. 42°22′31″N 71°08′00″W	
132	The Lowell	The Lowell	June 30, 1983 (#83000815)	33 Lexington Ave. 42°22′37″N 71°08′25″W	
133	Maple Avenue Historic District	Maple Avenue Historic District	June 30, 1983 (#83000816)	Maple Ave. between Marie Ave. and Broadway; 42°22′20″N 71°06′18″W	
134	Josiah Mason, Jr. House	Josiah Mason, Jr. House	April 13, 1982 (#82001959)	11 Market St. 42°22′01″N 71°05′40″W	
135	W. A. Mason House	W. A. Mason House	June 30, 1983 (#83000817)	87 Raymond St. 42°23′09″N 71°07′35″W	
136	Massachusetts Hall, Harvard University	Massachusetts Hall, Harvard University	October 15, 1966 (#66000769)	Harvard University Yard; 42°22′28″N 71°07′06″W	
137	Isaac McLean House	Isaac McLean House	April 13, 1982 (#82001960)	2218 Massachusetts Ave. 42°23′36″N 71°07′34″W	Hartwell and Richardson, architects (1894).
138	Alpheus Mead House	Alpheus Mead House	April 13, 1982 (#82001961)	2200 Massachusetts Ave. 42°23′35″N 71°07′32″W	
139	Isaac Melvin House	Isaac Melvin House	April 13, 1982 (#82001962)	19 Centre St. 42°22′11″N 71°06′34″W	
140	Memorial Drive Apartments Historic District	Memorial Drive Apartments Historic District	May 19, 1986 (#86001310)	983–989, and 992–993 Memorial Dr. 42°22′22″N 71°07′33″W	
141	Memorial Hall, Harvard University	Memorial Hall, Harvard University	December 30, 1970 (#70000685)	Cambridge and Quincy Sts., Harvard University campus 42°22′33″N 71°06′54″W	
142	The Montrose	The Montrose	May 19, 1986 (#86001311)	1648 Massachusetts Ave. 42°22′53″N 71°07′12″W	
143	Mount Auburn Cemetery	Mount Auburn Cemetery	April 21, 1975 (#75000254)	580 Mount Auburn St. 42°22′14″N 71°08′45″W	Declared a National Historic Landmark on May 27, 2003 with a small boundary increase
144	Mount Auburn Cemetery Reception House	Mount Auburn Cemetery Reception House	June 30, 1983 (#83000818)	583 Mt. Auburn St. 42°22′32″N 71°08′42″W	The cemetery's first (1870) reception house, located across the street from the main entrance.
145	New England Confectionery Company Factory	New England Confectionery Company Factory	November 9, 2005 (#05001209)	250 Massachusetts Ave. 42°21′39″N 71°05′54″W	
146	Andrew Newman House	Andrew Newman House	April 13, 1982 (#82001963)	23 Fairmont St. 42°21′41″N 71°06′37″W	
147	Norfolk Street Historic District	Norfolk Street Historic District	April 13, 1982 (#82001964)	Norfolk St. between Suffolk and Austin Sts. 42°21′57″N 71°06′04″W	
148	North Avenue Congregational Church	North Avenue Congregational Church	June 30, 1983 (#83000819)	1801 Massachusetts Ave. 42°23′11″N 71°07′07″W	
149	J.A. Noyes House	J.A. Noyes House	April 13, 1982 (#82001965)	1 Highland St. 42°22′46″N 71°07′54″W	
150	Odd Fellows Hall	Odd Fellows Hall	April 13, 1982 (#82001967)	536 Massachusetts Ave. 42°21′51″N 71°06′09″W	Hartwell and Richardson, architects (1884).
151	Old Cambridge Baptist Church	Old Cambridge Baptist Church	April 13, 1982 (#82001968)	398 Harvard St. 42°22′19″N 71°06′51″W	
152	Old Cambridge Historic District	Old Cambridge Historic District	June 30, 1983 (#83000821)	Irregular pattern along Brattle St. 42°22′37″N 71°08′25″W	
153	Old Cambridgeport Historic District	Old Cambridgeport Historic District	June 30, 1983 (#83000820)	Cherry, Harvard and Washington Sts. 42°21′57″N 71°05′50″W	Spelled "Cambridgport" on the National Register.
154	Opposition House	Opposition House	April 13, 1982 (#82001969)	2–4 Hancock Pl. 42°22′11″N 71°06′25″W	
155	Sarah Orne House	Sarah Orne House	June 30, 1983 (#83000822)	10 Coolidge Hill Rd. 42°22′27″N 71°08′18″W	
156	Peabody Court Apartments	Peabody Court Apartments	May 19, 1986 (#86001312)	41–43 Linnaean St. 42°23′00″N 71°07′26″W	
157	Porcellian Club	Porcellian Club	June 30, 1983 (#83000824)	1320–24 Massachusetts Ave. 42°22′23″N 71°07′04″W	
158	Dexter Pratt House	Dexter Pratt House	May 8, 1973 (#73000288)	54 Brattle St. 42°22′28″N 71°07′19″W	
159	Prospect Congregational Church	Prospect Congregational Church	April 13, 1982 (#82001970)	99 Prospect St. 42°22′04″N 71°06′09″W	
160	Cheney Read House	Cheney Read House	April 13, 1982 (#82001971)	135 Western Ave. 42°21′54″N 71°06′31″W	
161	Edmund Reardon House	Edmund Reardon House	April 13, 1982 (#82001972)	195 Erie St. 42°21′37″N 71°06′31″W	
162	Reversible Collar Company Building	Reversible Collar Company Building	September 27, 1985 (#85002663)	25–27 Mt. Auburn & 10–12 Arrow Sts. 42°22′15″N 71°06′55″W	
163	Theodore W. Richards House	Theodore W. Richards House	January 7, 1976 (#76001999)	15 Follen St. 42°22′43″N 71°07′19″W	
164	River Street Firehouse	River Street Firehouse	April 13, 1982 (#82001973)	176 River St. 42°21′48″N 71°06′36″W	
165	Sacred Heart Church, Rectory, School and Convent	Sacred Heart Church, Rectory, School and Convent	April 13, 1982 (#82001974)	6th and Thorndike Sts. 42°22′15″N 71°05′06″W	
166	St. James Episcopal Church	St. James Episcopal Church	June 30, 1983 (#83000828)	1991 Massachusetts Ave. 42°23′27″N 71°07′16″W	
167	St. John's Roman Catholic Church	St. John's Roman Catholic Church	June 30, 1983 (#83000829)	2270 Massachusetts Ave. 42°23′40″N 71°07′38″W	
168	Salem-Auburn Streets Historic District	Salem-Auburn Streets Historic District	April 13, 1982 (#82001975)	Salem and Auburn Sts. 42°21′46″N 71°06′14″W	
169	Hiram Sands House	Hiram Sands House	April 30, 1976 (#76000238)	22 Putnam Ave. 42°22′10″N 71°06′48″W	
170	Ivory Sands House	Ivory Sands House	April 13, 1982 (#82001976)	145 Elm St. 42°22′13″N 71°05′49″W	
171	William Saunders House	William Saunders House	June 30, 1983 (#83000825)	6 Prentiss St. 42°23′04″N 71°07′08″W	
172	Sears Tower-Harvard Observatory	Sears Tower-Harvard Observatory	February 26, 1987 (#86002075)	60 Garden St. 42°22′54″N 71°07′42″W	
173	Second Cambridge Savings Bank Building	Second Cambridge Savings Bank Building	June 30, 1983 (#83000826)	11–21 Dunster St. 42°22′22″N 71°07′09″W	
174	Second Waterhouse House	Second Waterhouse House	June 30, 1983 (#83000827)	9 Follen St. 42°22′43″N 71°07′21″W	
175	Sever Hall, Harvard University	Sever Hall, Harvard University	December 30, 1970 (#70000732)	Harvard Yard; 42°22′27″N 71°06′56″W	
176	Shady Hill Historic District	Shady Hill Historic District	May 19, 1986 (#86001680)	Roughly bounded by Museum, Beacon and Holden, and Kirkland Sts., and Francis Ave. 42°22′45″N 71°06′41″W	
177	Shell Oil Company "Spectacular" Sign	Shell Oil Company "Spectacular" Sign	June 3, 1994 (#94000546)	187 Magazine St. 42°21′25″N 71°06′52″W	
178	Patrick Slowey House	Patrick Slowey House	April 13, 1982 (#82001977)	71 Bolton St. 42°23′25″N 71°07′55″W	Listed at 73 Bolton St.
179	Lawrence Soule House	Lawrence Soule House	April 13, 1982 (#82001978)	11 Russell St. 42°23′33″N 71°07′25″W	
180	The Stanstead	The Stanstead	May 19, 1986 (#86001313)	19 Ware St. 42°22′24″N 71°06′46″W	
181	Stickney-Shepard House	Stickney-Shepard House	May 19, 1986 (#86001315)	11–13 Remington St. 42°22′16″N 71°06′48″W	
182	Mary Fisk Stoughton House	Mary Fisk Stoughton House	June 29, 1989 (#89001246)	90 Brattle St. 42°22′33″N 71°07′29″W	
183	Taylor Square Firehouse	Taylor Square Firehouse	April 13, 1982 (#82001979)	113 Garden St. 42°23′03″N 71°07′47″W	
184	Treadwell-Sparks House	Treadwell-Sparks House	September 12, 1986 (#86002078)	21 Kirkland St. 42°22′36″N 71°06′54″W	
185	Union Railway Car Barn	Union Railway Car Barn	April 13, 1982 (#82001980)	613–621 Cambridge St. 42°22′19″N 71°05′13″W	
186	University Hall, Harvard University	University Hall, Harvard University	December 30, 1970 (#70000736)	Harvard Yard; 42°22′28″N 71°07′02″W	
187	University Museum	University Museum	September 12, 1986 (#86002081)	11–25 Divinity Ave. 42°22′19″N 71°06′57″W	
188	Upper Magazine Street Historic District	Upper Magazine Street Historic District	April 13, 1982 (#82001981)	Cottage, Magazine, William and Perry Sts. 42°21′47″N 71°06′25″W	
189	Urban Rowhouse	Urban Rowhouse	April 13, 1982 (#82001983)	30–38 Pearl St. 42°21′50″N 71°06′12″W	
190	Urban Rowhouse	Urban Rowhouse	April 13, 1982 (#82001982)	40–48 Pearl St. 42°21′49″N 71°06′13″W	
191	Urban Rowhouse	Urban Rowhouse	June 30, 1983 (#83000831)	26–32 River St. 42°21′53″N 71°06′21″W	
192	US Post Office-Central Square	US Post Office-Central Square	June 18, 1986 (#86001343)	770 Massachusetts Ave. 42°21′59″N 71°06′21″W	
193	Valentine Soap Workers Cottage	Valentine Soap Workers Cottage	June 30, 1983 (#83000832)	5–7 Cottage Street; 42°21′45″N 71°06′20″W	
194	Valentine Soap Workers Cottage	Valentine Soap Workers Cottage	June 30, 1983 (#83000833)	101 Pearl Street; 42°21′45″N 71°06′19″W	
195	Albert Vinal House	Albert Vinal House	June 30, 1983 (#83000834)	325 Harvard St. 42°22′14″N 71°06′30″W	
196	Walden Street Cattle Pass	Walden Street Cattle Pass	June 3, 1994 (#94000554)	Adjacent to MBTA right-of-way at Walden St. 42°23′22″N 71°07′29″W	
197	Ware Hall	Ware Hall	June 30, 1983 (#83000835)	383 Harvard St. 42°22′19″N 71°06′49″W	
198	Langford H. Warren House	Langford H. Warren House	May 19, 1986 (#86001317)	6 Garden Terr. 42°22′57″N 71°07′41″W	
199	Abraham Watson House	Abraham Watson House	April 13, 1982 (#82001984)	181–183 Sherman St. 42°23′33″N 71°07′58″W	
200	Stillman Willis House	Stillman Willis House	April 13, 1982 (#82001985)	1 Potter Park; 42°23′04″N 71°07′14″W	
201	Winter Street Historic District	Winter Street Historic District	April 13, 1982 (#82001986)	Winter St. 42°22′22″N 71°04′54″W	
202	The John Winthrop Chambers	The John Winthrop Chambers	August 22, 2023 (#100009286)	78-80 Porter Rd. 42°23′23″N 71°07′16″W	
203	S. B. Withey House	S. B. Withey House	May 19, 1986 (#86001318)	10 Appian Way; 42°22′31″N 71°07′18″W	
204	J. A. Wood House	J. A. Wood House	May 19, 1986 (#86001319)	3 Sacramento St. 42°22′58″N 71°07′09″W	Hartwell and Richardson, architects (1888).
205	Wyeth Brickyard Superintendent's House	Wyeth Brickyard Superintendent's House	April 13, 1982 (#82001987)	336 Rindge Ave. 42°23′36″N 71°08′15″W	
206	John Wyeth House	John Wyeth House	April 13, 1982 (#82001988)	56 Aberdeen Ave. 42°22′36″N 71°08′48″W	
207	Wyeth-Smith House	Wyeth-Smith House	April 13, 1982 (#82001989)	152 Vassal Lane; 42°23′01″N 71°08′20″W	

== Former listing ==
	Name on the Register	Image	Date listed	Date removed	Location	City or town	Description
1	Cornerstone Baptist Church		February 8, 1979 (#79000363)	January 21, 1980	2114 Massachusetts Ave.		Destroyed by fire on October 31, 1979.

== See also ==
- Blue plaque
- List of National Historic Landmarks in Massachusetts
- National Register of Historic Places listings in Massachusetts
- National Register of Historic Places listings in Middlesex County, Massachusetts
