= Lowell School (Cambridge, Massachusetts) =

- U.S. National Register of Historic Places
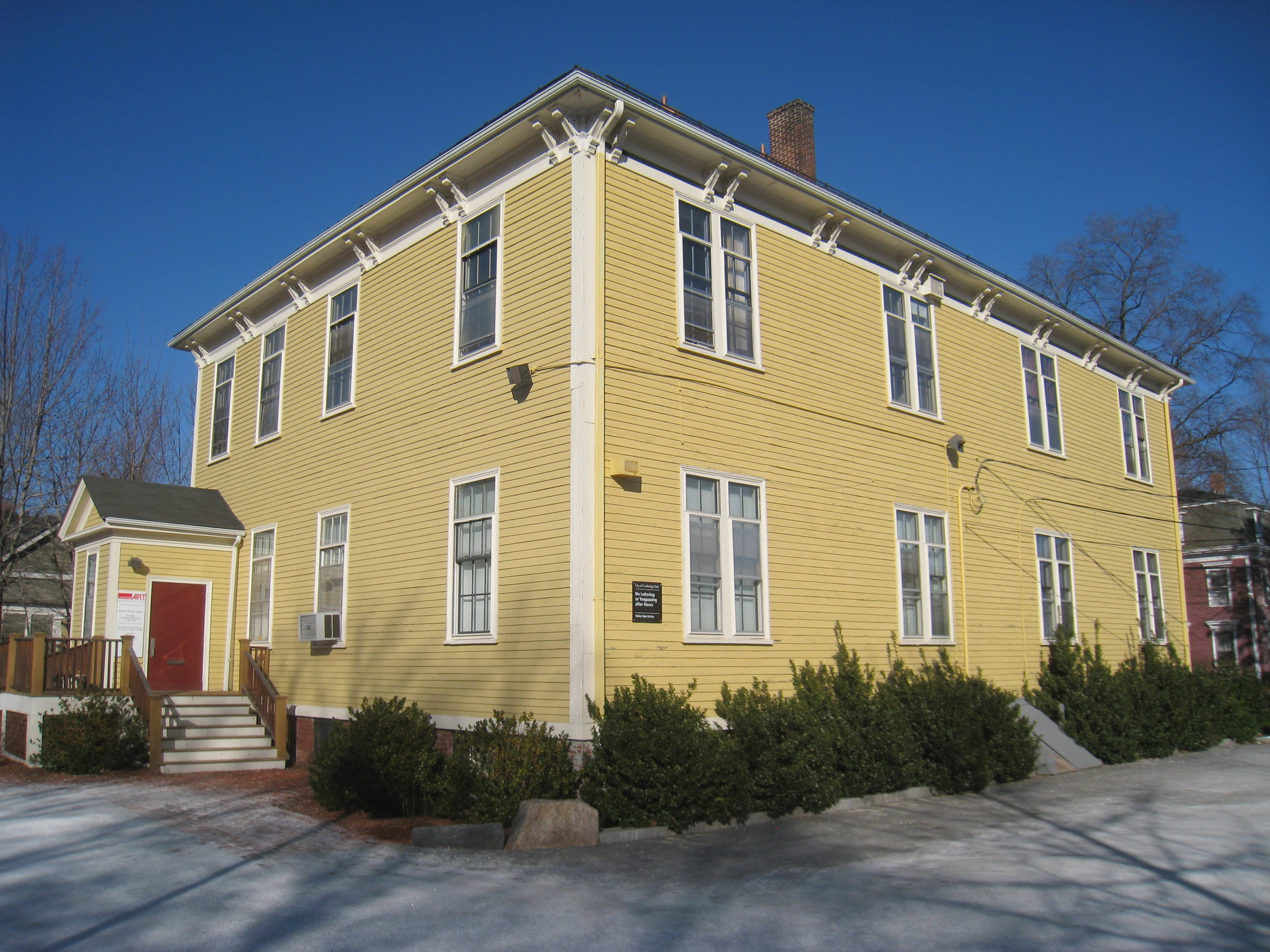

- Location within Massachusetts Location within the United States
- Location: Cambridge, Massachusetts
- Coordinates: 42°22′31.5″N 71°8′0.5″W
- Built: 1883
- Architect: James Fogerty
- Architectural style: Italianate
- MPS: Cambridge MRA
- NRHP reference No.: 82001958
- Added to NRHP: April 13, 1982

The Lowell School is an historic school building located at 25 Lowell Street in Cambridge, Massachusetts. Built in 1883, it is the only surviving wood-frame school building in the city. It is a two-story structure with a hip roof, clapboard siding, and a brick foundation. The building features minimal decoration, with Italianate brackets in the eaves and paired narrow windows in the Italianate style. It was designed by local architect James Fogerty, assisted by his son, George Fogerty, who both designed many public, commercial, and residential buildings in the city.

The building was listed on the National Register of Historic Places in 1982.

== See also ==
- National Register of Historic Places listings in Cambridge, Massachusetts
