= Josiah Mason Jr. House =

Historic house in Massachusetts, United States

- U.S. National Register of Historic Places
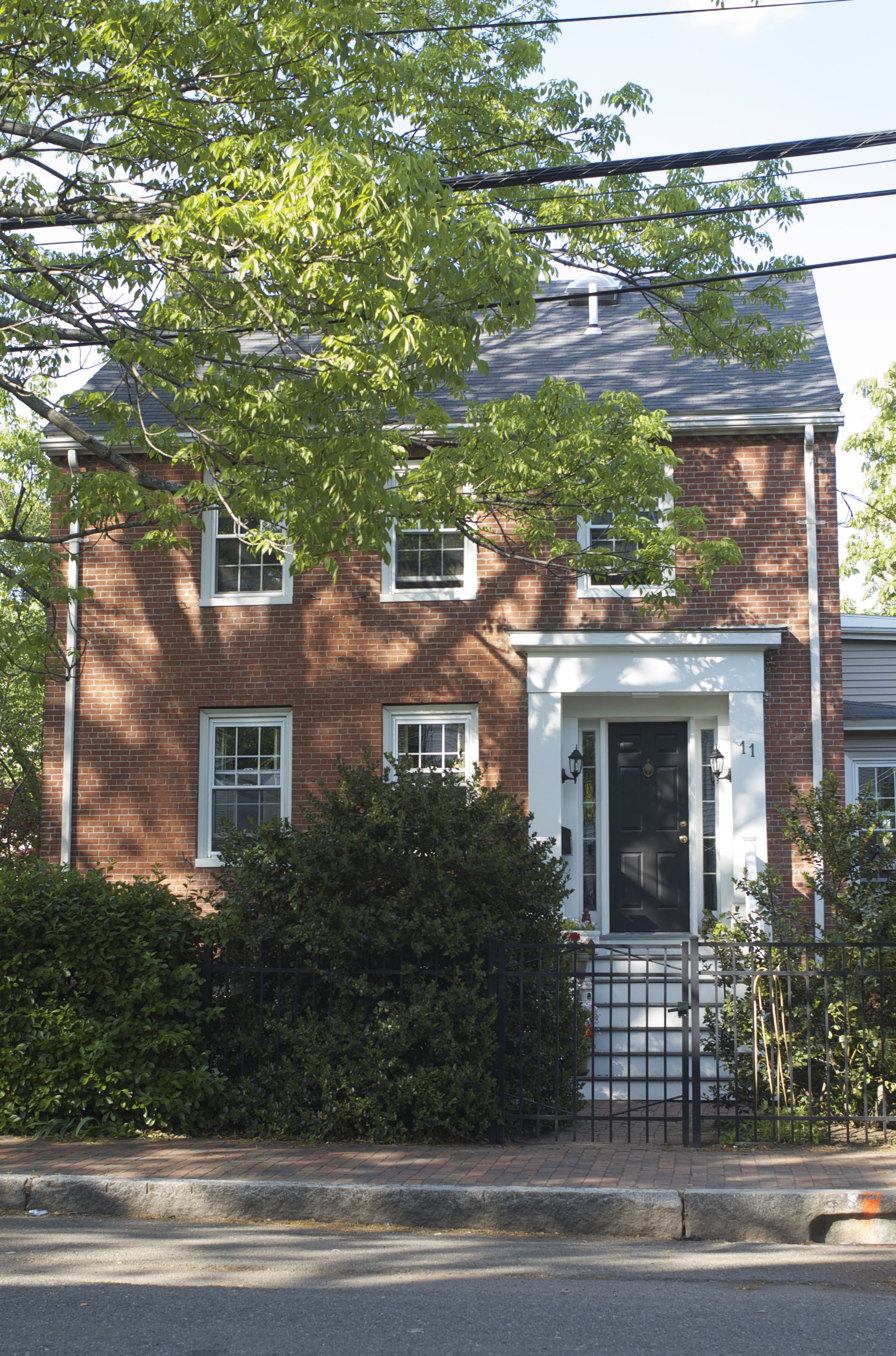

- Location within Massachusetts Location within the United States
- Location: 11 Market Street, Cambridge, Massachusetts
- Coordinates: 42°22′01.6″N 71°05′38.2″W
- Built: 1831
- Architectural style: Federal
- MPS: Cambridge MRA
- NRHP reference No.: 82001959
- Added to NRHP: April 13, 1982

The Josiah Mason Jr. House is a historic house in Cambridge, Massachusetts.

== Description and history ==
It is a 2 1/2-story brick structure, three bays wide, with a side-gable roof and a single end chimney. The entrance, located in the rightmost bay, is in a recess flanked by sidelight windows. The recess is framed by a Greek Revival surround with pilasters and entablature. Built in 1831, this house is a locally rare example of late Federal style architecture with a side-hall plan. Josiah Mason was a local merchant and politician who served as Cambridge selectman and in the state legislature.

The house was listed on the National Register of Historic Places in 1982.

== See also ==
- National Register of Historic Places listings in Cambridge, Massachusetts
