= Sarah Orne House =

Historic house in Massachusetts, United States

- U.S. National Register of Historic Places
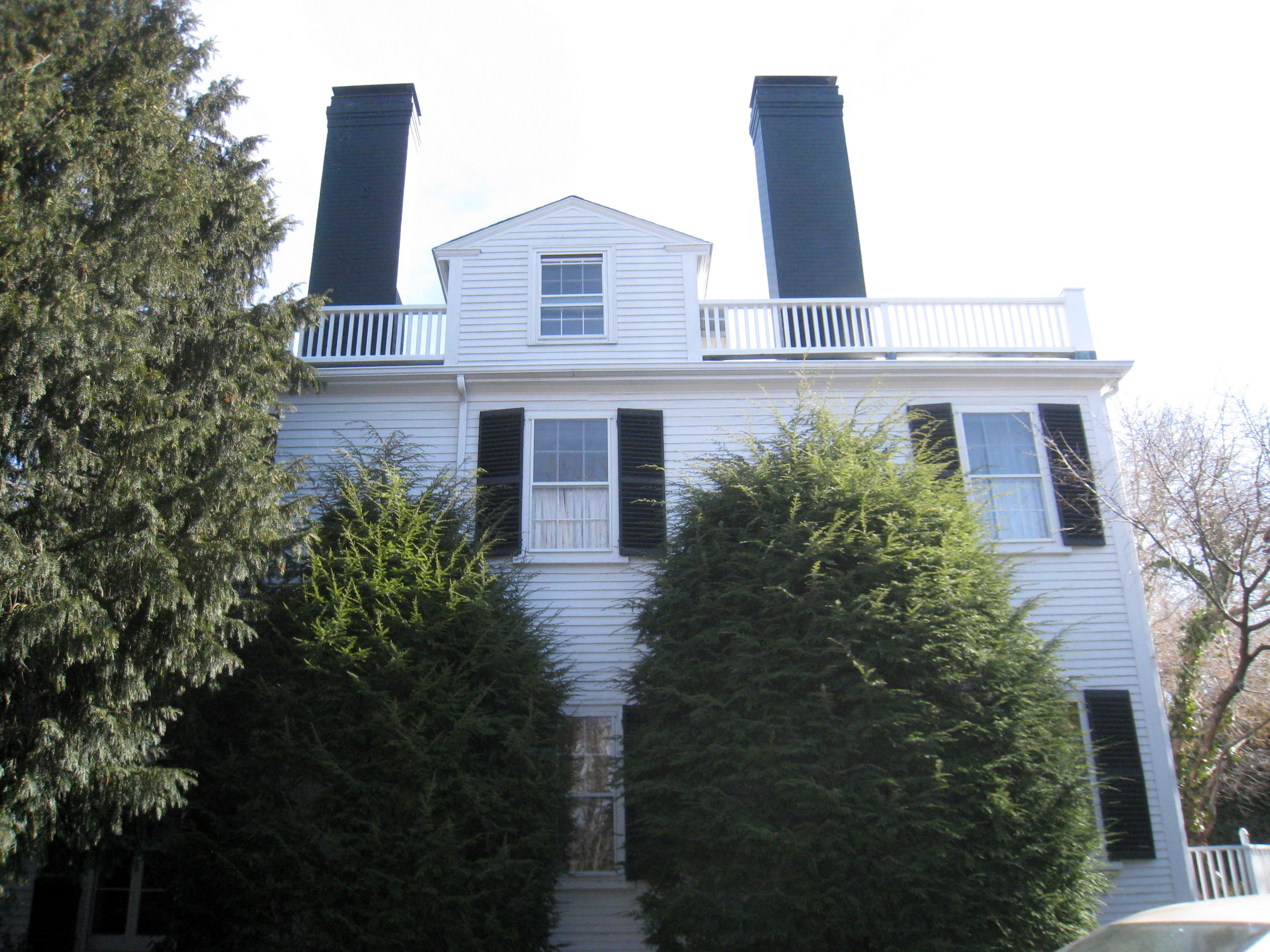

- Location within Massachusetts Location within the United States
- Location: Cambridge, Massachusetts
- Coordinates: 42°22′26.6″N 71°08′17.4″W
- Built: 1807
- Architectural style: Georgian
- MPS: Cambridge MRA
- NRHP reference No.: 83000822
- Added to NRHP: June 30, 1983

The Sarah Orne House is an historic house at 10 Coolidge Hill Road in Cambridge, Massachusetts. The oldest portion of this house was built in 1807 by John Orne, and originally functioned as a store. It was moved in 1809 and expanded into a house by Orne's mother Sarah. It is now a 2 1/2-story wood-frame structure, five bays wide, with a single-story porch spanning its front. The central window on the second floor has a rounded arch. The house was associated with the city's last working farm, which operated in the Coolidge Hill area. The former service wing of the house was separated from it in the 1930s, and now stands as a separate residence at 8 Coolidge Hill Road.

The house was listed on the National Register of Historic Places in 1983.

== See also ==
- National Register of Historic Places listings in Cambridge, Massachusetts
