= Anna Day House =

Historic house in Massachusetts, United States

- U.S. National Register of Historic Places
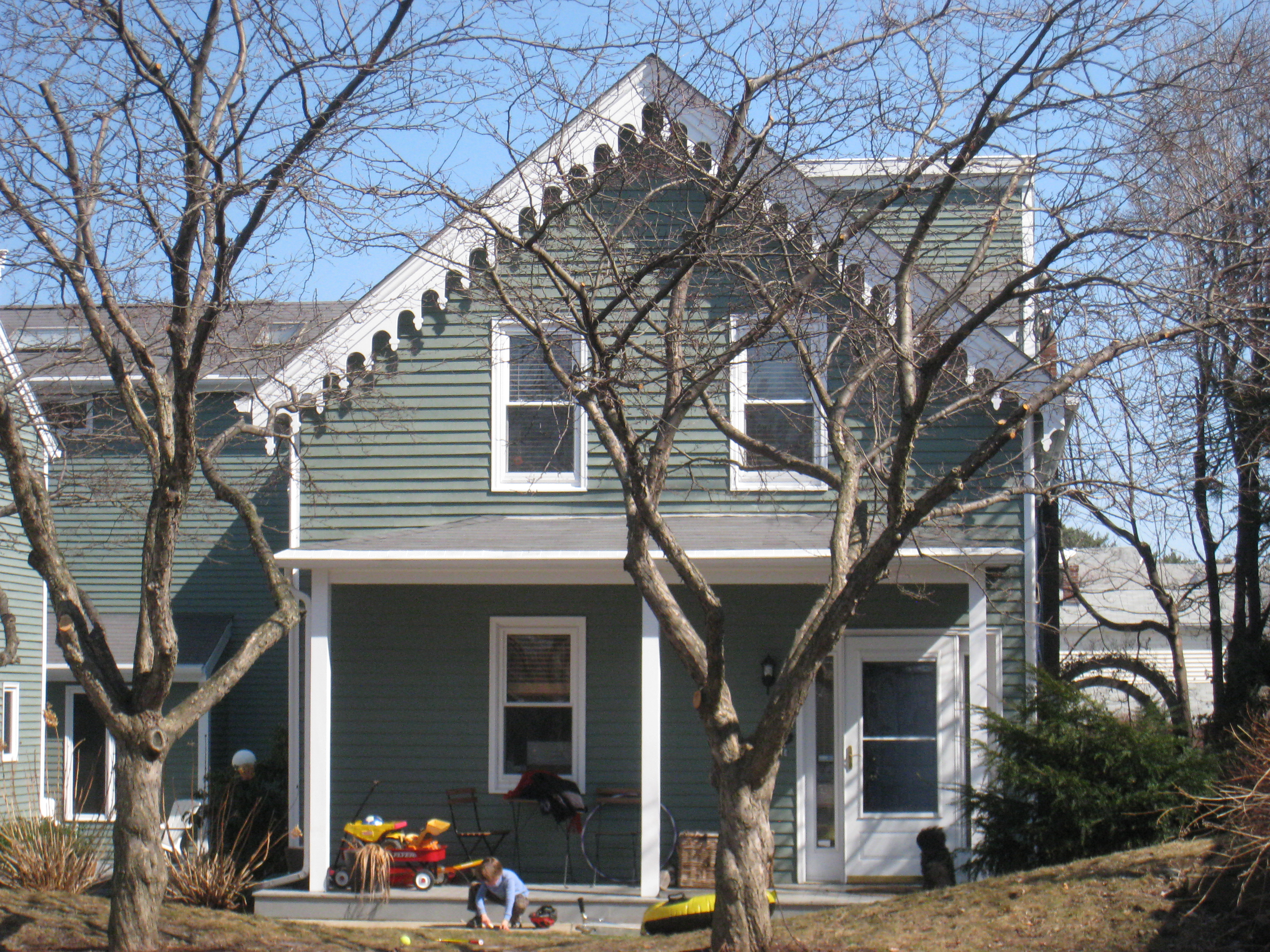

- Location within Massachusetts
- Location: 139 Cushing Street , Cambridge, Massachusetts
- Coordinates: 42°22′43″N 71°9′8″W
- Built: 1856
- Architectural style: Gothic Revival
- MPS: Cambridge MRA
- NRHP reference No.: 82001935
- Added to NRHP: April 13, 1982

The Anna Day House is an historic house in Cambridge, Massachusetts.

== Description ==
The 1 1/2-story wood-frame cottage was built in 1856, and is a well-preserved example of Gothic Revival styling. This instance in particular is notable for its drip-style bargeboard decoration. The house was built as part of the initial subdivision of the Strawberry Hill area. Other Gothic features, including finials on the gable and drip molding surrounding the windows, have been lost.

The house was listed on the National Register of Historic Places on April 13, 1982.

== See also ==
- National Register of Historic Places listings in Cambridge, Massachusetts
