= Isaac Fay House =

Historic house in Massachusetts, United States

- U.S. National Register of Historic Places
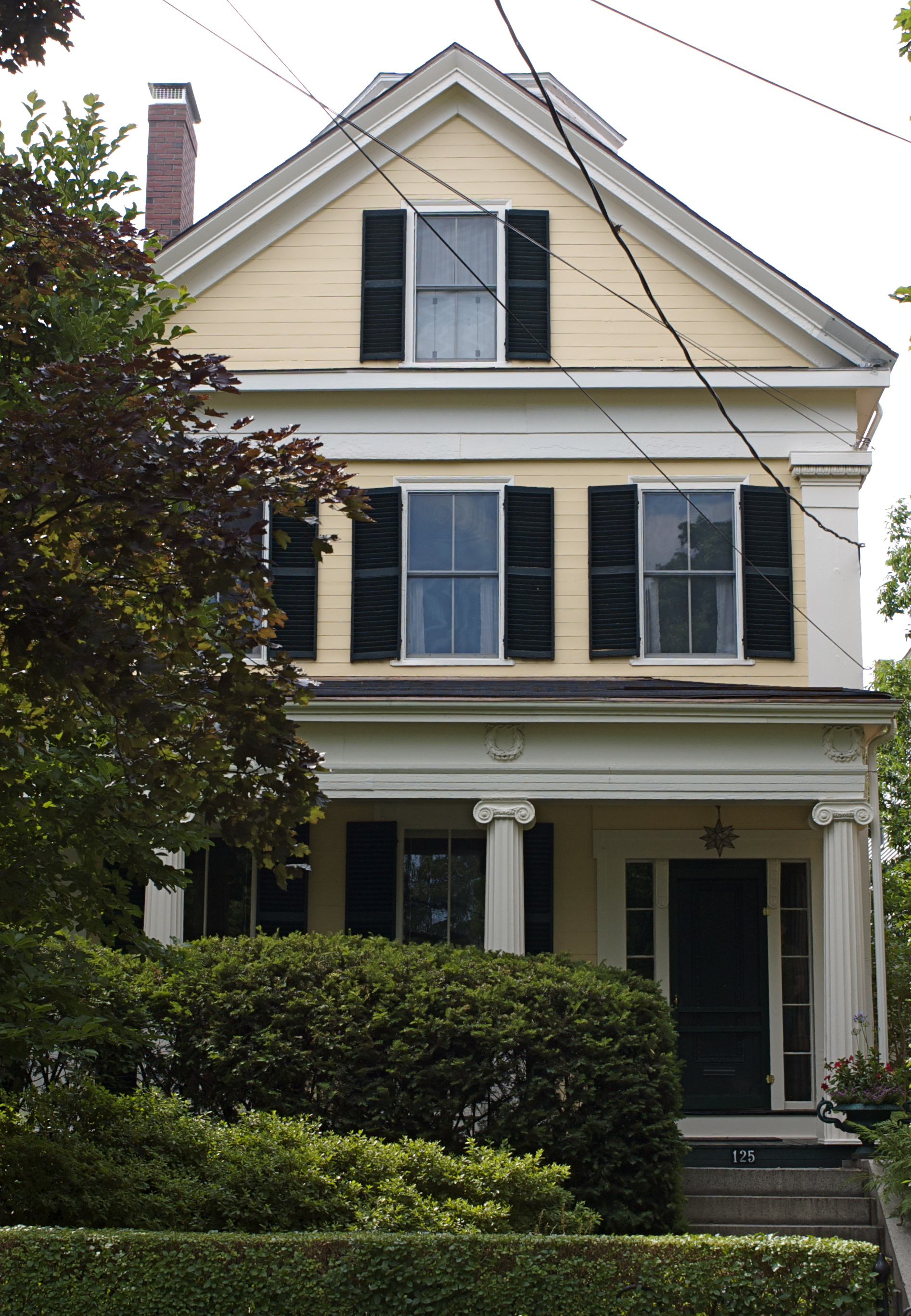

- Location within Massachusetts Location within the United States
- Location: Cambridge, Massachusetts
- Coordinates: 42°22′23.6″N 71°06′07.0″W
- Built: 1843
- Architectural style: Greek Revival
- MPS: Cambridge MRA
- NRHP reference No.: 83000799
- Added to NRHP: June 30, 1983

The Isaac Fay House is a historic house located at 125 Antrim Street in Cambridge, Massachusetts.

== Description and history ==
The 2 1/2-story wood-frame house was built in 1843, and is one of the city's best examples of a Greek Revival side-hall plan. It also has distinctive features, including a cupola and an Ionic wraparound porch, that are not found on any surviving period building in the city. The house was originally located on Fayette Street, and was moved to its present location in 1856. It belonged to Isaac Fay, a city alderman.

The house was listed on the National Register of Historic Places in 1983 (where it is misspelled as "Issac").

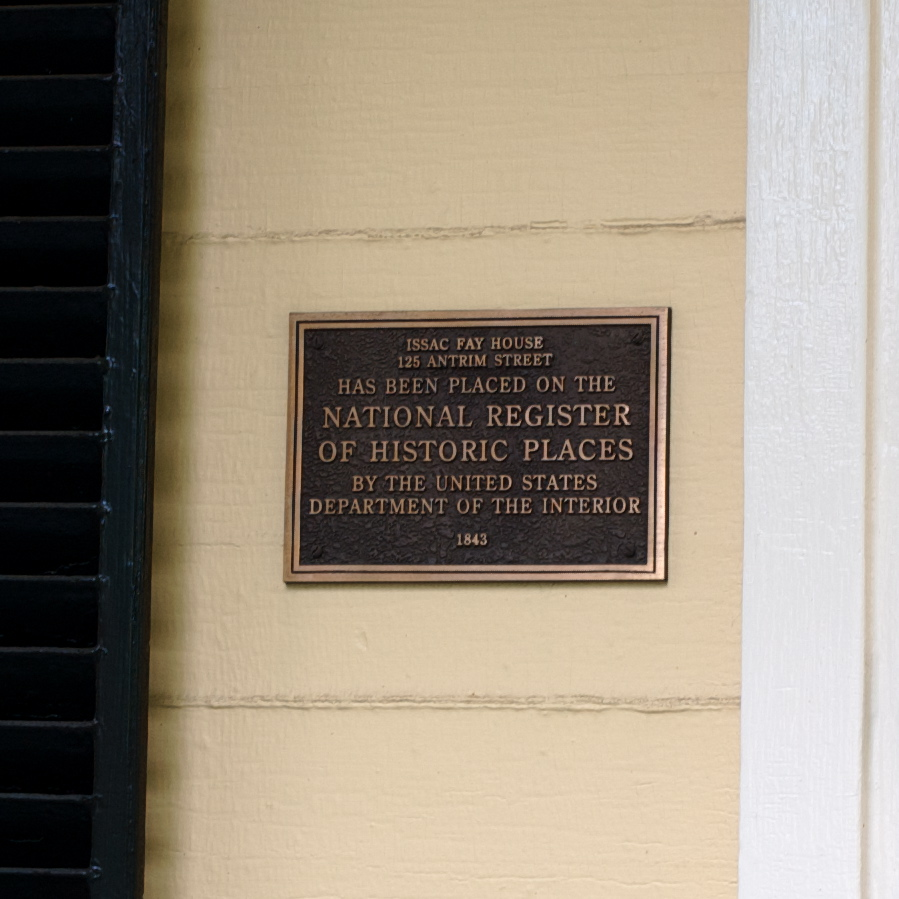
The NRHP plaque on the front of the Isaac Fay House.

== See also ==
- National Register of Historic Places listings in Cambridge, Massachusetts
