= Littlefield-Roberts House =

Historic house in Massachusetts, United States

- U.S. National Register of Historic Places
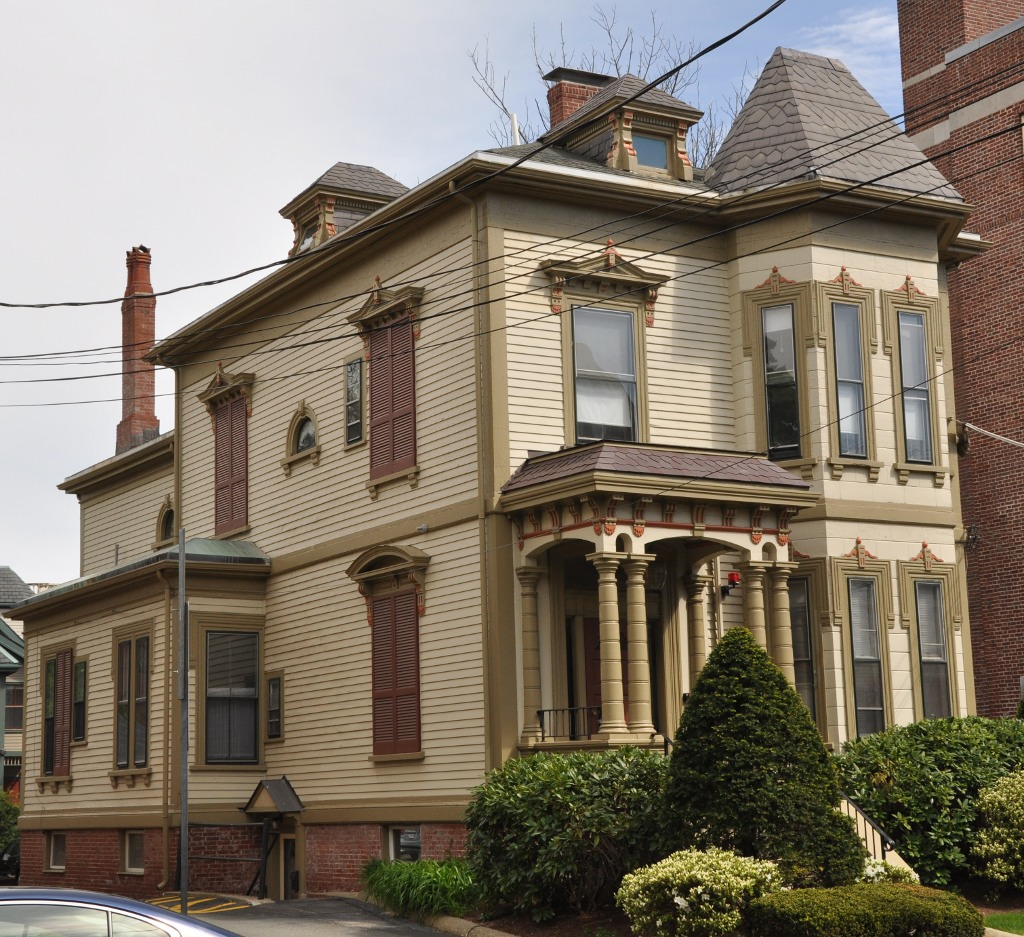

- Location within Massachusetts Location within the United States
- Location: 16 Prescott Street, Cambridge, Massachusetts
- Coordinates: 42°22′23″N 71°6′50″W
- Built: 1873
- Architect: Joseph Littlefield
- Architectural style: Second Empire
- MPS: Cambridge MRA
- NRHP reference No.: 86002070
- Added to NRHP: September 12, 1986

The Littlefield-Roberts House is a historic house located in Cambridge, Massachusetts.

== Description and history ==
The 2 1/2-story wood-frame house was built in 1873 by Joseph Littlefield, and is one of the finest late Second Empire houses in the city. The main facade has a heavily ornamented entry on the left, and a full-height projecting bay on the right that is capped by a polygonal roof. The roof is pierced by hip-roofed dormers whose windows have decorated surrounds.

The house was listed on the National Register of Historic Places on September 12, 1986.

== See also ==
- National Register of Historic Places listings in Cambridge, Massachusetts
