= Henderson Carriage Repository =

- U.S. National Register of Historic Places
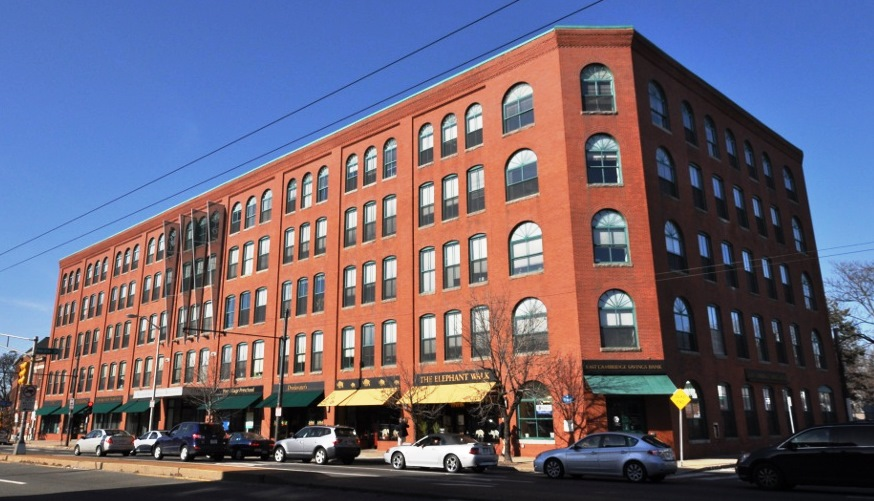

- Location within Massachusetts Location within the United States
- Location: Cambridge, Massachusetts
- Coordinates: 42°23′29.6″N 71°7′23.0″W
- Built: 1892
- Architect: Charles Park
- MPS: Cambridge MRA
- NRHP reference No.: 82001947
- Added to NRHP: April 13, 1982

The Henderson Carriage Repository is a historic building at 2067-2089 Massachusetts Avenue in Cambridge, Massachusetts. Located just outside Porter Square, the five story brick building was built in 1892 by the Henderson family of carriage makers, to a design by Charles Park. The building was primarily used as a storage facility for carriages, with its upper floors holding as many as 2000. It has since been converted for use as offices and retail businesses.

The building was listed on the National Register of Historic Places in 1982.

== See also ==
- National Register of Historic Places listings in Cambridge, Massachusetts
