= Norfolk Street Historic District =

Historic district in Massachusetts, United States

- U.S. National Register of Historic Places
- U.S. Historic district
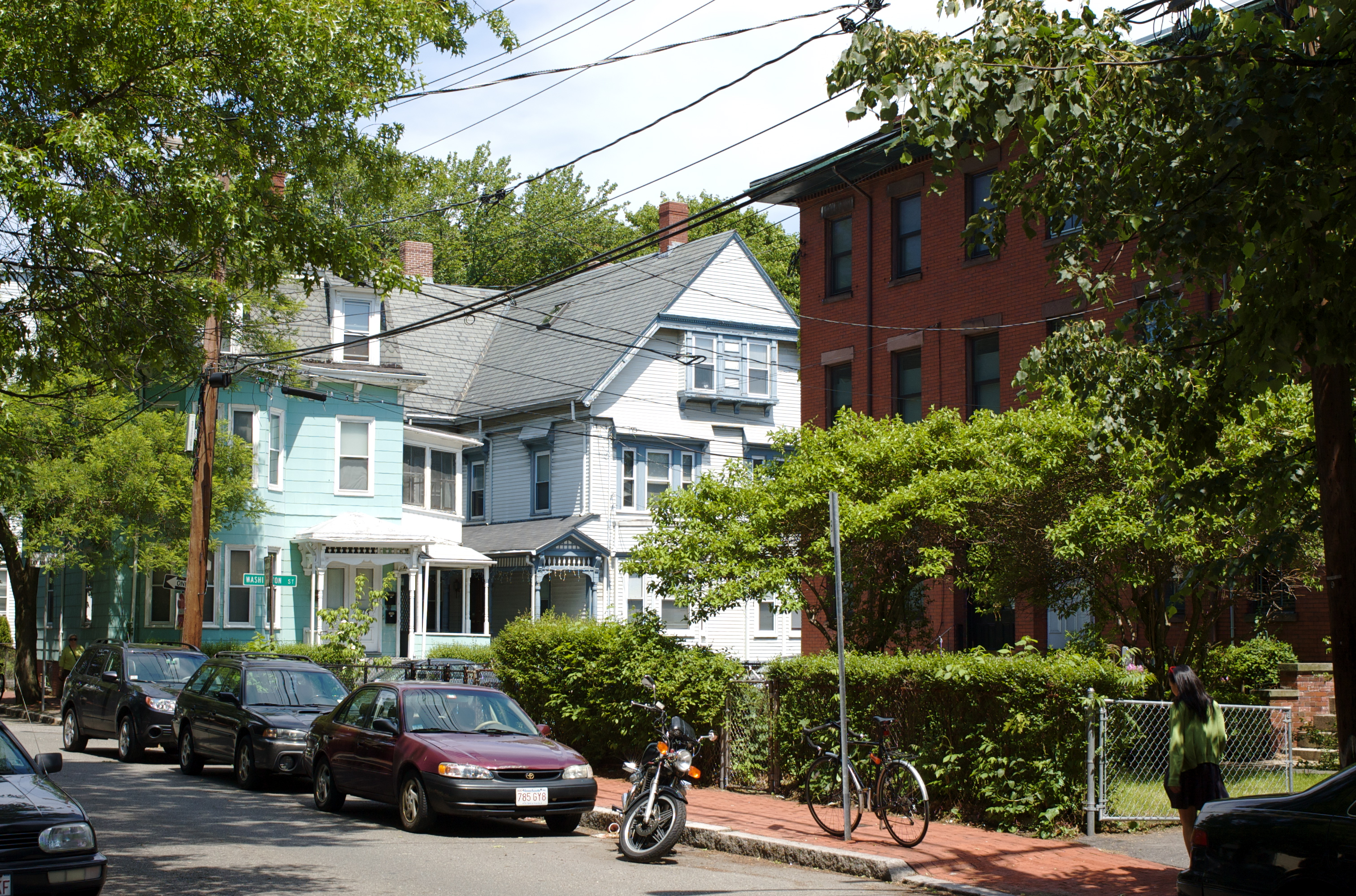

- Location within Massachusetts Location within the United States
- Location: Cambridge, Massachusetts
- Coordinates: 42°21′57″N 71°6′4″W
- Architect: James Fogerty et al.
- Architectural style: Greek Revival, Italianate, Queen Anne
- MPS: Cambridge MRA
- NRHP reference No.: 82001964
- Added to NRHP: April 13, 1982

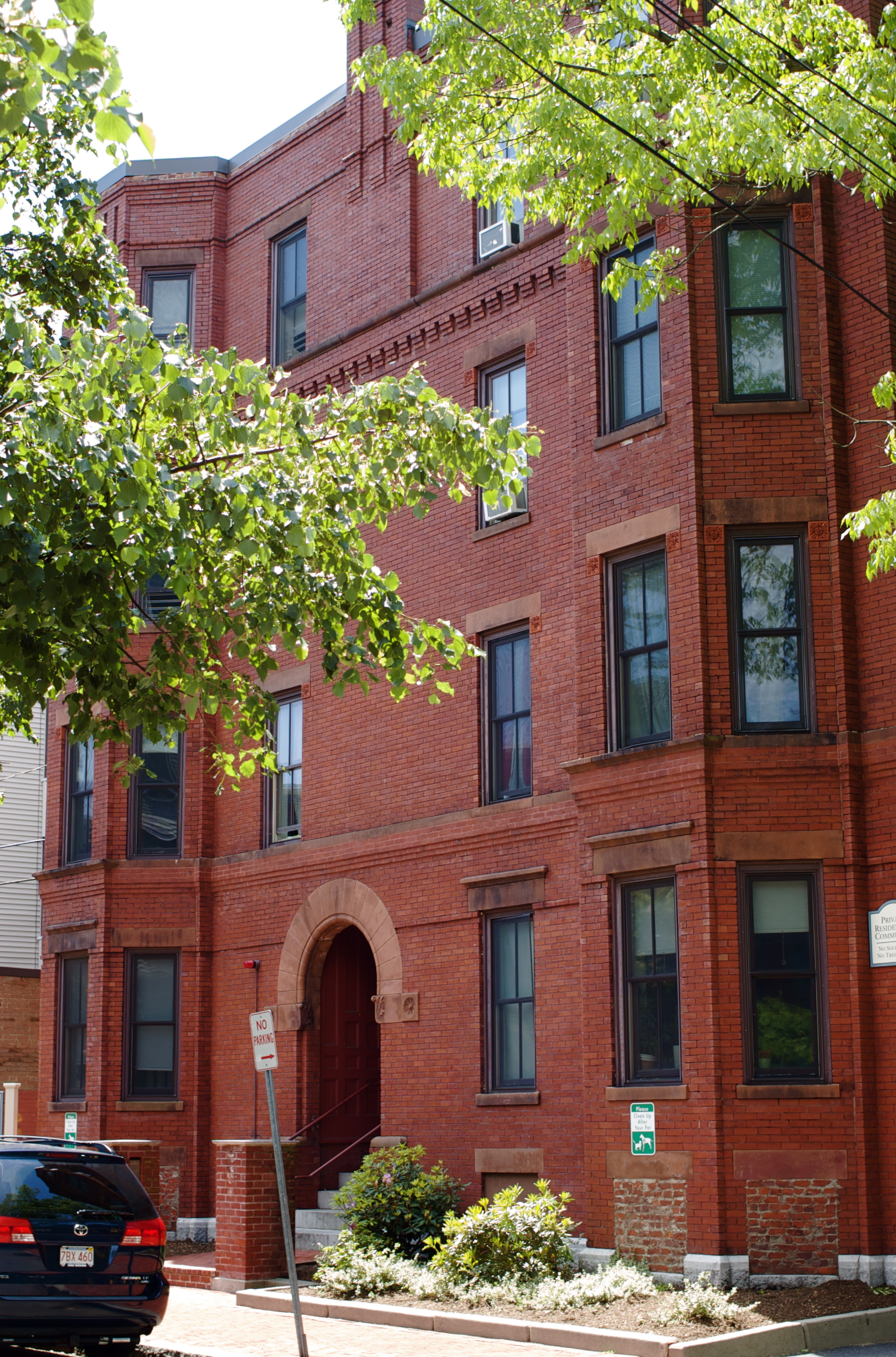

The Norfolk Street Historic District is a historic district at Norfolk Street between Suffolk and Bishop Allen Streets in Cambridge, Massachusetts. It encompasses two distinct phases of 19th century residential development in the city: a period in the 1840s when a series of Greek Revival cottages was built (on the odd-numbered side of the street), and the 1880s, when four-story "hotel" (apartment house) construction predominated (on the even-numbered side of the street). Many of the Greek Revival cottages have been altered, although that at 73 Norfolk is particularly well preserved. The district features works by James Fogerty and other local architects.

The district was added to the National Register of Historic Places in 1982.

== See also ==
- National Register of Historic Places listings in Cambridge, Massachusetts
