= Hiram Sands House =

Historic house in Massachusetts, United States

- U.S. National Register of Historic Places
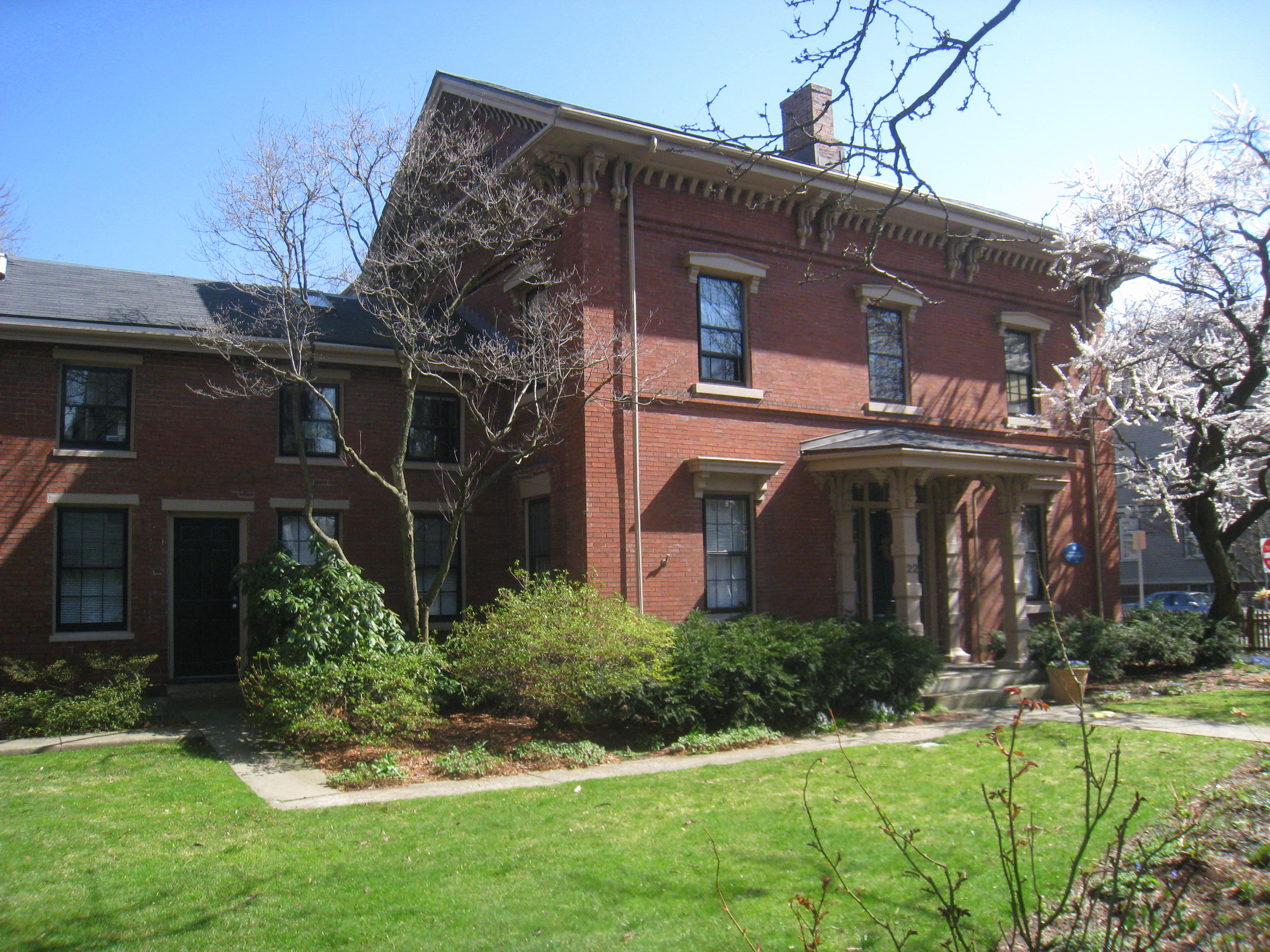

- Location within Massachusetts Location within the United States
- Location: 22 Putnam Avenue, Cambridge, Massachusetts
- Coordinates: 42°22′09.9″N 71°06′47.5″W
- Built: 1848
- Architectural style: Greek Revival, Italianate
- NRHP reference No.: 76000238
- Added to NRHP: April 30, 1976

The Hiram Sands House is an historic house in Cambridge, Massachusetts. It is a 2 1/2-story brick structure, three bays wide, with a side-gable roof. Its gable ends are fully pedimented in the Greek Revival style, but the heavy brackets and modillions on the cornice are Italianate features, as are the window hoods and front porch. The house was built in 1848 by the second of three generations of Cambridge brickmakers, from clay dug nearby, and incorporates elements of both the Greek Revival and Italianate architectural styles. It was added to the National Register of Historic Places in 1976.

== See also ==
- National Register of Historic Places listings in Cambridge, Massachusetts
