= Jones Hill =

Jones Hill may refer to:

- Jones Hill, Queensland, a place in Australia
- Jones Hill Wood, in Buckinghamshire, England
- Jones Hill, Pennville, Indiana, U.S.
- Jones Hill (Massachusetts), a mountain in Dukes County, Massachusetts, U.S.
- Jones Hill, early name of Avon Hill Historic District, Cambridge, Massachusetts, U.S.
- Jones Hill, a neighborhood of Dorchester, Boston, Massachusetts, U.S.
- Jones Hill (Daniels County, Montana), a mountain in Daniels County, Montana, U.S.
- Jones Hill (Stillwater County, Montana), a mountain in Stillwater County, Montana, U.S.
- Jones Hill, an elevation near Columbia, New York, U.S.
- Jones Hill, an elevation near the Labrador Hollow Unique Area, New York, U.S.
- Jones Hill, Jamestown, New York, U.S.
- Jones Hill, early name of Corolla, North Carolina, U.S.
- Jones Hill Summit (Morrow County, Oregon), a mountain pass in Oregon, U.S.

== See also ==
- W. J. Hill (William Jones Hill, 1834–1888), an English actor, singer and comedian
- John Paul Jones hill, highest point of Guantanamo Bay Naval Base, Cuba
