= Hartwell and Richardson =

American architectural firm

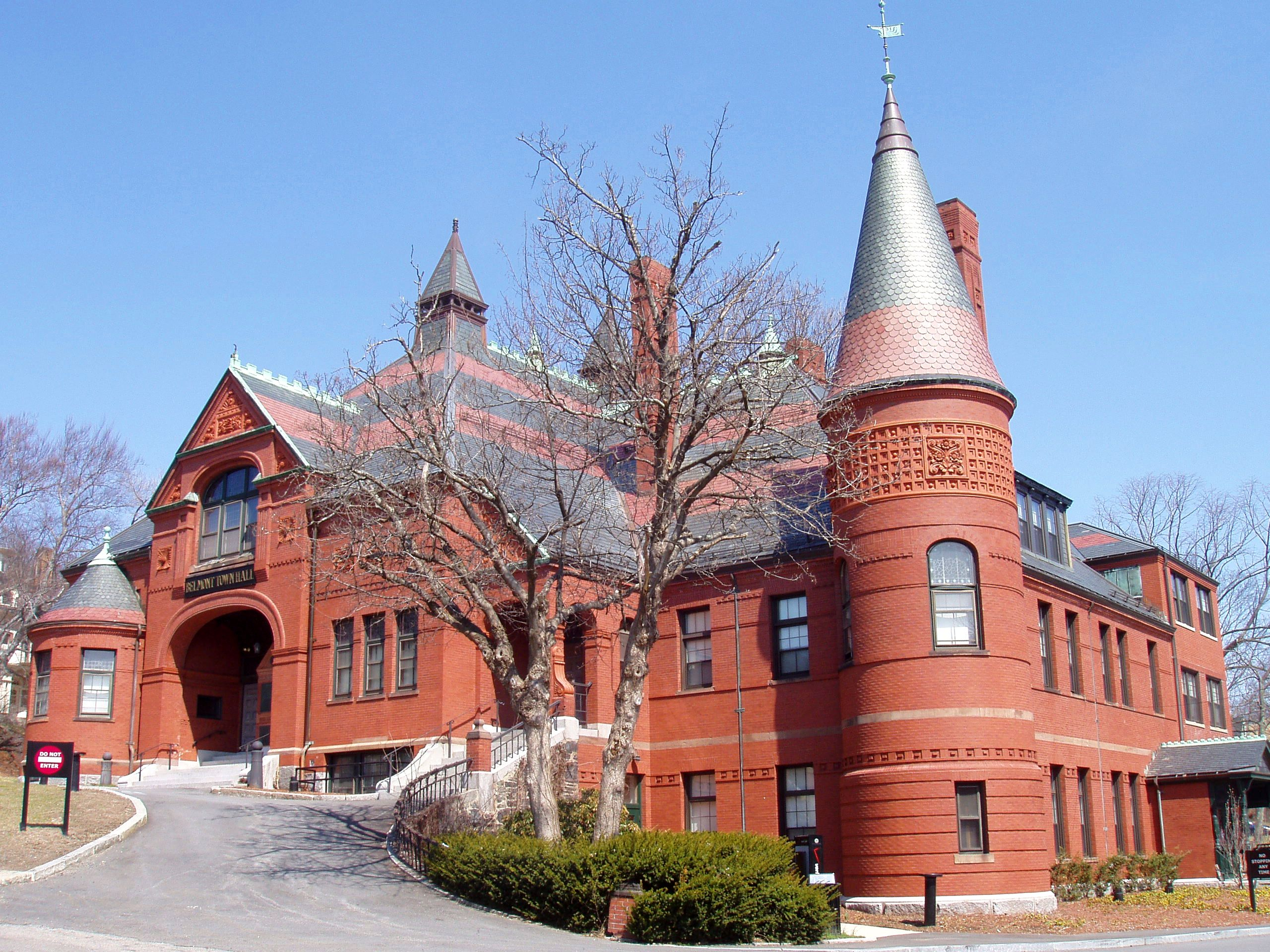
Belmont Town Hall (1881), Belmont, Massachusetts.

Hartwell and Richardson was a Boston, Massachusetts architectural firm established in 1881, by Henry Walker Hartwell (1833–1919) and William Cummings Richardson (1854–1935). The firm contributed significantly to the current building stock and architecture of the greater Boston area. Many of its buildings are listed on the National Register of Historic Places.

== History ==
Hartwell was the son of Boston painter Alonzo Hartwell. He did not attend college, and apprenticed with the architects Joseph E. and Hammatt Billings – (Billings & Billings). He opened his own office in 1856, and was one of the founding members of the Boston Society of Architects. He served in Company A of the 44th Regiment Massachusetts Volunteer Infantry during the American Civil War. In the late 1860s, he began a partnership with Albert E. Swasey, Jr. – Hartwell & Swasey – that lasted until 1877. He briefly paired with George Thomas Tilden, before beginning the partnership with Richardson.

Richardson, twenty years younger than Hartwell, studied architecture at the Massachusetts Institute of Technology. He won the Boston Society of Architects' 1875 prize as best young architect, and worked on his own until the 1881 partnership. Richardson was the principal designer in the firm, and Hartwell took care of the engineering and oversaw construction.

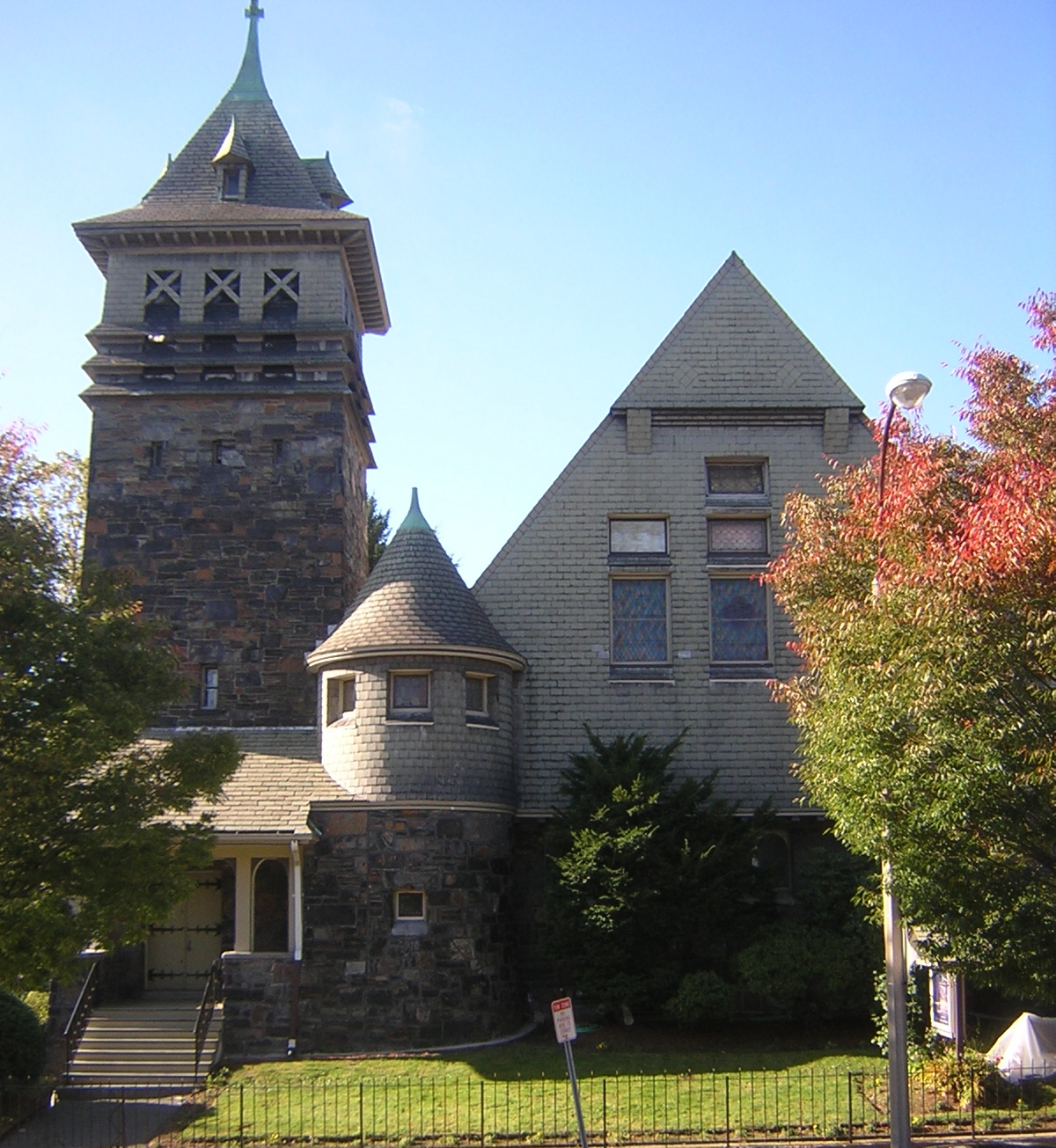
Broadway Winter Hill Congregational Church (1890), Somerville, Massachusetts.

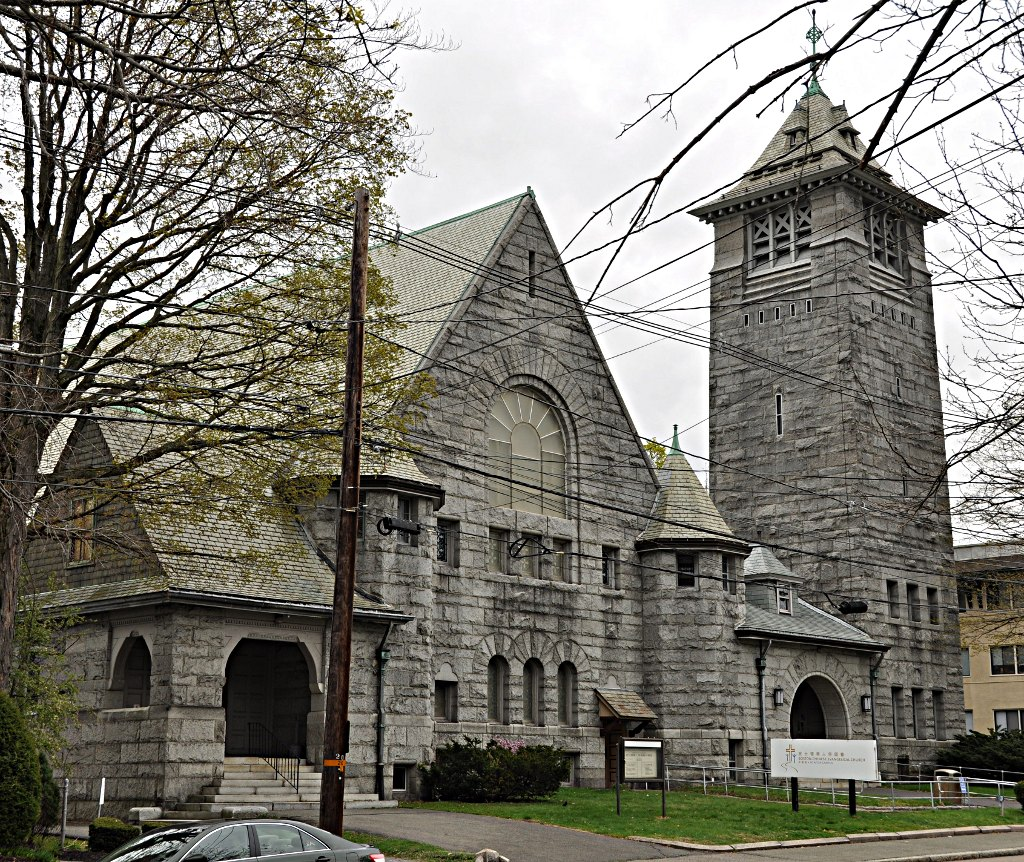
Central Congregational Church (1895), Newton, Massachusetts.

The firm's clients tended to be successful businessmen, rather than Boston "society." Early on, the firm specialized in churches and municipal buildings. First Baptist Church (1881) in Cambridge, Massachusetts and Town Hall (1881) in Belmont, Massachusetts, both completed in the first year of the partnership, probably were Hartwell's designs. Richardson's polychromy added lightness to Christ Church (1882) in Andover, Massachusetts and the First Spiritual Temple (1885) in Boston, Massachusetts. Even in informal styles such as the Queen Anne or Shingle-Style, that allowed for enormous freedom, Richardson's designs were conservative, sometimes even symmetrical, but beautifully detailed. Of particular note is a cluster of distinguished 1880s houses in the Avon Hill neighborhood of Cambridge.

The firm's grandest surviving house is "Osgood Hill" (1886), the Moses T. Stevens estate in North Andover, Massachusetts. Here, Richardson closely followed H. H. Richardson, for both the red-sandstone, Romanesque-Revival mansion and the rustic gatehouse. The 153-acre estate is now a wedding and conference center.

Two of the firm's churches offer a direct contrast: The Broadway Winter Hill Congregational Church (1890) in Somerville, Massachusetts is an informal, Shingle-Style composition. The Central Congregational Church (1895) in Newton, Massachusetts, composed of similar elements, is a more formal, Romanesque-Revival building, that would be symmetrical, absent the adjacent tower. Each probably reflected the wishes of the client, but they demonstrate that Richardson was accomplished in a range of styles.

In 1895, with the addition of English architect James Driver (1859–1923), the firm became Hartwell, Richardson and Driver, and continued under that name until Driver's retirement in 1921. The name reverted to Hartwell and Richardson, even though Hartwell had died in 1919, and the firm continued until Richardson's death in 1935.

In the 20th century, public schools and the occasional commercial building comprised much of the firm's output. At least six of their high school buildings have been converted into apartments or condominiums.

Hartwell and Richardson were both Fellows of the American Institute of Architects. Driver was a member of the AIA.

== Selected works ==
=== Churches ===
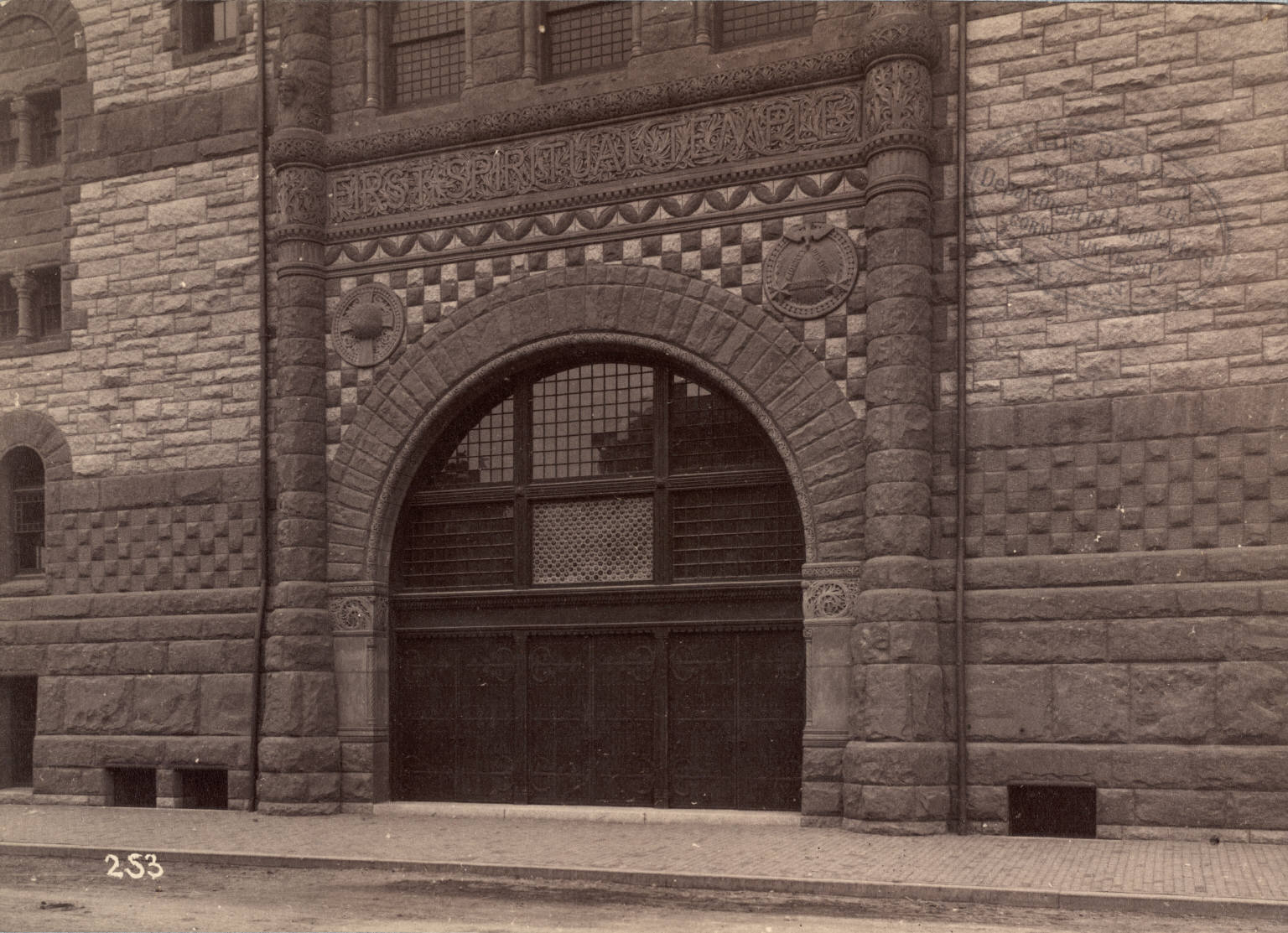
Entrance to First Spiritual Temple (1885), Boston, Massachusetts.

- First Baptist Church (1881), Cambridge, Massachusetts. NRHP-listed.
- Christ Church (1882), 29 Central Street, Andover, Massachusetts. A contributing property in Central Street District.
- First Spiritual Temple (1885), 26 Exeter Street, Boston, Massachusetts. Became the Exeter Street Theatre.
- Broadway Winter Hill Congregational Church (1890), Somerville, Massachusetts. NRHP-listed.
- First Parish Congregational Church (1890, rebuilt after 1912 fire), Wakefield, Massachusetts.
- First Unitarian Church (1893), Belmont, Massachusetts.
- Central Congregational Church (1895), Newton, Massachusetts. NRHP-listed.
- First Parish Church in Plymouth (1897–99), Plymouth, Massachusetts; Hartwell, Richardson & Driver.
- Rockdale Congregational Church (1898–99), 42 Fowler Road, Northbridge, Massachusetts; Hartwell, Richardson & Driver.
- First Unitarian Church, (1875–99), 130 Highland Avenue in Somerville, Massachusetts

=== Schools and libraries ===
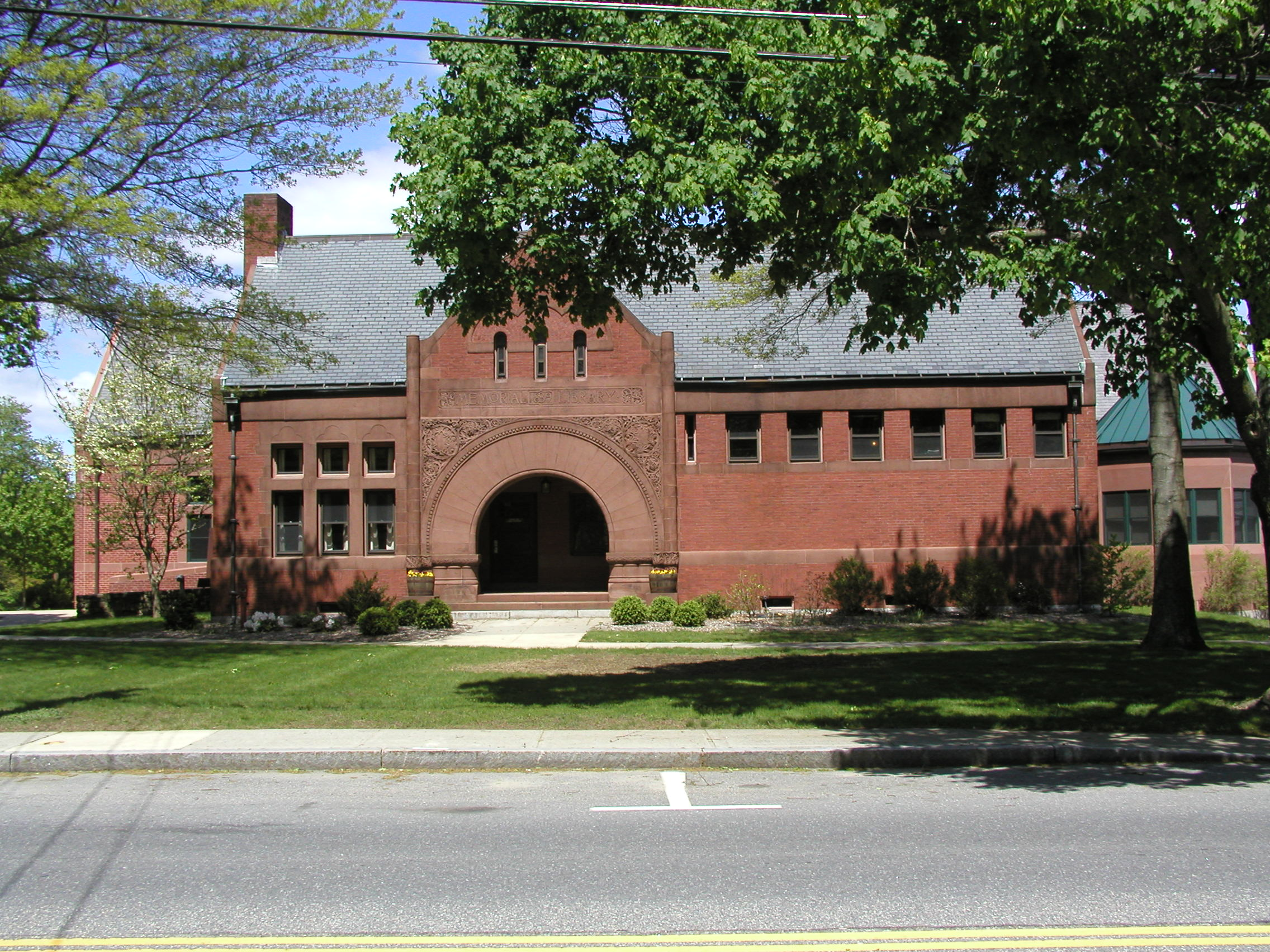
Acton Memorial Library (1889–91), Acton, Massachusetts.

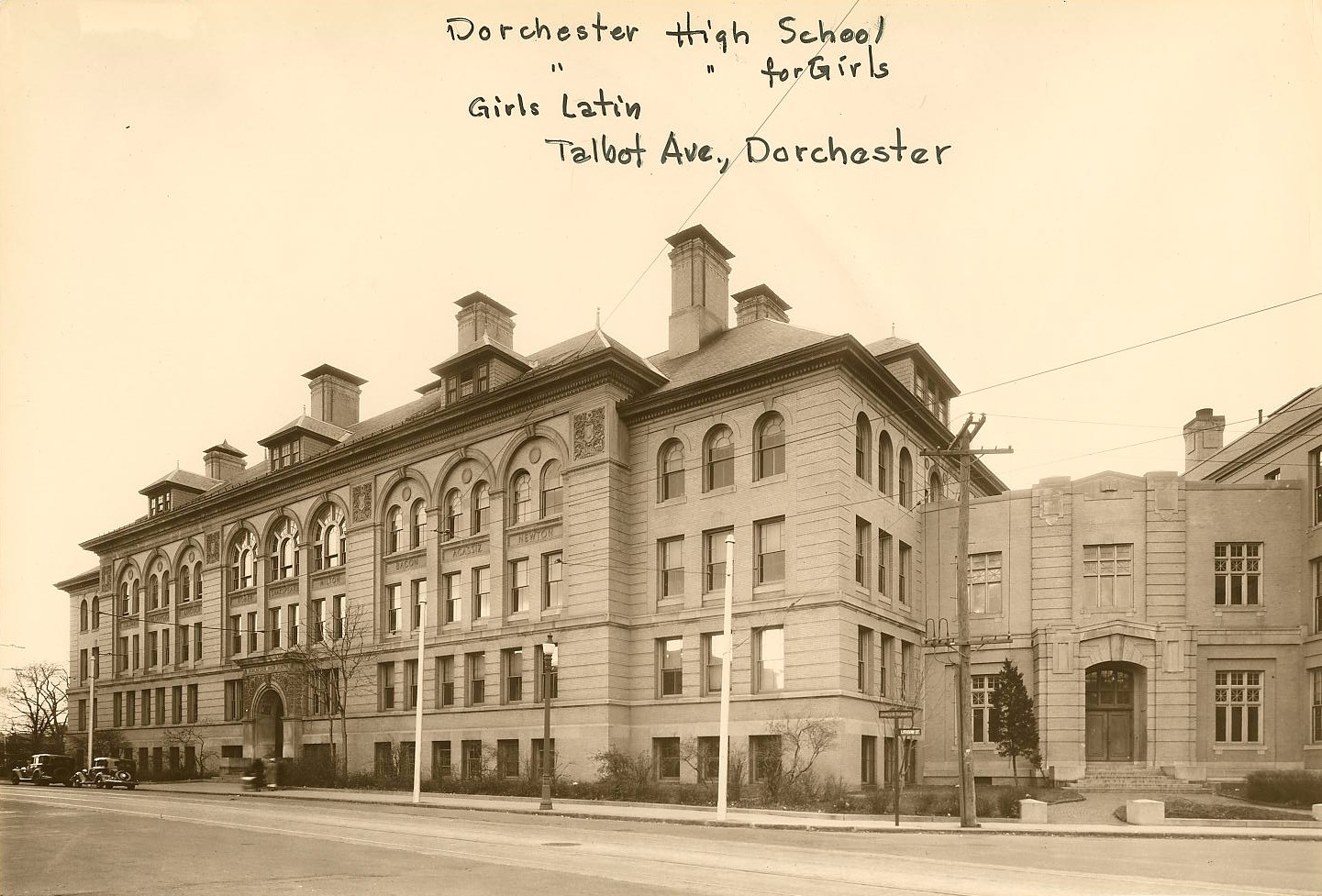
Dorchester Latin High School (1900), Boston, Massachusetts.

- Medford High School (1884–86), 48-64 Forest Street, Medford, Massachusetts. NRHP-listed. Now Old Medford High Condominiums.
- Draper Hall Dormitory (1888–90), Abbot Academy, Andover, Massachusetts. Abbot Academy merged with Phillips Academy.
- State Normal Art School (1889, demolished), 68 Devonshire Street, Boston, Massachusetts. Hartwell and Richardson had their offices in this building.
- Acton Memorial Library (1889–91), 486 Main Street, Acton, Massachusetts. A contributing property in Acton Centre Historic District.
- Hancock School (1891), 33 Forest Street, Lexington, Massachusetts. NRHP-listed. Now Hancock Condominiums.
- Arlington High School (1893–94), 27 Maple Street, Arlington, Massachusetts. Now Arlington Senior Center.
- Wellesley High School (1894), 324 Washington Street, Wellesley Hills, Massachusetts. NRHP-listed. Now Phillips Park Apartments for senior citizens.
- Hyde School (1895), Lincoln Street, Newton Highlands. Converted to condominiums after a fire in 1981.
- Somerville High School (1895-2021), 81 Highland Avenue, Somerville, Massachusetts; Hartwell, Richardson & Driver. NRHP-listed.
- State Normal School (1898, demolished), Howe & Oak Streets, New Haven, Connecticut; Hartwell, Richardson & Driver.
- Springfield Classical High School (1898), Springfield, Massachusetts; Hartwell, Richardson & Driver. Now Classical Condominiums.
- Newton Classical High School (1898–99, demolished 1973), Walnut Street, Newtonville, Massachusetts; Hartwell, Richardson & Driver.
- Trenton High School (1899–1900), Chestnut & Hamilton Avenues, Trenton, New Jersey; Hartwell, Richardson & Driver.
- Cambridge Latin School (1900, demolished 1980), Broadway, Cambridge, Massachusetts; Hartwell, Richardson & Driver.
- Dorchester Latin High School (1900), Talbot Avenue & Centre Street, Boston, Massachusetts; Hartwell, Richardson & Driver. The firm also designed the 1910 addition. Now Latin Academy Apartments.
- McKeen Memorial Hall (1903–04), Abbot Academy, Andover, Massachusetts; Hartwell, Richardson & Driver.
- Manchester High School (1904), 1146 Main Street, Manchester, Connecticut; Hartwell, Richardson & Driver. Now Bennet Apartments for senior citizens.
- Leominster Public Library (1906–10), 30 West Street, Leominster, Massachusetts; Hartwell, Richardson & Driver. A Carnegie library.
- Killingly High School (1908), Killingly, Connecticut; Hartwell, Richardson & Driver. NRHP-listed.
- Laundry, Abbot Academy (1913–14), Andover, Massachusetts; Hartwell, Richardson & Driver.
- Oakdale Elementary School, 147 Cedar Street, Dedham, Massachusetts.

=== Institutional buildings ===
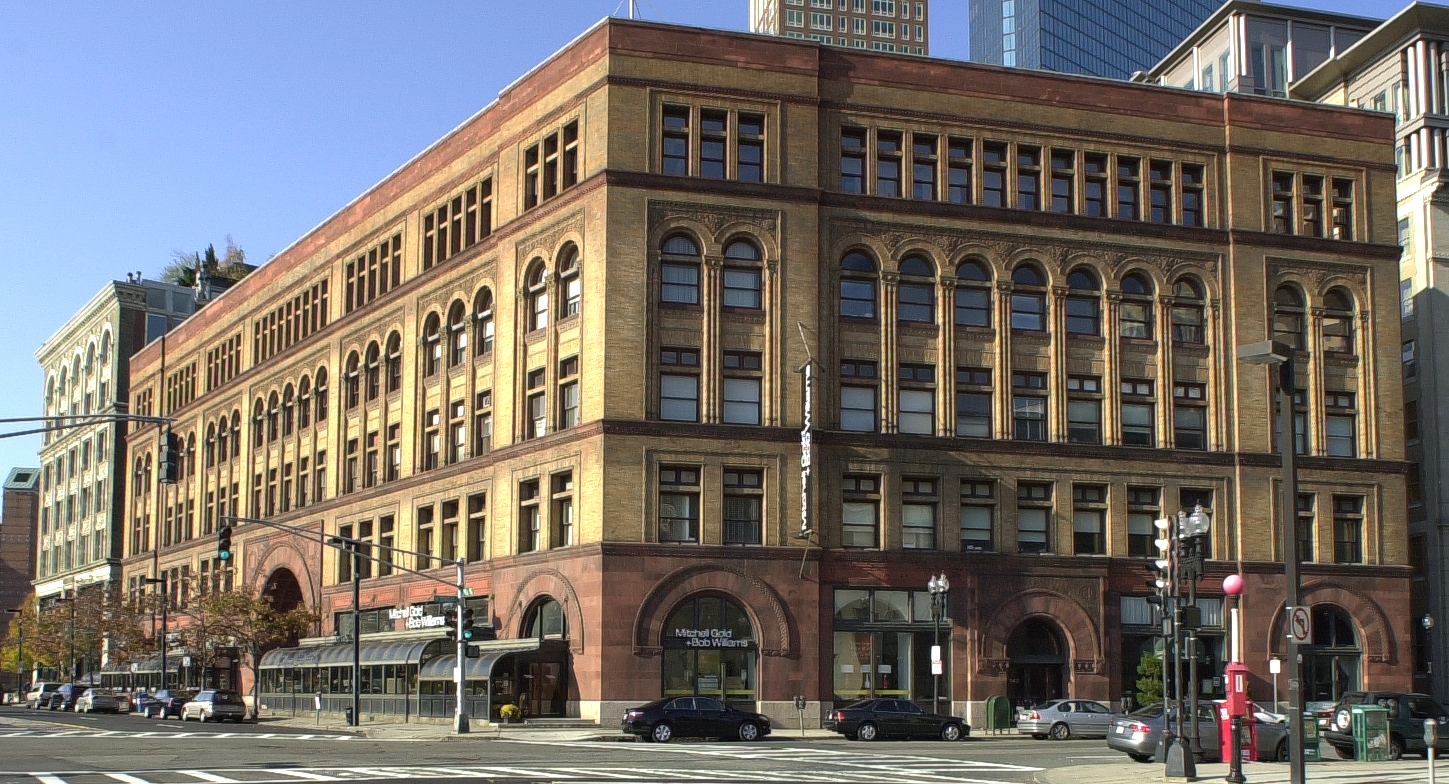
Youth's Companion Building (1892), Boston, Massachusetts.

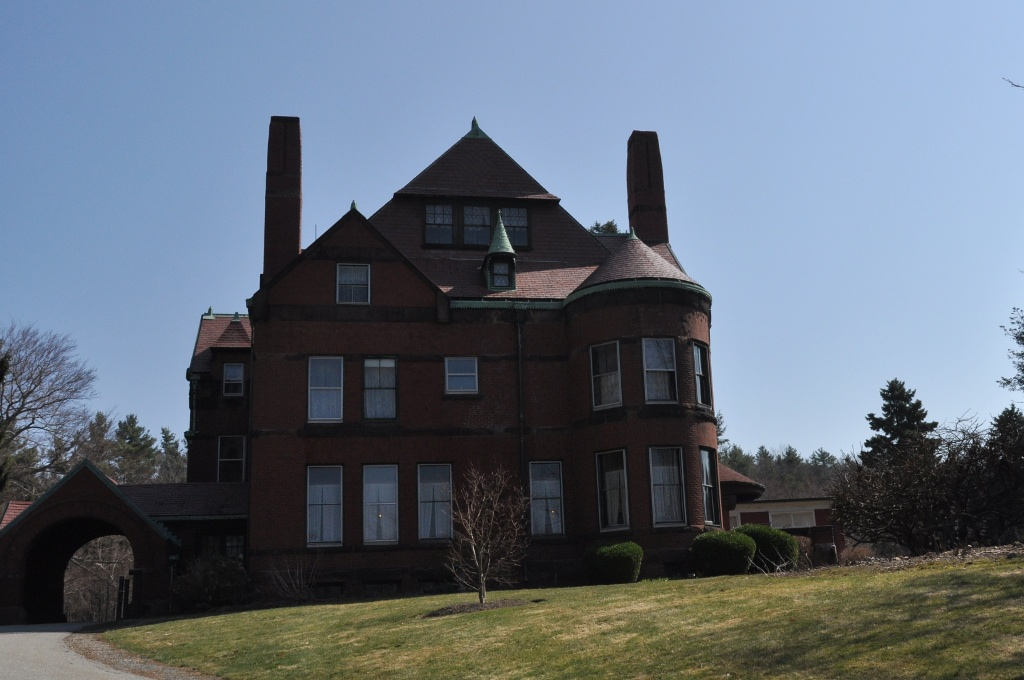
"Osgood Hill" (1886), North Andover, Massachusetts.

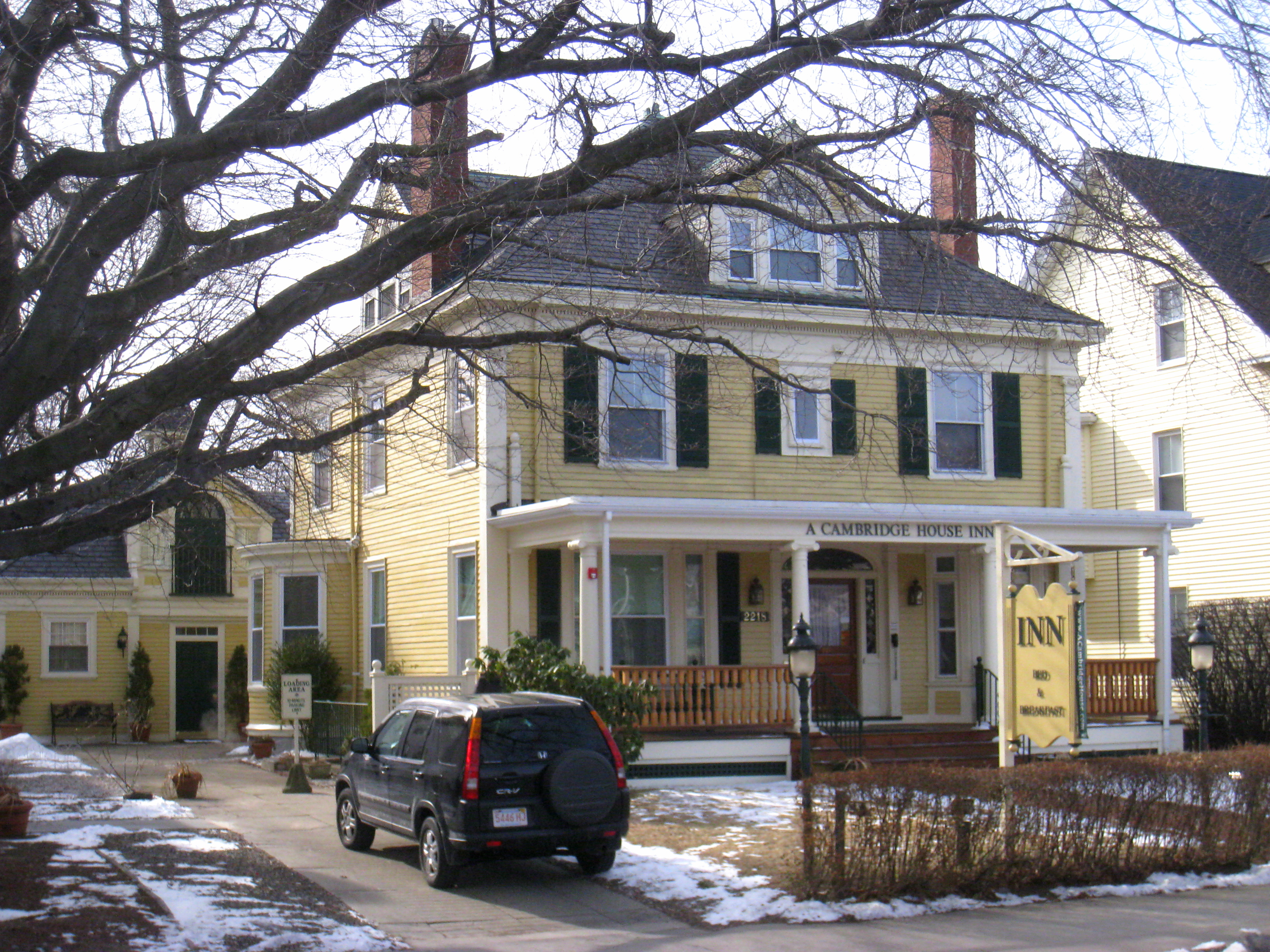
Isaac McLean House (1894), Cambridge, Massachusetts.

- Belmont Town Hall (1881), Belmont, Massachusetts. Part of the Pleasant Street Historic District.
- Odd Fellows Hall (1884), Cambridge, Massachusetts. NRHP-listed.
- Ware Town Hall (1885), Ware, Massachusetts. NRHP-listed.
- Westfield Municipal Building (1889–92), Westfield, Massachusetts. NRHP-listed.
- Andover National Bank (1890), 23 Main Street, Andover, Massachusetts. NRHP-listed.
- Newton Club (1891), Newtonville, Massachusetts.
- Masonic Building (1891, burned 1906), Dover, New Hampshire.
- New England Shoe and Leather Association Building (1891, demolished), 166 Essex Street, Boston, Massachusetts.
- Youth's Companion Building (1892), 209 Columbus Avenue, Boston, Massachusetts. NRHP-listed.
- Dedham Institution for Savings (1892), 601-603 High Street, Dedham, Massachusetts
- Newton Cottage Hospital (1894), 2014 Washington Street, Newton, Massachusetts. NRHP-listed.
- The Refectory (1895), Refectory Hill, Franklin Park, Boston, Massachusetts.
- Taylor Building (1895), Essex & Columbia Streets, Boston, Massachusetts.
- YMCA (1896), 820 Massachusetts Avenue, Cambridge, Massachusetts; Hartwell, Richardson & Driver.
- Masonic Building (1896), Newton, Massachusetts; Hartwell, Richardson & Driver. NRHP-listed.
- Carney Building (1902–04, demolished), 39-43 Tremont Street, Boston, Massachusetts; Hartwell, Richardson & Driver.
- Waltham Savings Bank (1905), Waltham, Massachusetts; Hartwell, Richardson & Driver.
- Company F State Armory (1909), Waltham, Massachusetts; Hartwell, Richardson & Driver. NRHP-listed.

=== Residences ===
- Alterations to Lyman Estate (1882–83), Waltham, Massachusetts.
- "Seven Gables," Francis Henry Hastings House (1885), 190 North Avenue, Weston, Massachusetts. Shingle-Style. A contributing property in Kendal Green Historic District.
- Henry O. Underwood House (1885), 100 Common Street, Belmont, Massachusetts. Shingle-Style.
- "Osgood Hill," Moses T. Stevens House (1886), 723 Osgood Street, North Andover, Massachusetts. NRHP-listed.
- Avon Hill Historic District:
  - 33 Washington Avenue, Cambridge, Massachusetts. Shingle-Style.
  - Stillman F. Kelley House (1887), 49 Washington Avenue, Cambridge, Massachusetts.
  - Yerxa-Field House (1887–88), 37 Lancaster Street, Cambridge, Massachusetts. Shingle-Style.
  - David Ritchie House (1889), 26 Washington Avenue, Cambridge, Massachusetts.
- Pill Hill Historic District:
  - Ernest Bowditch House, 446 Walnut Street, Brookline, Massachusetts. Shingle-Style.
  - 62 Upland Road (1890), Brookline, Massachusetts. Shingle-Style.
  - 107 Upland Road (1892), Brookline, Massachusetts.
- Dr. W. B. Parker House (1886–88, altered), 248 Marlborough Street, Boston, Massachusetts. One of the twin front doors led to Parker's residence, the other to his dentist's office. The right front door has been bricked over.
- J. A. Wood House (1888), 3 Sacramento Street, Cambridge, Massachusetts. Shingle-Style. NRHP-listed.
- Thomas E. Proctor House (1893), 273 Commonwealth Avenue, Boston, Massachusetts. A 4-story, Neoclassical, double-width city house.
- Isaac McLean House (1894), 2218 Massachusetts Avenue, Cambridge, Massachusetts. NRHP listed. Now A Cambridge House Inn.
- Silas Peavy House (1905), 300 Kent Street, Brookline, Massachusetts; Hartwell, Richardson & Driver.
- Charles Phelps House (1905), 1 Ellington Avenue, Rockville, Connecticut; Hartwell, Richardson & Driver.
- Charles Winship House (1907), 13 Mansion Road, Wakefield, Massachusetts; Hartwell, Richardson & Driver. Interiors by A. H. Davenport and Company. NRHP listed.
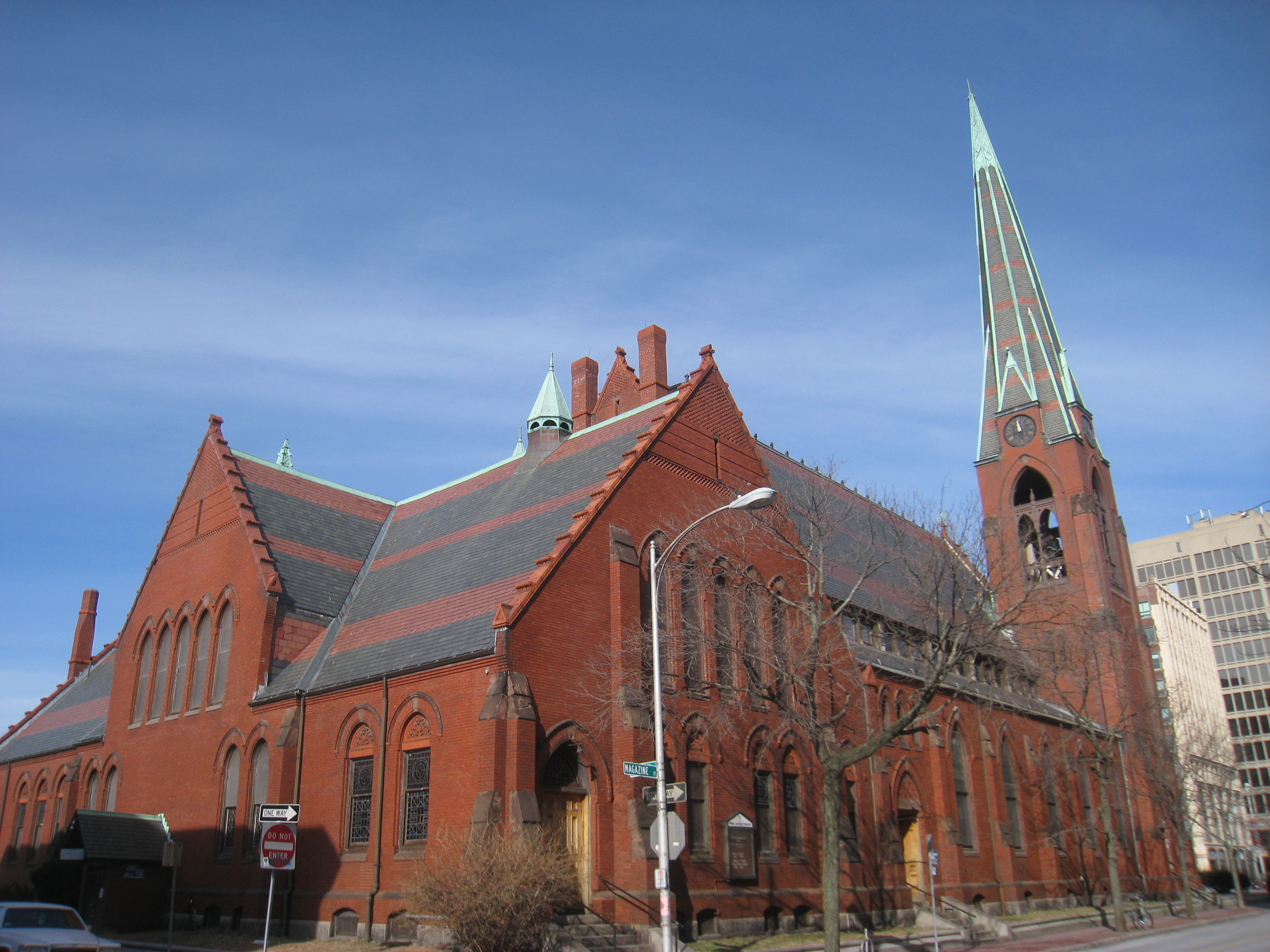
First Baptist Church (1881), Cambridge, Massachusetts.

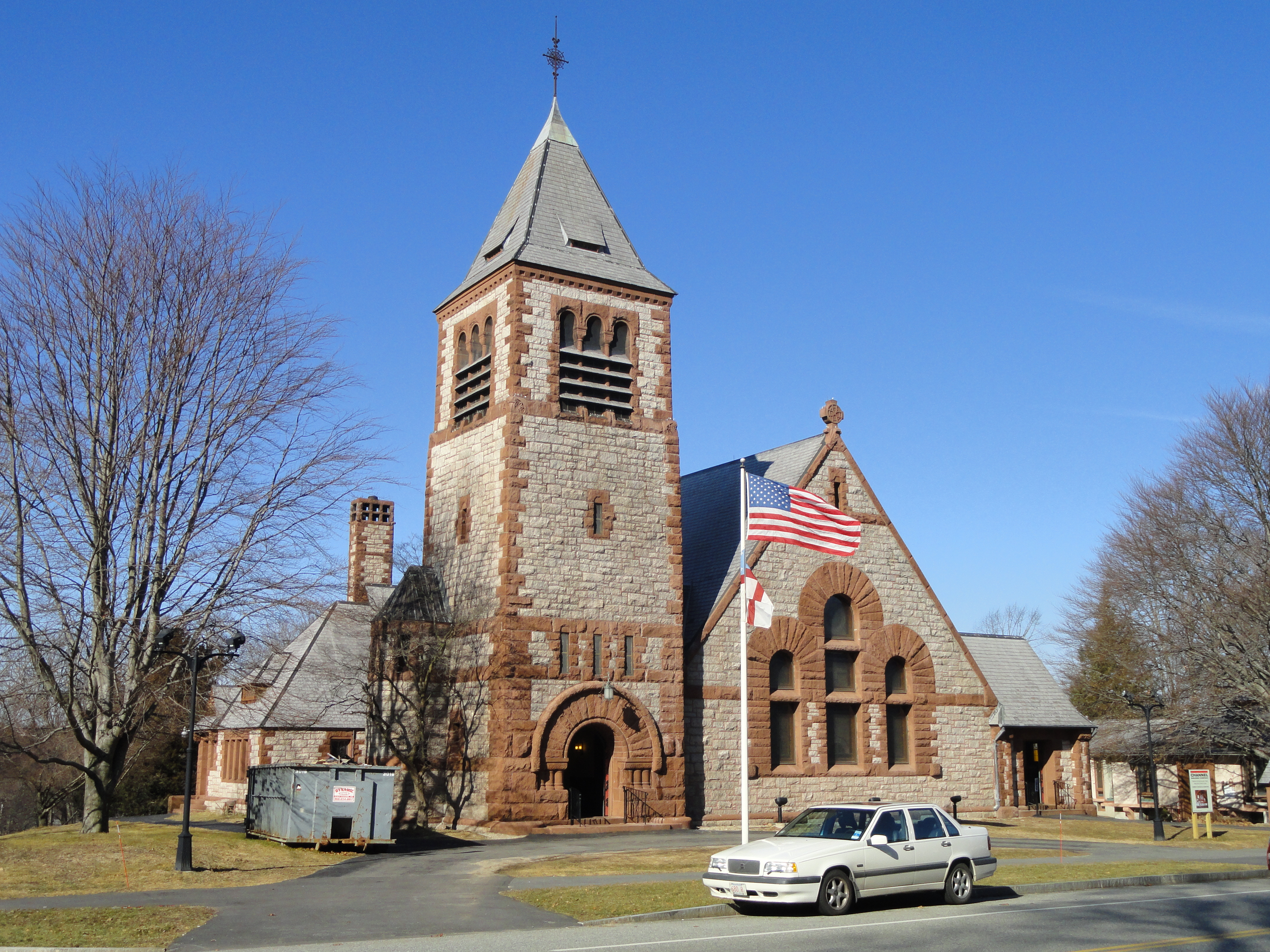
Christ Church (1882), Andover, Massachusetts.

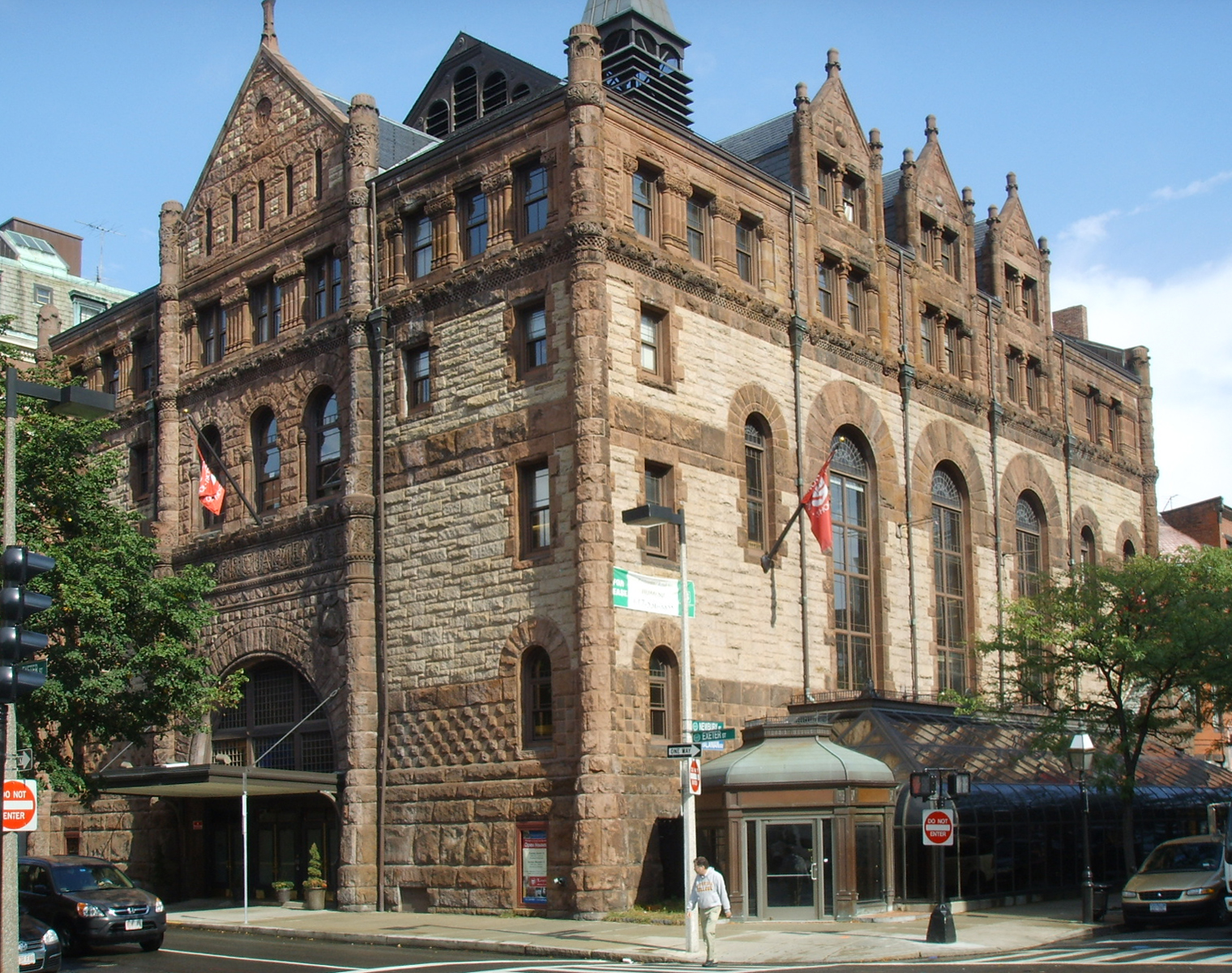
First Spiritual Temple (1885), Boston, Massachusetts

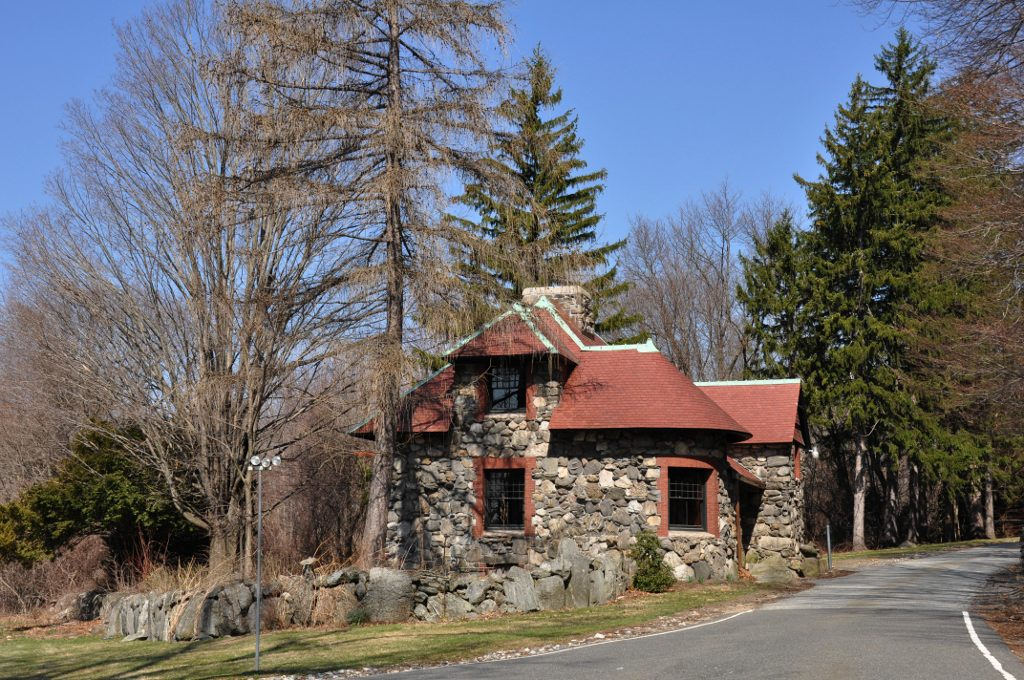
Osgood Hill Gatehouse (1886), North Andover, Massachusetts.

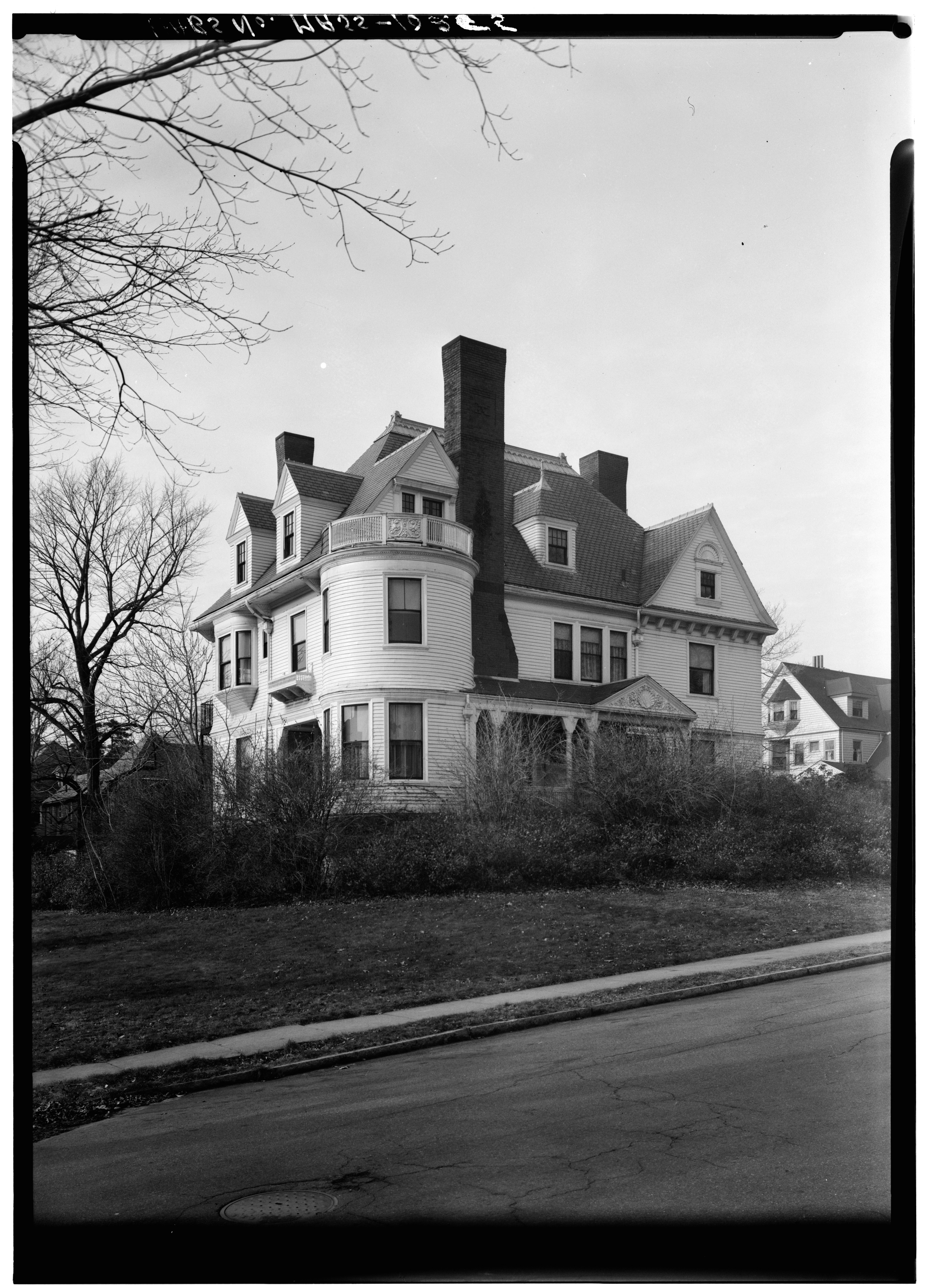
Stillman F. Kelley House (1887), Cambridge, Massachusetts.

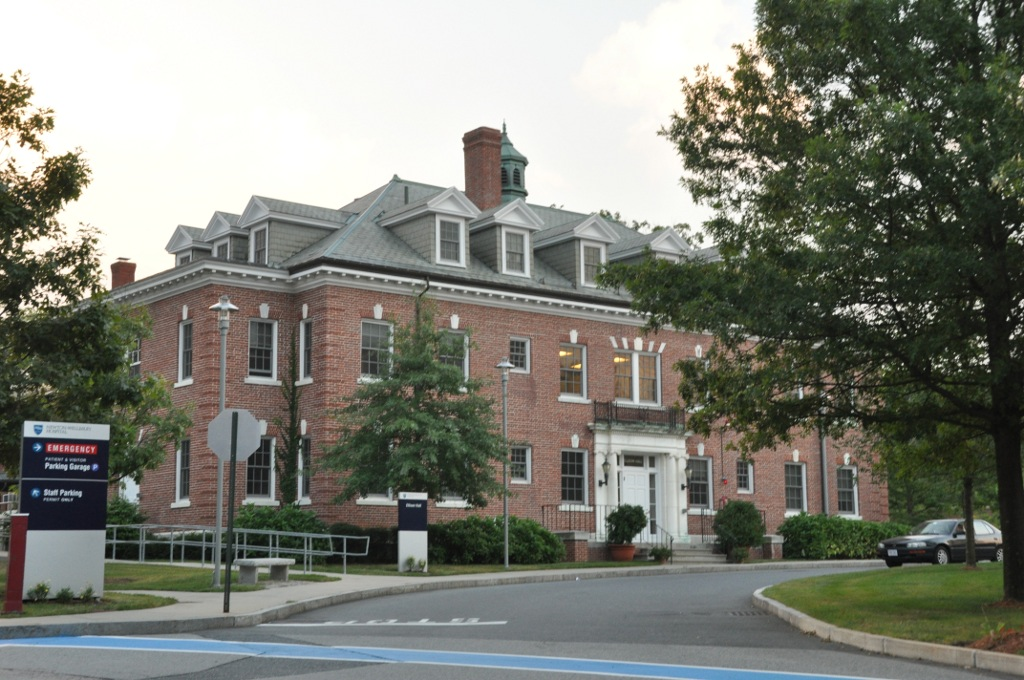
Newton Cottage Hospital (1894), Newton, Massachusetts.

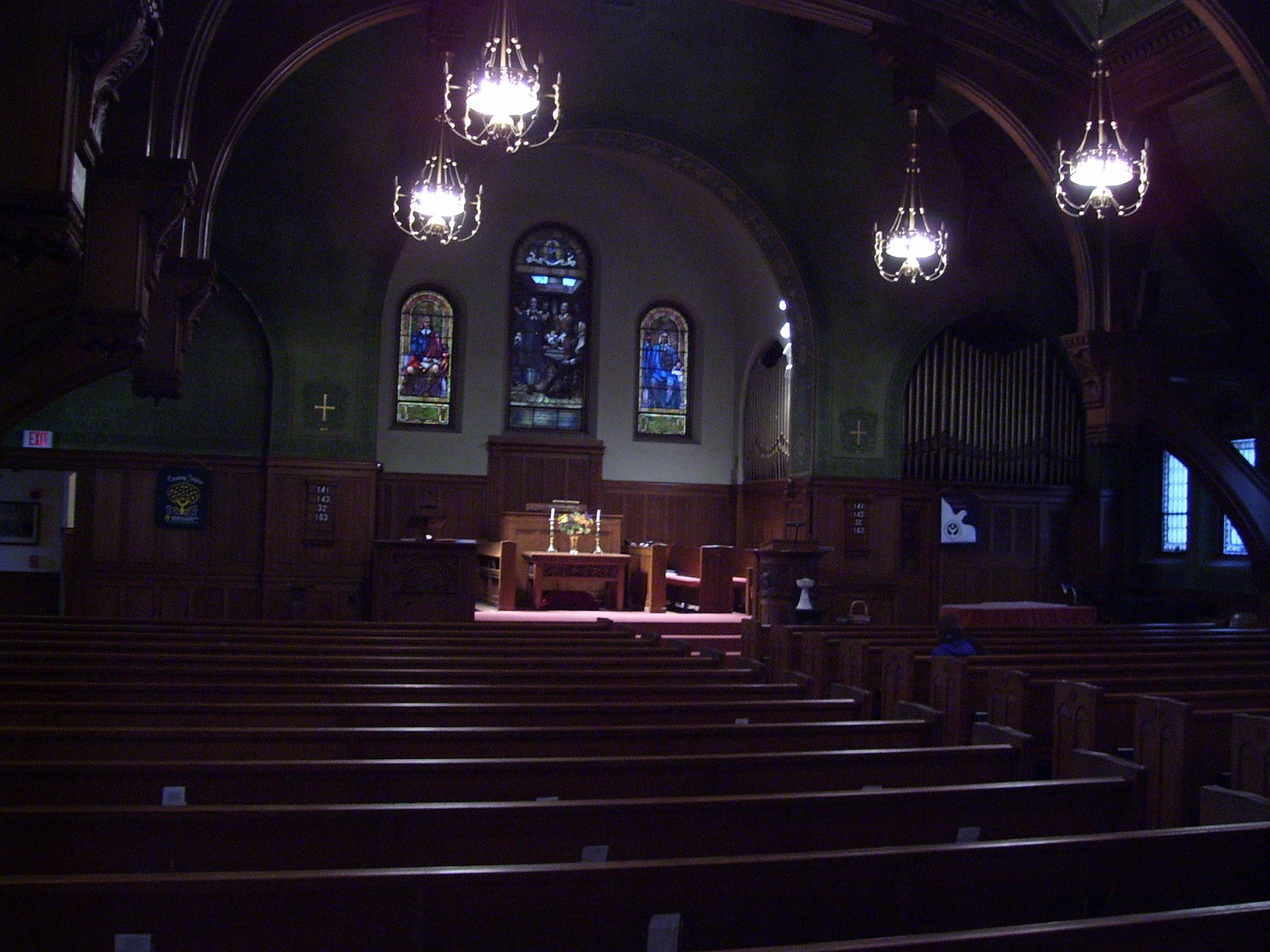
First Parish Church (1897–99), Plymouth, Massachusetts.

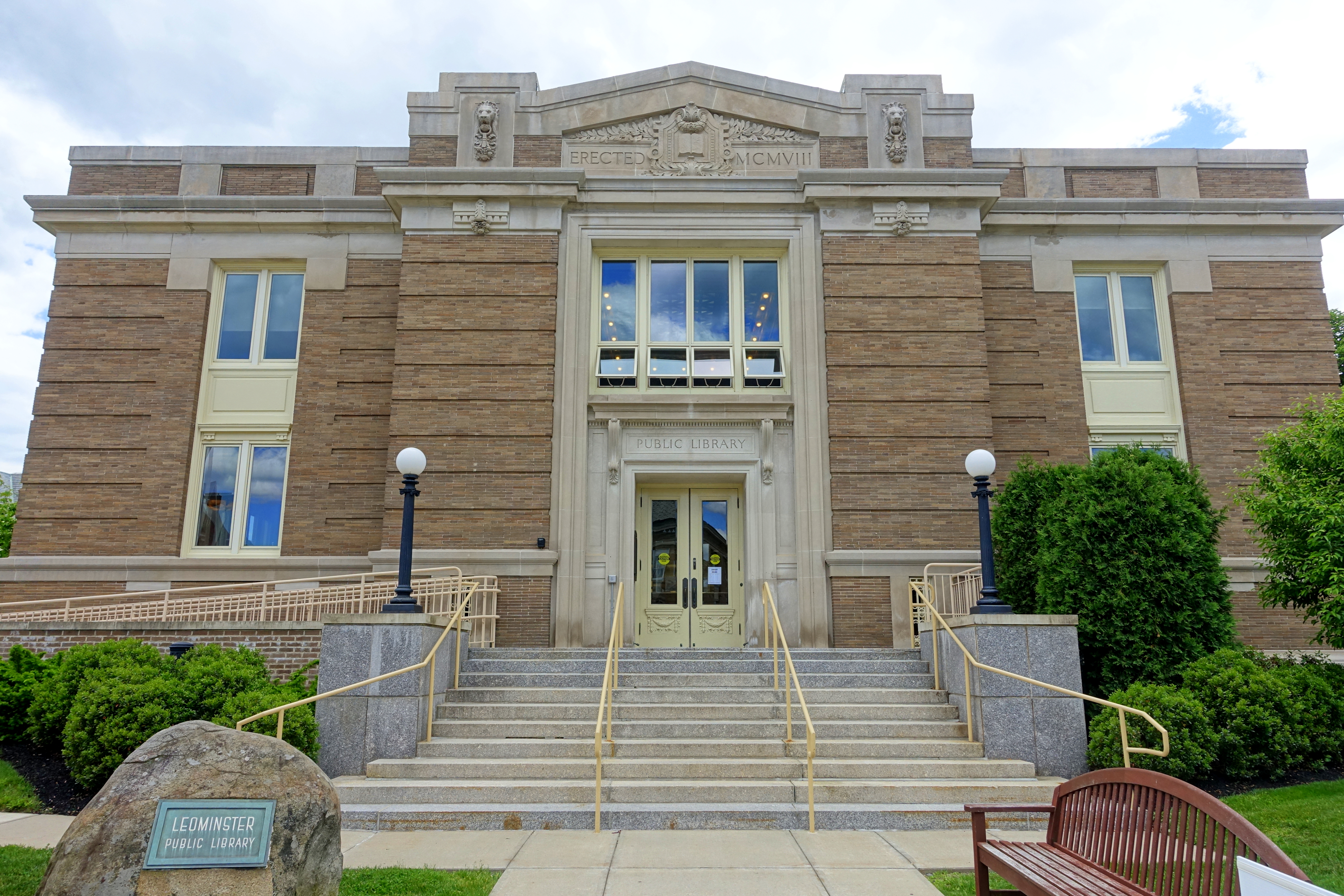
Leominster Public Library (1906–10), Leominster, Massachusetts.
