= Osgood Hill =

- U.S. National Register of Historic Places
- U.S. Historic district
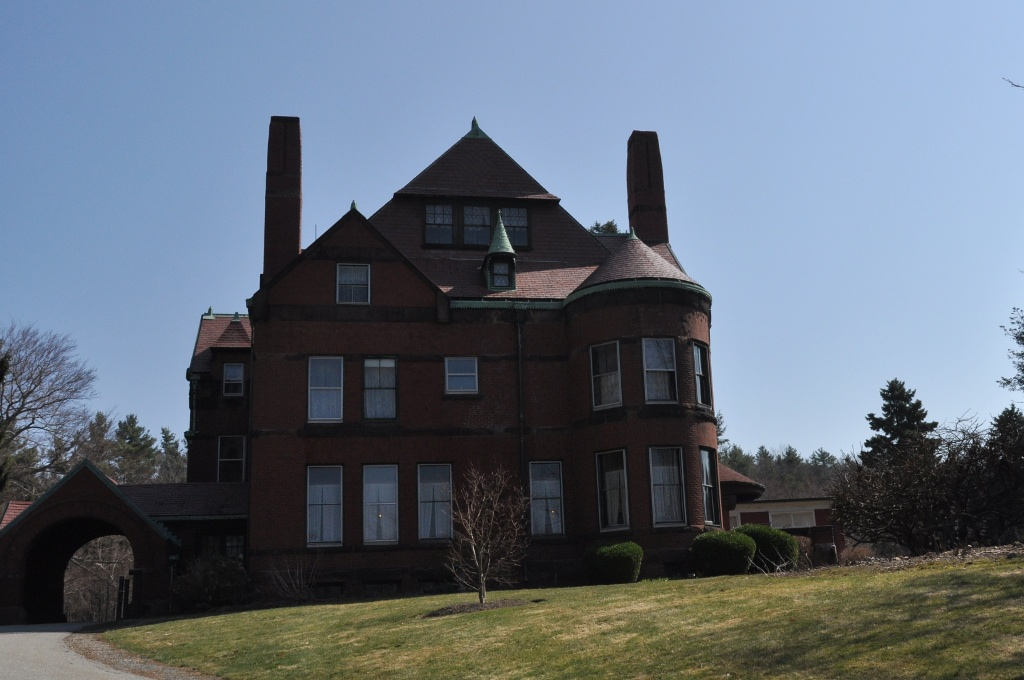

- Location within Massachusetts Location within the United States
- Location: North Andover, Massachusetts
- Coordinates: 42°42′35″N 71°6′45″W
- Built: 1884
- Architect: Hartwell and Richardson; Bowditch, Ernest W.
- Architectural style: Romanesque, Shingle Style
- NRHP reference No.: 99000135
- Added to NRHP: February 5, 1999

Osgood Hill, also known as the Stevens Estate at Osgood Hill, is a mansion and estate at 709–23 Osgood Street in North Andover, Massachusetts. It was listed on the National Register of Historic Places in 1999.

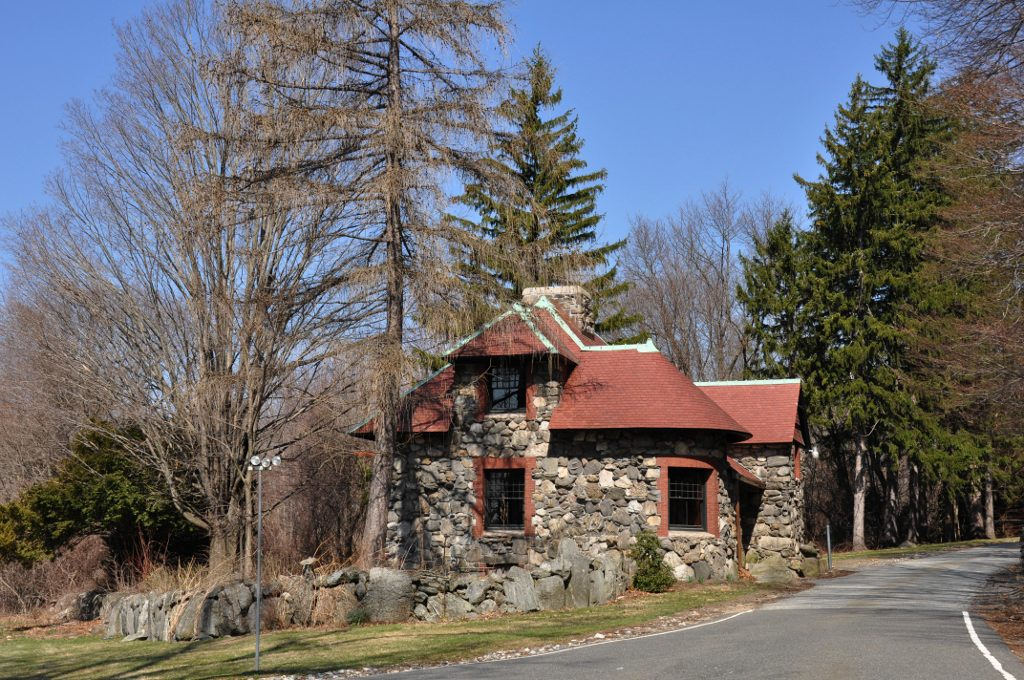
Osgood Hill Gatehouse.

Textile manufacturer Moses Tyler Stevens created the estate between 1884 and 1886, with architect William C. Richardson, who designed the mansion and several outbuildings. Richardson emulated the Romanesque Revival style popularized by H. H. Richardson (no relation).

Osgood Hill is one of the finest intact examples of the Aesthetic Design Movement of the late 1800's. Inspired by Oscar Wilde's 1882 North American lecture tours on the subject of the Aesthetic Movement, the "House Beautiful" at Osgood Hill was designed as a dramatic acknowledgement of the philosophy of the famed playwright, poet genius and social commentator; that the vital intensity of the aesthetic experience is the paramount goal in human life, that art needs no justification and need not serve a moral purpose.

The property has three times been saved from development: in 1951 it was donated to Boston University by the Stevens heirs to avoid that fate; and the town of North Andover purchased the property in 1995 when the university planned to sell it for development as house lots. It is currently operated as a conference center and is a popular venue for weddings.

== See also ==
- National Register of Historic Places listings in Essex County, Massachusetts
