= Youth's Companion Building =

- U.S. National Register of Historic Places
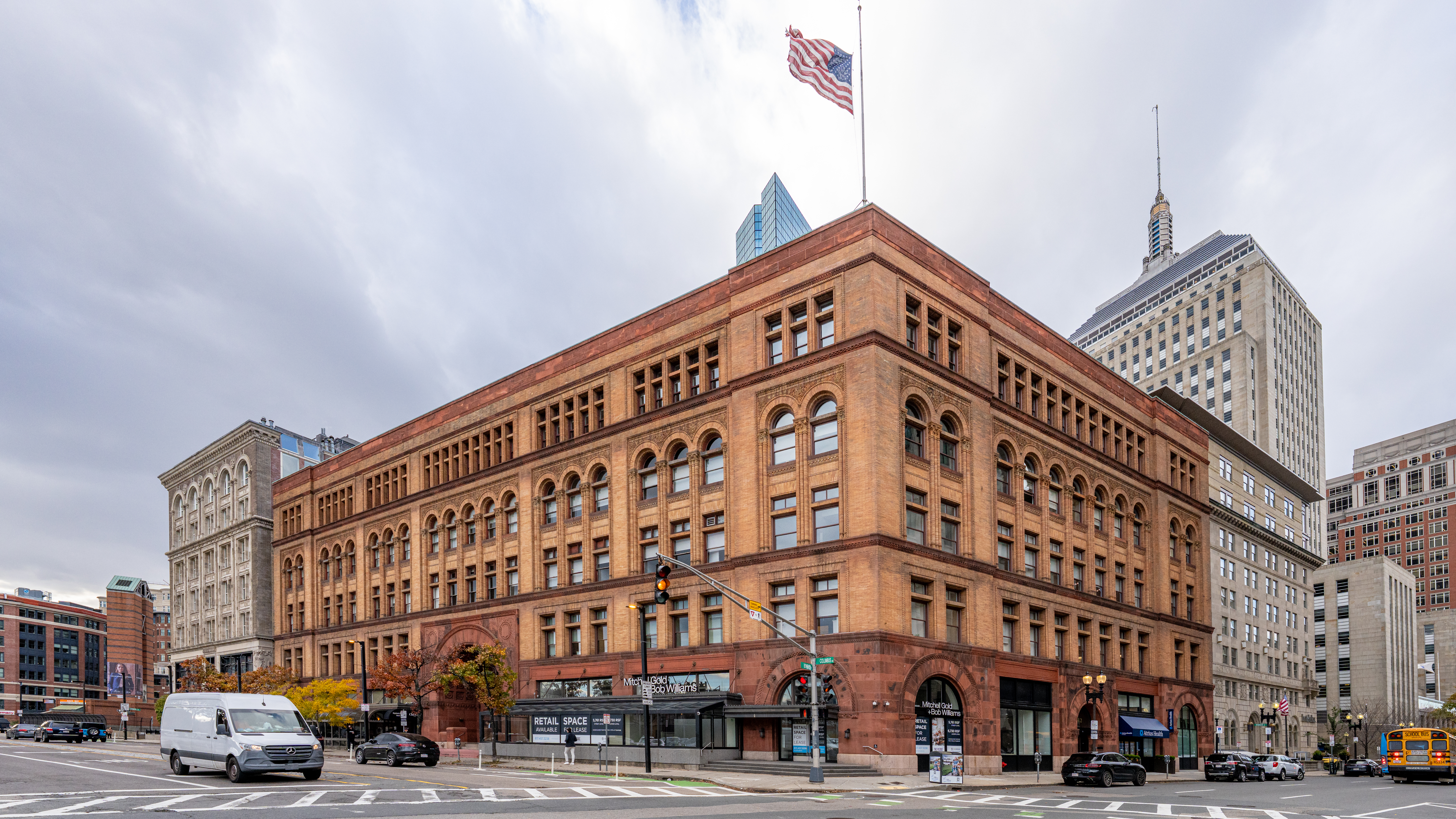
- Columbus Ave and Berkeley Street facades

- Location within Boston Location within Massachusetts Location within the United States
- Location: 209 Columbus Ave. Boston, Massachusetts
- Coordinates: 42°20′55″N 71°4′20″W
- Area: 0.6 acres (0.24 ha)
- Built: 1892
- Architect: Hartwell and Richardson
- Architectural style: Romanesque, Richardsonian Romanesque
- NRHP reference No.: 74000393
- Added to NRHP: May 02, 1974

The Youth's Companion Building is a historic building at 209 Columbus Avenue in Boston, Massachusetts. The building is also known as the Pledge of Allegiance Building because the Pledge of Allegiance was written and published there. The building originally had the address 201 Columbus Avenue and also has the address 142 Berkeley Street. It was built in 1892 and added to the National Register of Historic Places in 1974.

It housed the offices of The Youth's Companion, the magazine owned and edited by Daniel Ford that promoted the Pledge of Allegiance. Ford built the building for The Youth's Companion and moved the magazine's headquarters there in 1892, where it remained until 1915, when the magazine moved to a new building near the current Boston University.

Ford's monumental, five-story building combined beauty and artistic qualities with good design and lay out for a publishing business, with natural light from windows and skylights. His style was the round-arched, squat-columned, masonry-exalting Romanesque. This five-storied building Richardson designed for The Companion is of brown sandstone and matching brick, as solid and impressive as a bank. Great arched windows and heavily recessed and arched doors characterize the street facade. Passing beneath the great arch, one enters a great vestibule two stories high. Throughout the interior the woodwork was of oak with heavily carved oaken benches for waiting visitors.

The architects, Henry W. Hartwell and William Cummings Richardson, also designed a number of other buildings in the Boston area, notably the Belmont Town Hall and Christ Church, Andover.

When used by The Youth's Companion, the first floor of the building held the business office, correspondence department, subscription and advertising departments with Ford's office in the back. The third floor held the premium department, packing and mailing room, and stitching machines. The fifth floor contained the editorial offices, art department and library that had an encyclopedic collection of clippings from over 200 magazines from around the world. The press room was in the basement along with the presses, collators, steam tubular boilers for power binding equipment and two dynamos which generated electricity for lighting.

== See also ==
- National Register of Historic Places listings in northern Boston, Massachusetts
