= Exeter Street Theatre =

Building in Boston, Massachusetts, United States

Coordinates: 42°21′1.81″N 71°4′48.07″W

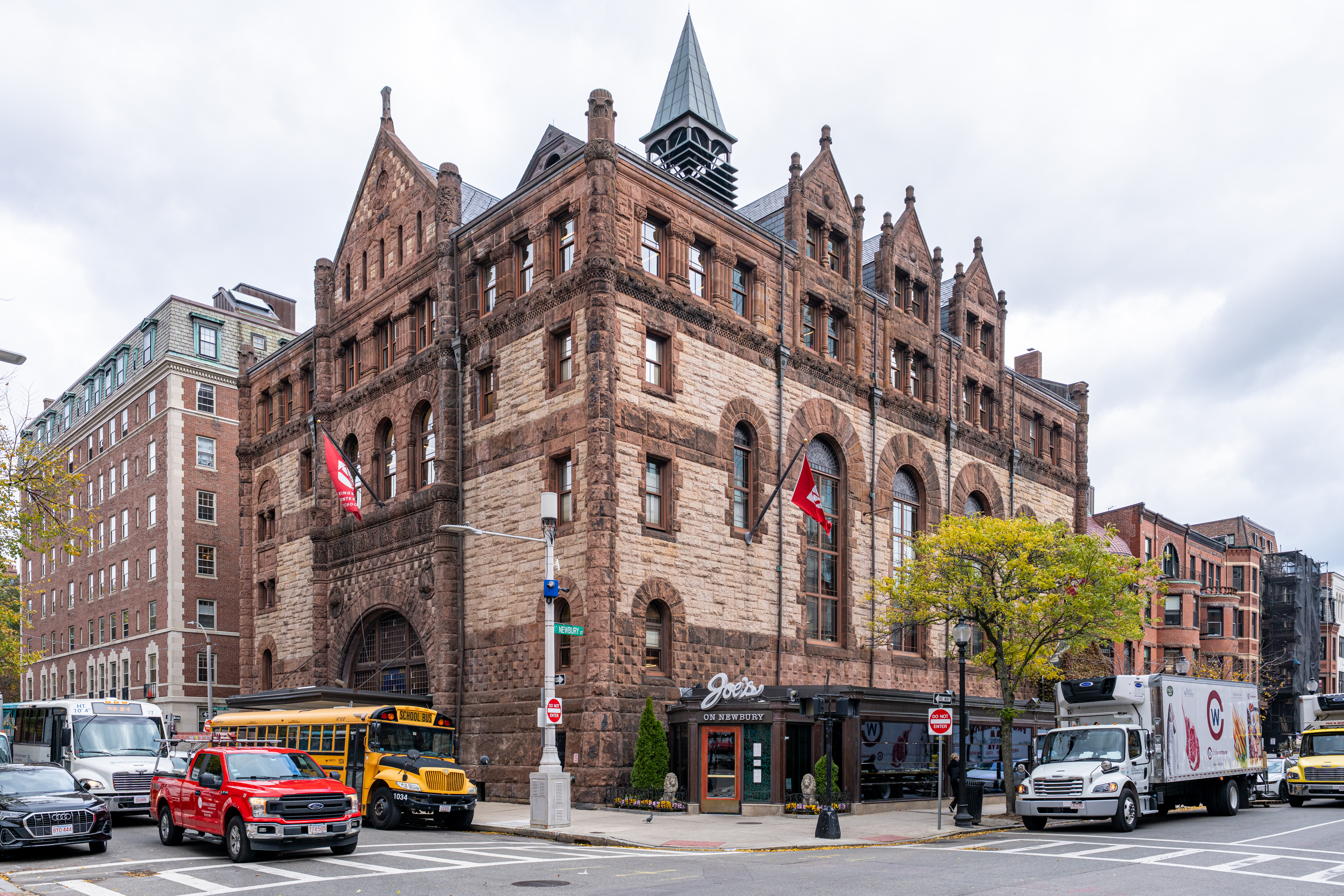
The former Exeter Street Theatre building, Boston (2025)

The Exeter Street Theatre is a Richardsonian Romanesque building at the corner of Exeter and Newbury Streets, in the Back Bay section of Boston, Massachusetts. It was built as the First Spiritual Temple, 1884–85, by architects Hartwell and Richardson. For seventy years, from 1914 to 1984, it operated as a movie house. It now houses the Kingsley Montessori School.

== History ==
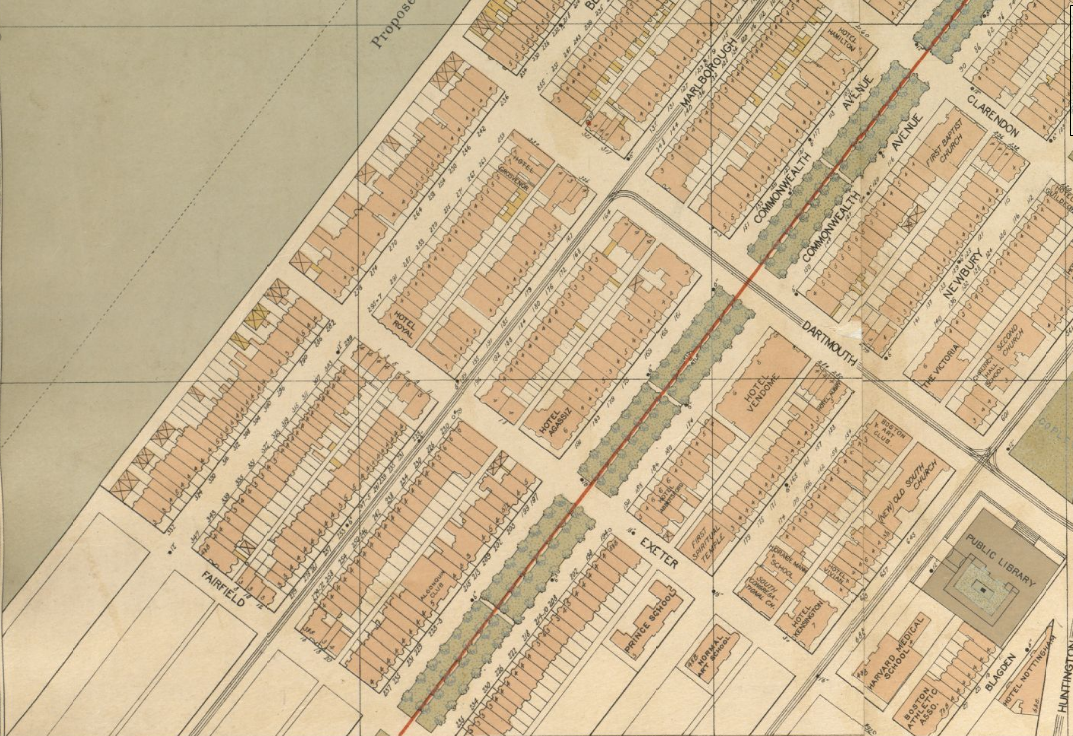
Detail of map of Boston, showing First Spiritual Temple, (1896, prior to cinema)

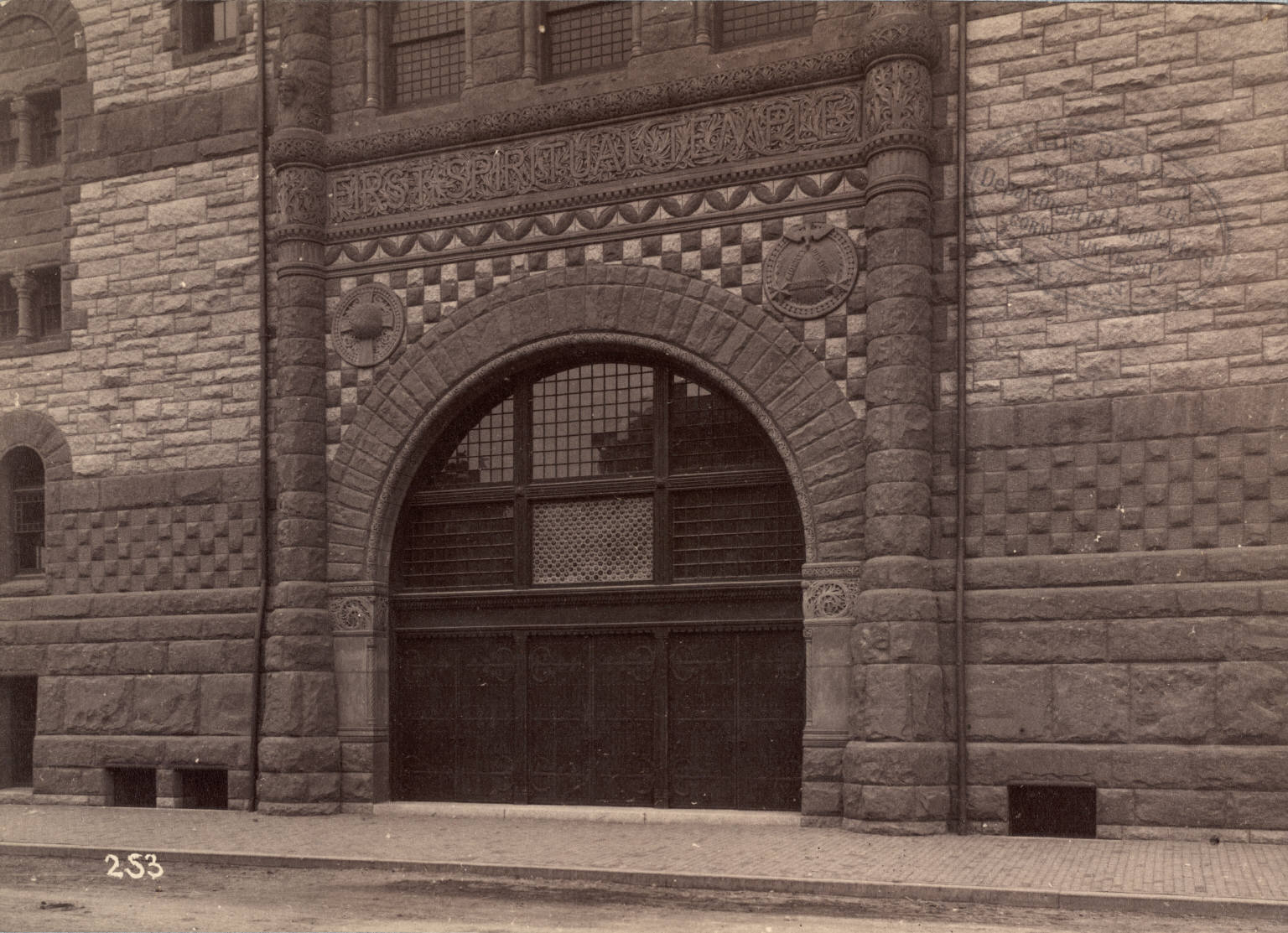
Detail of Hartwell and Richardson's building design (c.1880s-1890s, prior to cinema)

"Wealthy socialite Mrs. [Marcellus Ayer] (Hattie M. Ayer) and her friends" organized the conversion in 1914 of church into cinema; Clarence Blackall designed the renovation. It "could accommodate 900 patrons." Proprietors and overseers included Viola and Florence Berlin, and Neil St. John Raymond. The Working Union of Progressive Spiritualists continued to meet in the building's lower auditorium until 1974, when the congregation relocated to neighboring Brookline (and subsequently to Harwich, on Cape Cod), and they and/or Hattie Ayer sold the theater operation and building.

After the theatre closed in 1984 amidst popular cultural anguish and bottom-line real-estate concerns, the building has been deployed for a variety of mostly commercial purposes. It was occupied by Conran's housewares retailer and Waterstones booksellers. By 1988 "the Exeter Street Theatre building [housed TGI] Friday's Restaurant and an office complex." Business consultants Idealab leased space in the building from 2000 to 2003. In 2005 it became the Kingsley Montessori School.

One of the cinema's electric signs, scrapped in 1985, was acquired by collector Dave Waller.

John Cheever's short story "The President of the Argentine" mentions the Exeter Street Theatre.

Gregory Mcdonald's second book in the Fletch series Confess, Fletch (1976) mentions an Alec Guinness Saturday matinee double feature of The Lavender Hill Mob and The Man in the White Suit at the Exeter Street Theatre.

== Screenings ==
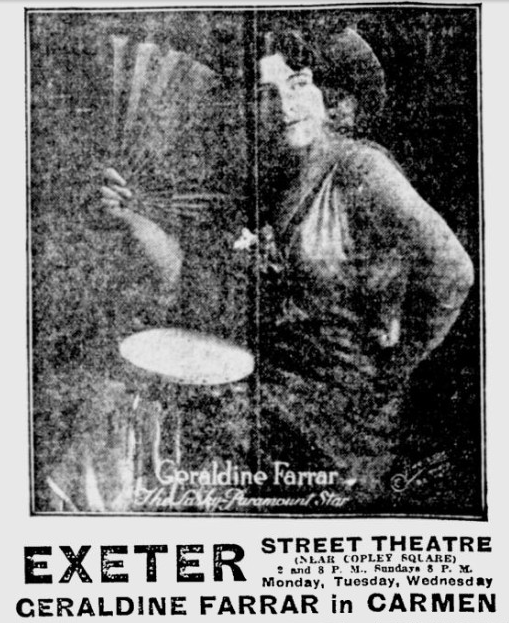
Advertisement for Geraldine Farrar in Cecil B. DeMille's Carmen (1915)

=== 1910s ===
- The Foundling
- Tess of the Storm Country

=== 1920s ===
- A Virtuous Vamp
- Haunting Shadows
- Robert Z. Leonard's Stronger Than Death
- Live Sparks
- Passion Flower
- Just Out of College
- Sowing the Wind
- Haunted Spooks
- Pink Gods
- The Man Who Saw Tomorrow
- East is West

=== 1960s ===
- The Endless Summer

=== 1970s ===
- The Rocky Horror Picture Show

=== 1980s ===
- Lynne Littman's Testament
- The Leopard
- "The Man Who Skied Down Everest"
- The Tin Drum
