= Ware Town Hall =

- U.S. National Register of Historic Places
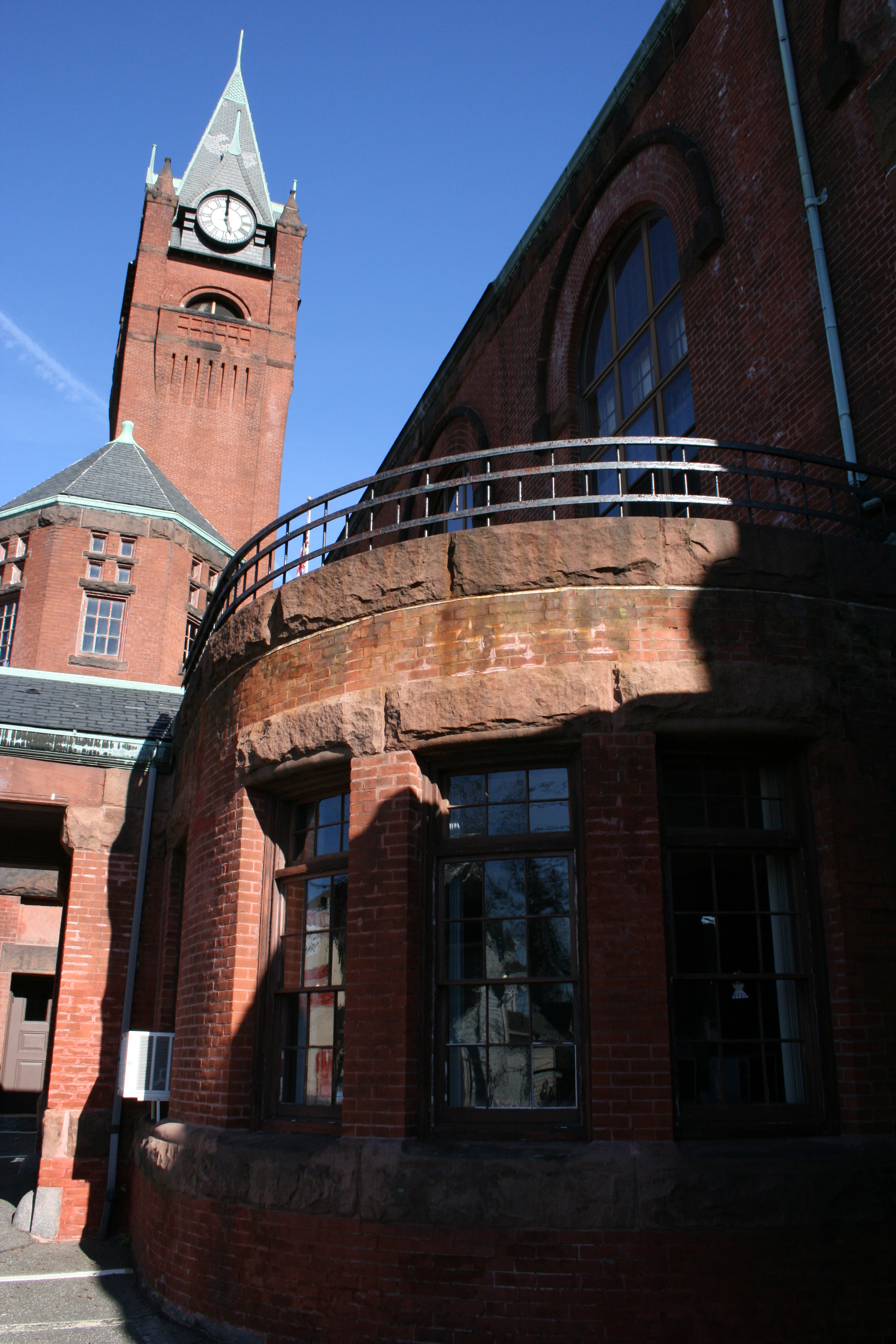
- Ware Town Hall

- Location within Massachusetts Location within the United States
- Location: Ware, Massachusetts
- Coordinates: 42°15′36″N 72°14′35″W
- Built: 1885
- Architect: Hartwell and Richardson; Et al.
- Architectural style: Romanesque
- NRHP reference No.: 86001403
- Added to NRHP: June 26, 1986

Ware Town Hall is a historic town hall at Main and West Streets in Ware, Massachusetts. It was built in 1885 to a design by the architectural firm of Hartwell and Richardson, and is a prominent local example of Romanesque Revival architecture. The building, enlarged in 1904 and 1935 with stylistically sensitive additions, was listed on the National Register of Historic Places in 1986.

== Description and history ==
Ware Town Hall is located in the town center, at the southeast corner of Main (Massachusetts Route 9) Street and West Street. It is a roughly square shape, built out of red brick trimmed with red sandstone, with a tall hip roof and tower on one flank. The tower is square, rising to a pyramidal roof. At the center of the Main Street facade is a large round-arch opening, in which the main entrance is recessed. A secondary entrance is found on the lower level of the west side, facing West Street, under a projecting gabled canopy. Windows on the side are set in round-arch openings. The main floor of the building houses an auditorium and theater facilities, and the town offices are located in the basement.

In the town's early days, its town meetings were held in the meeting house located at Ware Center, the town's geographic and early civic center. The present center arose around a manufacturing village that grew in the early 19th century. The first town hall was built in 1847, and burned in 1860. Until construction of this building was completed in 1886, town meetings were held in the Music Hall on Bank Street. This building was designed by Hartwell & Richardson, a Boston firm noted for its designs carrying the Richardsonian Romanesque influence. That firm also designed a 1904 enlargement, necessitated in part of state fire regulations concerning the number of exits in performance venues (which the main auditorium was used for). It was again enlarged in 1935, in another stylistically sensitive design by local architect Thomas Madigan.

== See also ==
- Ware Center Historic District, where town meetings were held until 1847
- National Register of Historic Places listings in Hampshire County, Massachusetts
