= Central Congregational Church (Newton, Massachusetts) =

Historic church in Massachusetts, United States

- U.S. National Register of Historic Places
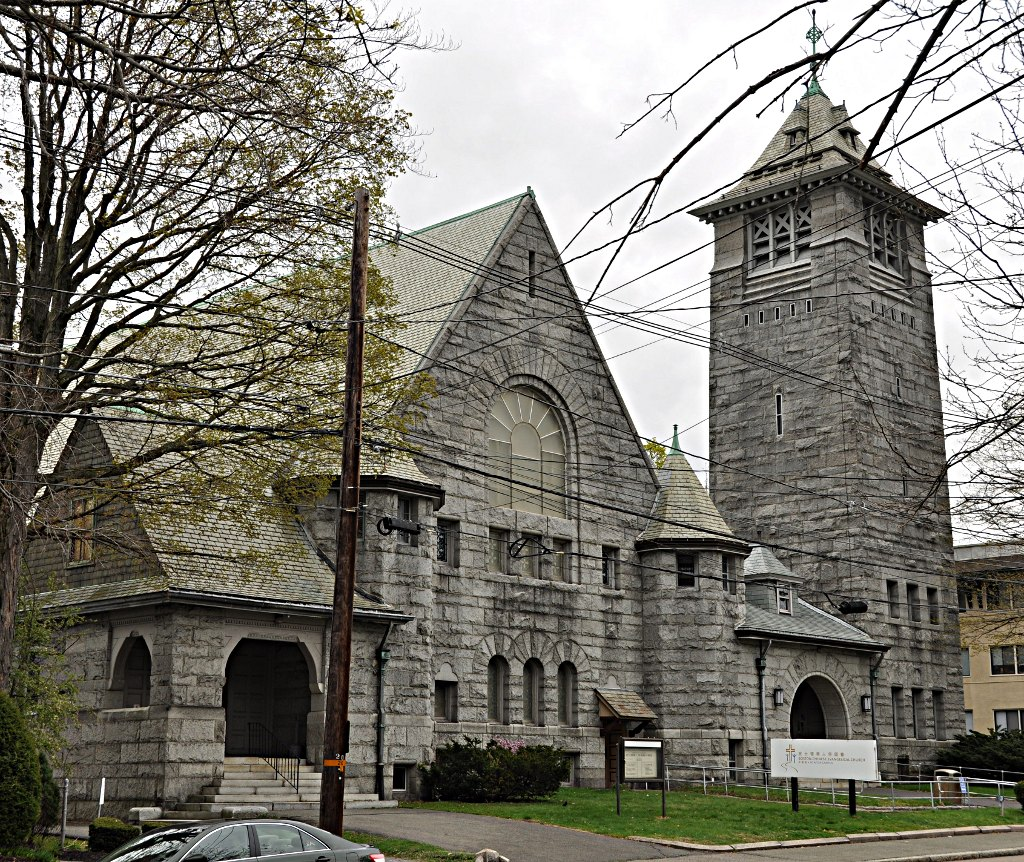

- Location within Massachusetts Location within the United States
- Location: Newton, Massachusetts
- Coordinates: 42°21′11″N 71°12′27″W
- Built: 1895
- Architect: Hartwell and Richardson
- Architectural style: Romanesque
- MPS: Newton MRA
- NRHP reference No.: 86001781
- Added to NRHP: September 4, 1986

The Central Congregational Church is an historic church building located at 218 Walnut Street, in the village of Newtonville in Newton, Massachusetts. Built in 1895, it is the only ecclesiastical work in the city by the noted Boston architects Hartwell and Richardson, and one of its finest examples of Romanesque architecture. The building was listed on the National Register of Historic Places in 1986. Since September 7, 2003, it has been the Newton Campus of the Boston Chinese Evangelical Church.

== Description and history ==
The Central Congregational Church is set on the east side of Walnut Street near the center of the village of Newtonville. It is a substantial granite structure, with a slate roof and a square four-story tower. The main sanctuary is oriented east-west, with turrets at the corners, beyond which entrance pavilions extend to either side. The entry on the right continues to the tower, which has a decoratively-louvered belfry below a flared pyramidal roof.

The congregation that built the church was organized in 1868. This church was built for it in 1895, designed by Hartwell and Richardson; it is possible that partner William C. Richardson was a parishioner—he lived in Newtonville at the time. The firm also designed a number of other buildings in Newton, including the Masonic Building in Newtonville in 1896, but this is the only church they designed in Newton. The church was acquired in 2003 by the Boston Chinese Evangelical Church (founded in 1961).

== See also ==
- National Register of Historic Places listings in Newton, Massachusetts
