= Old Cambridge Baptist Church =

Historic church in Massachusetts, United States

- U.S. National Register of Historic Places
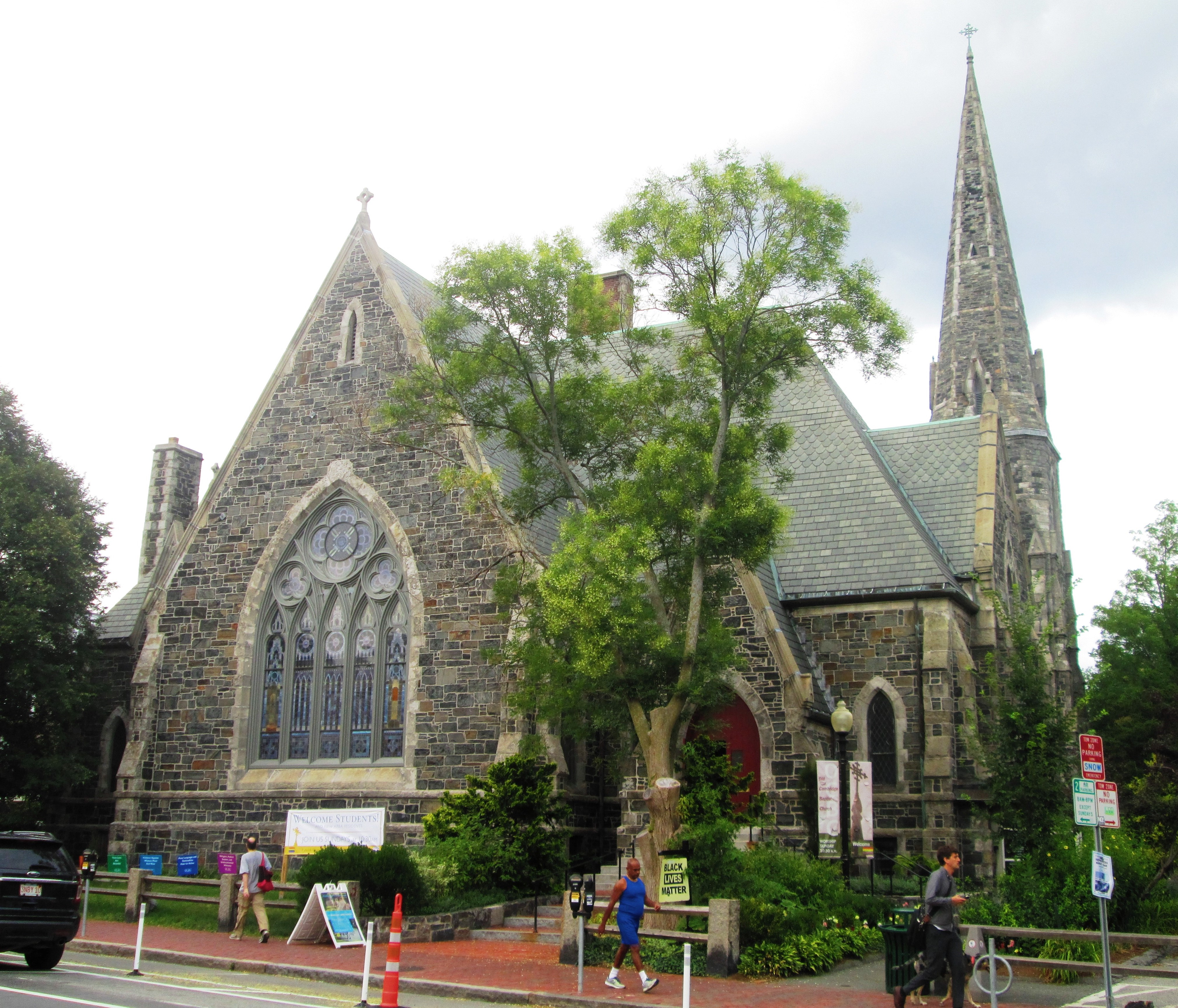
- (2017)

- Location within Massachusetts
- Location: 400 Harvard Street (Cambridge, Massachusetts
- Coordinates: 42°22′18.0″N 71°6′51.2″W
- Built: 1869
- Architect: Alexander Rice Esty
- Architectural style: Gothic Revival
- MPS: Cambridge MRA
- NRHP reference No.: 82001968
- Added to NRHP: April 13, 1982

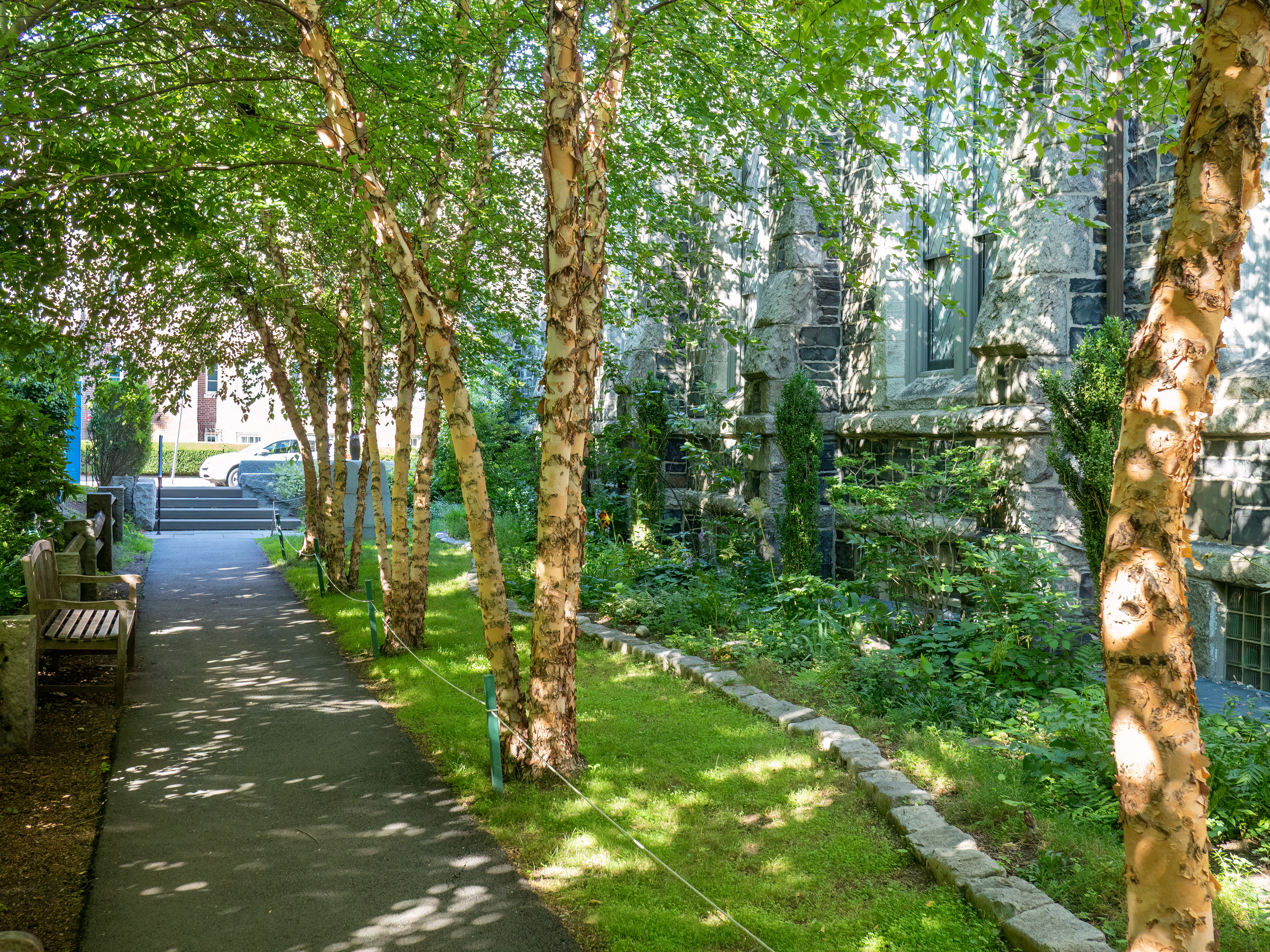
The church's gardens

The Old Cambridge Baptist Church is a historic American Baptist church at 400 Harvard Street in Cambridge, Massachusetts.

The congregation was founded in 1844 when several members of First Baptist Church in Cambridge decided to start a new church. The original meeting house was sold to the Congregationalists and became North Avenue Congregational Church. In 1869 the church constructed the current meeting house, a larger Gothic Revival stone building, designed by architect Alexander Rice Esty. Old Cambridge Baptist Church was added to the National Register of Historic Places in 1982.

Built of local fieldstone and granite quarried in Somerville, Massachusetts, the building is a notable example of the muscular use of stone, typical of American Gothic Revival architecture. This solidity, coupled with Esty's display of structural strength in the asymmetrical massing of forms, is further accentuated by the contrast between heavy gray stone and large, graceful, delicate stained glass windows, which the stone walls simultaneously reveal and protect.

In 1897, the original parish hall was lost in a fire. The rebuild was under the direction of noted Boston Theater Architect, Clarence Blackall. The most notable feature of the reconstruction is an 1890 Tiffany & Company Window. This early Tiffany window bridges the gothic stained glass tradition and emerging art nouveau movement.

The church is currently home to various organizations and ministries, such as the Homeless Empowerment Project which publishes the Spare Change News street newspaper, the José Mateo Ballet Theatre, the Adbar Ethiopian Women's Alliance, the Cambridge Child and Family Associates, and others.

== Notable people affiliated with church ==
- Ezra Palmer Gould, pastor (1868), Christian author

== See also ==
- National Register of Historic Places listings in Cambridge, Massachusetts
