= Isaac McLean House =

Historic house in Massachusetts, United States

- U.S. National Register of Historic Places
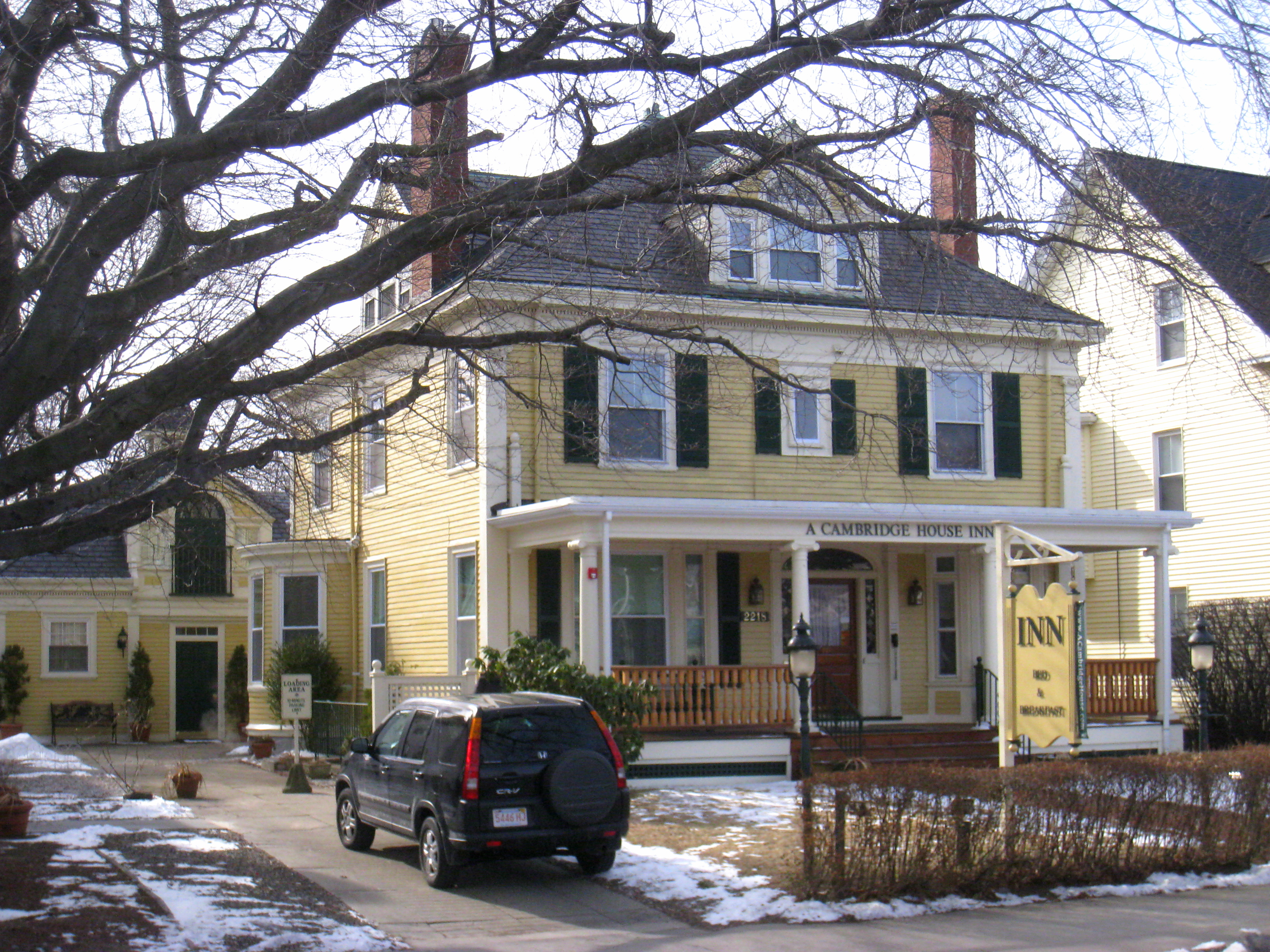

- Location within Massachusetts Location within the United States
- Location: 2218 Massachusetts Ave., Cambridge, Massachusetts
- Coordinates: 42°23′35.88″N 71°7′34.28″W
- Built: 1894
- Architect: Hartwell and Richardson; McLean, Isaac
- Architectural style: Colonial Revival
- MPS: Cambridge MRA
- NRHP reference No.: 82001960
- Added to NRHP: April 13, 1982

Isaac McLean House is an historic house at 2218 Massachusetts Avenue in Cambridge, Massachusetts. The house was built in 1894 and added to the National Register of Historic Places in 1982.

In 1894, Isaac McLean (a well-known Boston Accountant) engaged architects Hartwell and Richardson, and the 2218 Massachusetts Avenue (then known as North Avenue) property was built for his residence. The house was built on one of the lots then known as the Farwell Estate. A well-maintained Colonial Revival (one of the two dominant architectural styles during 1870–1920; the other being the Tudor Revival) graced by a wide porch across the entire front with classic fanlight (or transom) above the main entrance, as well as sidelights. One cannot help but notice the handsome pillars with Ionic capitals and ornamental balustrade as well as the dentils under the cornice, typical of this era. The Isaac McLean House, has been known for over 25 years as A Cambridge House Inn. This property, together with a handful of other Victorian homes represents architecture of historical significance. "This grouping of houses represents the sole remnant of what Massachusetts Avenue once was, the most prestigious Cambridge address for mid to late nineteenth century residential construction."

== See also ==
- National Register of Historic Places listings in Cambridge, Massachusetts
