= Intermediate Building =

- U.S. National Register of Historic Places
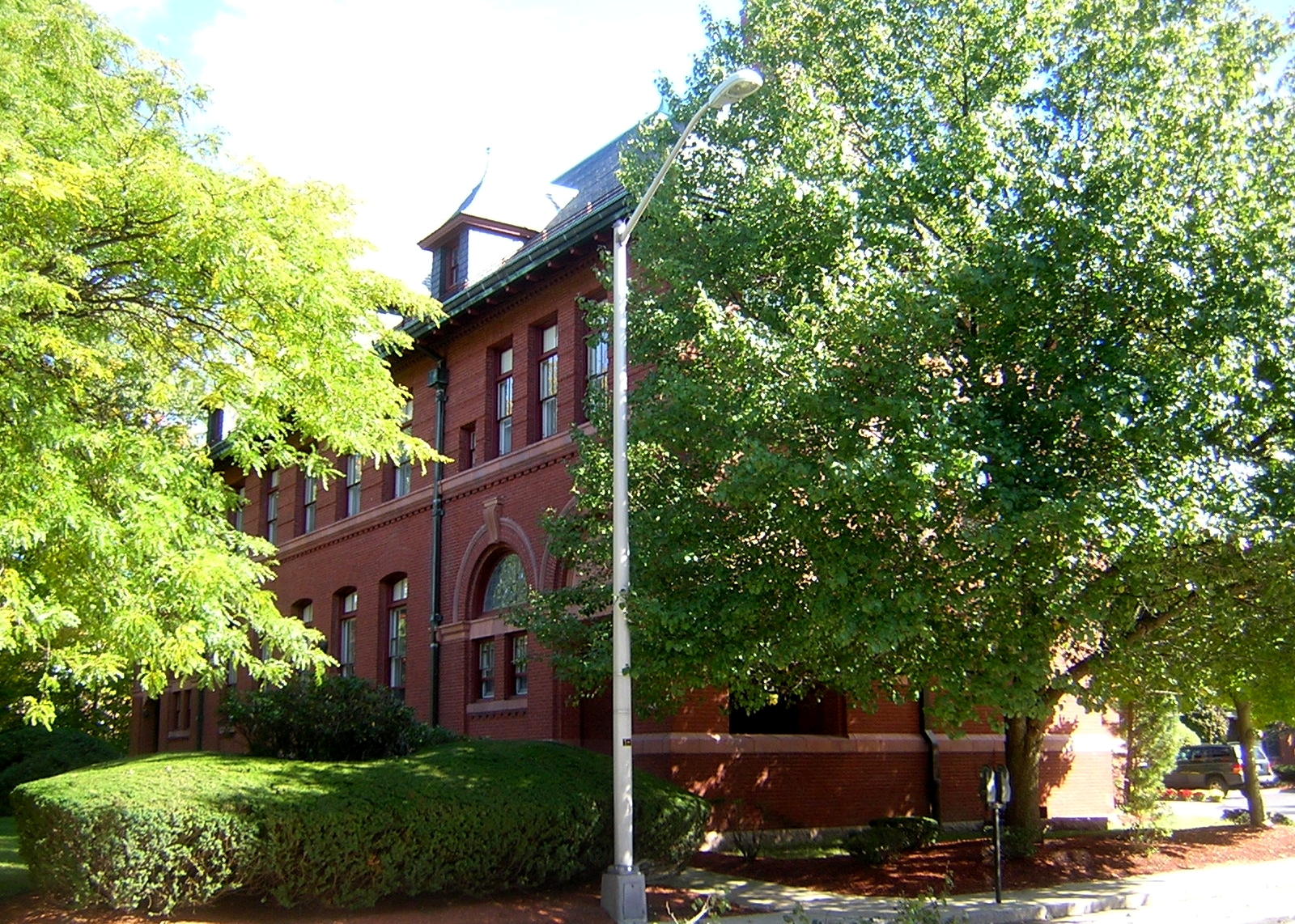

- Location within Massachusetts Location within the United States
- Location: Wellesley Hills, Massachusetts
- Coordinates: 42°18′38.5″N 71°16′31.5″W
- Built: 1894
- Architect: Hartwell and Richardson
- NRHP reference No.: 81000112
- Added to NRHP: August 27, 1981

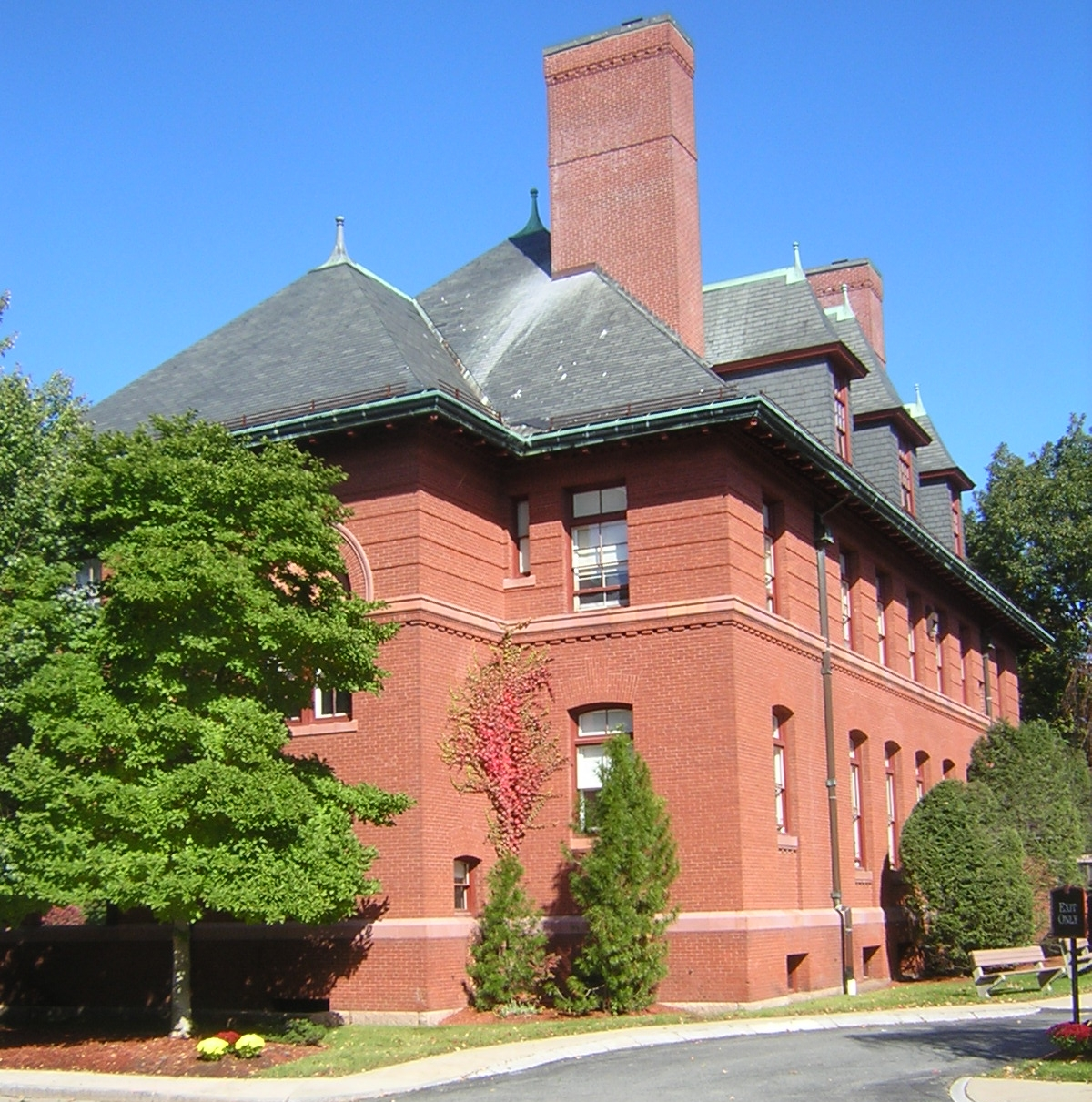

The Intermediate Building is a historic municipal building at 324 Washington Street in Wellesley Hills, Massachusetts. Designed by architects Hartwell and Richardson, and completed in 1894, it is a two-story brick building with Romanesque styling. It has a hip roof pierced by hip-roof dormers, the central one larger than those flanking it. Windows on the first floor have segmented-arch tops, while those on the second level are rectangular. A terra cotta stringcourse separates the first and second levels. The building served as the first Wellesley High School, and later as an annex to Town Hall. It is now Phillips Park Apartments for senior citizens.

The building was listed on the National Register of Historic Places in 1981.

== See also ==
- National Register of Historic Places listings in Norfolk County, Massachusetts
