= J. A. Wood House =

Historic house in Massachusetts, United States

- U.S. National Register of Historic Places
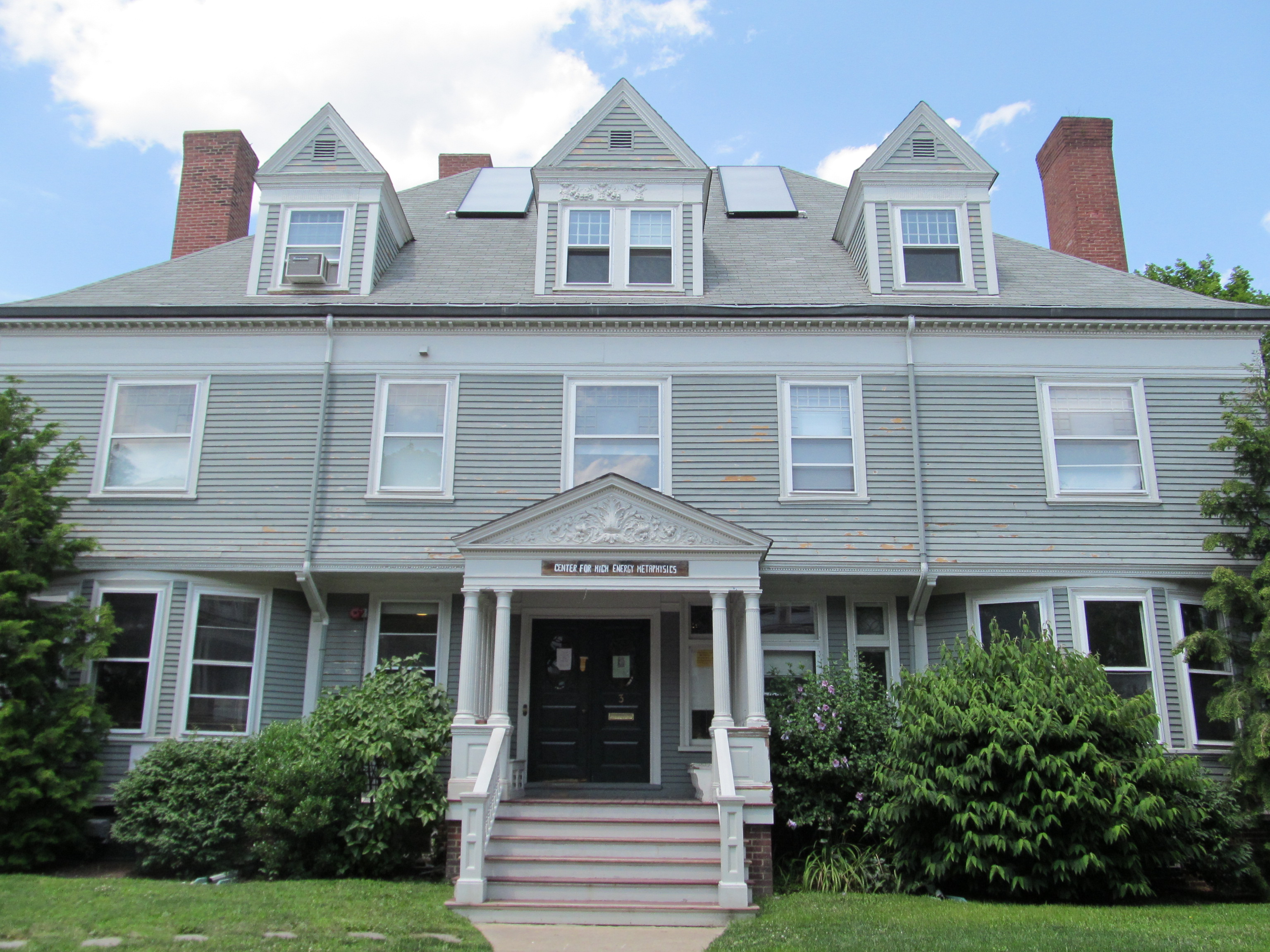
- J. A. Wood House

- Location within Massachusetts Location within the United States
- Location: Cambridge, Massachusetts
- Coordinates: 42°22′58″N 71°07′09″W
- Built: 1888
- Architect: Hartwell and Richardson
- Architectural style: Colonial Revival
- MPS: Cambridge MRA
- NRHP reference No.: 86001319
- Added to NRHP: May 19, 1986

The J. A. Wood House is a historic house located at 3 Sacramento Street in Cambridge, Massachusetts. The large 2 1/2-story wood-frame Colonial Revival house was built in 1888 for James Wood, a lumber dealer. The house was designed by Hartwell and Richardson and originally faced Massachusetts Avenue. In 1925 it was rotated ninety degrees to face Sacramento Street, in order to make way for commercial development. The house is a wide five bays across, with a hip roof that is pierced by three dormers, and a left-side ell that is set back. The front entry is sheltered by a gable-front portico, which is supported by a series of paired Tuscan columns on each side.

Since 1958, the J.A. Wood House, along with a neighboring Victorian structure at 1705 Massachusetts Avenue, have been home to Harvard's Dudley Co-op, an alternative on-campus housing co-operative for undergraduate students. Famous alumni of the Dudley Co-Op include Amy Goodman, host of Democracy Now!.

The house was listed on the National Register of Historic Places in 1986.

== See also ==
- National Register of Historic Places listings in Cambridge, Massachusetts
