= Hancock School =

- U.S. National Register of Historic Places
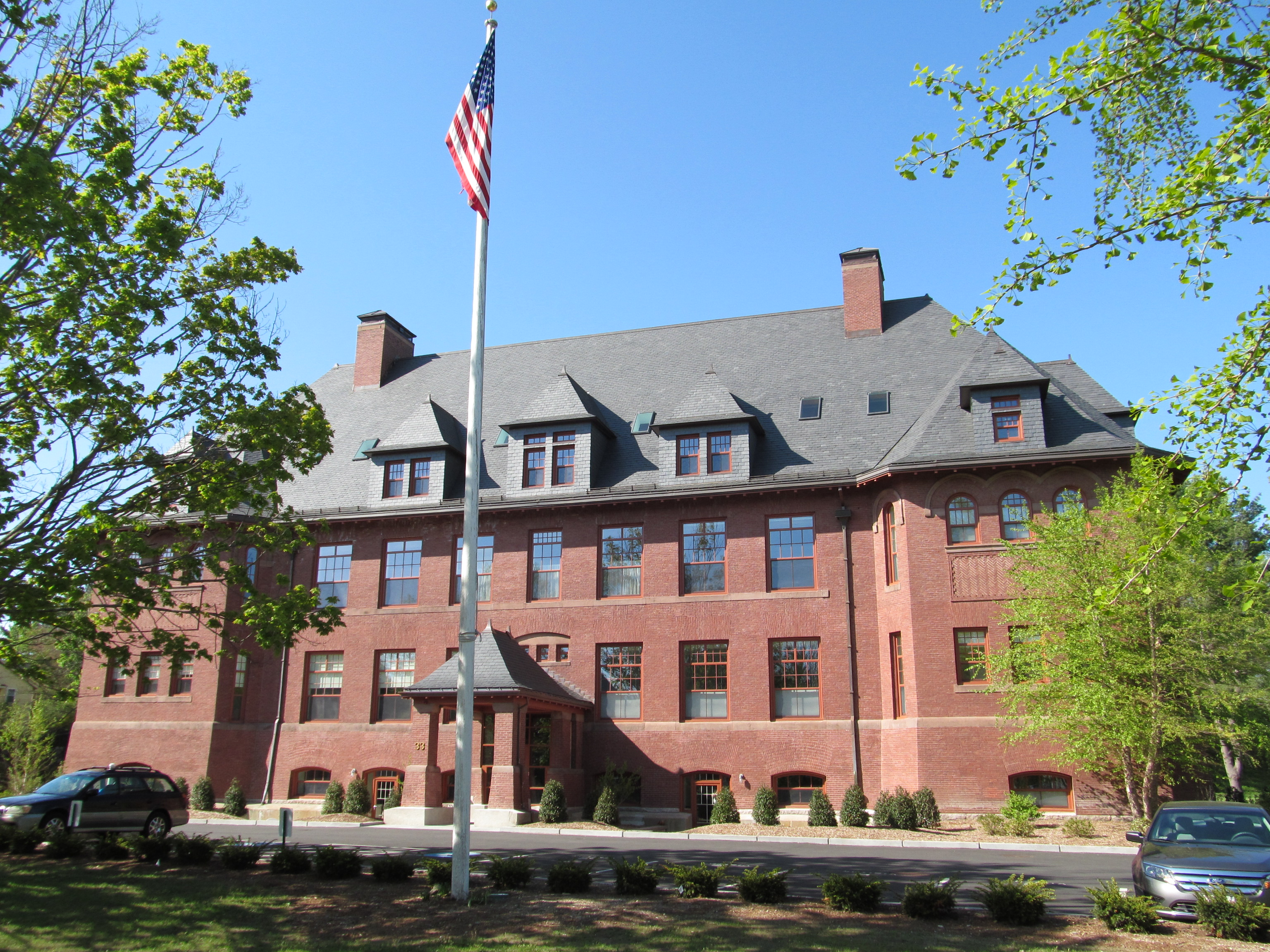
- Pictured in 2012

- Location within Massachusetts Location within the United States
- Location: Lexington, Massachusetts
- Coordinates: 42°26′50″N 71°13′55″W
- Built: 1891
- Architect: Hartwell and Richardson
- Architectural style: Romanesque
- NRHP reference No.: 75000261
- Added to NRHP: August 22, 1975

Hancock School is a historic former school building on 33 Forest Street in Lexington, Massachusetts. It is a 2 1/2-story brick Romanesque Revival structure, with a tall hip roof pierced by hip-roofed dormers. It was designed by the architectural firm of Hartwell and Richardson, and is the only commission of that firm in Lexington. The school was built in 1891 and was added to the National Register of Historic Places in 1975.

For the past 30 years it has housed residential condominium units.

A major fire occurred on Halloween Day 2008. The building's roof and interior have been rebuilt and restored.

== See also ==
- National Register of Historic Places listings in Middlesex County, Massachusetts
