= First Baptist Church (Cambridge, Massachusetts) =

Historic church in Massachusetts, United States

- U.S. National Register of Historic Places
- U.S. Historic district – Contributing property
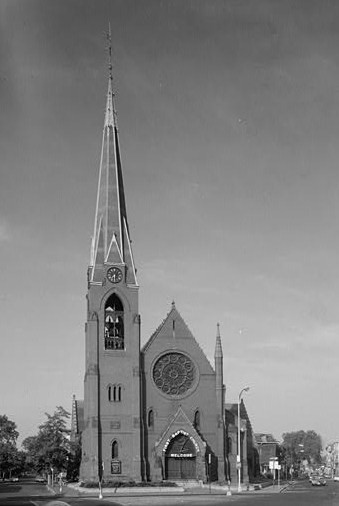
- First Baptist Church in 1967

- Location within Massachusetts Location within the United States
- Location: Magazine and River Streets; Cambridge, Massachusetts
- Coordinates: 42°21′53.5″N 71°6′18″W
- Built: 1881
- Architect: Hartwell and Richardson
- Architectural style: Gothic
- Part of: Central Square Historic District (ID90000128)
- NRHP reference No.: 75000249

Significant dates
- Added to NRHP: April 14, 1975
- Designated CP: March 2, 1990

The First Baptist Church is a historic American Baptist church at Magazine and River Street in Cambridge, Massachusetts within Central Square. In 1817 the church congregation was founded in the home of James Hovey. In 1844 several members of First Baptist Church left to found nearby Old Cambridge Baptist Church. First Baptist Church's current Gothic building was constructed in 1881 to a design by Hartwell and Richardson. It was added to the National Register of Historic Places in 1975.

== Architecture ==
The First Baptist Church is set just south of the main intersection at the heart of Central Square, on a roughly trapezoidal lot bounded by River Street, Green Street, Magazine Street, and Franklin Street. The church building is roughly L-shaped, with its front facing north toward the square. The long main section of the building houses the sanctuary, and the rear section, extending a short way to the west, houses a parish hall, offices and other facilities of the church.

The church is a tall single-story brick structure, with sandstone trim and decorative detailing in terra cotta, and has Gothic Revival styling. It has a gabled slate roof with a clerestory section near the top of the gable, with the rear section having a cross-gable roof. The slate is mainly gray-green, with bands of red. A tower rises at the northeast corner of the building, rising to an open belfry with lancet-arch windows at the third stage. Clock face sections with gabled tops interrupt the steeple, which is eight-sided, finished in slate.

The church is the third to be built by the Baptist congregation, which acquired the property in 1819. The first two churches, built in 1819 and 1866, were both destroyed by fire.

== See also ==
- National Register of Historic Places listings in Cambridge, Massachusetts
