= Avon Hill Historic District =

Historic district in Massachusetts, United States

- U.S. National Register of Historic Places
- U.S. Historic district
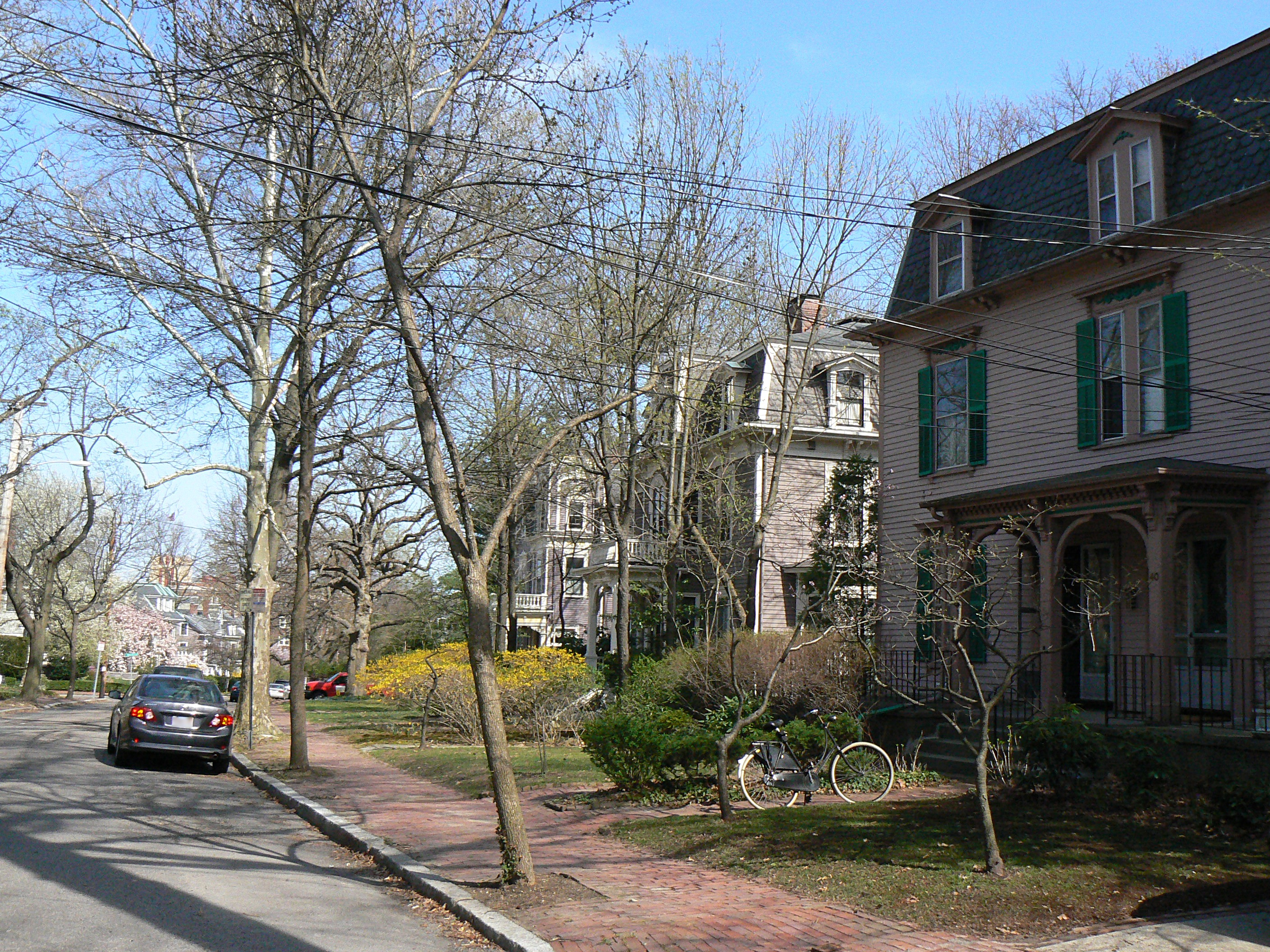
- Arlington Street

- Location within Massachusetts Location within the United States
- Location: Washington and Walnut Aves. and Agassiz, Humboldt, Arlington and Lancaster Sts., Cambridge, Massachusetts
- Coordinates: 42°23′9″N 71°7′21″W
- Area: 20 acres (8.1 ha)
- Architect: Hartwell & Richardson; and others
- Architectural style: Late 19th And 20th Century Revivals, Late Victorian
- MPS: Cambridge MRA
- NRHP reference No.: 83000782
- Added to NRHP: June 30, 1983

The Avon Hill Historic District is a residential historic district near Porter Square in Cambridge, Massachusetts. Set atop Avon Hill southwest of Porter Square, this subdivision, laid out about 1870, contains a concentration of the finest Victorian and Second Empire residential buildings in the city. The district was listed on the National Register of Historic Places in 1983.

== Description and history ==
Avon Hill was originally known as Jones Hill, and was used agriculturally from the mid-17th to mid-19th centuries. The five acres at the top of the hill were sold for development in 1869 to Henry Melendez and Gilbert Dexter, two prominent local businessmen. Each built a fine Second Empire house on Washington Street; that of Melendez survives, while Dexter's burned down in 1939. The area was built out by 1890 with architecturally distinguished houses on large landscaped lots, mainly for the owners of local businesses. Four of the houses were designed by the prominent firm of Hartwell & Richardson, while a number of the others were designed by other local architects. Only two houses in the district were built after 1900.

The historic district extends along Washington Street between Upland and Lancaster Streets, and along Lancaster Street most of the way east to Massachusetts Avenue. It also includes all of Walnut Street, most of Arlington Streets, and a few houses on Agassiz and Humboldt Streets, and on Hillside Avenue, all of which abut one of the other streets. There are 44 properties, all residential. Most of them are large 2 1/2-story wood-frame buildings; one building has brick walls, while another has a combination of brick and wooden finishes. All were originally built as single-family dwellings, but some have since been divided internally into multiple living units.

== See also ==
- National Register of Historic Places listings in Cambridge, Massachusetts
