= Moses T. Stevens =

American politician and textile manufacturer (1825-1907)

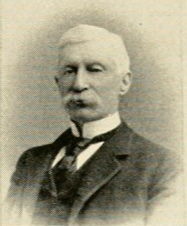

Member of the U.S. House of Representatives from Massachusetts
- In office March 4, 1891 – March 3, 1895
- Preceded by: Frederic T. Greenhalge
- Succeeded by: William Shadrach Knox
- Constituency: 8th district (1891–93); 5th district (1893–95)

Member of the Massachusetts Senate from the Third Essex district
- In office 1868–1870

Member of the Massachusetts House of Representatives
- In office 1861–1862

Personal details
- Born: October 10, 1825 Andover (now North Andover), Massachusetts, U.S.
- Died: March 25, 1907 (aged 81) North Andover, Massachusetts, U.S.
- Party: Democratic
- Spouse: Charlotte Osgood Stevens

Moses Tyler Stevens (October 10, 1825 – March 25, 1907) was an American textile manufacturer and a U.S. Representative from Massachusetts.

== Biography ==
Moses Tyler Stevens was born in North Andover (then a part of Andover), Essex County, Massachusetts on October 10, 1825, the son of textile manufacturer Nathaniel Stevens. He was also the brother of U.S. Representative Charles Abbot Stevens and a cousin of U.S. Representative Isaac Ingalls Stevens.

Stevens attended Franklin Academy, a public school in North Andover. He graduated from Phillips Academy, Andover, in 1842. He attended Dartmouth College in Hanover, New Hampshire for one year in 1842 and 1843. Stevens joined his father's woolen goods manufacturing business after leaving college and became a partner in the business in 1850 under the name Nathaniel Stevens & Son in North Andover.

Stevens married Charlotte Emeline Osgood in 1853. The Stevenses had three sons and three daughters.

Stevens served as member of the Massachusetts House of Representatives in 1861. He served in the Massachusetts State Senate in 1868. He also served as president of the Andover National Bank.

In 1876 Stevens dissolved Nathaniel Stevens & Son. Stevens and his brothers continued the business separately. His three sons, Nathaniel, Samuel, and Moses, became partners in the business in 1886 and the firm became M. T. Stevens & Sons.

Stevens was elected as a Democrat to the Fifty-second and Fifty-third Congresses (March 4, 1891 – March 3, 1895). He served as a member of the House Ways and Means Committee. He was not a candidate for renomination in 1894 to the Fifty-fourth Congress.

After retiring from Congress, Stevens resumed his interests in the manufacturing business. He died in North Andover on March 25, 1907, and was interred in Ridgewood Cemetery. His estate, Osgood Hill, was saved from destruction and is now owned by the town of North Andover. Now listed on the National Register of Historic Places, it serves as a conference center.

== See also ==
- 89th Massachusetts General Court (1868)

U.S. House of Representatives
Preceded by Frederic T. Greenhalge	Member of the U.S. House of Representatives from Massachusetts's 8th congressional district March 4, 1891 – March 3, 1893	Succeeded by Samuel W. McCall
Preceded by Sherman Hoar	Member of the U.S. House of Representatives from Massachusetts's 5th congressional district March 4, 1893 – March 3, 1895	Succeeded by William S. Knox
