= History Cambridge =

Historical society in Massachusetts, USA

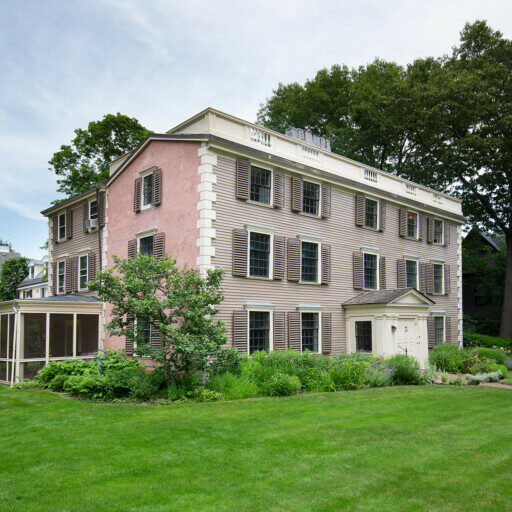
Hooper-Lee-Nichols House, Brattle Street, Cambridge, Massachusetts.

History Cambridge was founded in Cambridge, Massachusetts, in 1905 as the Cambridge Historical Society. Members initially met in private homes and on the Harvard University campus to present lectures on Cambridge history.

In 2021 the Society rebranded as History Cambridge with a broader, more inclusive mission: History Cambridge engages with our city to explore how the past influences the present in order to shape a better future..

Current initiatives include programming focused on annual themes such as Cambridge industry and culinary traditions, oral history projects, research into the lives of enslaved people who may have lived at the organization's Hooper-Lee-Nichols House headquarters, and establishing the Tory Row Anti-Racism Coalition.

== History ==
The Cambridge Historical Society was originally an exclusive membership organization, limited to those who were nominated and elected by current members. Founded in 1905 by Richard Henry Dana III, the Society's first era “reflects a lifestyle that remained virtually unchanged for half a century ... [and was] ... an exclusive club focused on the history of Old [sic] Cambridge," the area around Harvard Square.

Members met four times a year to read papers about significant Cambridge residents, historic buildings, and historic events. These papers were published in the Society's annual Proceedings until 1979.

The early 1950s began “a thirty-year period of change and transition,” most notably:

- In 1953 Frances Emerson gave the Hooper-Lee-Nichols House to the Society. Emerson had received the house as a gift from her father, financier William August White, in 1923, and lived there with her husband William Emerson, the first dean of the MIT School of Architecture. Frances Emerson's gift included a $20,000 endowment and gave the Society a headquarters, meeting site, and home for the storage of its records and collections. Previously the Society's expenses had primarily been for the publication of the Proceedings. Now it was responsible for the upkeep of a significant historical structure. Its yearly budget increased from $3,000 to more than $40,000.
- In 1978 membership was opened to all. The Society preserved the formality of election until 1983, but all who applied and paid the annual fee were welcomed as members. Membership doubled over the late 1970s and early 1980s with income from membership dues helping to fund the preservation and maintenance of the Hooper-Lee-Nichols House. With the opening up of membership, new initiatives were instituted which replaced most of the quarterly meetings: visits to historic sites, walking tours of Cambridge districts, and educational experiences for students.
- In 1983 the Society hired its first employee, a part-time executive director, beginning a period of increased professionalization that mirrored changes occurring throughout the field of historic preservation in the United States.
- In 2021, the Cambridge Historical Society rebranded as History Cambridge, a reflection of its efforts to be the most relevant and responsive historical voice in Cambridge. The organization continues to broaden its focus beyond "Old Cambridge." Recent projects include oral histories about growing up in East Cambridge and the influence of the city's significant Caribbean diaspora.

== Hooper-Lee-Nichols House ==
The Hooper-Lee-Nichols House on Brattle Street was built in 1685 and has been changed by its residents over the years, modified repeatedly to meet the style of the day. While it primarily reflects the Georgian Style of the 18th century, parts of the original 17th-century construction remain and one can see Victorian and Colonial Revival alterations from later generations. It is the second-oldest extant house in Cambridge after the ca. 1681 Cooper–Frost–Austin House.

Like all buildings in Cambridge, Massachusetts, the Hooper-Lee-Nichols House is located on the traditional homelands of the Massachusett people.

Two past owners of the house, Cornelius Waldo (1684–1753/1754) and Joseph Lee (1710–1802), were both enslavers, but no records have yet been uncovered to confirm whether enslaved people worked or lived at the Hooper-Lee-Nichols House.

== Archives and Collections ==
The Cambridge Historical Society began collecting objects in the early 20th century. Prior to the acquisition of the Hooper-Lee-Nichols House in 1957, the collections were stored at various places across Cambridge, such as the homes of the members, the Cambridge Public Library, and libraries at Harvard University.

The collection comprises around 80 manuscript collections including analog photographs, 200 books, 2,000 digital images, and 500 objects. Finding aids are searchable online.

=== Notable Manuscript Collections ===
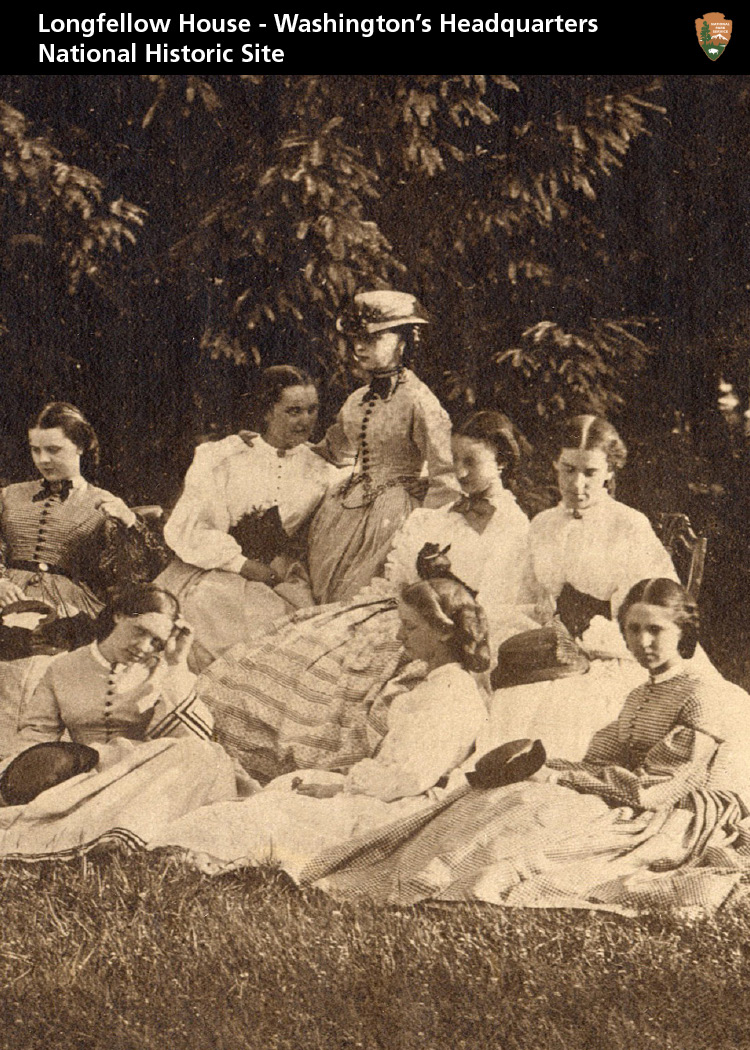
The Bee, 1863, was a group of teenage girls who contributed to the Civil War effort by sewing shirts, knitting socks, and rolling bandages for soldiers. They named themselves The Banks Brigade after Union General Nathaniel Banks. This was shortened to The B.B. and finally The Bee.

- Samuel Francis Batchelder Papers, 1765–1930. Batchelder (1870–1927) was an author, inventor, and historian.
- Mercy Scollay Papers, 1775–1824. Scollay was the fiancée of United States founding father Joseph Warren, a major general who died at the Battle of Bunker Hill.
- Bull Curtis Papers, 1830–1910. Ole Bull was a celebrated Norwegian violinist; his wife Sara Chapman Bull was a champion of Ole's legacy and an organizer of the "Cambridge Conferences," cultural and intellectual gatherings at the couple's Brattle Street home.
- The Bee Records, 1861–1934. Founded as the Banks Brigade, this group of 16 teenage girls gathered weekly to make clothing and bandages for Civil War soldiers. After the war they became known as The Bee and continued to meet and make supplies for the new Cambridge Hospital as well as later war relief efforts.
- Hollis G. Gerrish Papers, 1865–2002. Gerrish was the owner and president of the Squirrel Nut Company at 4 Boardman Street, manufacturers of Squirrel Nut Caramels during a time when Cambridge was a hub of candy manufacturing in the US.
- Grand Army of the Republic (GAR) P. Stearns Davis, Post 57, East Cambridge Records, 1867–1920. Records and correspondence about the East Cambridge post of the GAR, a Civil War veterans' support and advocacy organization.
- The Harvard Square Defense Fund Records, 1979−2007. Records and correspondence relating to this community-led coalition that worked to preserve the character and community of Harvard Square by vetting commercial development, championing local business, and helping preserve buildings with historic and social significance.

=== Other Notable Collections and Research ===
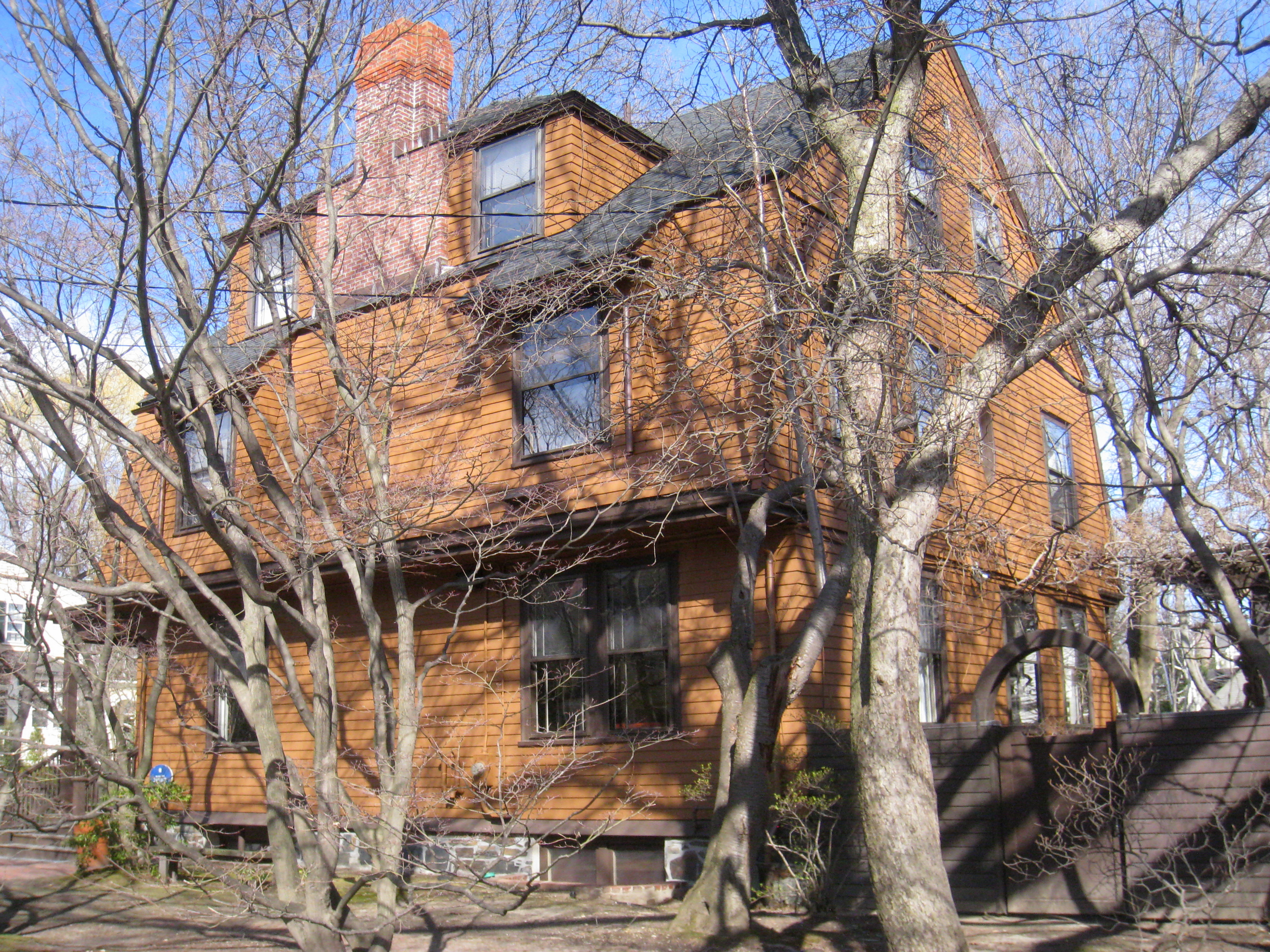
Howe House, 6 Appleton Street, Cambridge, Massachusetts, USA. This building is listed on the National Register of Historic Places. According to a blue historical plaque on the building, it was from 1889-1964 home to Lois Lilley Howe (1864-1964), America's first woman architect.

- Lois Lilley Howe Photographic Collection 1884–1912: Howe (1864–1964) was the founder in 1893 of the only all-female architectural firm in Boston, one of the earliest in America, and the first woman to be elected a fellow of the American Institute of Architects.
- William James: Self-guided tours of significant locations in the life of William James, a philosopher, teacher, and the so-called father of American psychology. James lived and worked in Cambridge for more than 50 years.
- Inner Belt History Hub: Papers, photographs, and research related to the proposed Inner Belt, an eight-lane highway that would have run through Cambridge's Central Square and many other neighborhoods in Somerville and Boston. It is one of the nation's first examples of community resistance to infrastructure development.
- Joyce Chen: Research, photos, and remembrances of restaurateur and WGBH-TV presenter Joyce Chen, who emigrated from Beijing in 1947 and popularized Chinese regional cooking for an American audience.

== Organizational Structure and Membership ==
History Cambridge is a 501(c)3 non-profit organization governed by a Board of Directors and administered by a full-time executive director, part-time program and communications managers, and many volunteers.

Membership was initially restricted to those who were nominated and elected by existing members of the Cambridge Historical Society. In 1978 membership was opened to all who applied and paid annual dues. As of 2021, in conjunction with the Society's rebranding as History Cambridge, all formal membership programs were dissolved. History Cambridge relies on individual, corporate, and foundation donors for financial support.

== Publications ==
In addition to monthly newsletters, History Cambridge currently publishes a regular “Did You Know?" column in the online newspaper Cambridge Day.

The Proceedings of the Cambridge Historical Society from 1906 through 1979 are archived online.

- Saving Cambridge: Historic Preservation in America's Innovation City, Cambridge Historical Society, 2013.
- Rediscovering the Hooper-Lee-Nichols House, Michael Kenney and Gavin W. Kleespies, eds, 2010.
- A City's Life and Times: Cambridge in the 20th Century, Daphne Abeel, ed., 2006.
- 100 Years of Cambridge History: Highlights from the Collection of the Cambridge Historical Society, Lindsay Leard-Coolidge, 2005
- Essays on Cambridge History: Proceedings, 1980-1985, Cambridge Historical Society, 1998.
- Cambridge Rindge and Latin school: Yesterday and Today, John Langone, 1998.
- "For the Entertainment of Strangers": The Inns & Pubs of Cambridge, George H. Hanford, 1997.
- Cambridge on the Cutting Edge: Innovators and Inventions,, Cambridge Historical Society, 1995.

== See also ==
- Hooper-Lee-Nichols House
- Tory Row
- National Register of Historic Places listings in Cambridge, Massachusetts
- Timeline of Cambridge, Massachusetts
