= Tory Row =

Coordinates: 42°22′35.3″N 71°7′35.7″W

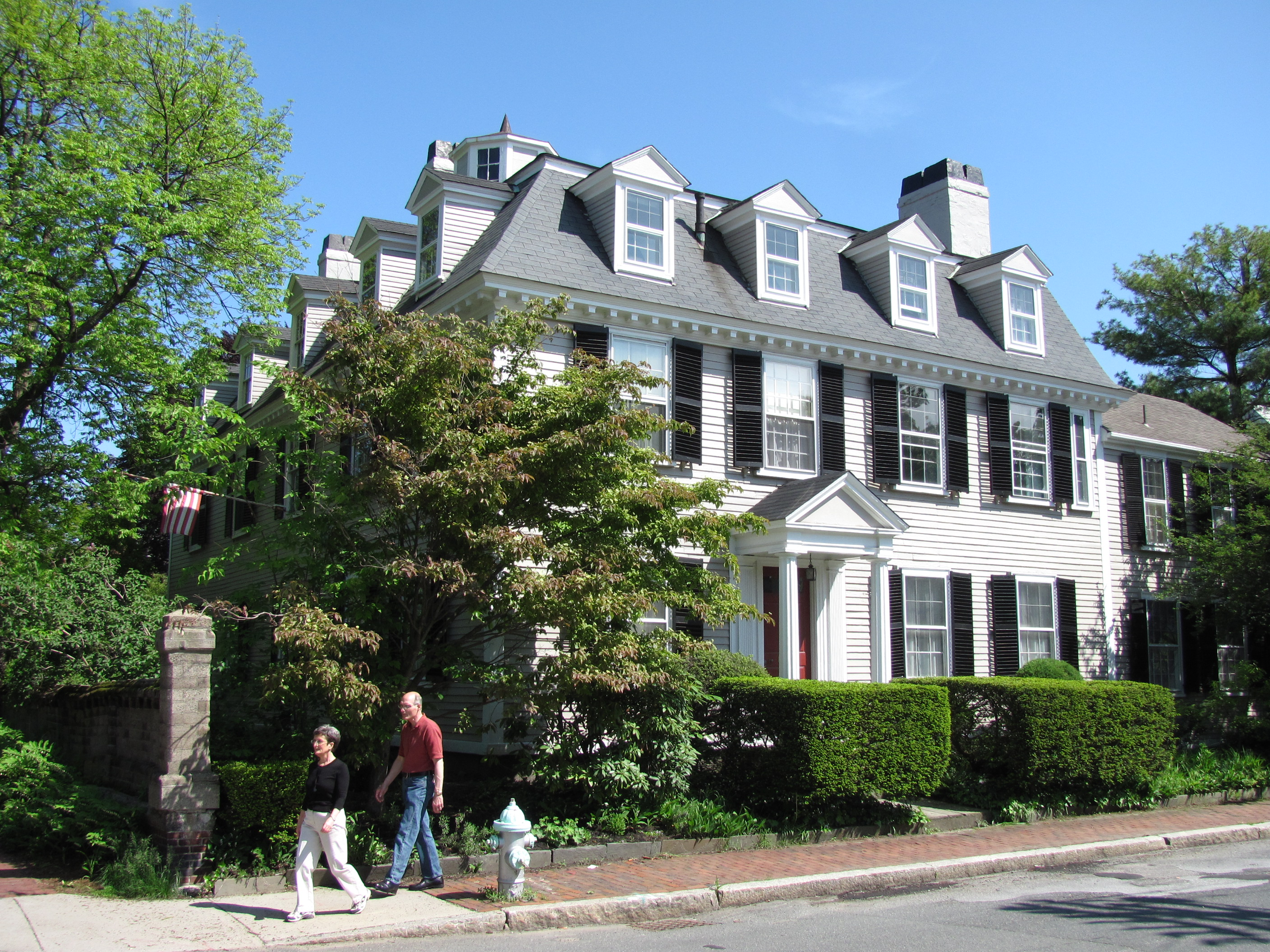
Henry Vassall House

Tory Row is the nickname historically given by some to the part of Brattle Street in Cambridge, Massachusetts, where many Loyalists had mansions at the time of the American Revolutionary War, and given by others to seven Colonial mansions along Brattle Street. Its historic buildings from the 18th century include the William Brattle House (42 Brattle Street) and the Longfellow House–Washington's Headquarters National Historic Site (105 Brattle Street). Samuel Atkins Eliot, writing in 1913 of the seven Colonial mansions making up Tory Row, called the area "not only one of the most beautiful but also one of the most historic streets in America." Owners of Caribbean slave plantations, including the Vassall and Royall families, built the mansions as a statement of the "incredible wealth" they had amassed from slave labor in Jamaica and Antigua, and they enslaved an unusually high number of people on the premises.

== Seven historic houses of Tory Row ==
The seven houses described by Eliot as making up Tory Row are as follows:

- The Brattle estate (42 Brattle Street) also known as the William Brattle House, now the home of the Cambridge Center for Adult Education
- Estate of Mrs. Henry Vassall (94 Brattle Street) also known as the Henry Vassall House
- Estate of Mr. John Vassal (105 Brattle Street) also known as the "Vassall-Craigie-Longfellow House," now the Longfellow House–Washington's Headquarters National Historic Site)
- Lechmere-Sewall house (149 Brattle Street) also known as the "Lechmere-Riedesel House" or the "Lechmere-Sewall-Riedesel House"
- Judge Joseph Lee's house (159 Brattle Street) now the Hooper-Lee-Nichols House, home to History Cambridge, formerly the Cambridge Historical Society
- Fayerweather House (175 Brattle Street), built by George Ruggles, also called the Ruggles-Fayerweather House
- Thomas Oliver house (33 Elmwood Avenue), also known as the Oliver-Gerry-Lowell House or as Elmwood. This house, although considered a part of Brattle Street's Tory Row, has its address on nearby Elmwood Avenue, which had formerly been part of Brattle Street.

== Fate of the Tory Row houses after the American Revolution ==
According to Edward Abbott, writing in 1859,

Five of these estates were subsequently confiscated and sold by the commonwealth: the estates of Lechmere (144 acres) and Oliver (96 acres) to Andrew Cabot, Esq., of Salem, November 24, 1779; the estate of Sewall (44 acres) to Thomas Lee of Pomfret, Conn., December 7, 1779; .. and the estate of Vassall (116 acres) to Nathaniel Tracy, Esq., of Newburyport, June 28, 1781. ... The heirs of Borland and the Widow Vassall succeeded to the ownership of their estates in Cambridge... General Brattle conveyed all his real estate in Cambridge, December 13, 1774, to his only surviving son, Major Thomas Brattle...By the persevering efforts of Mrs. Katherine Wendell, the only surviving daughter of General Brattle, the estate was preserved from confiscation, and was recovered by Major Brattle after his return from Europe,—having been proscribed in 1778, and having subsequently exhibited satisfactory evidence of his friendship to his country and its political independence.

Two other Tory Row houses, according to the same source, were not confiscated. Judge Lee (#159) returned from Boston after the war and lived in his house "unmolested until his death." Captain Ruggles (#175), before leaving the neighborhood, had sold his estate in 1774 to Thomas Fayerweather.

== See also ==
- Old Cambridge Historic District, which includes Tory Row
