= Ash Street Historic District =

Historic district in Massachusetts, United States

- U.S. National Register of Historic Places
- U.S. Historic district
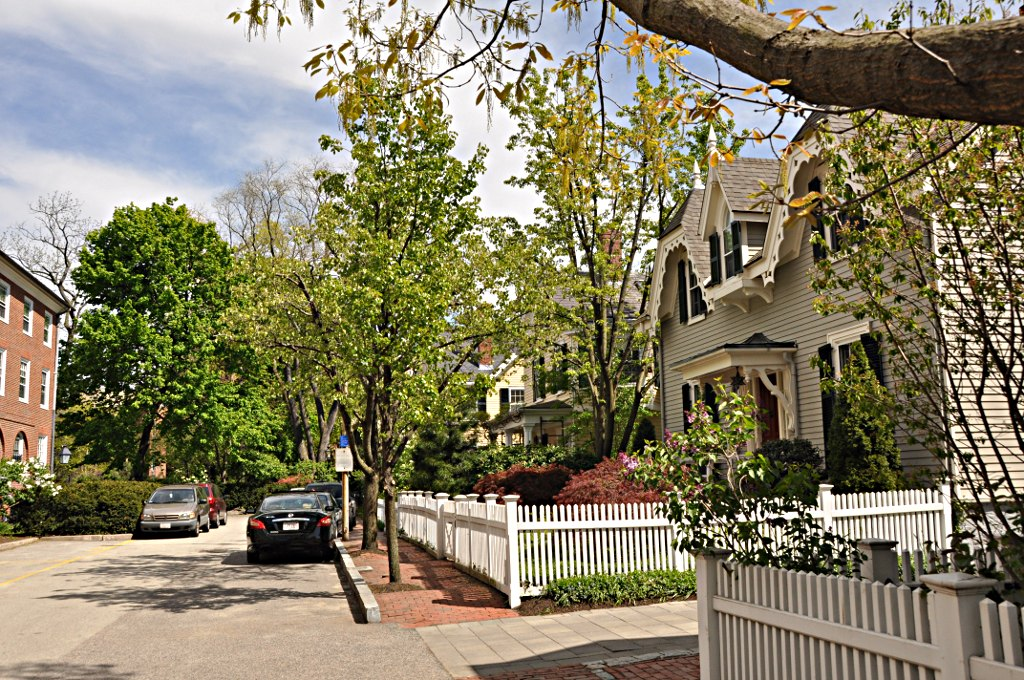
- Ash Street Place

- Location within Massachusetts Location within the United States
- Location: Cambridge, Massachusetts
- Coordinates: 42°22′59″N 71°7′34″W
- Built: 1858
- Architect: Johnson, Philip; et al.
- Architectural style: Greek Revival, Italianate, International Style
- MPS: Cambridge MRA
- NRHP reference No.: 82001916
- Added to NRHP: April 13, 1982

The Ash Street Historic District Cambridge, Massachusetts is a residential historic district on Ash Street and Ash Street Place between Brattle and Mount Auburn Streets in Cambridge, Massachusetts, off Brattle Street just west of Harvard Square. The district consists of ten well-preserved houses, most of which were built between 1850 and 1890. The district was listed on the National Register of Historic Places in 1982.

== Description and history ==
Ash Street is located on the western edge of Harvard Square, extending south from Brattle Street to Memorial Drive. The Ash Street Historic District is located on the northern half of the road, between Brattle and Mount Auburn Streets, including Ash Street Place, a short stub extending eastward. It directly abuts the Old Cambridge Historic District, which lies to the north.

Properties on Ash Street are densely built on small lots. The district includes five houses on Ash Street, four with Mount Auburn Street addresses (located at the four corners of the junction), and one on Ash Street Place. Eight were built between 1850 and 1890, and are stylistically diverse. The oldest house in the district is the 1828 Henry Nowell House at 19 Ash Street; it was originally located on Brattle Street, and was moved to its present location in 1858.

The oldest house to be built in the district is an 1848 Gothic Revival cottage at 6 Ash Street Place; the only 20th-century building in the district is the 1941 house of architect Philip Johnson at 9 Ash Street. This house was designed and built while Johnson was studying at Harvard, and is one of the city's earliest International Style buildings.

== See also ==
- National Register of Historic Places listings in Cambridge, Massachusetts
