= Harvard brick =

Construction technique

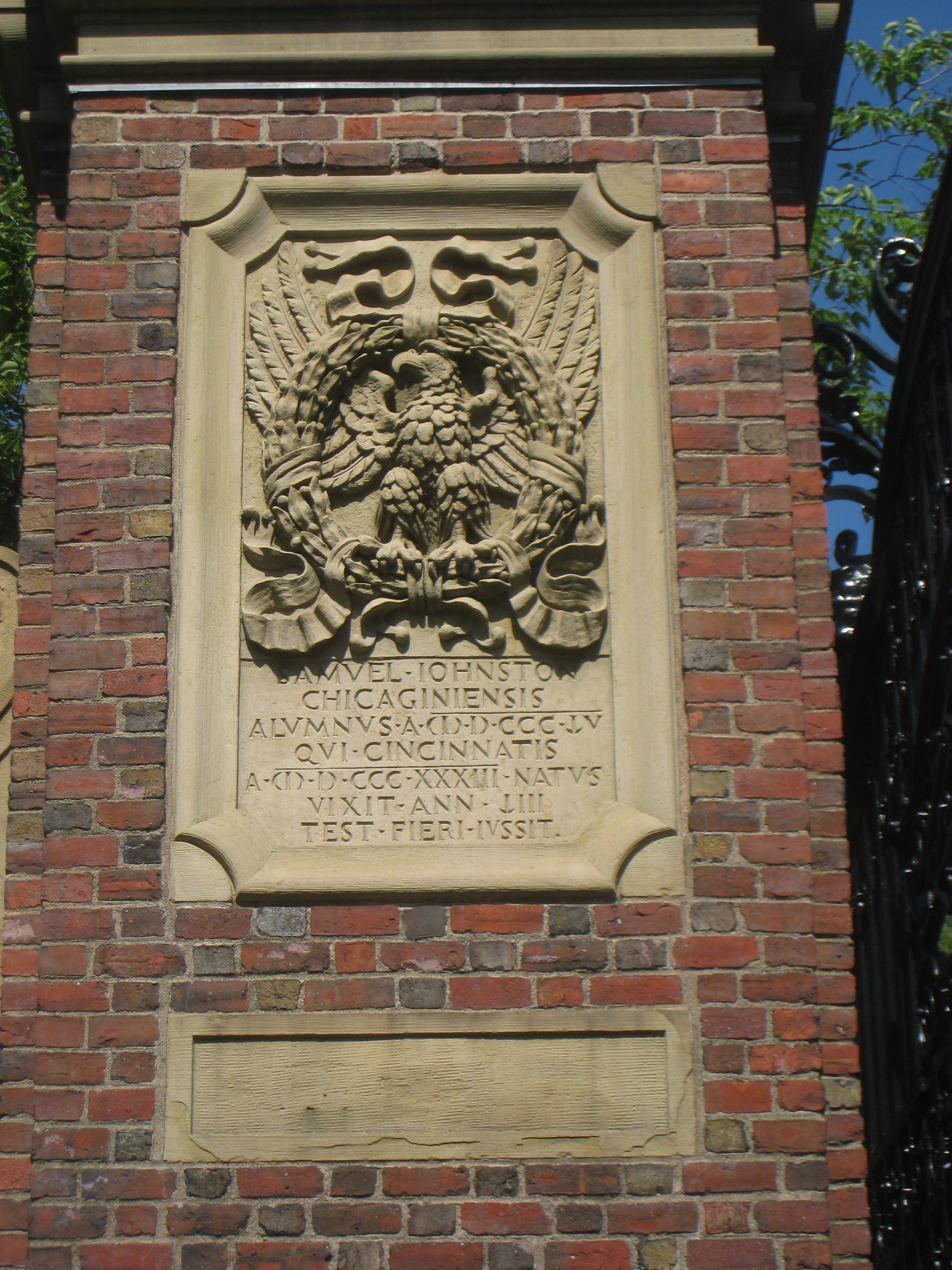
Detail of the Johnston Gate, showing the overburnt faces of bricks arranged in the "Flemish bond" pattern

Harvard brick is a water-struck brick and a technique for building brick facades in imitation of much older ones. The use of waterstruck bricks with visible defects was made popular by architect Charles McKim in conjunction with the construction (1889) of the Johnston Gate, the "oldest and grandest" of the gates surrounding Harvard Yard in Cambridge, Massachusetts. "McKim made the gate harmonious with the Yard's older buildings ... To convey a sense of age, he looked for 'culls', bricks that had been turned green, tan, or black by excessive heat. He laid them out in a Flemish bond, thus achieving "just the variegated color and texture of the weathered walls of neighboring Massachusetts and Harvard Halls."

While originally the term "Harvard brick" was applied only to the bricks with overburnt faces, the definition became looser with time. The popularity of the Harvard water-struck brick caused the New England Brick Company (NEBCO) to continue manufacturing bricks in this inefficient technique (it required a lot of manual labor) all the way to 1930. NEBCO bricks were extensively used in construction of Georgian Revival buildings in the 1910s-1920s Harvard. The elegant-sounding name was also used for branding high-end, but otherwise unrelated, brick products.

== Sources ==
- Bunting, Bainbridge (1985). Harvard: An Architectural History. Harvard University Press. ISBN 978-0-674-37291-7.
- Long, G. Burton (1978). "The Romance of Brick". The Proceedings of the Cambridge Historical Society. 42. History Cambridge.
- United States Bureau of Mines (1968). "harvard brick". A Dictionary of Mining, Mineral, and Related Terms. U.S. Bureau of Mines.
