= Old Cambridge Historic District =

Historic district in Massachusetts, United States

- U.S. National Register of Historic Places
- U.S. Historic district
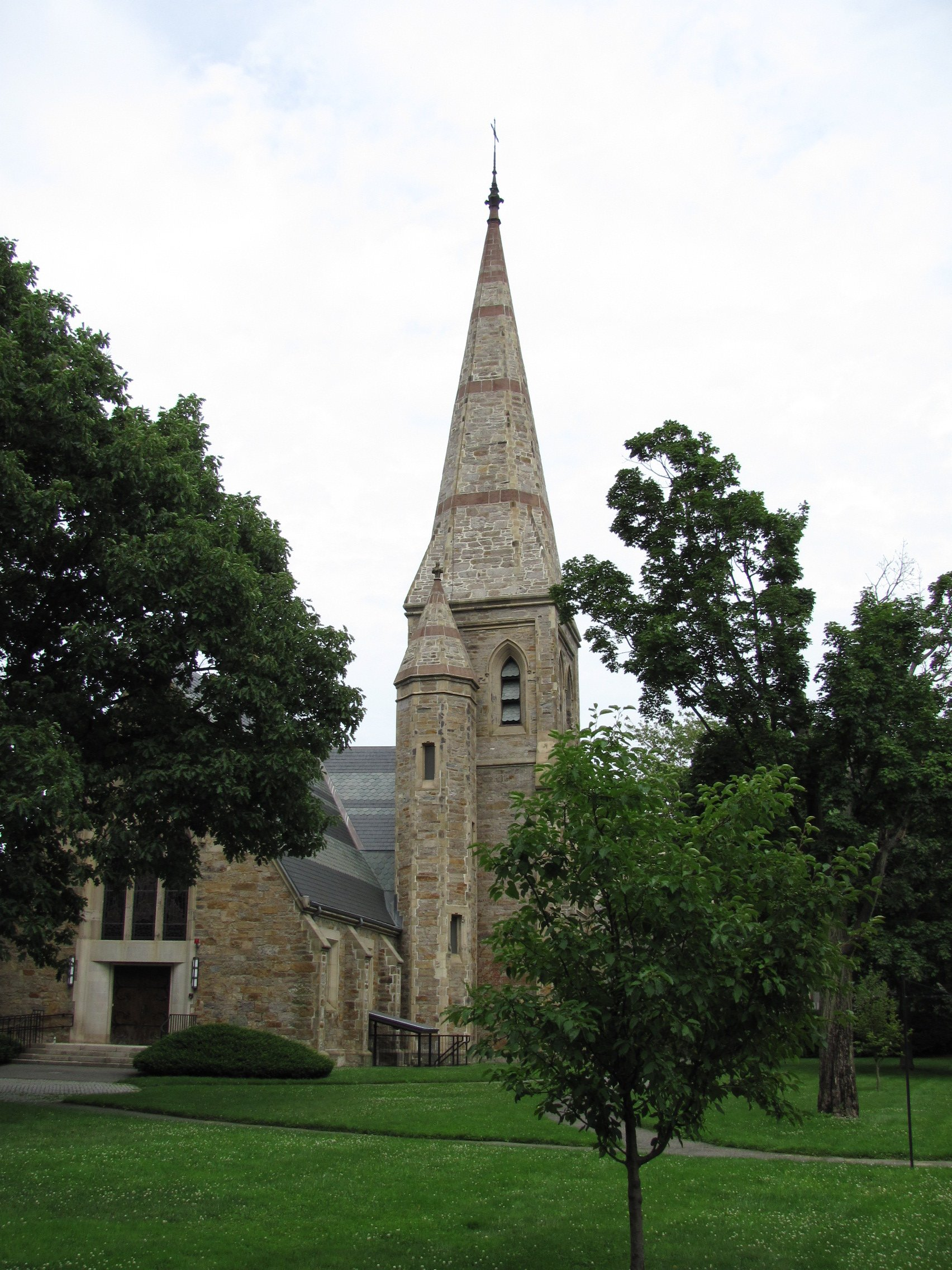
- St. John's Chapel; Episcopal Divinity School

- Location within Massachusetts Location within the United States
- Location: Cambridge, Massachusetts
- Coordinates: 42°22′37″N 71°8′25″W
- Area: 52 acres (21 ha)
- Architectural style: Late 19th and 20th century Revivals, Greek Revival, Late Victorian
- MPS: Cambridge MRA
- NRHP reference No.: 83000821
- Added to NRHP: June 30, 1983

The Old Cambridge Historic District is a historic district encompassing a residential neighborhood of Cambridge, Massachusetts that dates to colonial times. It is located just west of Harvard Square, and includes all of the properties on Brattle Street west of Mason Street to Fresh Pond Parkway, all of the properties on Mason Street and Elmwood Avenue, and nearby properties on Craigie Street. The district includes five National Historic Landmarks: Elmwood, the Reginald A. Daly House, the Oliver Hastings House, the Mary Fiske Stoughton House, and the Longfellow House–Washington's Headquarters National Historic Site, as well as several other houses listed separately on the National Register. The district follows the general route of the Watertown Path, an early colonial road that supposedly followed a Native American trail. This portion of the way became known as Tory Row during the American Revolution, because many of the fine mansions lining it were owned by Loyalists. In the 19th and early 20th centuries it continued by a fashionable location, and now features a number of architecturally significant buildings. It includes 215 contributing buildings and one other contributing sites over an area of 52 acres (21 ha). One included building is the Cambridge Historical Society's offices, which are in the NRHP-listed Hooper-Lee Nichols House, located at 159 Brattle Street.

The district was added to the National Register of Historic Places (NRHP) in 1983. It abuts a number of other historic districts, including the Cambridge Common Historic District, the Ash Street Historic District, and the Berkeley Street Historic District.

== See also ==
- National Register of Historic Places listings in Cambridge, Massachusetts
