= Brattle Street (Cambridge, Massachusetts) =

Street in Cambridge, Massachusetts, US

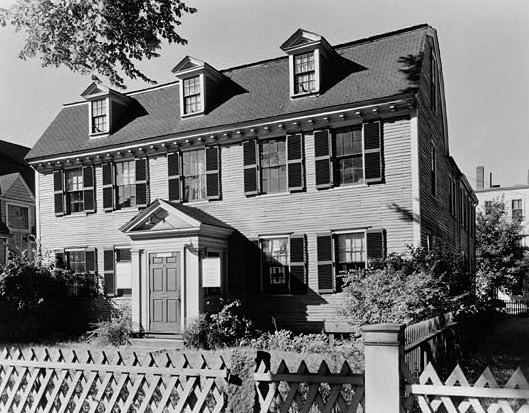
- 42 Brattle Street, whose Loyalist owner William Brattle gave the street his name
- West end: Mt. Auburn Street
- East end: Massachusetts Avenue

Brattle Street in Cambridge, Massachusetts, called the "King's Highway" or "Tory Row" before the American Revolutionary War, is the site of many buildings of historical interest, including the modernist glass-and-concrete building that housed the Design Research store, and a Georgian mansion where George Washington and Henry Wadsworth Longfellow both lived (though at different times), as well as John Vassall and his seven slaves including Darby Vassall. Samuel Atkins Eliot, writing in 1913 about the seven Colonial mansions of Brattle Street's "Tory Row," called the area "not only one of the most beautiful but also one of the most historic streets in America." "As a fashionable address it is doubtful if any other residential street in this country has enjoyed such long and uninterrupted prestige."

== Origins of Brattle Street as a forest path ==
Even before the settlement known as "Newe Towne" was planted on the site of the modern Cambridge, at the first good Charles River crossing west of Boston, the path or trail from Charlestown to Watertown ran past the site of the current Harvard Square and westward along much of what is now Brattle Street.

In early 17th century Newe Towne, according to historian John Fiske, "On the north side of Braintree Street, opposite Dunster, and thence eastward about as far as opposite the site of Linden, stood a row of six houses, and at their back was the ancient forest. Through this forest ran the trail or path from Charlestown to Watertown, nearly coinciding with the crooked line Kirkland - Mason - Brattle - Elmwood - Mount Auburn; this was the first highway from the seaboard into the inland country." Where the current Ash Street intersects the current Brattle Street stood Newe Towne's West Gate, a palisaded fence to keep cattle out of the town.

== Eighteenth-century Brattle Street and "Tory Row" ==
During the 18th century, seven mansions were built along the main road to Watertown (which included not only the modern Brattle Street but also what is now Elmwood Avenue). Because many of their owners were Loyalists during the American Revolution, these houses got the nickname "Tory Row". During and after the Revolution, many were confiscated by George Washington's army. Some of these were, however, later restored to the families of their former owners.

Even as the Tory Row mansions were being built, however, the forest remained a nearby presence in Cambridge. As late as 1759, a Harvard student writing home reported "many bears killed at Cambridge and the neighboring towns about this time, and several persons killed by them." In the same year, 1759, the house at 105 Brattle Street was built, of which more below.

Provincial militia leader William Brattle, at one time the wealthiest man in the Massachusetts Bay Colony, is thought to be the Brattle for whom the street was named. He had the house at 42 Brattle Street built for him in 1727. Brattle tried to keep peace between patriots and the British, but after the 1774 incident known as the Powder Alarm, an angry mob surrounded his house and forced him to flee.

The Baroness Riedesel, whose husband commanded the Brunswick regiments that supported the British, spent much of the wartime "imprisoned" at 149 Brattle Street, the old Tory Row mansion now commonly called the Lechmere-Sewall-Riedesel House. She has left a charming painting in words of the Tory society on Brattle Street before the Revolution came: "Never had I chanced upon such an agreeable situation. Seven families, who were connected with each other, partly by the ties of relationship and partly by affection, had here farms, gardens, and magnificent houses, and, not far off, plantations of fruit. The owners of these were in the habit of daily meeting each other in the afternoons, now at the house of one and now at another, and making themselves merry with music and the dance,— living in prosperity, united and happy, until, alas! this ruinous war separated them, and left all their houses desolate, except two, the proprietors of which were also soon obliged to flee."

== 105 Brattle Street, Washington, and the Longfellows ==
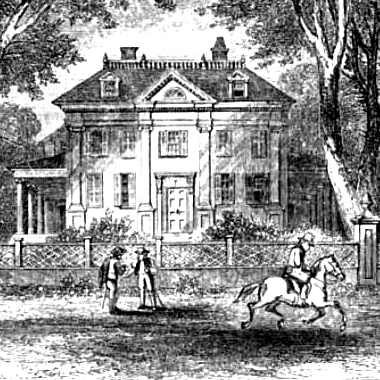
105 Brattle Street, once General Washington's headquarters, later the home of Longfellow

Another Loyalist who fled Cambridge in 1774 was John Vassall Jr., owner of the handsome yellow Georgian house at 105 Brattle Street, built for him in 1759. This vacant house was turned over in 1775 to George Washington, who took command of the Continental Army there. Washington used the rooms at the building's southeast corner, upstairs and down, for his private apartments, where his wife Martha Washington joined him in December, 1775. Washington lived in the house until July 1776.

In the summer of 1837, a young Harvard professor named Henry Wadsworth Longfellow began renting some rooms in the house at 105 Brattle Street, now being run as a boarding house by the widow of Andrew Craigie, Washington's Apothecary General. Longfellow proudly wrote to a friend, "I live in a great house which looks like an Italian villa: have two large rooms opening into each other. They were once Gen. Washington's chambers".

In 1843, Longfellow was given the house as a wedding gift by his father-in-law Nathan Appleton, when Longfellow married Nathan's daughter Frances. The price of the house at that time was $10,000. Longfellow's wife Frances, also called Fanny, was the first American woman to receive anesthesia during childbirth, giving birth in the house at 105 Brattle Street.

Longfellow and his wife Frances had two sons as well as the three daughters memorialized in his 1860 poem "The Children's Hour" as "grave Alice, and laughing Allegra, and Edith with golden hair." All three daughters later had houses on Brattle Street, Alice inheriting her parents' home while Allegra and Edith had stylish homes built for them, at 113 and 115 Brattle Street, respectively, in 1887.

== Brattle Street in the 19th century ==
During the early days of the 19th century, Brattle Street saw just a few houses added to the "Tory Row" mansions on its northern side, while the south side was still "meadow-land and orchards."

Between 1805 and 1812, a decision was made and finally carried out to straighten the end of Brattle Street, where it joins Mount Auburn Street, renaming a part of the original Tory Row "Elmwood Avenue." As a result, the Brattle Street of today is different from the original Watertown highway, whose original route went along what is now Elmwood Avenue. This is why "Elmwood," one of the seven original Tory Row mansions ("on Elmwood Avenue, then a part of the Watertown highway, which here made a sharp serpentine sweep to the southward, lived Lieutenant-Governor Oliver") no longer has a Brattle Street address.

James Russell Lowell, writing in 1868, conjured up Brattle Street (the "Old Road") as it was in the 1830s, seen from the top of a hill near where Mount Auburn Hospital stands now:

On your right, the Charles slipped smoothly through green and purple salt-meadows, darkened, here and there, with the blossoming black-grass as with a stranded cloud-shadow. Over these marshes, level as water, but without its glare, and with softer and more soothing gradations of perspective, the eye was carried to a horizon of softly-rounded hills. To your left hand, upon the Old Road, you saw some half-dozen dignified old houses of the colonial time, all comfortably fronting southward. If it were early June, the rows of horse-chestnuts along the fronts of these houses showed, through every crevice of their dark heap of foliage, and on the end of every drooping limb, a cone of pearly flowers, while the hill behind was white or rosy with the crowding blooms of various fruit-trees. There is no sound, unless a horseman clatters over the loose planks of the bridge.

As the 19th century lengthened, Brattle Street continued to attract wealthy families who built houses in the newest architectural styles, such as Greek Revival (#112 built in 1846), Stick style (#92, built in 1881), and Colonial Revival (#115, built in 1887). The Shingle style Mary Fiske Stoughton House at 90 Brattle Street has been called "the best suburban wooden house in America ... comparable only to the finest of Frank Lloyd Wright's."

== Brattle Street after 1900 ==
In 1969, the architect owners of the Design Research store created a four-story glass and concrete Modernist building at 48 Brattle Street to showcase the Scandinavian clothing and housewares they had been selling on Brattle Street since 1953.

During the summer months, Harvard Square and Brattle Square host many street performers and buskers. The Fokin Memorial sculpture (2001) at One Brattle Square is 10-inch brass representation of a favorite puppet once used there by puppeteer Igor Folkin.

Gregory Corso's first book of poems is titled "Vestal Lady on Brattle: A Collection of Poems Written in Cambridge, Massachusetts 1954-1955."

== Notable sites on modern Brattle Street ==
- 40: Brattle Hall*
- 42: William Brattle House*^
- 48: Modernist glass and concrete building built in 1969 for the Design Research store (founded on Brattle Street in 1953)
- 54: Dexter Pratt House*
- 64: American Repertory Theatre
- 85: The Norton-Johnson-Burleigh House (1847)
- 90: Mary Fiske Stoughton House*
- 92: The Misses Sarah and Emma Cary House (1881), an example of the Stick style in Queen Anne architecture
- 94: "Estate of Mrs. Henry Vassall," also known as the Henry Vassall House^
- 99: The former Episcopal Divinity School, founded in 1867, whose St. John's Chapel (1868) was modeled on an English parish church
- 101: Oliver Hastings House*
- 105: Former estate of John Vassall and longtime home of Henry Wadsworth Longfellow, also known as the "Vassall-Craigie-Longfellow House," now the Longfellow House–Washington's Headquarters National Historic Site^
- 112: Greek Revival house (1846) at the corner of Willard Street
- 113: The Edith Longfellow Dana House (1887), now home of the Lincoln Institute of Land Policy.
- 114: Neo-Georgian house (1903) designed by John W. Ames
- 115: Annie Longfellow Thorp House (1887), a Colonial Revival house built in 1887 for Longfellow's daughter Annie Allegra, inspired by her father's Georgian house
- 149: Lechmere-Sewall house also known as the "Lechmere-Riedesel House" or the "Lechmere-Sewall-Riedesel House"^
- 159: Hooper-Lee-Nichols House now home of the Cambridge Historical Society^
- 175: Ruggles-Fayerwether House^
- Footnote: Items marked with * are also included in the National Register of Historic Places listings in Cambridge, Massachusetts. Note that the entire Old Cambridge Historic District, which runs in an irregular pattern along Brattle Street, is also one of the listings in the National Register of Historic Places. Items marked with ^ are among the seven "Tory Row" houses listed by Samuel Atkins Eliot in 1913.

== See also ==
- National Register of Historic Places listings in Cambridge, Massachusetts
- Old Cambridge Historic District
