= Reginald A. Daly House =

Historic house in Massachusetts, United States

- U.S. National Register of Historic Places
- U.S. National Historic Landmark
- U.S. Historic district – Contributing property
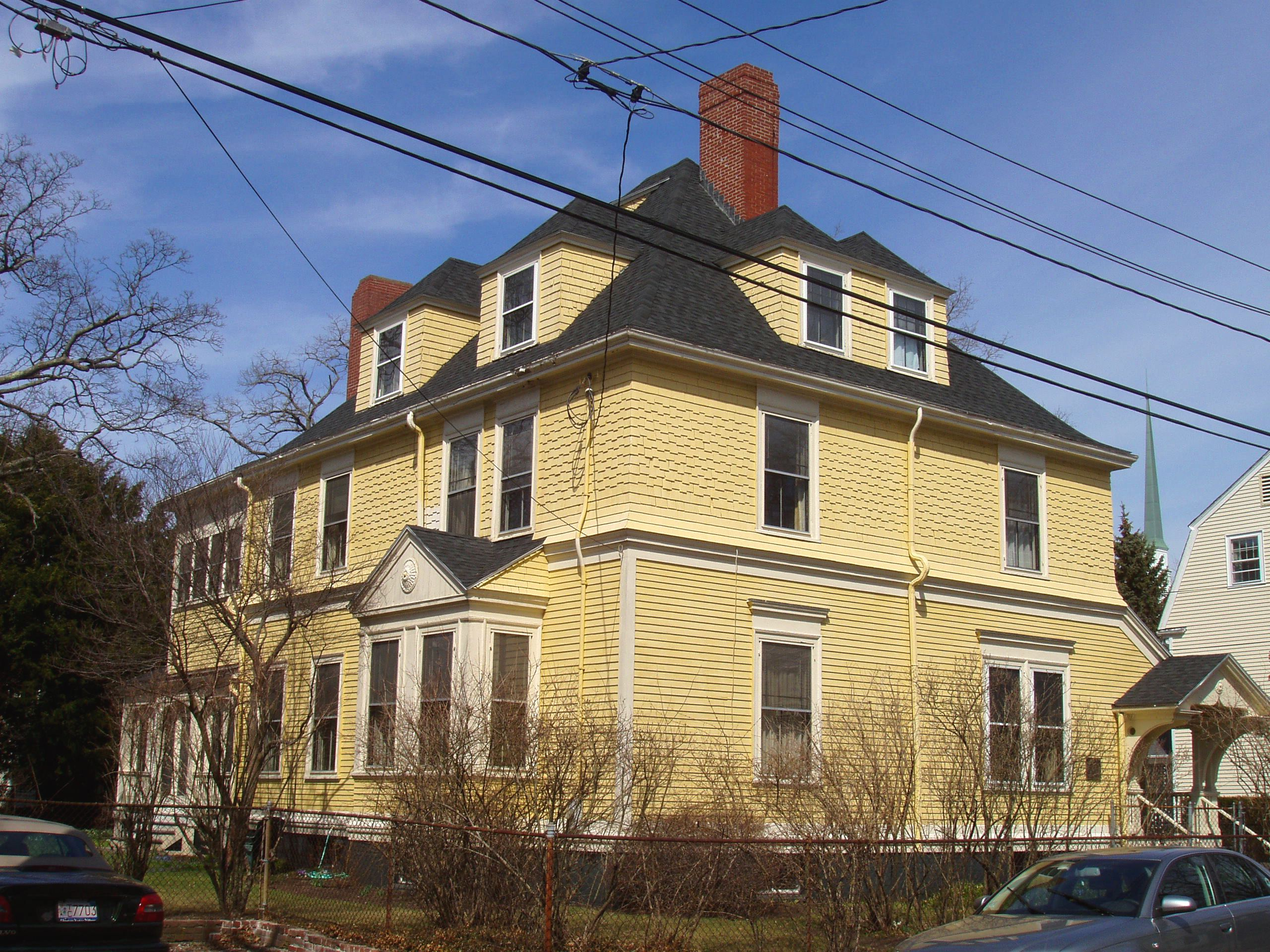
- Reginald A. Daly House.

- Location within Massachusetts Location within the United States
- Location: 23 Hawthorn Street, Cambridge, Massachusetts
- Coordinates: 42°22′31.4″N 71°7′34.6″W
- Built: 1885
- Architect: Van Brunt and Howe
- Architectural style: Queen Anne
- Part of: Old Cambridge Historic District (ID83000821)
- NRHP reference No.: 76000305

Significant dates
- Added to NRHP: January 7, 1976
- Designated NHL: January 7, 1976
- Designated CP: June 30, 1983

The Reginald A. Daly House is a historic house located in Cambridge, Massachusetts. It is a National Historic Landmark, notable for its association with Reginald Aldworth Daly (1871–1957), an eminent geologist, Penrose Medal winner, and Harvard University professor.

The house is a two-story wood-frame structure, estimated to have been built in the 1880s or 1890s. The house is styled in a Queen Anne/Shingle style, and was designed by the distinguished firm of Van Brunt and Howe. Van Brunt headed America's first architecture school, at MIT, and designed Harvard's Memorial Hall and the Cambridge Public Library, among many other Boston area buildings. Its interior had (as of its designation in 1976) not been significantly altered since Daly's death. Reginald Daly was born in Ontario, and was educated at Victoria College (now the University of Toronto). He then engaged in graduate studies at Harvard, earning an MA. and PhD in geology. In 1908 Daly began teaching at the Massachusetts Institute of Technology, and in 1912 he joined the faculty of Harvard, where he remained for the rest of his life. He purchased this house in 1910. Daly's contributions to the field of geology were wide-ranging: he was one of the first to synthesize a consistent theory of igneous rocks, based on an extensive analysis of a large body of physical evidence. He was also instrumental in bringing physics and chemistry into the study of geology. He was widely recognized by his peers, and received numerous honors, including the first honorary degree granted by his alma mater, Victoria College.

The house was designated a National Historic Landmark in 1976, and was listed on the National Register of Historic Places. It was further included in the Old Cambridge Historic District in 1983.

== See also ==
- List of National Historic Landmarks in Massachusetts
- National Register of Historic Places listings in Cambridge, Massachusetts
