= Cambridge Center for Adult Education =

Adult education non-profit in Cambridge, Massachusetts

Coordinates: 42°22′25.3″N 71°7′17.6″W

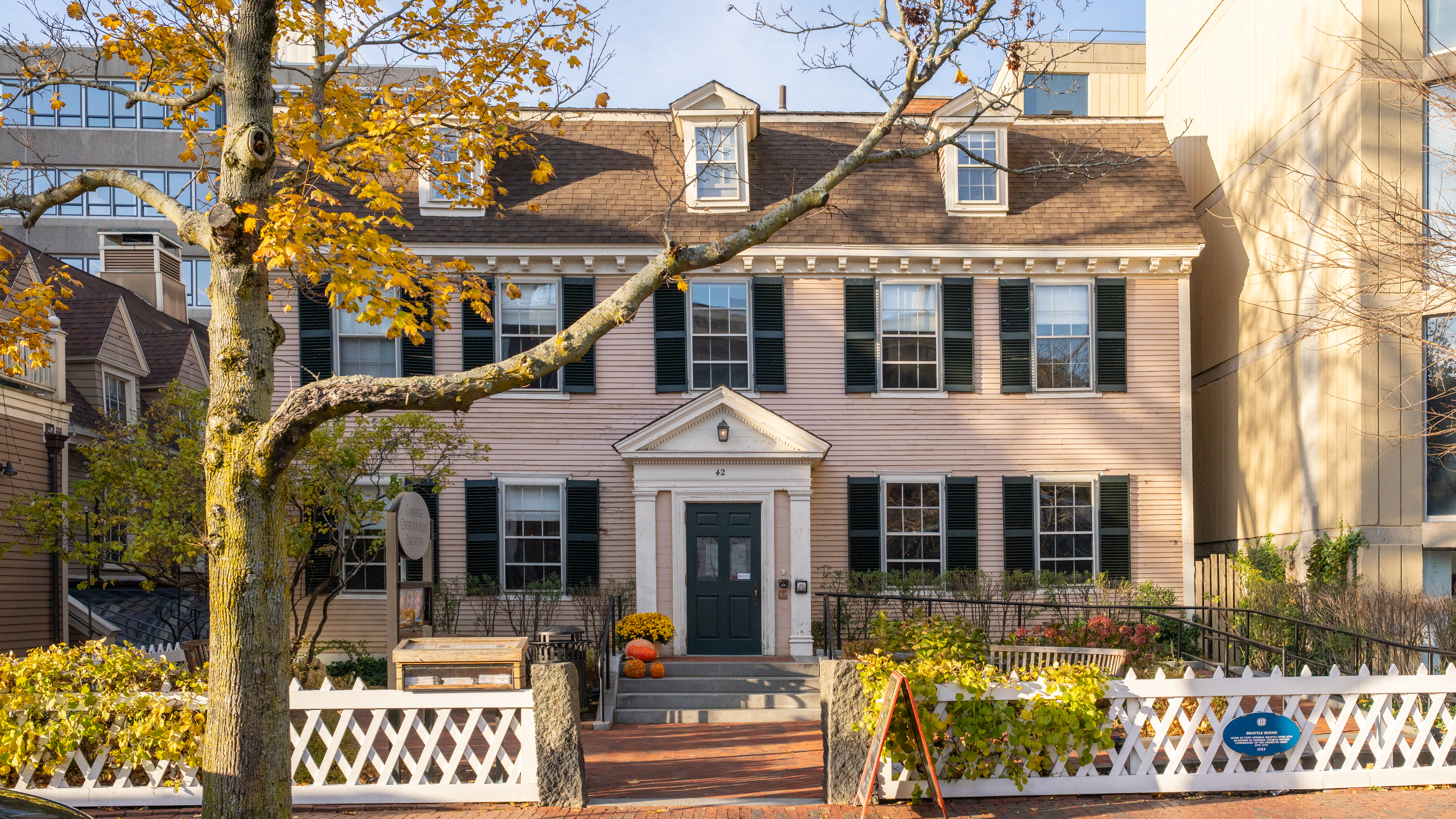
- Cambridge Center for Adult Education, William Brattle House at 42 Brattle Street near Harvard Square (2025)
- Predecessor: Cambridge Social Union, founded 1871, incorporated 1876
- Formation: 1938; independent in 1941
- Location: 42 Brattle Street, Cambridge, Massachusetts 02138
- Region served: New England
- Website: ccae.org

The Cambridge Center for Adult Education (CCAE), a non-profit corporation in Cambridge, Massachusetts, has been teaching adult education courses at 42 Brattle Street since taking over the building from the Cambridge Social Union in 1938.

The CCAE is housed in two historic buildings, the William Brattle House (1727) at 42 Brattle Street and the Dexter Pratt House (1808) at 54 Brattle Street.

== History ==
The Cambridge Social Union (CSU), founded in 1871 and formally incorporated in 1876, taught classes for adults in the former Brattle house which it had moved into in 1889 after purchasing it. The courses included literacy classes and general classes taught by Harvard College and Radcliffe College students and faculty.

CSU withstood the financial troubles of the First World War and the Great Depression. However, a 1937 feasibility study showed that the organization was in trouble. In 1938, in conjunction with the Boston Center for Adult Education, the Cambridge Social Union became the Cambridge Center for Adult Education. It offered evening courses to local residents and in 1941 became an independently run organization.
