= Mary Fiske Stoughton House =

Historic house in Massachusetts, United States

- U.S. National Register of Historic Places
- U.S. National Historic Landmark
- U.S. Historic district – Contributing property
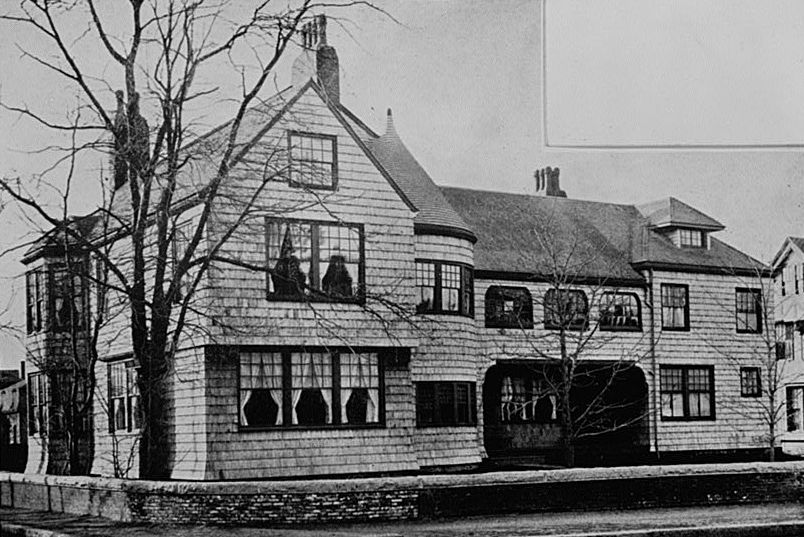
- Mary Fiske Stoughton House, from the northeast, prior to the 1900 alterations.

- Location within Massachusetts Location within the United States
- Location: 90 Brattle St. Cambridge, Massachusetts
- Coordinates: 42°22′33″N 71°7′30″W
- Area: about 1/4 acre
- Built: 1882-83 altered 1900, 1925, ca. 1970
- Architect: H. H. Richardson
- Architectural style: Shingle Style
- Part of: Old Cambridge Historic District (ID83000821)
- NRHP reference No.: 89001246

Significant dates
- Added to NRHP: June 29, 1989
- Designated NHL: June 29, 1989
- Designated CP: June 30, 1983

The Mary Fiske Stoughton House is a National Historic Landmark house at 90 Brattle Street in Cambridge, Massachusetts. Henry Hobson Richardson designed the house in 1882 in what is now called the Shingle Style, with a minimum of ornament and shingles stretching over the building's irregular volumes like a skin. The house drew immediate notice in the architectural community, and was a significant influence in the growth in popularity of the Shingle style in the late 19th century. Richardson's masterful use of space in its design also foreshadowed the work of major 20th century architects, including Frank Lloyd Wright. The house was designated a National Historic Landmark in 1989.

== Ownership history ==
In 1882 Mary Fiske Stoughton, the widow of Edwin W. Stoughton, commissioned the construction of a house in Cambridge, Massachusetts, to be nearer her son, John Fiske, a philosopher and historian who made his home there. Stoughton commissioned the house from the well-known architect Henry Hobson Richardson, and the building was completed in 1883. Fiske made major alterations in 1900: expanding the kitchen wing westward, and the whole rear of the house southward. A 1925 alteration created a new kitchen as a projecting bay to the front facade, and a 3rd story was added to the east facade's bay window. Sometime after 1969, the kitchen wing was altered again, with the 1900 and 1925 kitchens merged and converted into a garage.

== Description ==
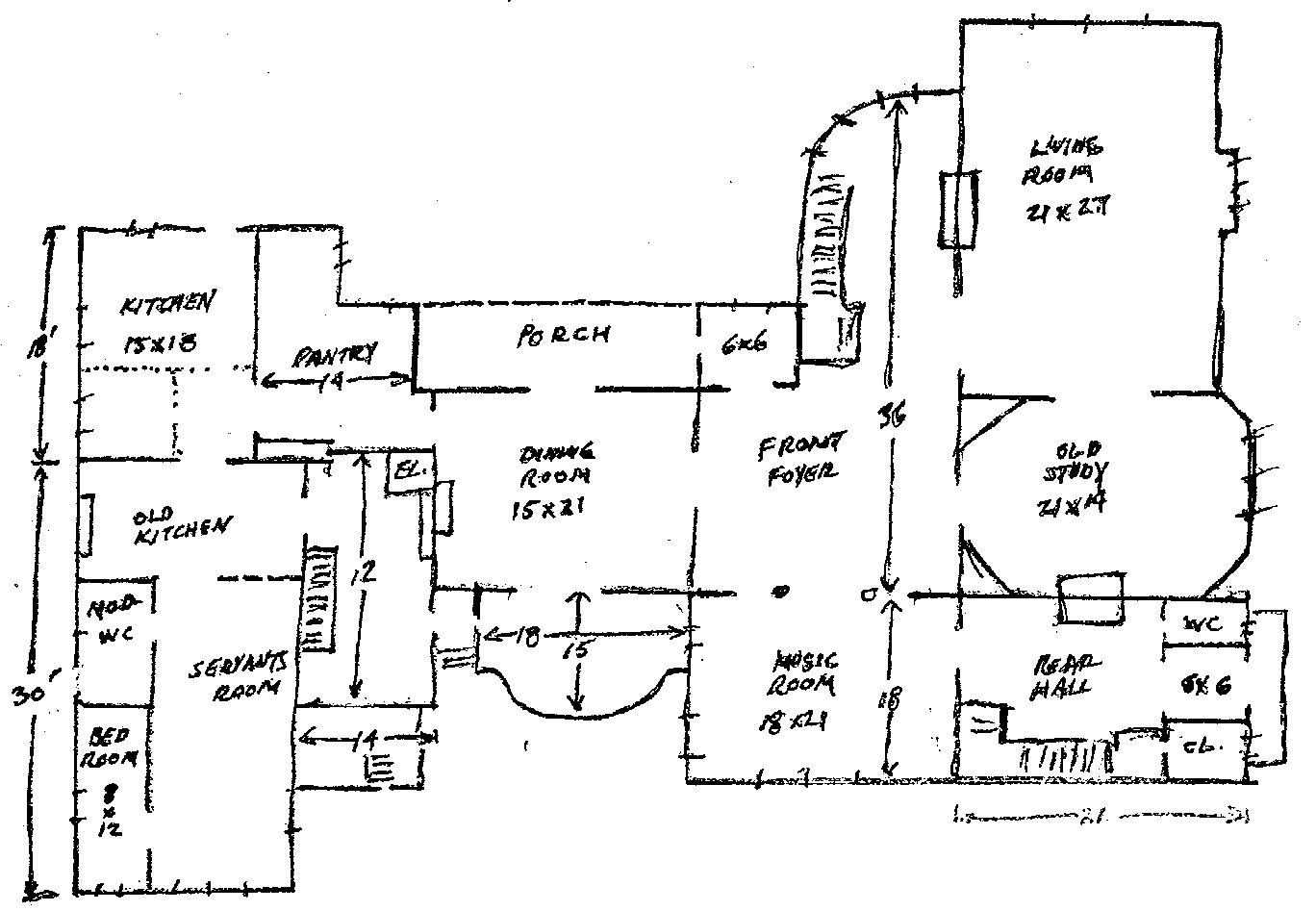
Plan showing the 1900 and 1925 additions. HABS 1967–69. North is to the top.

As designed by Richardson, the house was a two-story L-shaped wood-frame structure, with its main entrance to the left of a recessed porch facing Brattle Street. A side entrance is on the east side of the house, facing Ash Street. The exterior, in a departure from Victorian forms featuring sometimes extensive and elaborate decorative sawn woodwork, is restrained, with most surfaces covered with wooden shingles. The entry leads into a central hall at the crook of the L, which includes a sweeping semicircular staircase leading to the upper floors. From this hall access is gained to most of the public rooms on the ground floor, including a drawing room, music room, study, and dining room. The dining room is to the right of the entrance, with access to the formerly-recessed porch, which has been glassed in. Beyond the dining room to the right is the service wing, including the kitchen and laundry, later converted into a garage, and then again merged into the house proper. Behind the dining room, now filling in the crook of the L, is a conservatory.

The left side and center of the second floor are occupied by bedrooms and bathrooms, and the wing to the right is taken up by Fiske's large library. Servant bedrooms are in the attic space above. A third floor addition on the east side of the house has a small apartment with modern facilities.

The property was, according to older photographs, curbed by a low wall on its street-facing sides. This has been replaced with a higher brick wall, obscuring much of the view of the house. A brick-paved carport is located on the right side of the property, in front of the house.

== Influence ==
Soon after its completion, art critic George William Sheldon wrote, "few cottages of equal dimensions were ever planned, in this country or abroad, which show better results in point of convenience, spaciousness, and architectural purity." In 1982 century, architectural historian Henry-Russell Hitchcock wrote, "This is one of his [Richardson's] most successful works and is, perhaps, the best suburban wooden house in America. It is comparable only to the finest of Frank Lloyd Wright's."

Architectural historian Vincent Scully observed that Richardson's use of space in the house's design is a clear forerunner of the work of Wright, comparing adjacent houses in Buffalo, New York, one a virtual replica of this house, built in 1897, the other a Wright design built in 1905: "Both are classically coherent forms, but the Wright house obeys a more inexorable architectural discipline than does the Richardson House."

== Gallery ==
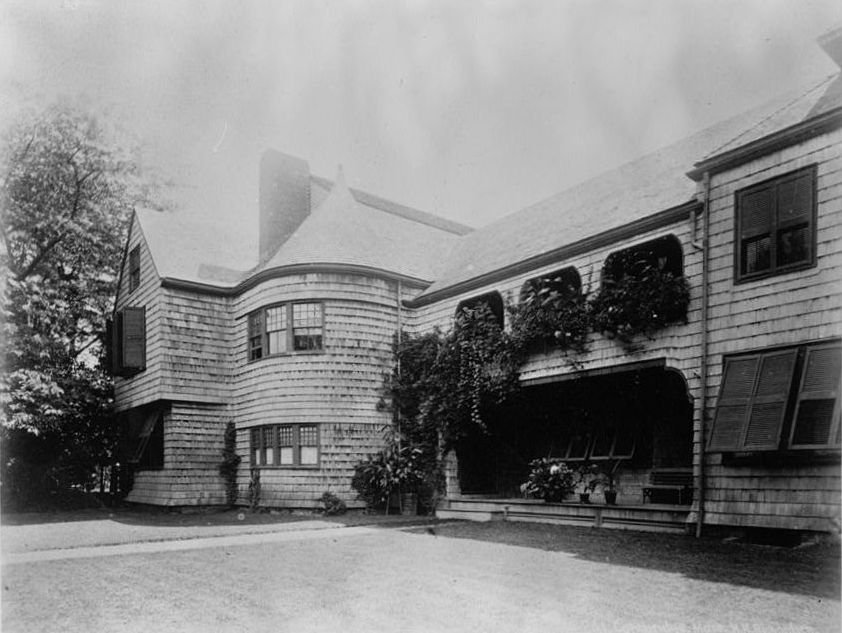
Stoughton House, between the 1900 and 1925 alterations.

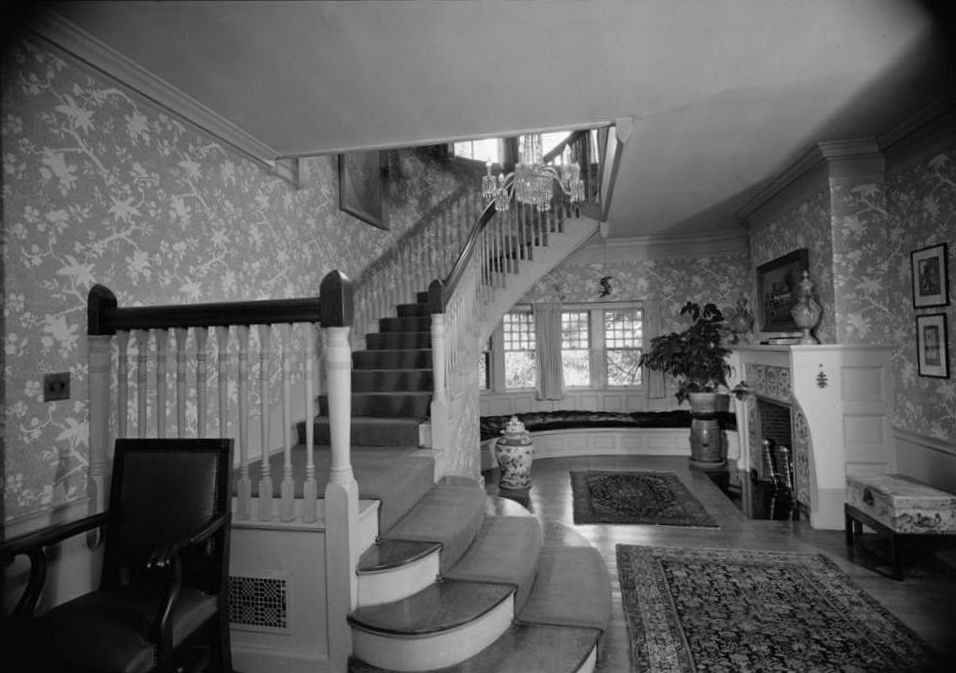
Hall and Stair (note the curved windowseat of the tower). Photo: HABS 1965.

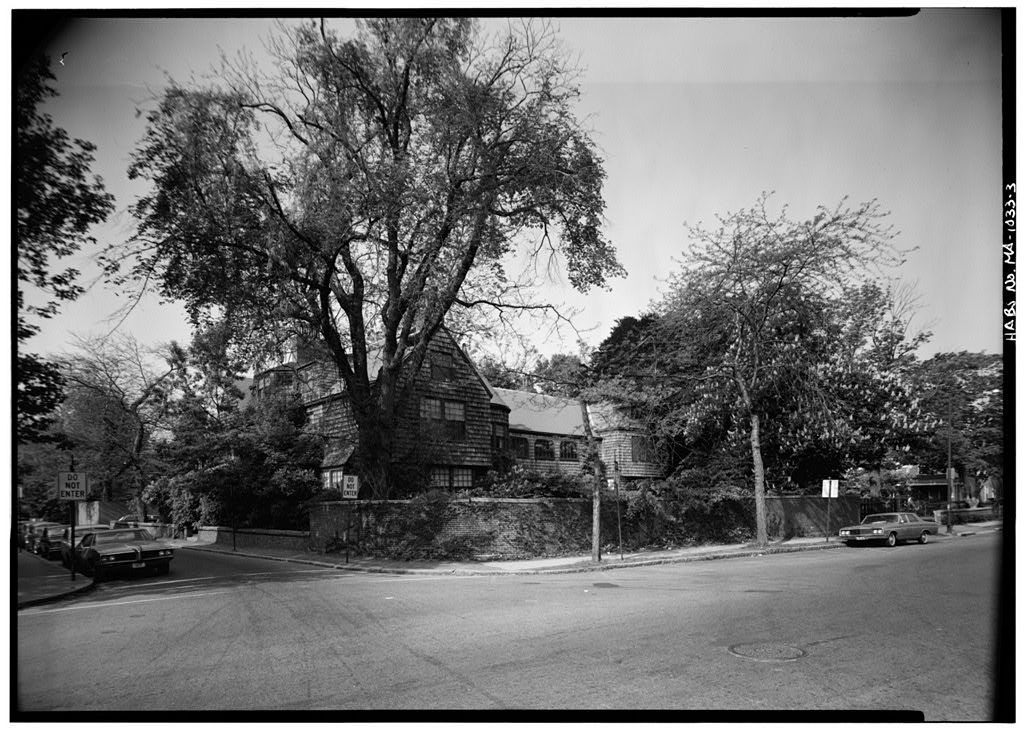
From Brattle Street. Photo: HABS 1965.

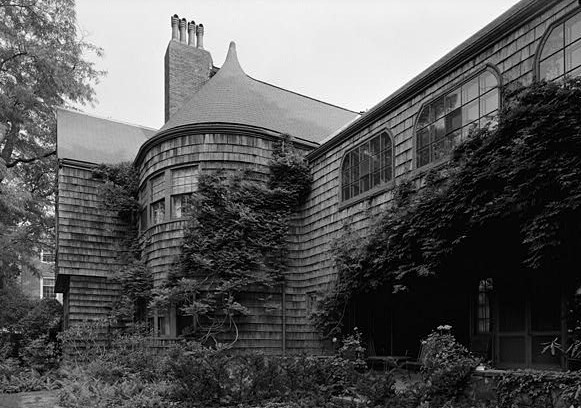
Stoughton House, 1967.

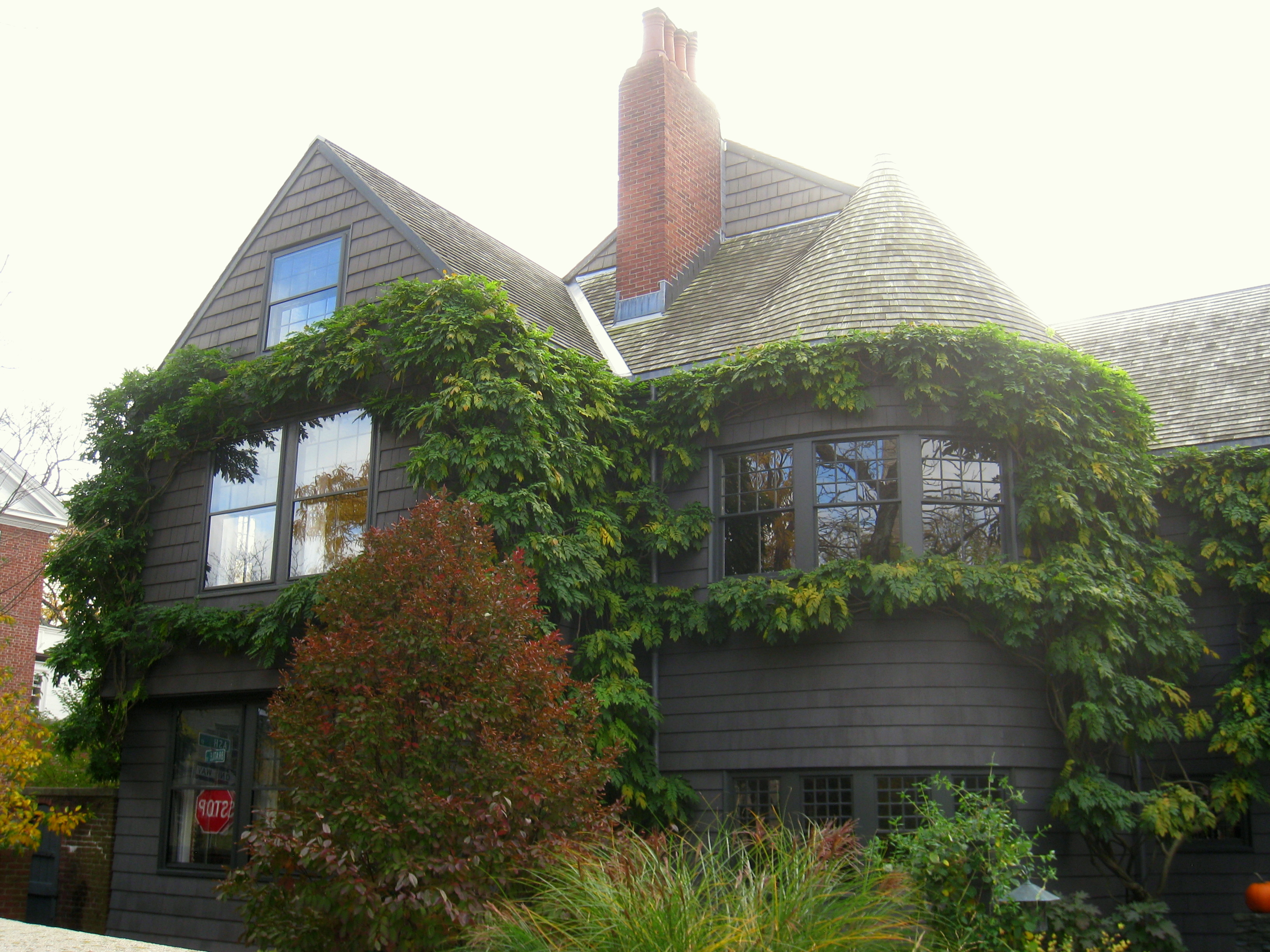
Stoughton House, 2009.

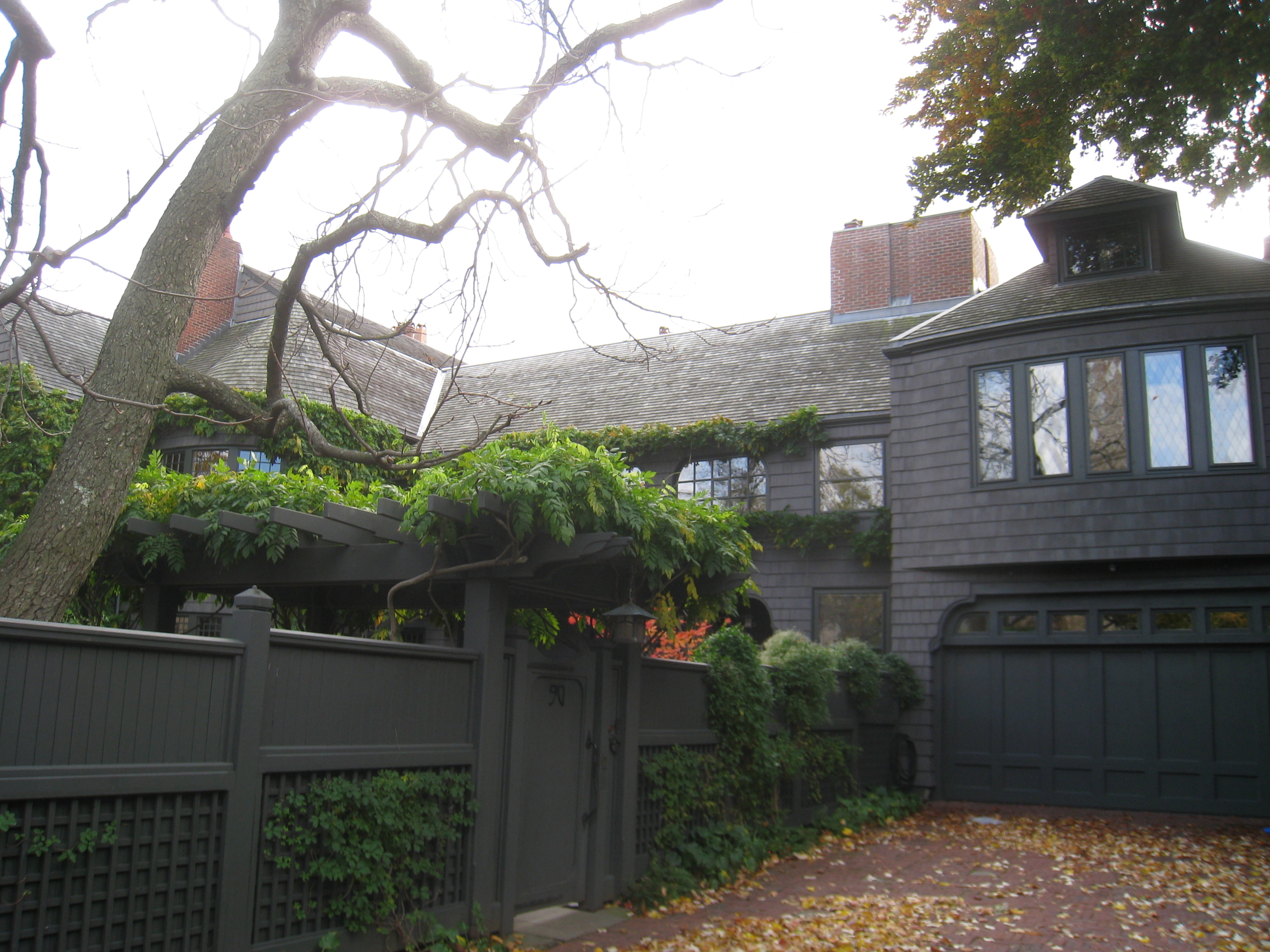
Stoughton House, 2009. The kitchen wing was converted into a garage sometime after 1969.

== See also ==
- List of National Historic Landmarks in Massachusetts
- National Register of Historic Places listings in Cambridge, Massachusetts
