= William Brattle House =

Historic house in Massachusetts, United States

- U.S. National Register of Historic Places
- U.S. Historic district – Contributing property
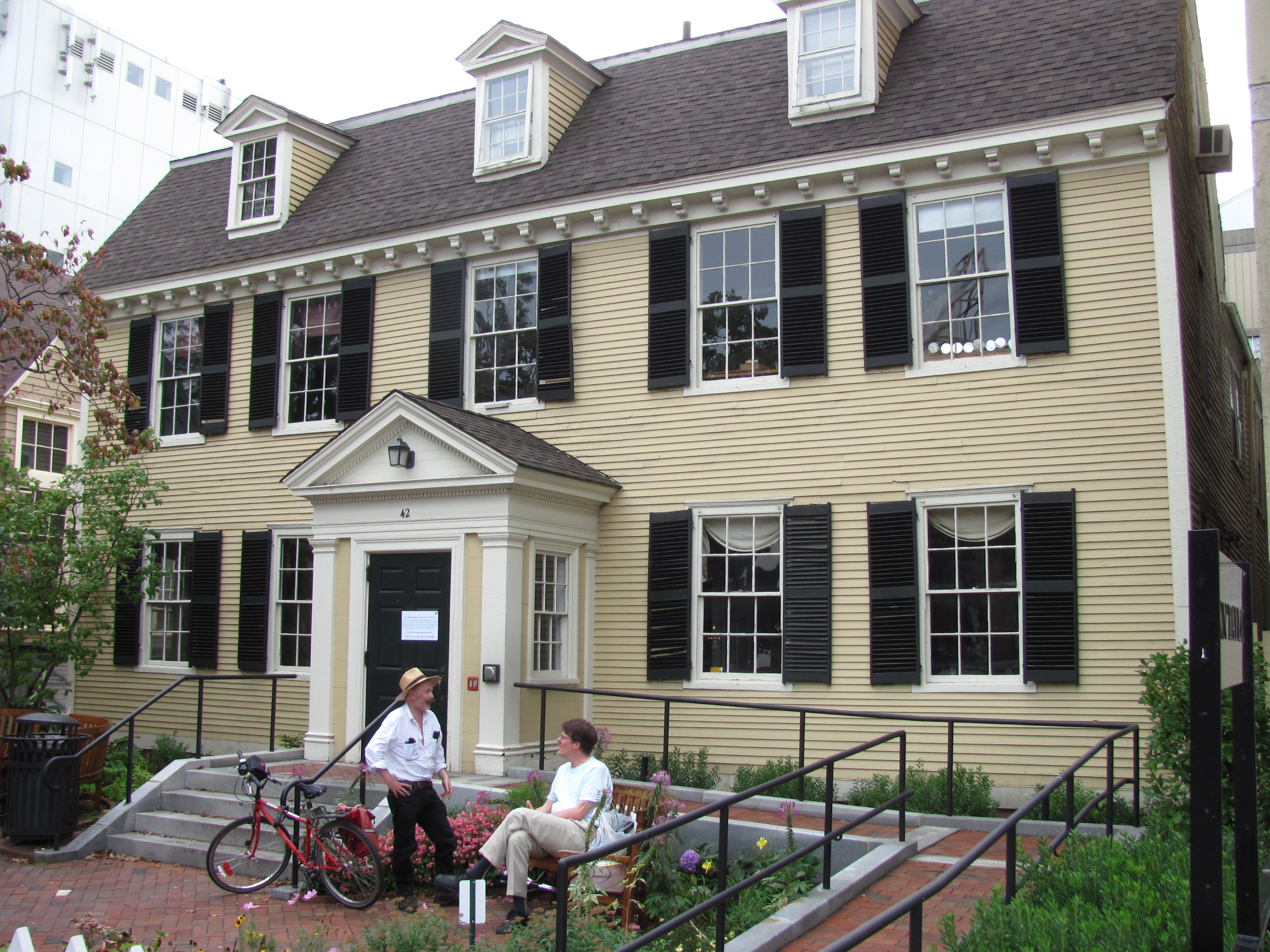
- The William Brattle House in 2011 as the Cambridge Center for Adult Education

- Location within Massachusetts Location within the United States
- Location: 42 Brattle Street, Cambridge, Massachusetts
- Coordinates: 42°22′25.3″N 71°7′17.6″W
- Built: 1727
- Architectural style: Georgian
- Part of: Harvard Square Historic District (ID86003654)
- NRHP reference No.: 73000286

Significant dates
- Added to NRHP: May 8, 1973
- Designated CP: July 28, 1988

The William Brattle House is an historic house in Cambridge, Massachusetts, United States. It is one of the seven Colonial mansions described by historian Samuel Atkins Eliot as making up Tory Row, housing several prominent figures in early colonial history. It remains in use by the Cambridge Center for Adult Education.

== History ==
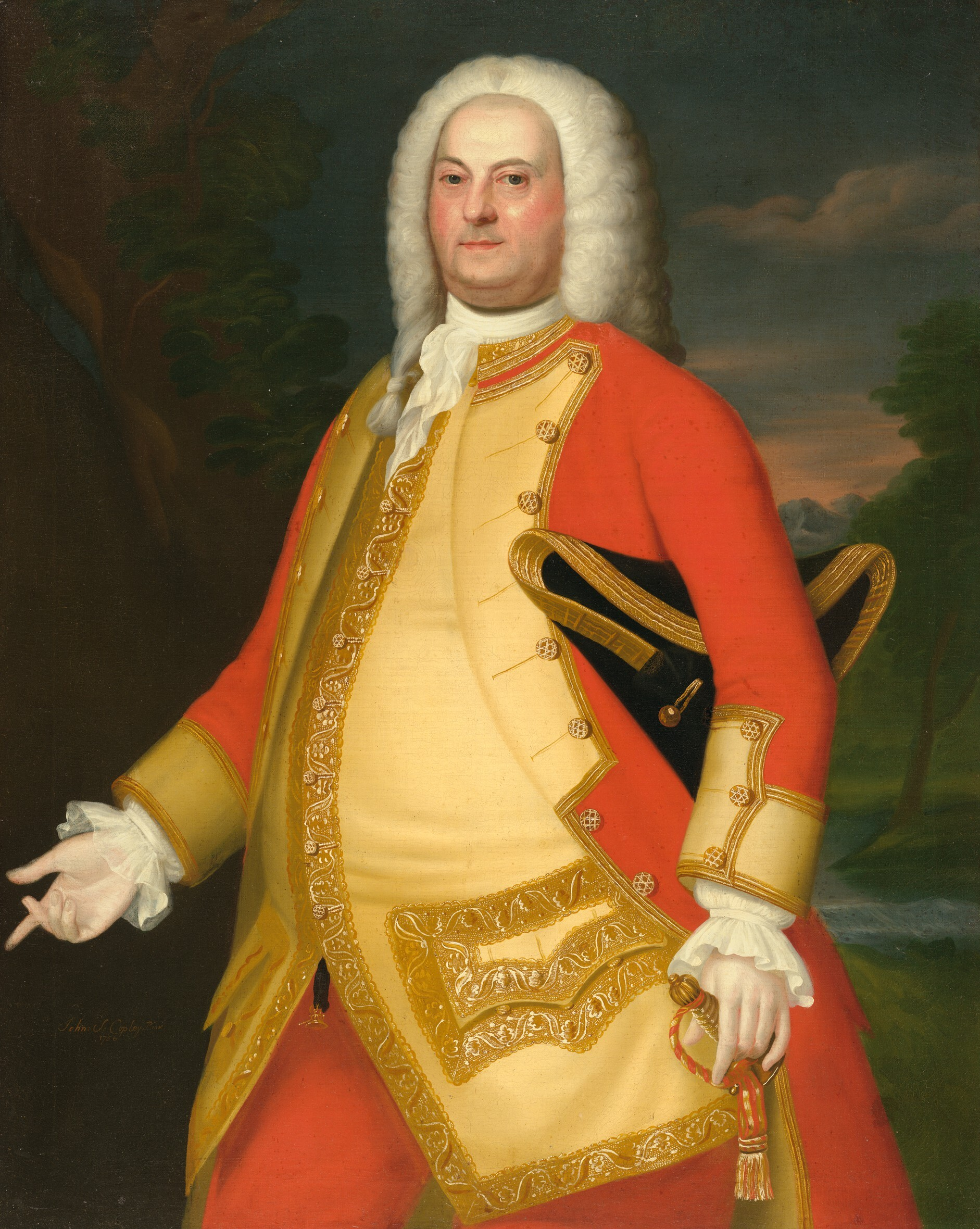
William Brattle, whom the houes was built for

The house was built in 1727 for William Brattle, one of wealthiest men in the Province of Massachusetts Bay, the son of William Brattle and nephew of Thomas Brattle. After the 1774 incident known as the Powder Alarm, an angry mob surrounded the mansion and forced Brattle to flee to Boston. At the age of 70, Brattle left Boston for Halifax, Nova Scotia on Evacuation Day, March 17, 1776, and died a few months later on October 26, 1776. He was buried in the Old Burying Ground (Halifax, Nova Scotia).

According to Edward Abbott, writing in 1859,

General Brattle conveyed all his real estate in Cambridge, December 13, 1774, to his only surviving son, Major Thomas Brattle... By the persevering efforts of Mrs. Katherine Wendell, the only surviving daughter of General Brattle, the estate was preserved from confiscation, and was recovered by Major Brattle after his return from Europe,—having been proscribed in 1778, and having subsequently exhibited satisfactory evidence of his friendship to his country and its political independence.

Nevertheless, the home was used temporarily as a headquarters by Thomas Mifflin and hosted a number of important figures from the early Revolutionary War period, including John Adams, who visited here before his trip to Philadelphia to sign the Declaration of Independence.

For a time, the William Brattle House was home to American journalist Margaret Fuller. Fuller's uncle Abraham owned the home at the time, and the Fuller family moved in shortly after Timothy Fuller's unsuccessful campaign for lieutenant governor of Massachusetts as an Anti-Mason. They arrived in September 1831 and left by April 1833. The young Fuller did not enjoy her time here and referred to the opulent home as her "gilded cage". While living here on Christmas Day 1834, she ran out of a church service and had the inspirational thought "that there was no self; that selfishness was folly" and that she must teach herself to "act in cooperation with the constraints of life".

The house was added to the National Register of Historic Places in 1973, and included in an expansion of the Harvard Square Historic District in 1988. It is currently owned and maintained by the Cambridge Center for Adult Education, a non-profit organization that was incorporated in 1938. CCAE also owns the historic Dexter Pratt House.

== Gallery ==
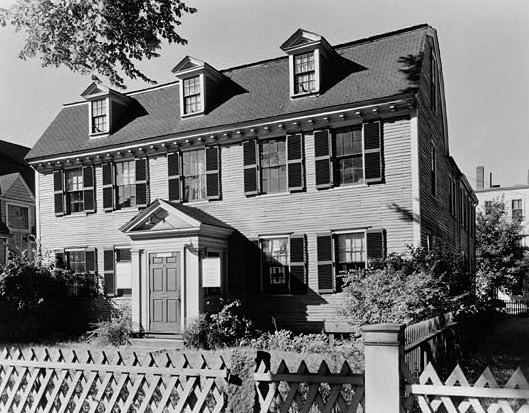
Brattle House in 1937

== See also ==
- National Register of Historic Places listings in Cambridge, Massachusetts
