= Darby Vassall =

Abolitionist

Darby Vassall (May 1769 – October 12, 1861) was an American abolitionist.

== Early life ==
Darby Vassall was born in May 1769, owned by John Vassall. At the time, Anthony and her wife, Cuba, had 6 children; Catherine, Cyrus, Darby, Dorrenda, Flora, and James. Their enslaver, Penelope, sold Cuba and some of Cuba's kids to John Vassall. Darby was then again sold by John to George Reed of Woburn. When he was 6, his enslaver died in the Battle of Bunker Hill, so he came back to his old house, which by then was abandoned. Allegedly, he encountered George Washington and offered to work for him. When Vassall asked what the wage would be, George reportedly said that "compensation would be unreasonable". Vassall then rejected the offer. Later in his life, he would allegedly say that he was "no gentleman, [wanting a] boy to work without wage".

== Activism ==
In 1796, Darby, his brother Cyrus, and 42 others founded Boston's African Society. Then, in 1812, he signed and became an ambassador for a petition to create a school for black students, which a decade later would become the Abiel Smith School. In 1844, Vassall came to the New England Anti-Slavery Convention in Boston, and voted to end the union, saying that the Constitution could let slaveholders “control the policy and character of this nation”. Then, in 1861, he signed a petition against the Fugitive Slave Act, an act that would have all slave escapees, if caught, get sent back to their owner. He was also the guest of honor at an event commemorating the Boston Massacre and the 2nd Vice President for an event commemorating Haitian Independence.

== Legacy ==
On October 12, 1861, Darby Vassal died at the age of 92. He was buried in Henry Vassal's tomb under Christ Church in Cambridge. An obituary was written about him in The Liberator by William Cooper Nell. Nell wrote that Vassal had "an intelligent appreciation of the Anti-Slavery movement" and "was favored with a wonderful memory".
