= Oliver Hastings House =

Historic house in Massachusetts, United States

- U.S. National Register of Historic Places
- U.S. National Historic Landmark
- U.S. Historic district – Contributing property
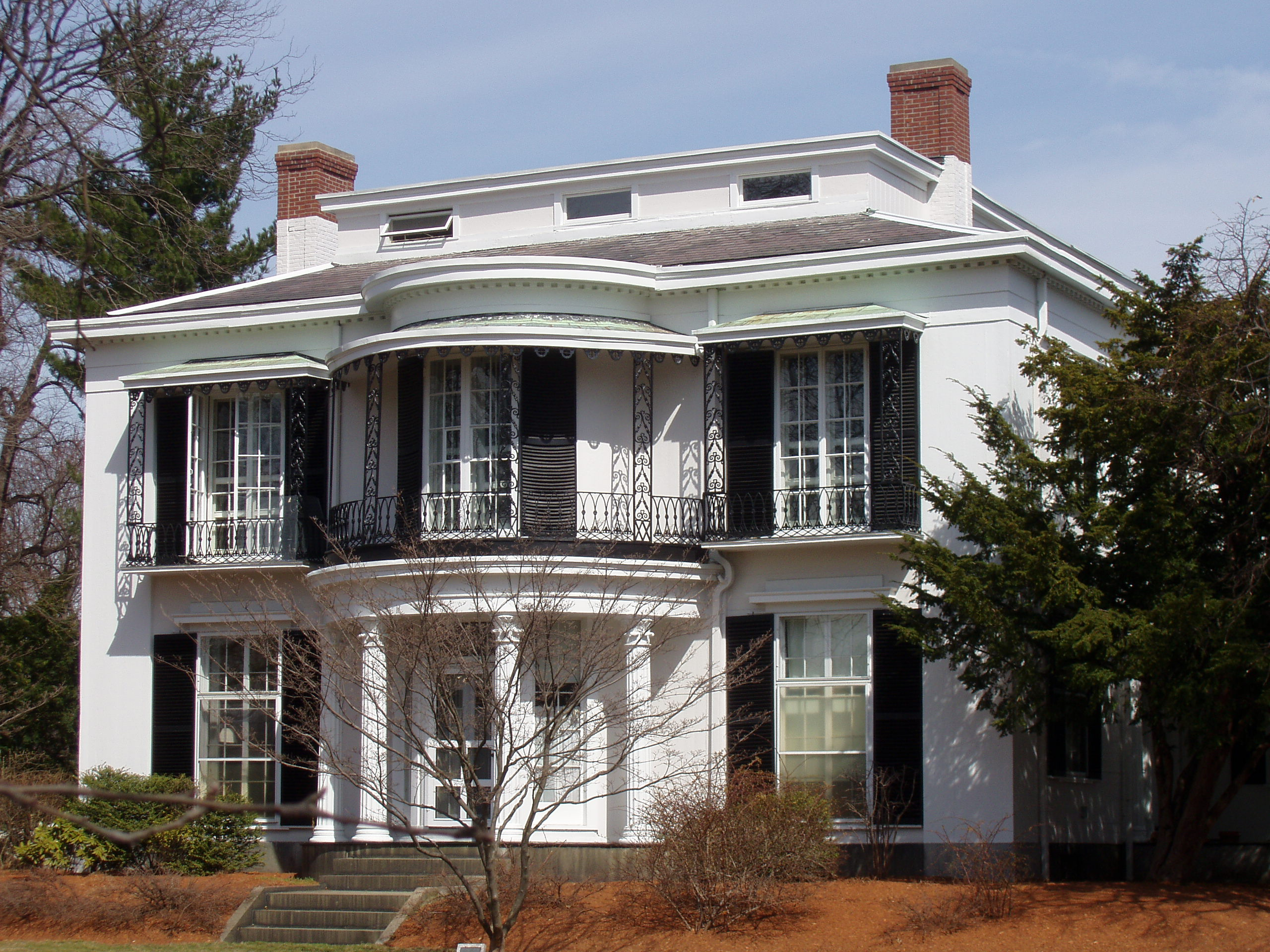

- Location within Massachusetts Location within the United States
- Location: 101 Brattle Street, Cambridge, Massachusetts
- Coordinates: 42°22′36″N 71°7′36″W
- Built: 1844
- Architectural style: Greek Revival
- Part of: Old Cambridge Historic District (ID83000821)
- NRHP reference No.: 70000681

Significant dates
- Added to NRHP: December 30, 1970
- Designated NHL: December 30, 1970
- Designated CP: June 30, 1983

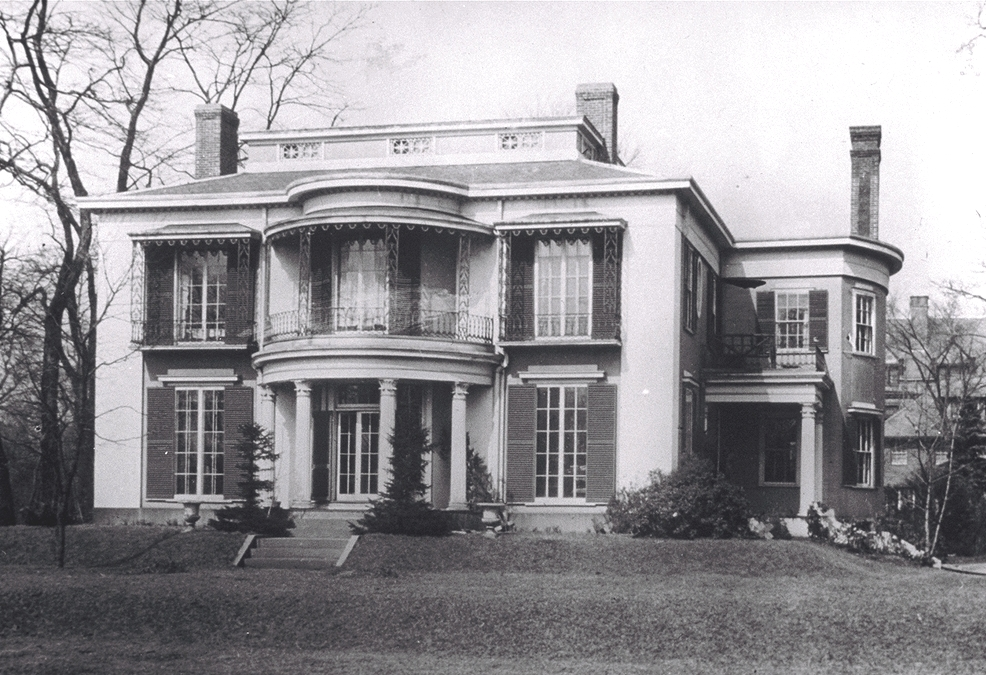
Oliver Hastings House, older photograph.

The Oliver Hastings House is a historic house in Cambridge, Massachusetts. It is a National Historic Landmark, noted as an excellent example of Greek Revival architecture. It was the home of Oliver Hastings, a local builder.

The house was constructed by Hastings in 1844 adjacent to the home of poet Henry Wadsworth Longfellow (now the Longfellow House–Washington's Headquarters National Historic Site). The house consists of two main dwelling stories topped by a hip roof that has a central monitor providing a partial third floor space. The building is in a T shape, with a rear section that extends one bay beyond the sides of the main front block. It has broad stripped pilasters at the corners, and a cornice with dentil molding. Its most prominent architectural feature is the rounded portico of the front facade, which is flanked by full-height windows on either side. Iron grillwork forms accent the second floor exterior, and the first floor of the portico has fluted Corinthian columns. Although the exterior of the house has been well preserved, the interior has been altered, particularly by its 20th century institutional owners.

It was later the home of William Lawrence, professor and Dean of the Episcopal Theological School and subsequently Bishop of Massachusetts. The house was purchased by the Theological School in 1950. It now forms part of the Brattle Street campus of Lesley University and Episcopal Divinity School, serving as the university's Office of Advancement and Alumni Relations.

The house was designated a National Historic Landmark and added to the National Register of Historic Places in 1970. It was further included in the Old Cambridge Historic District in 1983.

== See also ==
- List of National Historic Landmarks in Massachusetts
- National Register of Historic Places listings in Cambridge, Massachusetts
