= Samuel Batchelder =

American politician

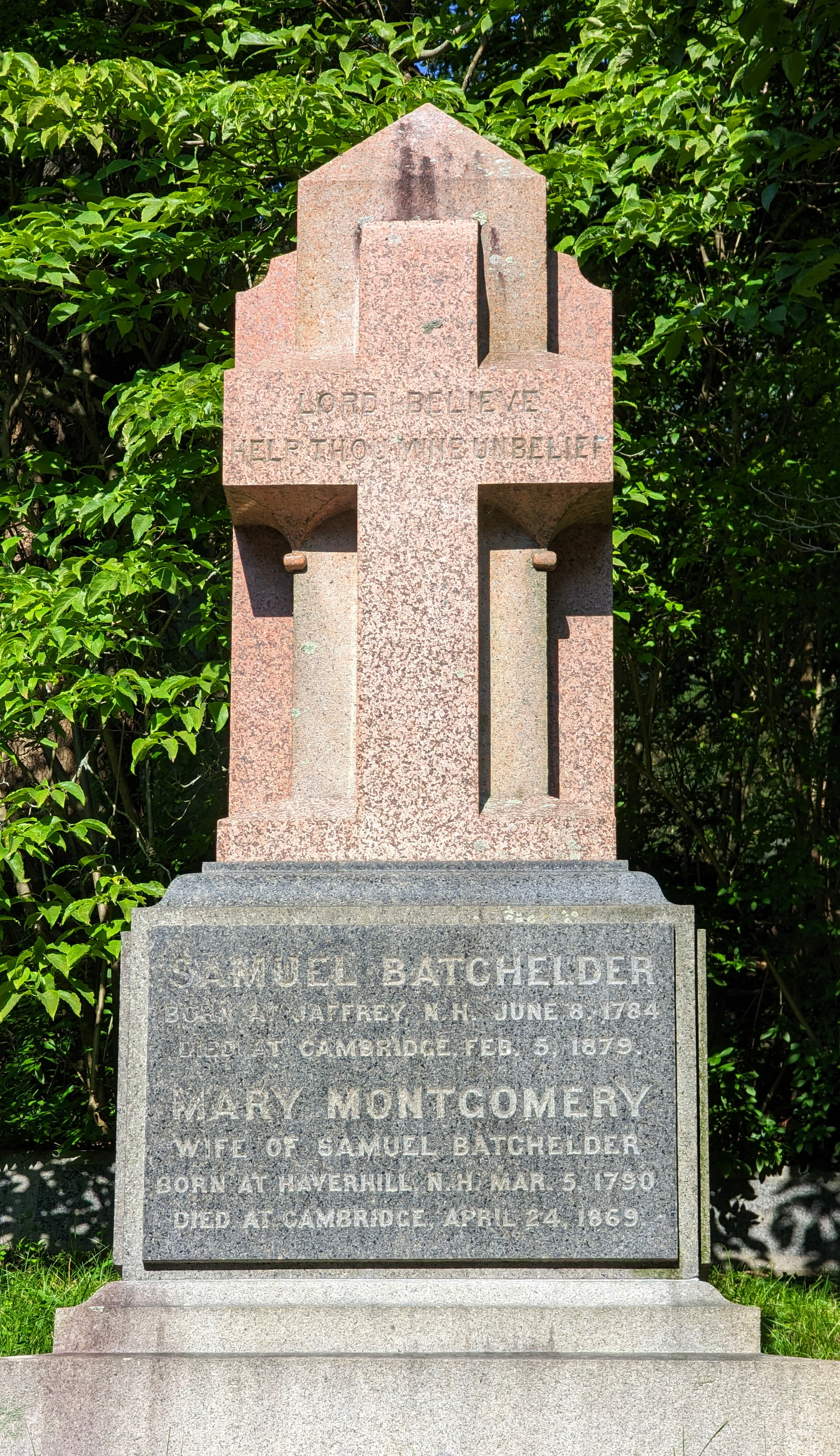
- Born: 8 June 1784; Jaffrey, New Hampshire
- Died: 5 February 1879 (aged 94); Cambridge, Massachusetts
- Writing career
- Genre: non-fiction

Samuel Batchelder (8 June 1784 in Jaffrey, New Hampshire – 5 February 1879 in Cambridge, Massachusetts) was an American inventor and writer.

== Biography ==
His family moved to New Ipswich when he was young, and by 1808 he was an investor in a cotton factory there, the second that was erected in New Hampshire. In 1825 he moved to Lowell, Massachusetts, where he superintended the erection of the Hamilton Company's mills. In 1831, he was called on to undertake the erection of a cotton mill for the York Manufacturing Company in Saco, Maine, and to superintend its operations. The mills under his management were very successful, and the plant and capital were greatly enlarged.

In 1846 he moved to Cambridge, Massachusetts, where he continued to reside, and, although a representative in the Massachusetts State Legislature, he yet for many years continued his relations with the mills, being president of the Hamilton Manufacturing Company, the Appleton Company, the Essex Company, the Everett Mills, the York Manufacturing Company, and the Exeter Manufacturing Company. The mills under his supervision had an aggregate capital of about $5,000,000.

== Inventions ==
About 1832, he devised the first stop motion to the drawing frame, which afterward was used both in the United States and England. In 1832 he patented the steam cylinders and connections which became universally used in dressing frames for drying yarns. His greatest invention was the dynamometer used for ascertaining the power for driving machinery. It was first used in the York Co. mills in 1837, and was considered preferable to any known apparatus for determining the power actually used in driving machinery.

== Writing ==
In early life he contributed to the Boston Monthly Anthology and to the Port Folio. He wrote:

- Responsibilities of the North in Relation to Slavery (Cambridge, 1856)
- Introduction and Early Progress of the Cotton Manufacture in the United States (Boston, 1863)
