= Cooper–Frost–Austin House =

Historic house in Massachusetts, United States

Coordinates: 42.38449°N 71.12184°W

- U.S. National Register of Historic Places
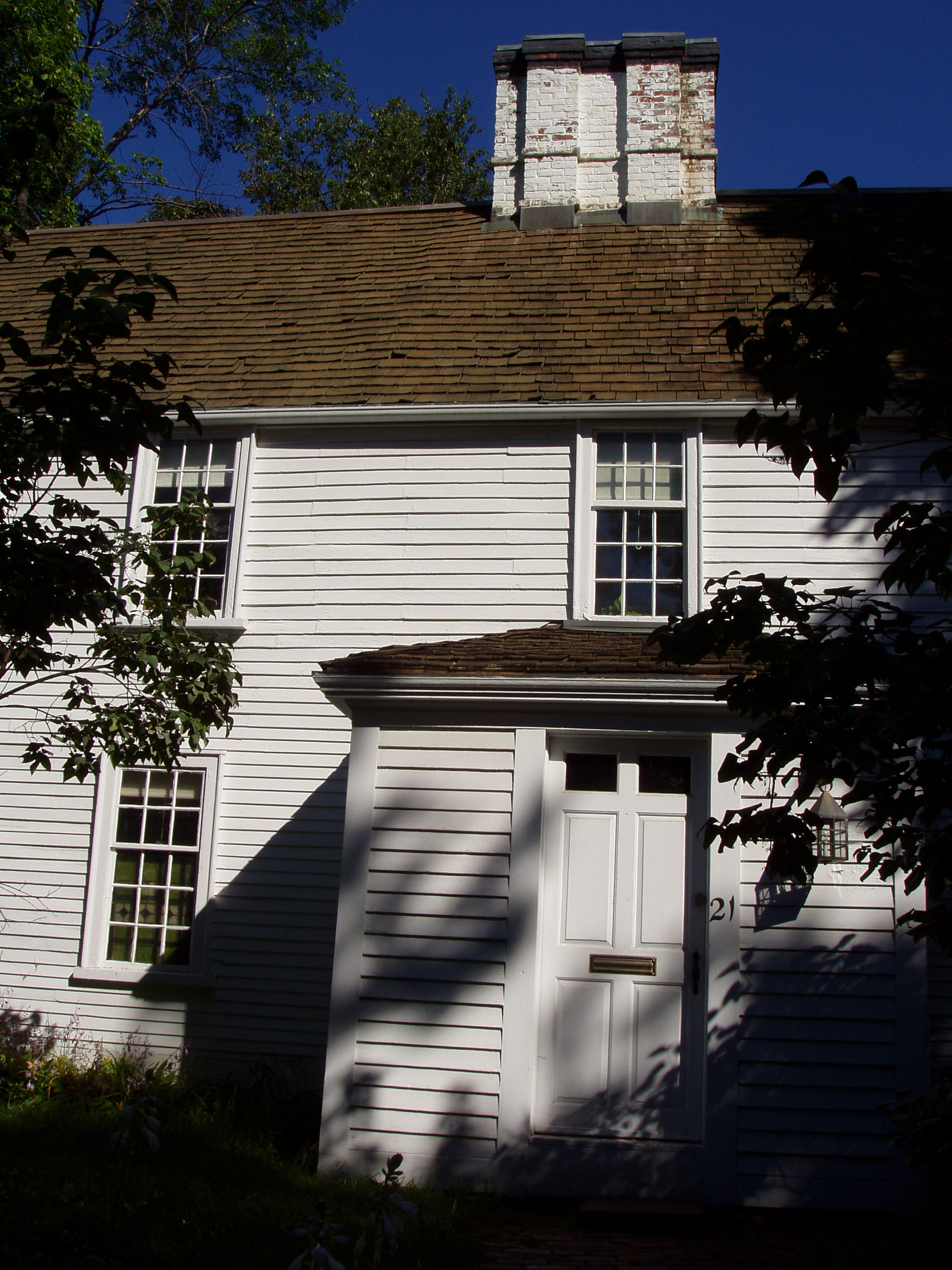
- Part of front facade with enclosed porch
- Location: 21 Linnaean St; Cambridge, Massachusetts
- Built: 1681
- NRHP reference No.: 72000124
- Added to NRHP: September 22, 1972

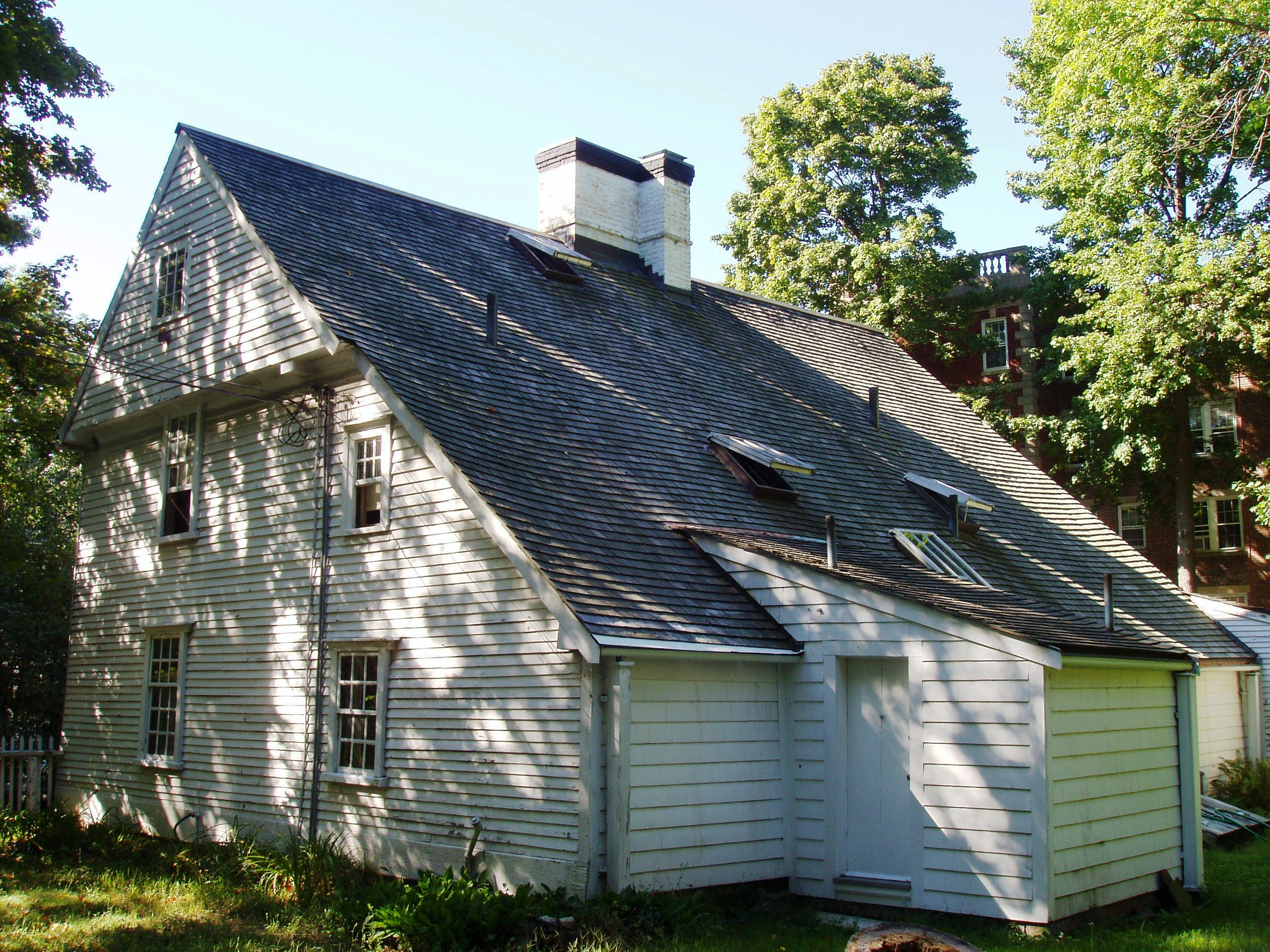
View from rear corner, showing lean-to section.

The Cooper–Frost–Austin House is a historic Colonial American house, built in 1681. It is located at 21 Linnaean Street, Cambridge, Massachusetts. It is the oldest extant home in Cambridge and is owned and operated as a non-profit museum by Historic New England. The house is rarely open for public tours, but private tours can be arranged during the summer months.

The house was built by Samuel Cooper on land that his father, Deacon John Cooper, had owned since 1657, and was first documented in 1689 in The Register Book of the Lands and Houses in the "New Towne" (as Cambridge was then named). Its original structure was a single room and chimney bay in width, two and one half stories in height with an integral lean-to, containing a "low room," "little room," "kitchin," "Chamber," "kitchin Chamber," "Garret," and "Cellar," all of which still exist, as do the original chimney and a facade gable. The house was extended ca. 1720 by Cooper's son, and then again between 1807 and 1816 by Martha Frost Austin and Thomas Austin who added an enclosed porch and Federal style stairway and trim. The house was acquired by Historic New England in 1912.

In 2002 the Oxford Dendrochronology Laboratory analyzed wooden beams from the original structure and ascertained that donor trees were felled at the following times: winter 1675–1676, winter 1680–1681, and spring 1681. The oldest timber may have been stockpiled before construction.

== See also ==
- National Register of Historic Places listings in Cambridge, Massachusetts
