= Hooper–Lee–Nichols House =

Historic house in Massachusetts, United States

- U.S. National Register of Historic Places
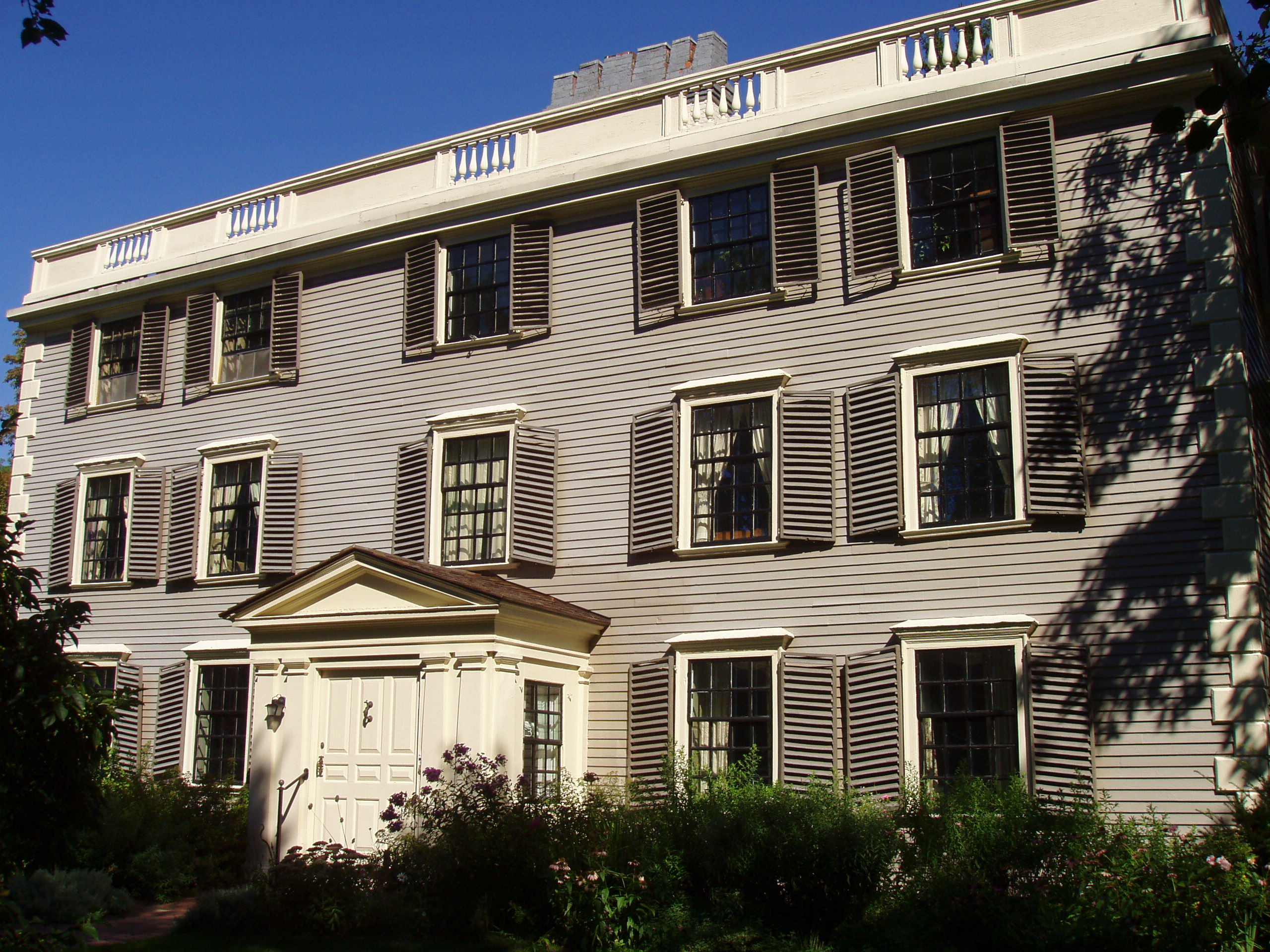
- The Hooper–Lee–Nichols House, front facade

- Location within Massachusetts Location within the United States
- Location: Cambridge, Massachusetts
- Coordinates: 42°22′39.3″N 71°8′3.2″W
- Built: 1685
- Architect: Joseph E. Chandler
- NRHP reference No.: 79000355
- Added to NRHP: June 15, 1979

The Hooper–Lee–Nichols House is an historic Colonial American house in Cambridge, Massachusetts. Initially constructed in 1685 and enlarged and remodeled many times thereafter, it is located at 159 Brattle Street in Cambridge. It is the second-oldest house in the city (after the Cooper–Frost–Austin House, c. 1681–1682). The house is now headquarters for History Cambridge, formerly the Cambridge Historical Society.

== History ==
The house was originally built in 1685 by Dr. Richard Hooper as a typical First Period farmhouse, although its ceilings were plastered, which was unusual for a modest house. When Hooper died in 1691, his wife took in boarders and the property then began to fall into disrepair. She in turn died in 1701, and the house continued its decline until 1716, when it was claimed by Hooper's son, Dr. Henry Hooper, who discharged the debts on his mother's estate. He purchased a second house, had it disassembled, moved to the site and reassembled, thereby doubling the size of the house. He also added a lean-to and rebuilt the chimney with cooking ovens. In 1733, he sold the house to Cornelius Waldo, who added a third story and began the process of converting the house to Georgian style.

Judge Joseph Lee bought the house in 1758, adding the enclosed entry porch and applying stucco to the west wall. Lee was a Loyalist and hence vacated his house during the first days of the American Revolution; he returned, however, in 1777.

In 1850, George and Susan Nichols rented the house and began to renovate it. They enlarged the rear and installed the roof balustrade, containing balusters once part of the chancel of Saint Paul's Cathedral in Boston. In 1916 Austin White, a relative of the Nicholses, removed the two-story rear of the house and rebuilt it to a full three stories. Finally in 1923 Frances Emerson was given the house by her father as a Christmas present. Her husband was for many years Dean of Architecture at MIT.

== Modern use ==
Frances Emerson deeded the house to the Cambridge Historical Society, which came into possession of it in 1957. The house was listed on the National Register of Historic Places in 1979. In the early 1980s, the Society made extensive restorations and stabilization of the structure. Additional major renovation work was performed in 2013.

Cambridge Historical Society was renamed History Cambridge in 2021. In 2025, the organization announced it was seeking a new headquarters and would be selling the historic house, citing high maintenance costs.

== See also ==
- National Register of Historic Places listings in Cambridge, Massachusetts
