= Middlesex County Courthouse =

Middlesex County Courthouse may refer to:

- Middlesex County Courthouse (Massachusetts), Cambridge, Massachusetts
- Eastern Middlesex County Second District Court, Waltham, Massachusetts, listed on the National Register of Historic Places (NRHP)
- Middlesex County Courthouse (Saluda, Virginia), NRHP-listed
- Middlesex County Courthouse (Urbanna, Virginia), NRHP-listed
- Middlesex County Court House (London, Ontario), Canada
