= Charles R. Greco =

American architect

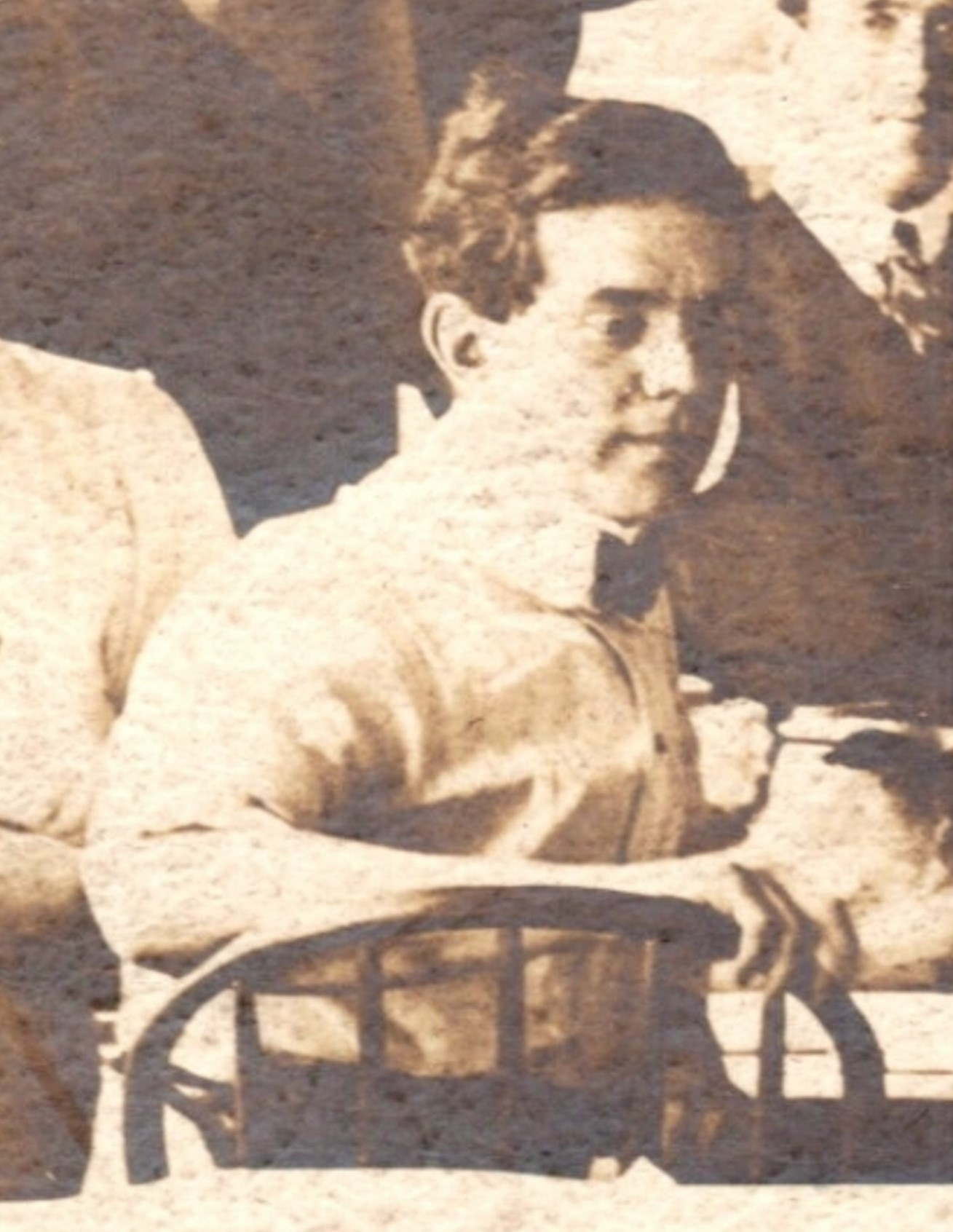
- Born: Charles Reggio Greco; October 15, 1873
- Died: February 22, 1963 (aged 89); Trumbull, Connecticut
- Education: Lawrence Scientific School at Harvard University
- Occupation: Architect
- Buildings: Radding Building; Taylor Square Firehouse; Hyde Park High School; Maynard High School; Hebrew Infant Asylum; Temple Tifereth-Israel; Temple Emanuel; Congregation Beth Israel

Charles R. Greco (October 15, 1873 – February 22, 1963) was an American architect who worked in the Boston area during the first half of the 20th century. He was educated in the Cambridge public school system and studied architecture at the Lawrence Scientific School of Harvard. Upon graduation he worked with the architectural firms of Wait & Cutter from 1893 to 1899, and Peabody & Stearns from 1900 to 1907, before starting his own practice.

Greco designed numerous religious buildings for both Roman Catholic and Jewish congregations in Massachusetts, Florida, and Ohio. He also provided the designs for many buildings for the city of Cambridge, Massachusetts, including several fire stations. His work includes several public and religious schools.

Greco was a member of the Boston Society of Architects, American Institute of Architects, and the Knights of Columbus. Greco died February 22, 1963, in Trumbull, Connecticut.

== Works ==
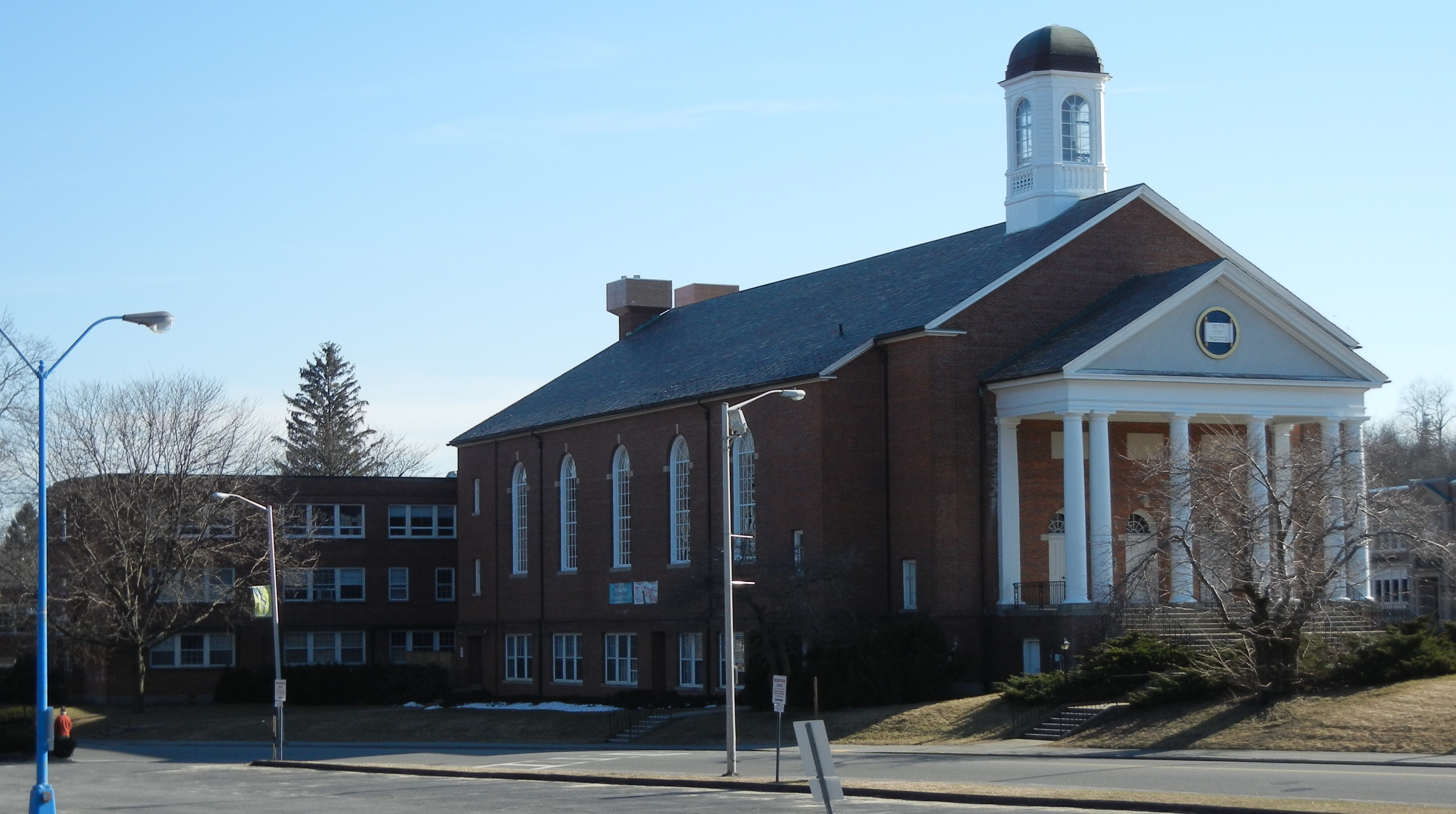
Temple Emanuel (Worcester)

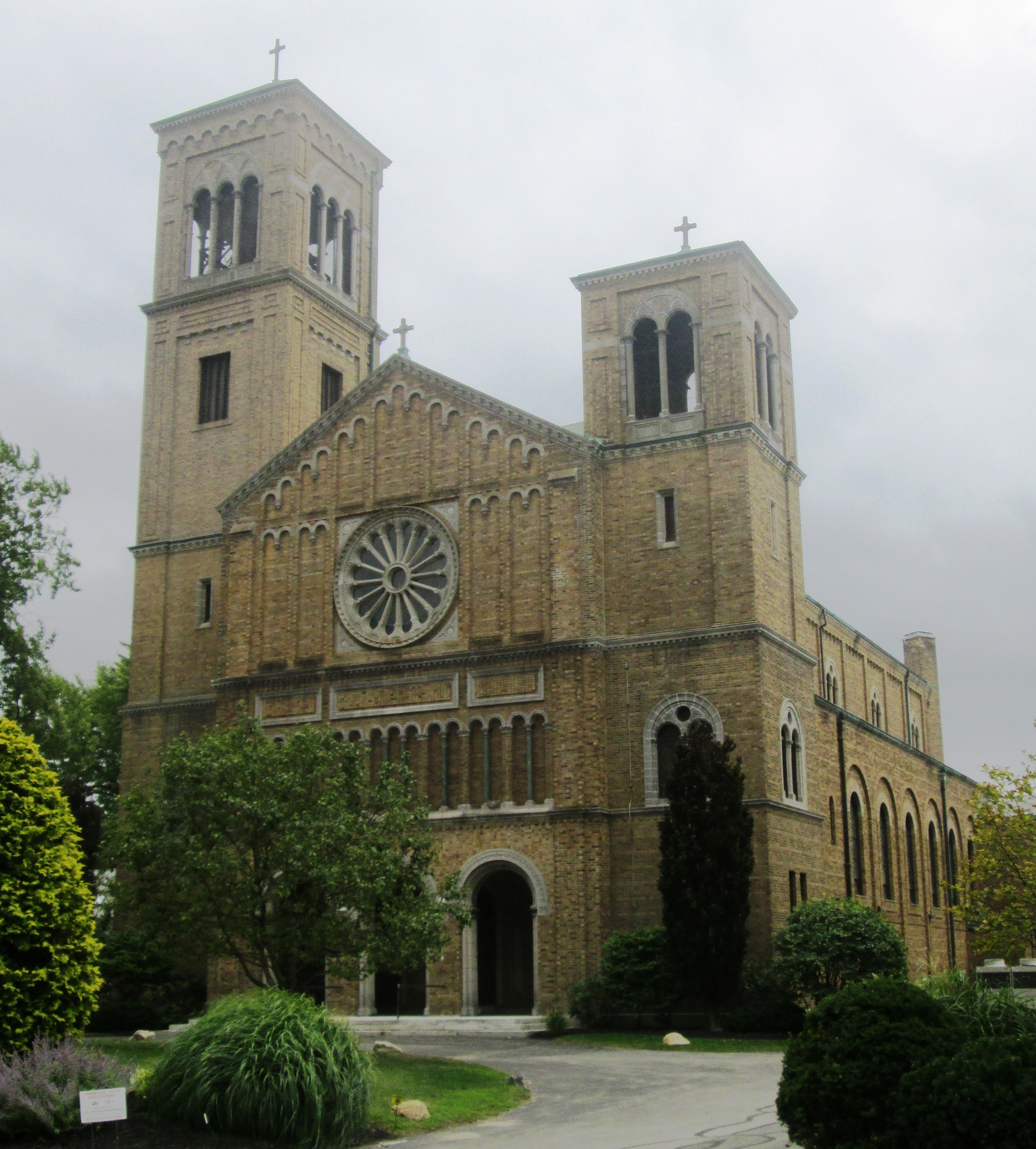
Our Lady of Pity (Cambridge)

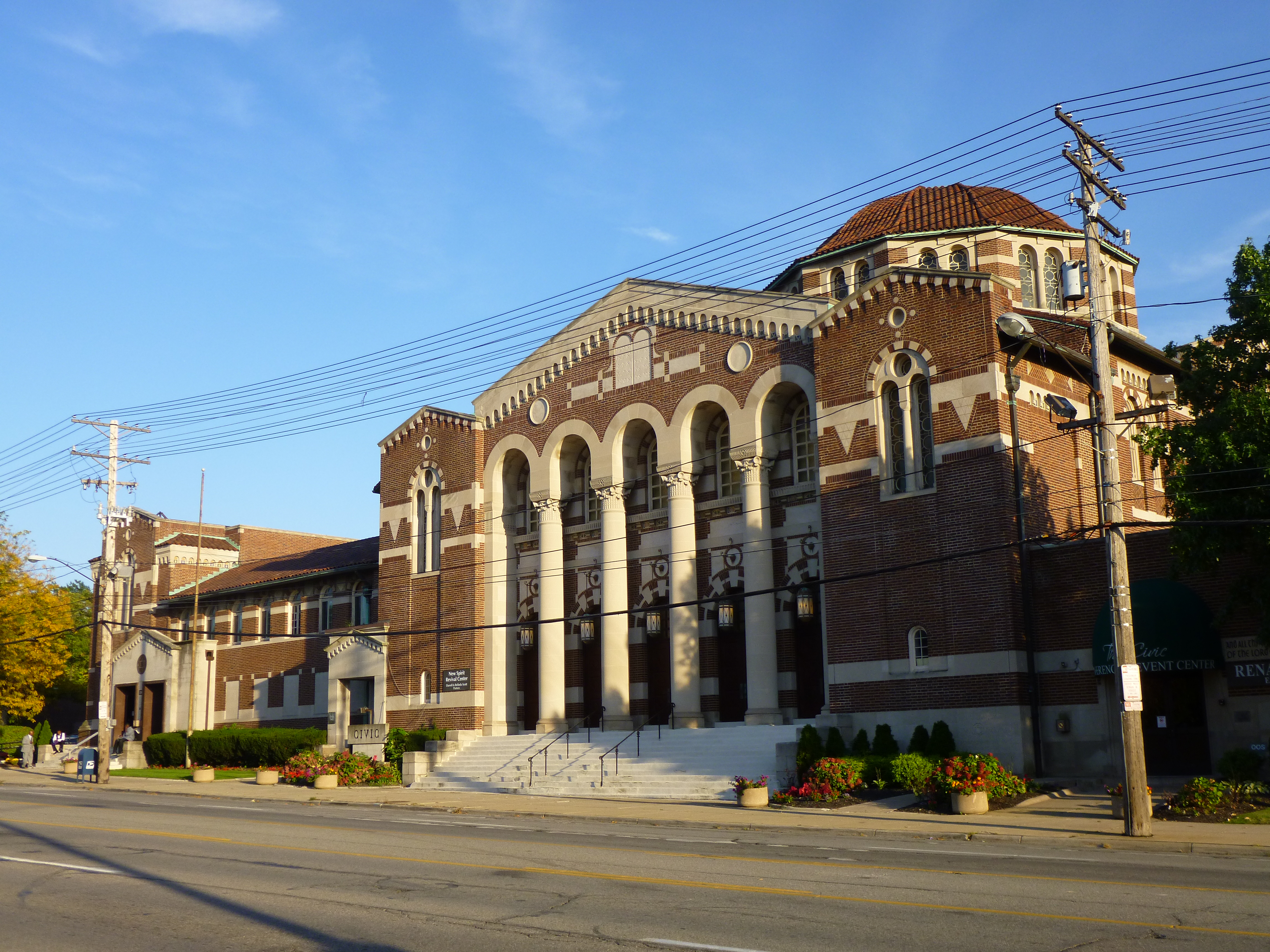
Temple on the Heights (Cleveland)

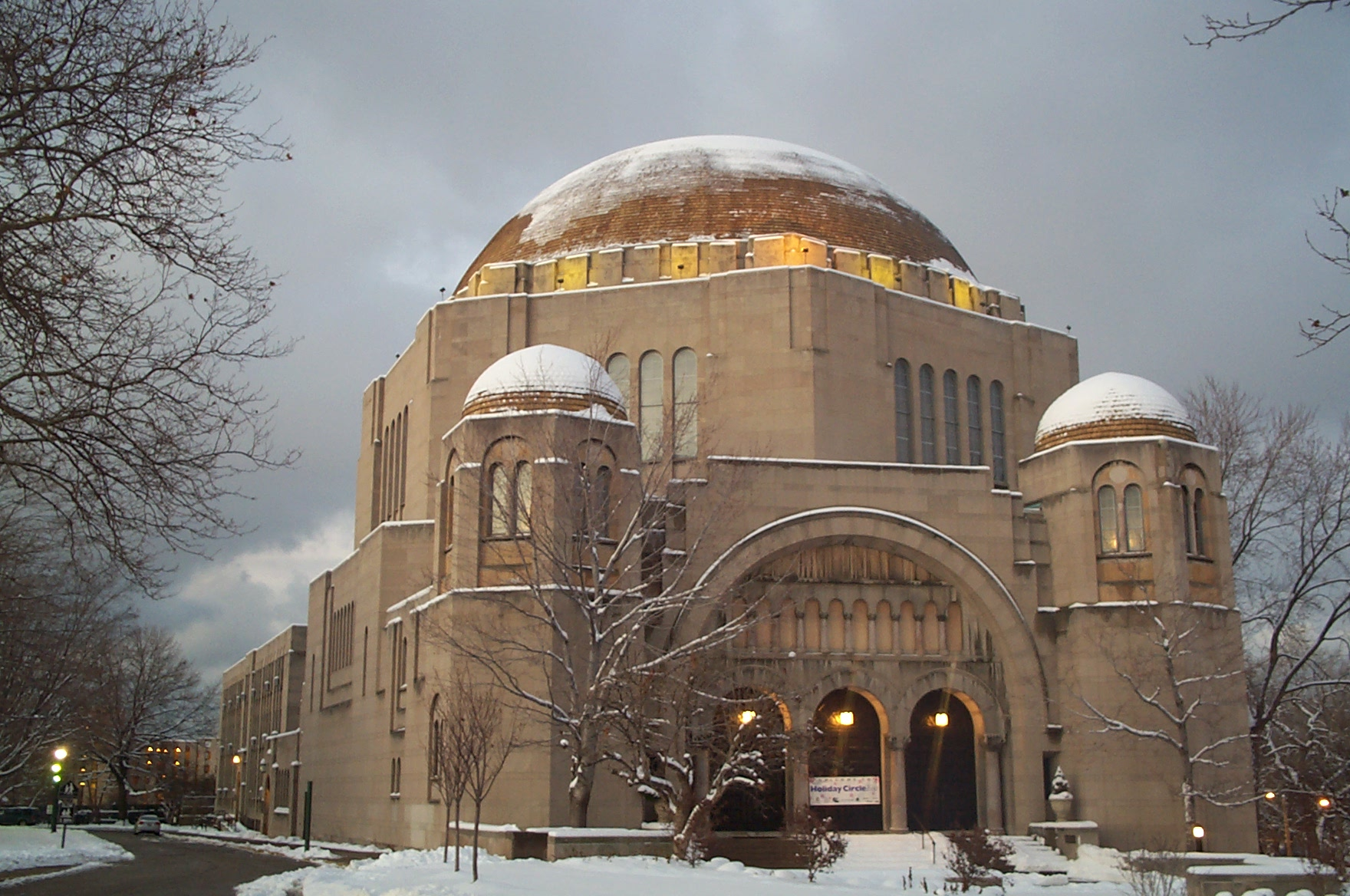
Temple Tifereth Israel (Cleveland)

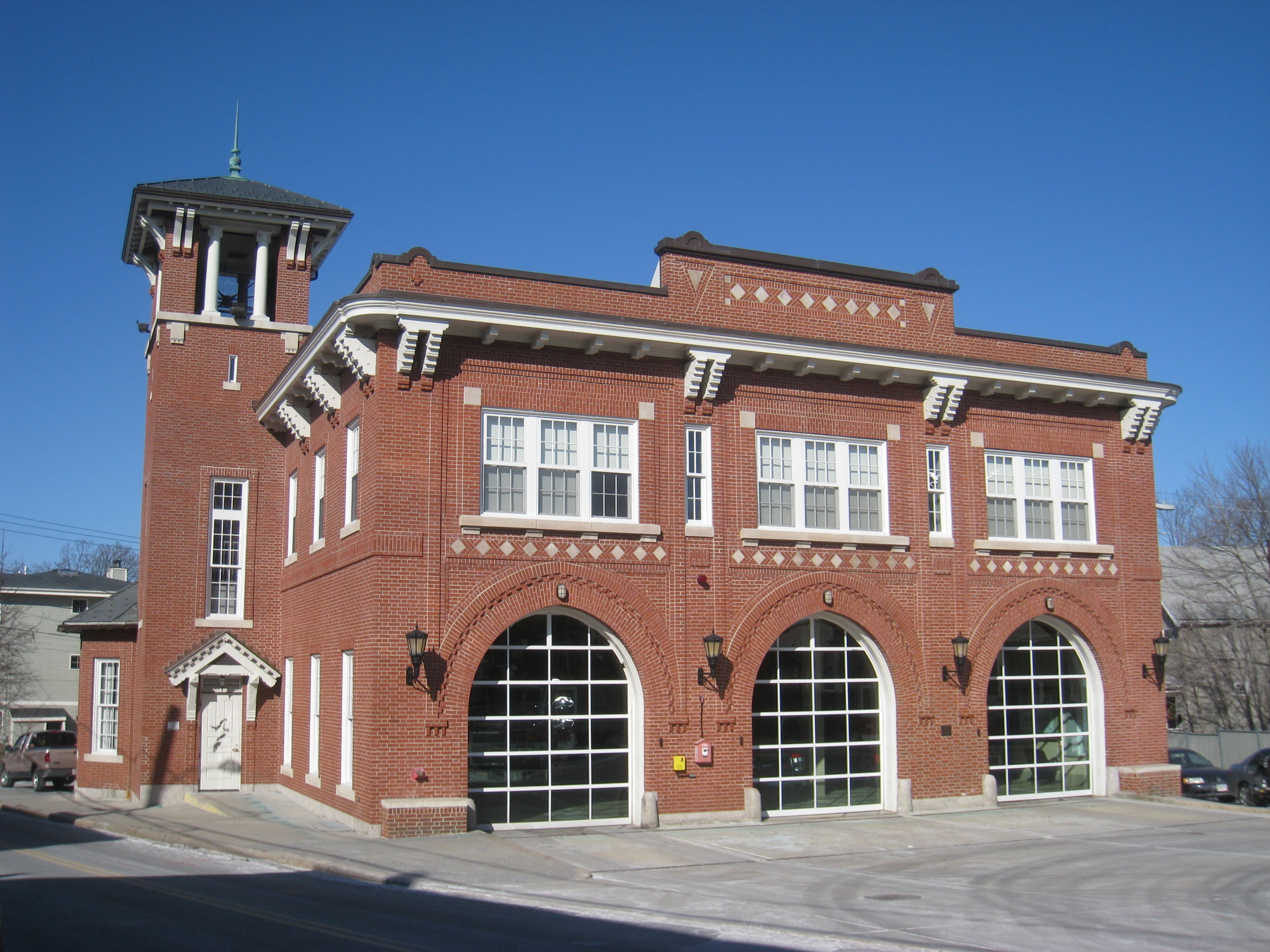
Taylor Square Firehouse, 113 Garden Street, Cambridge, MA

In Massachusetts

- 27 Sheffield West, Winchester, Massachusetts
- Blessed Sacrament Church Cambridge, Massachusetts
- Blessed Sacrament Church, Jamaica Plain, Massachusetts
- Cambridge Theatre, Cambridge, Massachusetts
- Central Fire Station Malden, Massachusetts
- Central Square Post Office, Cambridge, Massachusetts
- Charles Bulfinch School, Boston, Massachusetts
- Eastern Middlesex County Second District Court, Waltham, Massachusetts
- Elks Temple, Cambridge, Massachusetts
- Hyde Park High School, Hyde Park, Massachusetts
- Lyman Terrace Housing Project, Holyoke, Massachusetts
- Malden District Court, Malden, Massachusetts
- Maynard High School, Maynard, Massachusetts
- Our Lady of Pity Church (French Church of Notre Dame de Pitie), Cambridge, Massachusetts (now Reservoir Church)
- Radding Building, 145 State Street, Springfield, Massachusetts
- Radnor and Hampstead Halls, Cambridge, Massachusetts
- Sacred Heart Church, Middleborough, Massachusetts
- St. Augustine's School, Andover, Massachusetts
- St. Gregory's School, Milton, Massachusetts
- St. Jerome's Church, Weymouth, Massachusetts
- St. Joseph's Convent at Roxbury, Roxbury, Massachusetts
- St. Mary's Church, Quincy, Massachusetts
- St. Matthew's Church and Rectory, Dorchester, Massachusetts
- St. Patrick's Church, Brockton, Massachusetts
- St. Patrick's Church, Rectory, and Convent, Brockton, Massachusetts
- Taylor Square Firehouse, North Cambridge, Massachusetts
- Temple Emanuel, Worcester, Massachusetts
- Thorndike School, Cambridge, Massachusetts
- Wyeth Square Fire Station, Cambridge, Massachusetts

Ohio

- Harvey S. Firestone Jr. Estate, Twin Oaks Drive, Akron, Ohio (with Edward Reed)
- Hebrew Infant Asylum, East Cleveland, Ohio
- School at Church of Collinwood District, Cleveland, Ohio
- St. Mary's School and Hall, Painesville, Ohio
- Temple on the Heights, Cleveland Heights, Ohio
- Temple Tifereth-Israel, Cleveland, Ohio (now Maltz Performing Arts Center)

Elsewhere

- Congregation Beth Israel, 701 Farmington Ave, West Hartford, Connecticut
- St. John the Baptist Church, Brunswick, Maine
- Temple Emanuel Miami Beach, Florida (with Albert Anis)
