= Charles Greco =

Charles Greco may refer to:

- Charles Pasquale Greco (1894–1987), American prelate of the Roman Catholic Church
- Charles R. Greco (1873–1963), American architect
