= Temple Beth Israel (Hartford, Connecticut) =

Historic former Reform synagogue, now cultural center, in Hartford, Connecticut, US

Temple Beth Israel (1876)
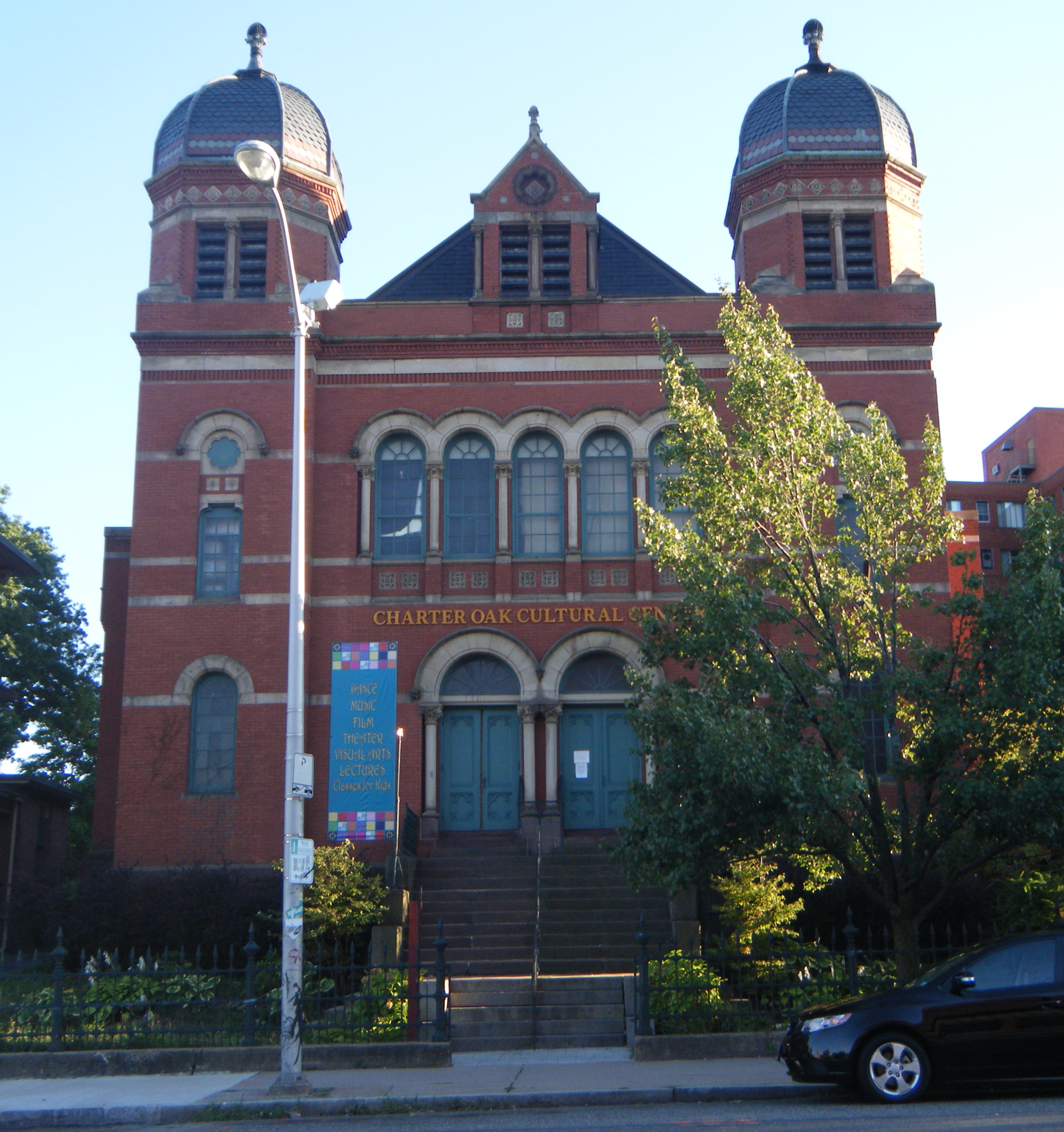
- The former synagogue, now cultural center, in Hartford, in 2010

- Location in Connecticut

Religion
- Affiliation: Reform Judaism (former); Baptistism (former)
- Ecclesiastical or organizational status: Synagogue (1876–1935); Church (1935–1974); Cultural center (current)
- Status: Closed (as a synagogue); Repurposed

Location
- Location: 21 Charter Oak Avenue, Hartford, Connecticut
- Country: United States
- Interactive map of Temple Beth Israel (1876)
- Coordinates: 41°45′33″N 72°40′29″W

Architecture
- Architect: George Keller
- Type: Synagogue
- Style: Romanesque Revival; High Victorian eclectic
- Established: 1843 (as a congregation)
- Groundbreaking: September 28, 1875
- Completed: 1876
- Construction cost: $35,567

Specifications
- Direction of façade: North
- Capacity: 600 worshipers
- Length: 85 feet (26 m)
- Width: 60 feet (18 m)
- Dome: Two
- Materials: Red brick; brownstone

Website
- charteroakcenter.org
- Temple Beth Israel (1876)
- U.S. National Register of Historic Places
- Area: 1 acre (0.40 ha)
- NRHP reference No.: 78002868
- Added to NRHP: December 1, 1978

Temple Beth Israel (transliterated from Hebrew as "House of Israel"), sometimes called Charter Oak Temple, is an historic former Reform Jewish synagogue and later church building, now cultural center, located at 21 Charter Oak Avenue, in Hartford, Connecticut, in the United States.

The congregation, established in 1843, and located in West Hartford since 1936, is one of the two oldest Jewish congregations in Connecticut and one of the largest Reform congregations in New England, with about 900 member families and about 2,000 individual members.

Designed by George Keller in the Romanesque Revival style and completed in 1876, the former synagogue building is the oldest purpose-built synagogue in Connecticut. The former synagogue building was added to the National Register of Historic Places in 1978. After being rescued from threatened demolition, the building now houses a local cultural center.

== Description and history ==
The former Temple Beth Israel building is located south of downtown Hartford in the Sheldon-Charter Oak neighborhood. It is on the south side of Charter Oak Avenue, just east its junction with Main Street and west of Charter Oak Park. The synagogue was designed by Keller and built in 1875-76 for a Jewish congregation established in 1843. In 1843 the State, at the instigation of the congregation's leadership, passed a law making it possible for Jewish congregations to build synagogues. The foundation stone was laid on September 25, 1875, as reported in a local newspaper:

"The ceremony was all the more novel from the fact that it was the first time a cornerstone had been laid for a synagogue in the State of Connecticut.... There was a gathering of ten or twelve thousand people. The roofs and windows of buildings in the vicinity were crowded, and many carriages filled the streets around the site."

— Hartford Courant, September 1875.

It is a 2-1/2 story red brick structure with a brownstone foundation and stone trim. It has a gabled roof, flanked at the front by two towers with octagonal domed cupolas. Windows and entrances are set in round-arch openings in the Romanesque style.

It is the only known High Victorian eclectic Romanesque work of Keller, who was one of Hartford's leading architects of the second half of the 20th century. The temple was used by that congregation until 1935, when it was sold for $31,000 to the Calvary Temple, a Christian Baptist congregation, which occupied it until 1974.

At the time of its listing on the National Register of Historic Places in 1978, the building was owned by the Hartford Redevelopment Agency and despite attempts to put it to other uses, remained unoccupied. After standing vacant for some years, in the late 1970s the city threatened to demolish it. Jewish groups around the state organized to preserve it, and it now houses the Charter Oak Cultural Center. The building was one of fifteen Connecticut synagogues added to the National Register of Historic Places in 1995 and 1996 in response to an unprecedented multiple submission, nominating nineteen synagogues.

== See also ==
- National Register of Historic Places listings in Hartford, Connecticut
- Oldest synagogues in the United States
