= Congregation Beth Israel (West Hartford, Connecticut) =

Historic Reform synagogue in West Hartford, Connecticut, US

Temple Beth Israel
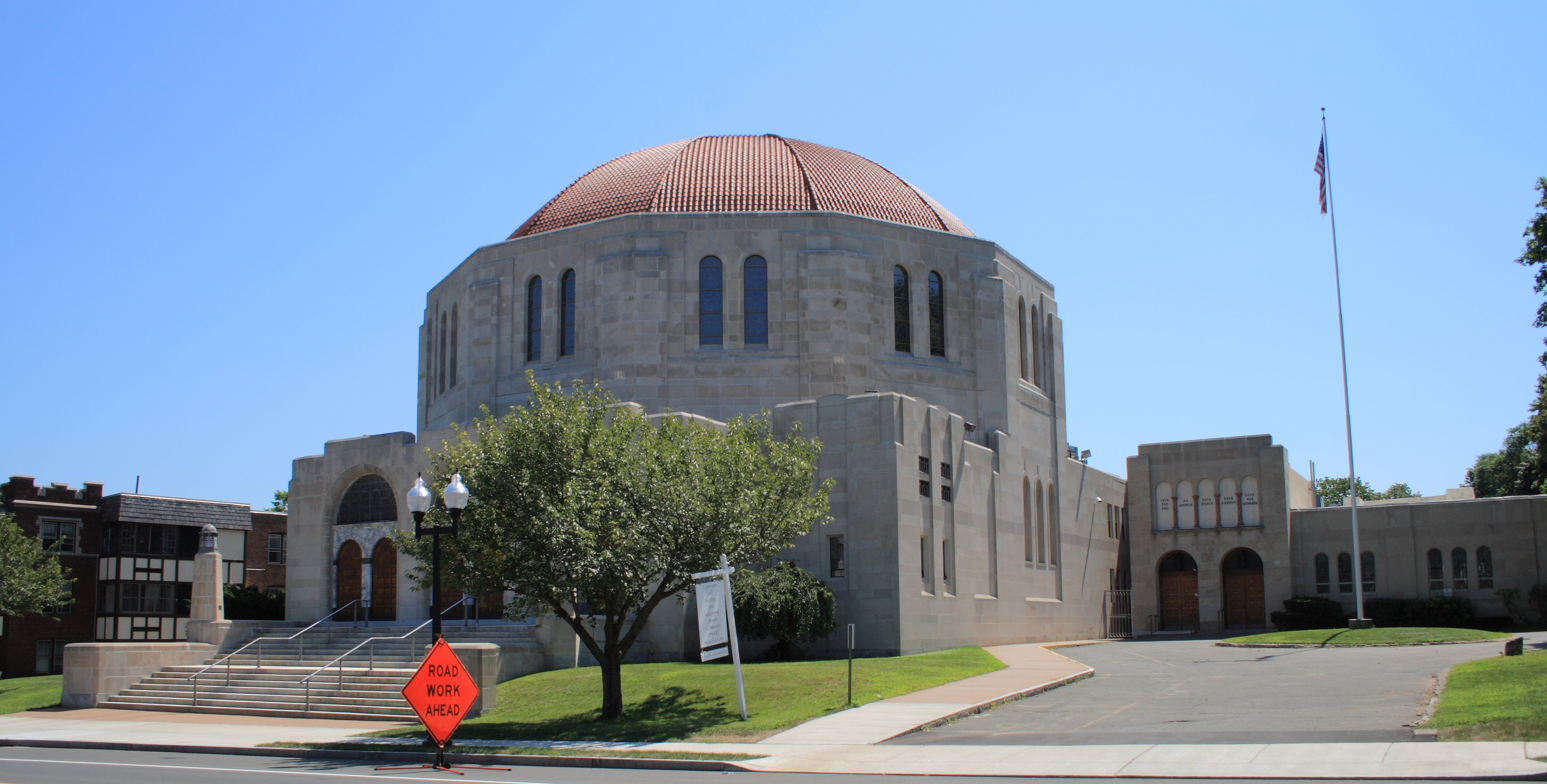
- The current synagogue in West Hartford, in 2008

- Location in Connecticut

Religion
- Affiliation: Reform Judaism
- Ecclesiastical or organisational status: Synagogue
- Leadership: Rabbi Michael Pincus; Rabbi Andi Fliegel; Rabbi Stephen Fuchs (Emeritus)
- Status: Active

Location
- Location: 701 Farmington Avenue, West Hartford, Connecticut 06119
- Country: United States
- Coordinates: 41°45′53″N 72°43′12″W

Architecture
- Architects: George Keller (1876); Charles R. Greco (1936)
- Type: Synagogue
- Style: 1876: Romanesque Revival; 1936: Art Deco; Byzantine Revival
- Established: 1843 (as a congregation)
- Completed: 1876 (NRHP-listed Charter Oak); 1936 (NRHP-listed West Hartford)
- Domes: Two (1876); One (1936)

Website
- cbict.org
- Temple Beth Israel (1876)
- U.S. National Register of Historic Places
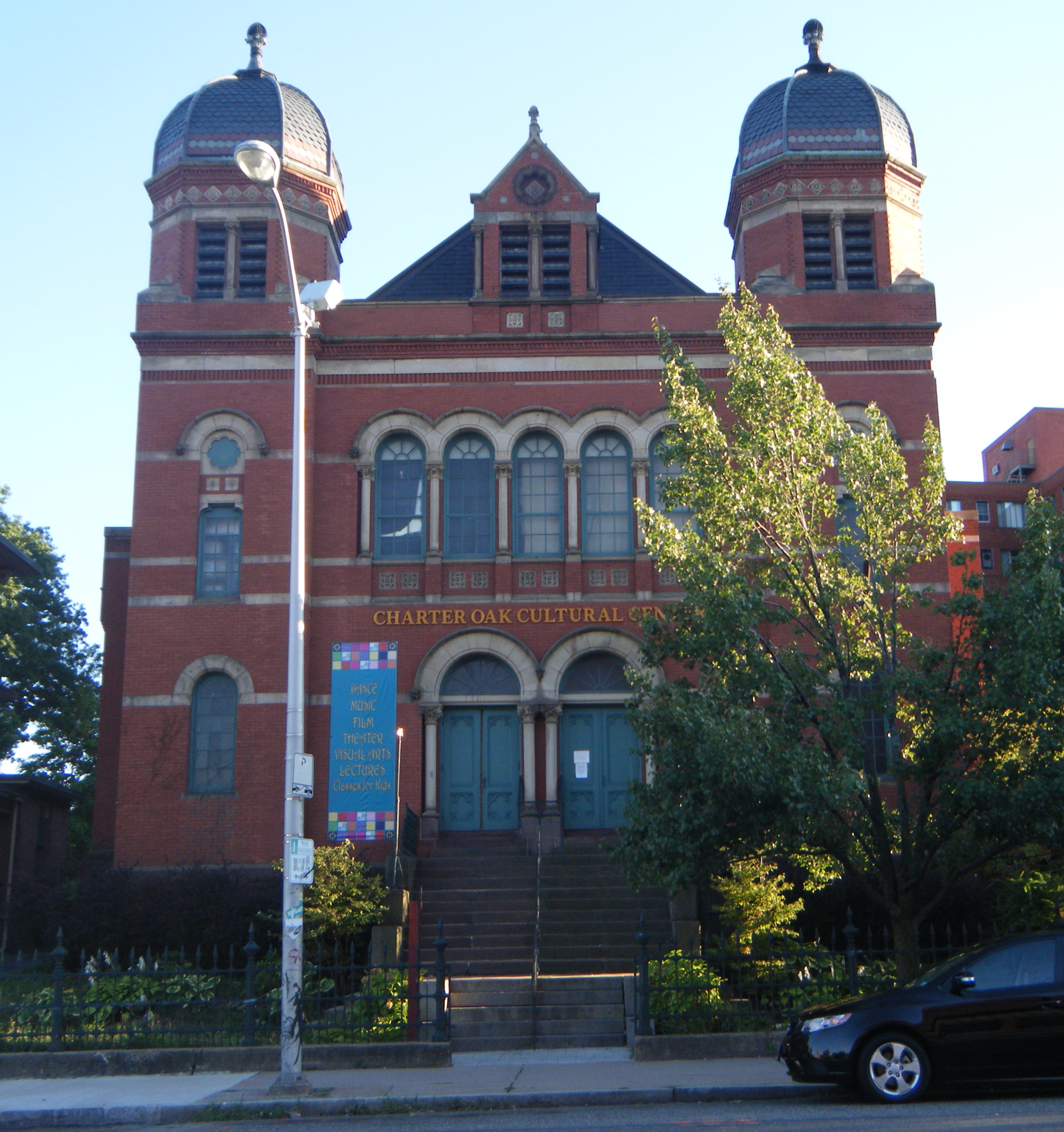
- The first synagogue, now cultural center, in 2010
- Location: 21 Charter Oak Avenue, Hartford, Connecticut
- Coordinates: 41°45′33″N 72°40′29″W
- Area: 1 acre (0.40 ha)
- NRHP reference No.: 78002868
- Added to NRHP: December 01, 1978
- Temple Beth Israel (1936)
- U.S. National Register of Historic Places
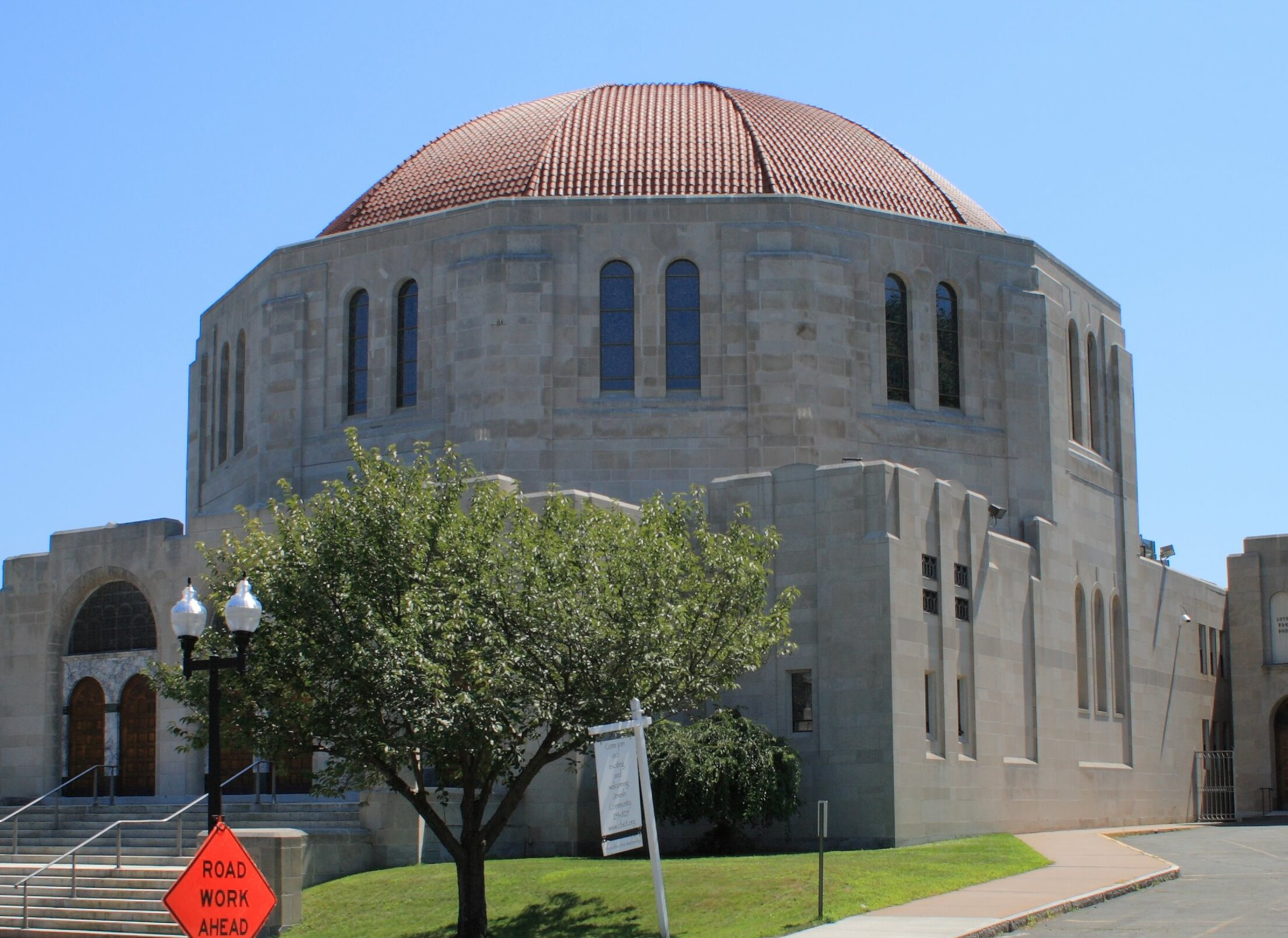
- The current synagogue building, in 2008
- MPS: Historic Synagogues of Connecticut MPS
- NRHP reference No.: 95001343
- Added to NRHP: November 27, 1995

Congregation Beth Israel (transliterated from the Hebrew as "House of Israel") is a Reform Jewish congregation and synagogue located at 701 Farmington Avenue in West Hartford, Connecticut.

Established in 1843, Beth Israel is one of the two oldest Jewish congregations in Connecticut and is one of the largest reform congregations in New England. Its membership includes about 750 families and about 2,000 individuals.

The congregation's first synagogue building on Charter Oak Avenue in Hartford, commonly called the Charter Oak Temple, was completed in 1876. It was designed by George Keller in the Romanesque Revival style and was added to the National Register of Historic Places in November 1978.

== History ==
=== Founding and affiliation ===
Beth Israel was founded in 1843, the same year the Connecticut legislature first permitted public worship by Jews. That year also saw the founding of Congregation Mishkan Israel. Originally an Orthodox congregation, Beth Israel adopted Reform practices relatively quickly, influenced in part by the immigration of German Jews to Hartford. In 1877, the congregation joined with other American Reform Jewish communities to form the Union of American Hebrew Congregations.

=== First synagogue ===
Congregation Beth Israel's first synagogue was built at 21 Charter Oak Avenue in Hartford in 1876. Though Beth Israel left the building in 1936, the building is occupied by the Charter Oak Cultural Center. It is among the oldest synagogue buildings still standing in the United States.

Beth Israel moved into its present location in 1936.

== Clergy ==
=== Rabbi Feldman ===
For most of the middle of the 20th century (1925–1977), Congregation Beth Israel was led by Rabbi Abraham J. Feldman, a leading exponent of Classical Reform philosophy.

Dr. Feldman was a nationally known Jewish leader. He received many awards, authored several books, and held important positions in various offices including the Connecticut Advisory Committee of the United States Commission on Civil Rights and American Jewish Committee. He was praised by President Dwight D. Eisenhower for "his outstanding leadership" and "bringing strength to the nation and hope to the free world".

=== Rabbi Silver ===
Rabbi Harold Silver succeeded Feldman in 1968. He served as senior rabbi for 25 years, retiring in 1993. Silver came from a family of rabbis, including the five generations preceding him. His father, Maxwell Silver, was a rabbi in New York City; his uncle, Abba Hillel Silver, was a rabbi in Cleveland, Ohio; and his grandfather, Moses Silver, was a rabbi in Jerusalem. Silver was ordained in 1951 at Hebrew Union College in New York City. Rabbi Silver's first rabbinate was as assistant rabbi at the Rodef Shalom Congregation in Pittsburgh. He later became rabbi at Temple Emanuel in Pittsburgh, where he served from 1955 until 1968, when he came to Congregation Beth Israel. Silver was prominent in the Hartford Jewish community. He organized the first Greater Hartford Rabbinical Board of Rabbis, which assembles rabbis from different Jewish congregations and movements. He also served on a variety of community boards, both Jewish and non-Jewish. Silver also promoted interfaith dialogue, preaching at many local churches, as well as encouraging peace and understanding between people of different faiths. Additionally, Silver taught courses on Judaism at local universities. He hired Connecticut's first female associate rabbi, Jody Cohen, bringing her to Beth Israel in 1984. Silver retired in 1993 and became rabbi emeritus. He died on March 9, 2017, at the age of 92.

=== Rabbi Glaser ===
Silver was succeeded by Rabbi Simeon Glaser in 1993, who served as assistant rabbi at Congregation Beth Israel at the end of Rabbi Silver's tenure as senior rabbi. Glaser was popular with young families and children because of his interest in and talent for music and song. Glaser put on lively services for the holidays of Purim and Simchas Torah; in these services, he, Cantor Green, and Assistant Rabbi Weiss sang, danced, and acted out stories of the holidays. After serving four years as senior rabbi, Glaser left Beth Israel, initially to serve at a small Conservative synagogue in Wethersfield, Connecticut, and then at Temple Israel in Minneapolis, Minnesota. Glaser passed away on April 18, 2023 at the age of 67.

=== Rabbi Fuchs ===
Rabbi Stephen Fuchs is a former president of the World Union for Progressive Judaism and rabbi emeritus of Congregation Beth Israel. He served as the primary rabbi of the congregation from 1997 to 2011.

=== Rabbi Pincus ===
Rabbi Michael Pincus served as associate rabbi (2004–2011) and rabbi of Congregation Beth Israel since 2012. He has shared his leadership position with Rabbi Andi Fliegel since 2016.

=== Rabbi Fliegel ===
Rabbi Andi Fliegel has served as associate rabbi of Congregation Beth Israel since 2016. She shares this leadership position with Rabbi Michael Pincus.

== Architecture ==
The congregation occupies a large building that is dominated by a Byzantine Revival dome. The building contains multiple parts: a sanctuary (on which the dome is built), a chapel, a religious school, a pre-school, offices, two meeting halls, a small museum, and a library. Both the sanctuary and the chapel feature stained-glass windows.

The 1936 building was designed by Charles R. Greco and built at the height of the Art Deco movement; the Byzantine revival form in Art Deco style provides a grand appearance. In 2006, the congregation was given the West Hartford Historic Preservation Award for its meticulous restoration of the historic structure.

The synagogue building was one of fifteen Connecticut synagogues added to the National Register of Historic Places in 1995 and 1996.

== Cemeteries ==
Congregation Beth Israel owns and maintains two cemeteries, in Avon, and Hartford.

== See also ==
- National Register of Historic Places listings in West Hartford, Connecticut
- Oldest synagogues in the United States
- Universal Health Care Foundation of Connecticut
