= River Street Firehouse =

- U.S. National Register of Historic Places
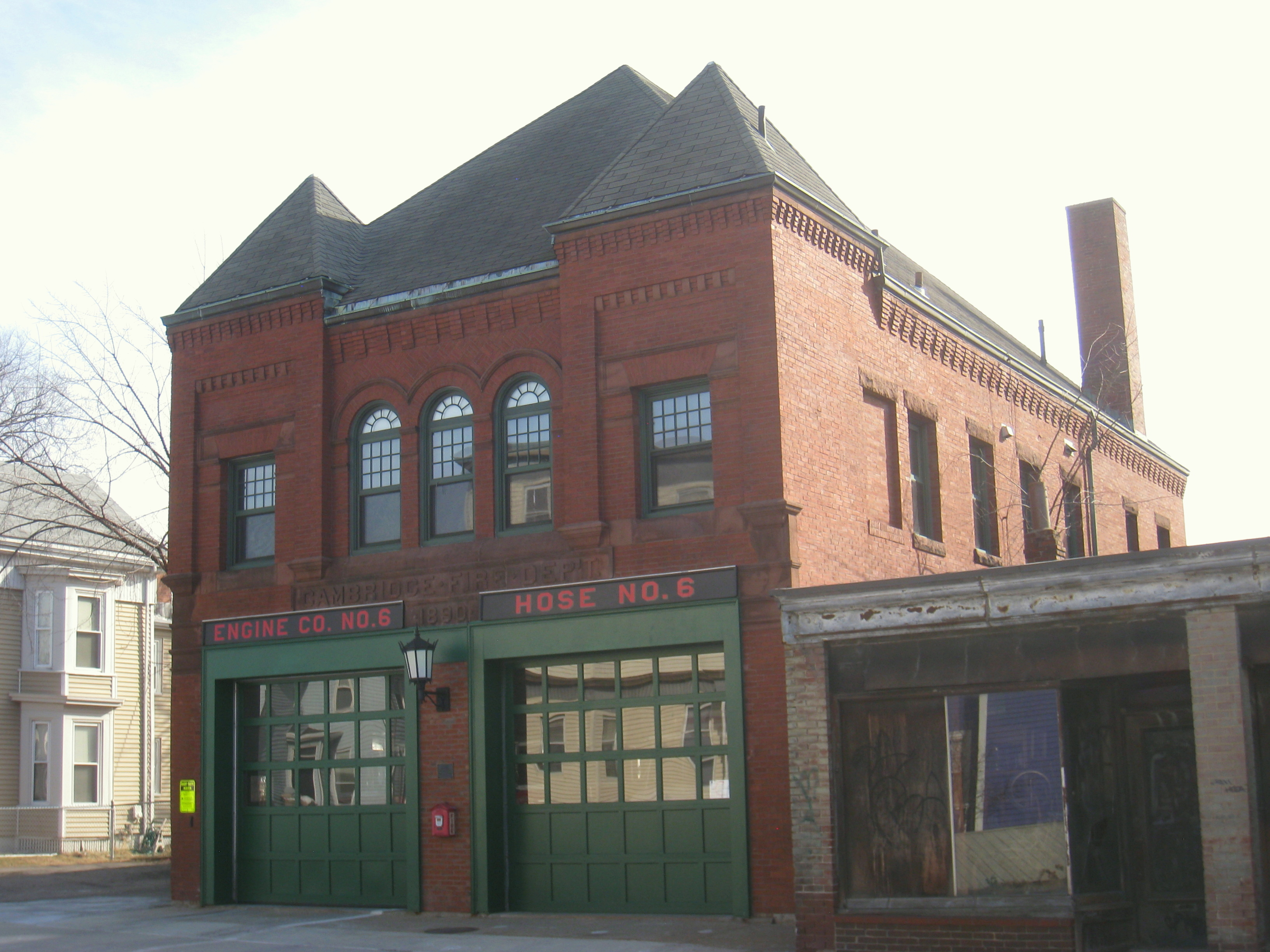

- Location within Massachusetts Location within the United States
- Location: Cambridge, Massachusetts
- Coordinates: 42°21′47.8″N 71°06′36.0″W
- Area: 1 acre (0.40 ha)
- Built: 1890
- Architect: George Fogerty
- Architectural style: Queen Anne
- MPS: Cambridge MRA
- NRHP reference No.: 82001973
- Added to NRHP: April 13, 1982

River Street Firehouse is an historic firehouse at 176 River Street in Cambridge, Massachusetts. It is a two-story brick building, with a hip roof and two vehicle bays. It was designed by local architect George Fogerty in the Queen Anne style, and was completed in 1890. It has short towers with pyramidal roofs at the front corners, and has decorative herringbone brickwork. The building was listed on the National Register of Historic Places in 1982.

The firehouse has been the home of Engine 6 of the Cambridge Fire Department since the building's construction.

== See also ==
- Taylor Square Firehouse, Cambridge
- National Register of Historic Places listings in Cambridge, Massachusetts
