= Jody Cohen =

American rabbi (born 1954)

- Born: September 21, 1954 (age 71); Newark, New Jersey, US
- Education: Mount Holyoke College (BA); Hebrew Union College (MA)
- Occupation: Rabbi
- Employer(s): Congregation Beth Israel; Union for Reform Judaism
- Known for: First woman rabbi to serve at a Connecticut congregation
- Movement: Reform Judaism
- Awards: Connecticut Women's Hall of Fame inductee (1994)

Jody Cohen (born September 21, 1954) is an American retired rabbi who became the first woman to serve as rabbi for a Jewish congregation in Connecticut. In 1984, she became the first female associate rabbi to serve a Connecticut congregation at Congregation Beth Israel in West Hartford. There she founded Noah's Ark, the first synagogue-run preschool daycare in North America. Cohen went on to serve as solo rabbi at Temple Beth Hillel in South Windsor—another first—from 1989 to 1995.

Cohen was an inaugural inductee into the Connecticut Women's Hall of Fame in 1994.

== Life and career ==
Born and raised in Newark, New Jersey, Cohen received her BA in political science from Mount Holyoke College in 1976 and her MA in Hebrew Letters from the New York campus of Hebrew Union College, where she was ordained in May 1984. Moving to Connecticut that same year, she spent the ensuing decade as the first woman rabbi at Reform Judaism congregations in Greater Hartford. Cohen received the inaugural Hartford College for Women's Pioneer Woman Award (1985), organized the first Conference for Clergywomen of Greater Hartford (1986), and served as co-president of the Women's Rabbinic Network from 1991 to 1993. She also hosted the first HIV/AIDS interfaith healing service at any Greater Hartford synagogue.

After moving to Florida with her husband, Moshe Cohen-Gavarian, and two sons, Cohen worked as the regional director for the Union for Reform Judaism from 1997 to 2007. From 2007 to 2012, she served as senior rabbi at Temple Israel of Greater Miami. She received an honorary Doctor of Divinity degree from the Hebrew Union College–Jewish Institute of Religion in 2009. She started her own company working as a hospice chaplain before retiring in 2018.
