= Memorial Drive Apartments Historic District =

Historic district in Massachusetts, United States

- U.S. National Register of Historic Places
- U.S. Historic district
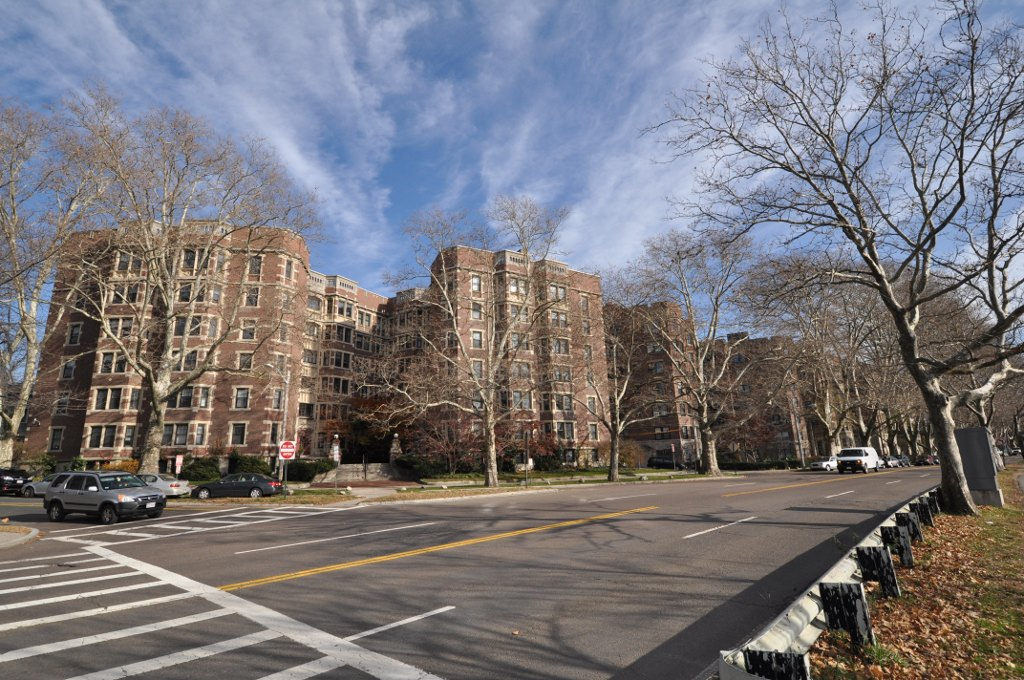
- View from southwest of the apartments, just across Mem. Drive

- Location within Massachusetts Location within the United States
- Location: Cambridge, Massachusetts
- Coordinates: 42°22′22″N 71°7′33″W
- Area: 1.8 acres (0.73 ha)
- Architect: W.L. Mowll
- Architectural style: Colonial Revival, Tudor Revival
- MPS: Cambridge MRA
- NRHP reference No.: 86001310
- Added to NRHP: May 19, 1986

The Memorial Drive Apartments Historic District is a historic district encompassing four apartment houses on Memorial Drive in Cambridge, Massachusetts. They are located between the Anderson Memorial Bridge and the Eliot Bridge with street numbers ranging from 983 to 993 Memorial Drive. All four buildings were built between 1916 and 1924, not long after Memorial Drive had been laid out, and were, despite significant similarities of style, designed by three different architects. All provide good views of the Charles River. The district was listed on the National Register of Historic Places in 1986.

Strathcona-on-the-Charles (992-993 Memorial Drive) was the first to be built. Designed by W. L. Mowll, it stands on an irregularly shaped lot with curving frontage, and was designed with deep courtyards, a style originated by Ralph Adams Cram, that provided every unit with a view of the river or the courtyard. Radnor Hall (983-984 Memorial Drive) and Hampstead Hall (985-986) followed soon after, in 1916, designed by Charles R. Greco. They differ from the Strathcona in their general styling (Georgian vs. Tudor), deeper courtyards, and in their first floors, which are finished in cast stone instead of brick. Barrington Court (987-989) was the last to be built, in 1924, to a design by R. B. Whitten. It has the deepest courtyard of the four buildings, and is the most symmetrical in appearance. The four buildings are of roughly equal height, and form a distinctive landmark on that portion of the river.

== See also ==
- National Register of Historic Places listings in Cambridge, Massachusetts
