= Radding Building =

- U.S. National Register of Historic Places
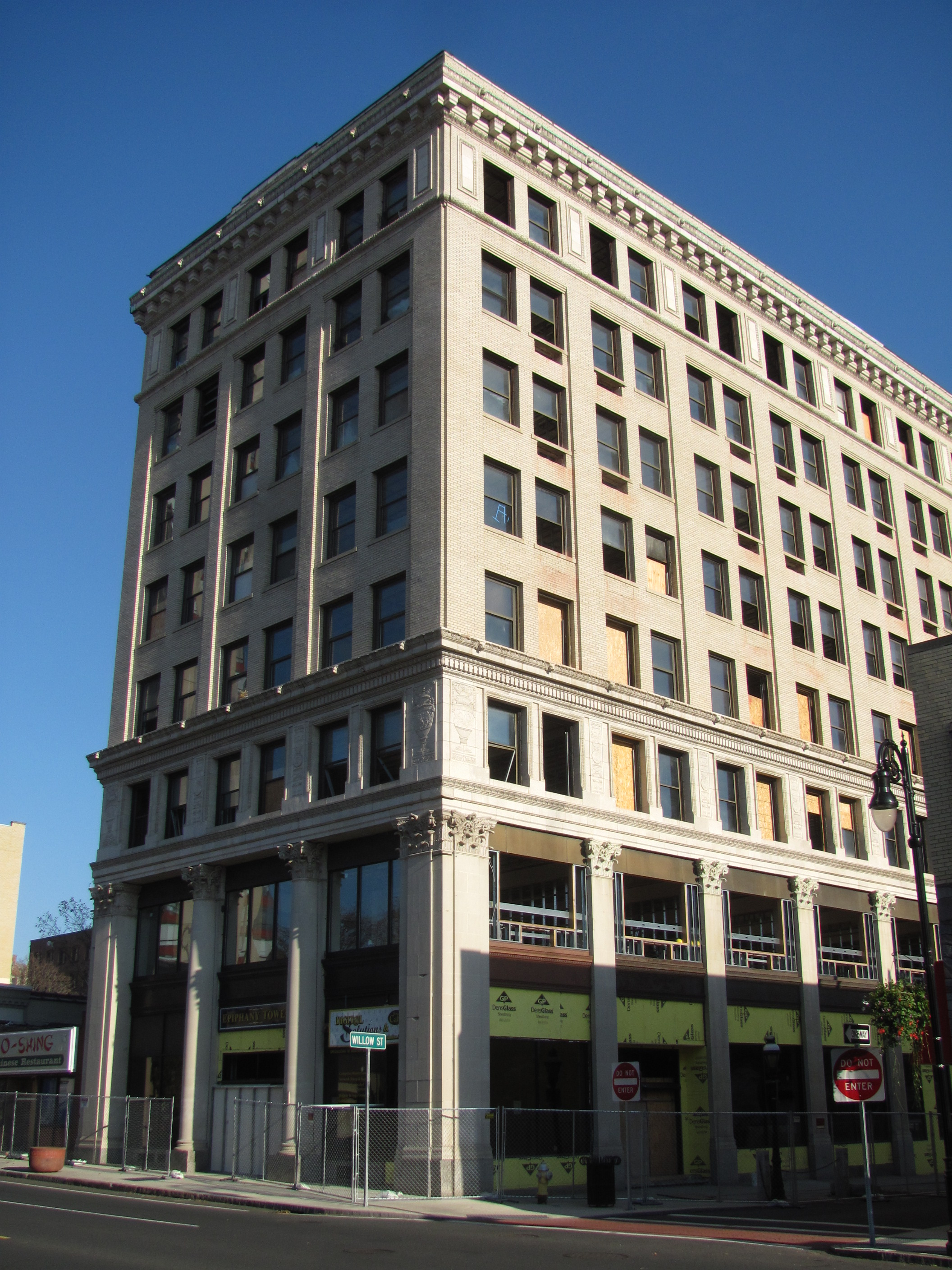
- Radding Building

- Location within Massachusetts Location within the United States
- Location: 143-147 State St., Springfield, Massachusetts
- Coordinates: 42°6′4″N 72°35′13″W
- Area: less than one acre
- Built: 1915
- Architect: Greco, Charles R.
- Architectural style: Classical Revival
- MPS: Downtown Springfield MRA
- NRHP reference No.: 83000762
- Added to NRHP: February 24, 1983

The Radding Building (formerly known as Epiphany Tower) is a large historic commercial building at 143-147 State Street in downtown Springfield, Massachusetts, it is currently used as a hotel for Holiday Inn Express. It is one of the tallest and most prominent buildings on State Street, it was built in 1915 by Edward Radding to a Classical Revival design by local architect Charles R. Greco. The building has been known for many years as the headquarters of the Mutual Fire Assurance Company. It was listed on the National Register of Historic Places in 1983.

== Description and history ==
The Radding Building occupies a prominent location on State Street, a major east-west road in downtown Springfield, It stands on the south side of the road at its junction with Willow Street, along which it extends for a whole city block. Its location is across the street from the MassMutual Center, a sports facility and convention center. The Radding Building is eight stories in height, its principal street facades finished in stone and pale brick. The ground stage is two stories in height, articulated on the State Street facade by corner pilasters and engaged round columns between the bays, all with Corinthian capitals. On the Willow Street facade, the bays are articulated by pilasters. An entablature runs on both facades between the second and third floors, and there are cornices above the third and seventh floors. Windows are set in pairs between the pilasters, with decorative panels between the bays on the third floor. The building is capped by a bracketed cornice and low parapet.

The building was constructed in 1915, replacing a residential tenement house that stood on the site. Edward Radding, for whom it was built, was a real estate developer who located his offices in the building. Tenants over time included a wide variety of organizations, its facilities including offices, auditoriums, and other meeting spaces. The Mutual Fire Assurance Company, founded in 1827 as an insurer of residences, first leased space in the building 1943, and became its major tenant in 1949.

== Current Use ==
On April 27, 2018 a 98-room Holiday Inn Express hotel opened at the former Epiphany Tower on 145 State St.

== See also ==
- National Register of Historic Places listings in Springfield, Massachusetts
- National Register of Historic Places listings in Hampden County, Massachusetts

Media related to National Register of Historic Places in Springfield, Massachusetts at Wikimedia Commons
