= Taylor Square Firehouse =

- U.S. National Register of Historic Places
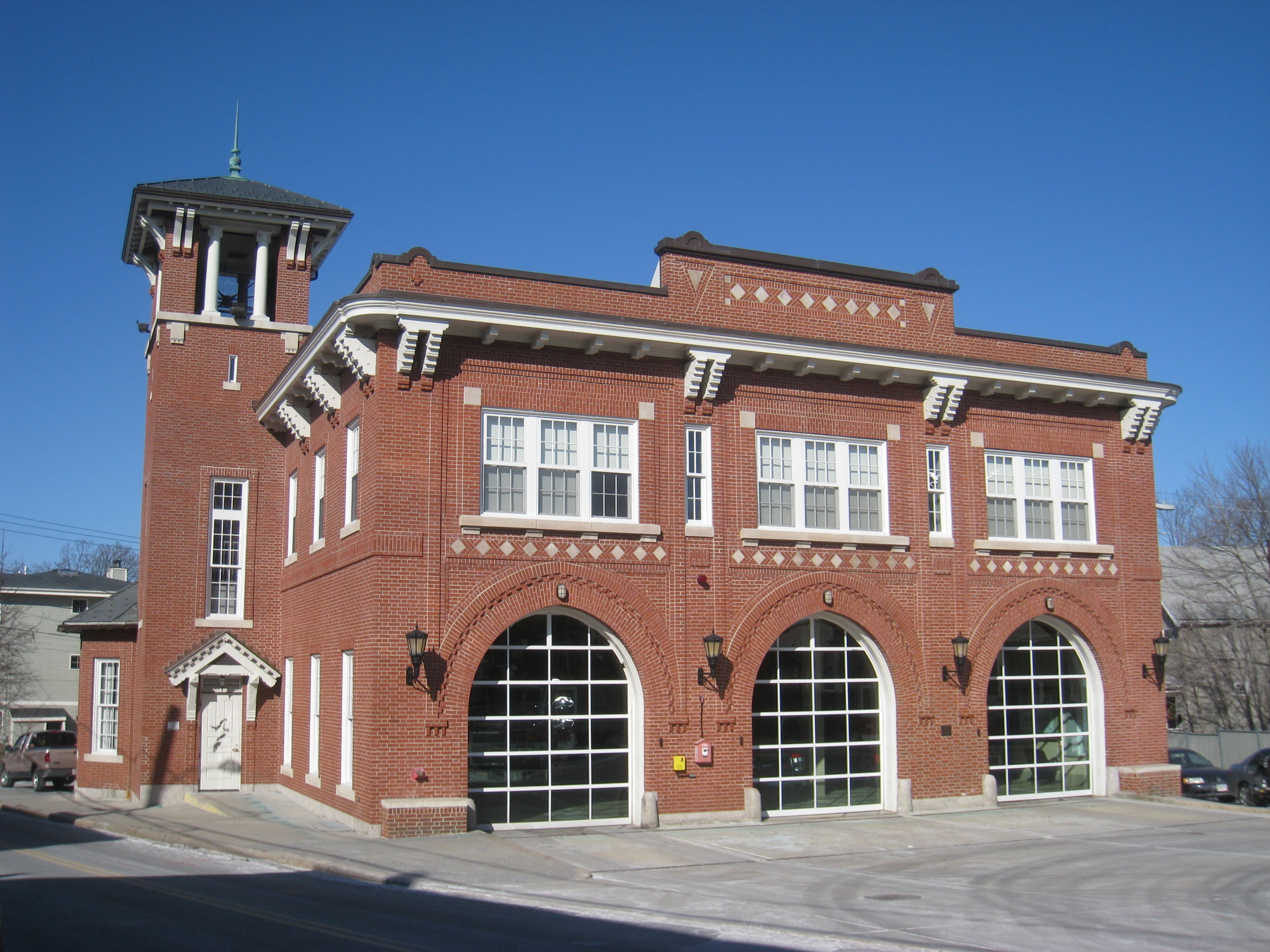

- Location within Massachusetts Location within the United States
- Location: Cambridge, Massachusetts
- Coordinates: 42°23′3.3″N 71°7′47.6″W
- Built: 1904
- Architect: Charles R. Greco
- MPS: Cambridge MRA
- NRHP reference No.: 82001979
- Added to NRHP: April 13, 1982

The Taylor Square Firehouse is an historic fire station at 113 Garden Street in Cambridge, Massachusetts. The stylistically eclectic brick building was built in 1904 to a design by local architect Charles R. Greco. Although it has a somewhat standard building plan dictated by its function, the building has exotic architectural details, including a projecting cornice with large wooden brackets, patterned brickwork on the parapet, and Moorish Revival decoration of the truck bay arches. It is the most elaborate of the fire stations built by the city in that period.

The building was listed on the National Register of Historic Places in 1982.

== See also ==
- River Street Firehouse, Cambridge
- National Register of Historic Places listings in Cambridge, Massachusetts
