= St. Joseph Catholic Church (Roxbury, Massachusetts) =

Historic church in Massachusetts, US

- St. Joseph's Roman Catholic Church Complex
- U.S. National Register of Historic Places
- U.S. Historic district
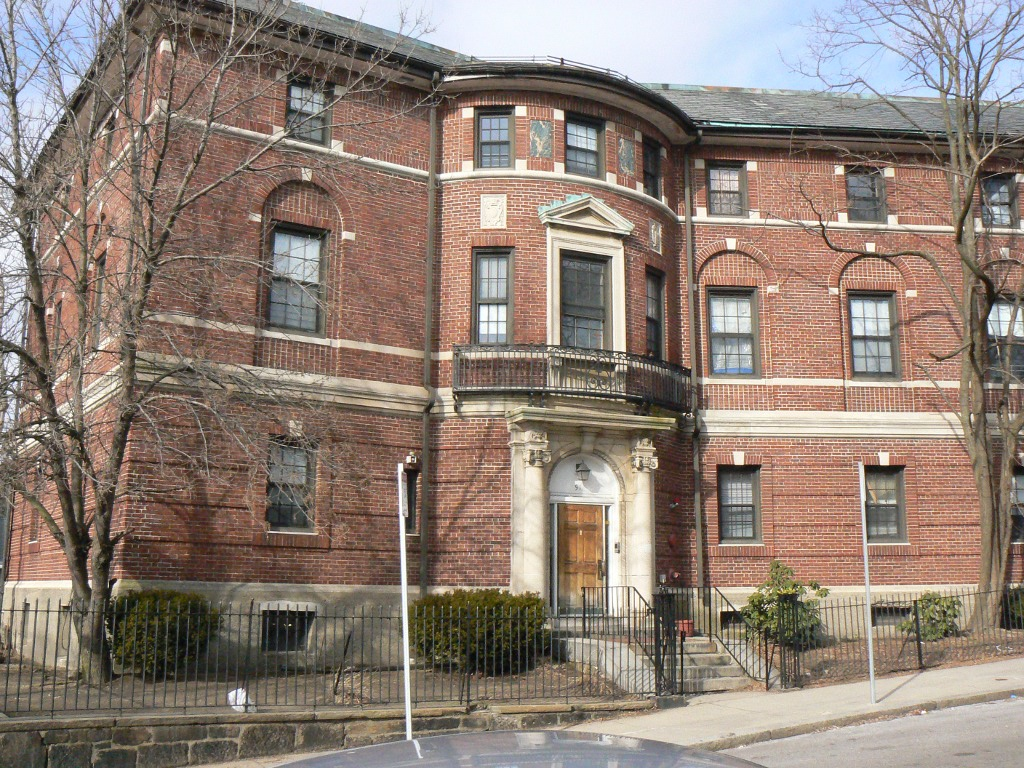
- One of the former parish buildings, now housing

- Location within Massachusetts Location within the United States
- Location: Roxbury, Boston, Massachusetts
- Coordinates: 42°19′26″N 71°5′16″W
- Built: 1845
- Architect: Patrick C. Keeley
- Architectural style: Second Empire, Romanesque
- NRHP reference No.: 89002169
- Added to NRHP: December 28, 1989

St. Joseph Catholic Church was a Catholic parish in the Archdiocese of Boston, serving the Roxbury neighborhood of Boston, Massachusetts, US. The parish was established in 1845, and a church was built in the same year. The entire church complex, including the rectory, convent and parish school, was added to the National Register of Historic Places in 1989. The parish was closed by the archdiocese in 2002, after which the property was sold.

== Cemetery ==
As was common in the 19th century, the parish property included space for a cemetery, which was blessed in 1850. However, due to its small size, the cemetery had filled by 1868. There were about 600 people (mostly Irish immigrants from County Donegal) buried in the cemetery. After 1882, the city mapmakers ceased including it and the parish gradually forgot that it existed. As early as 1887, when the parish grammar school was built next to it, there seemed to be no recognition of the cemetery. It was nothing more than a field with no visible gravestones.

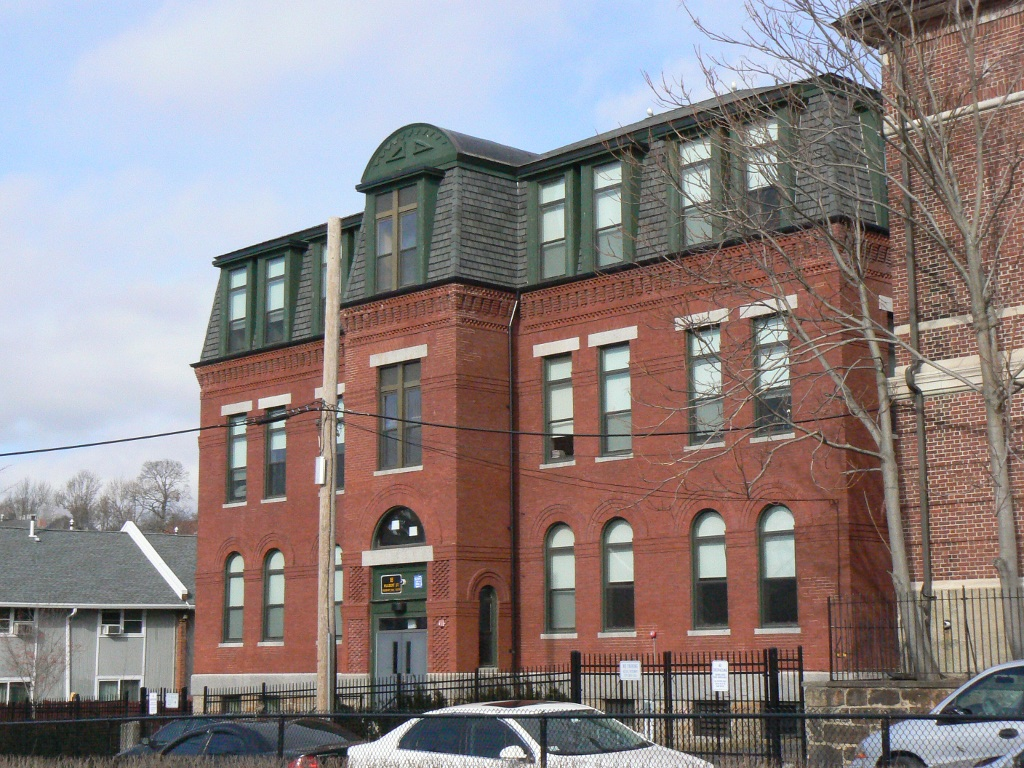
A former parish property, now used as a charter school

However, in the 1990s, a construction crew discovered a gravestone while digging a trench. The digging stopped, but no other artifacts were found. Again, in 2006, digging commenced. The parish property had been sold by the archdiocese and the parish needed confirmation that there were no longer human remains on site. When a bone was found, the Massachusetts Historical Commission investigated the site and discovered the forgotten graves. All of the remains that were found at St. Joseph Cemetery were re-interred at Calvary Cemetery in Waltham.

== See also ==
- National Register of Historic Places listings in southern Boston, Massachusetts
