= Bellefaire Orphanage =

Coordinates: 41°29′16″N 81°31′30″W

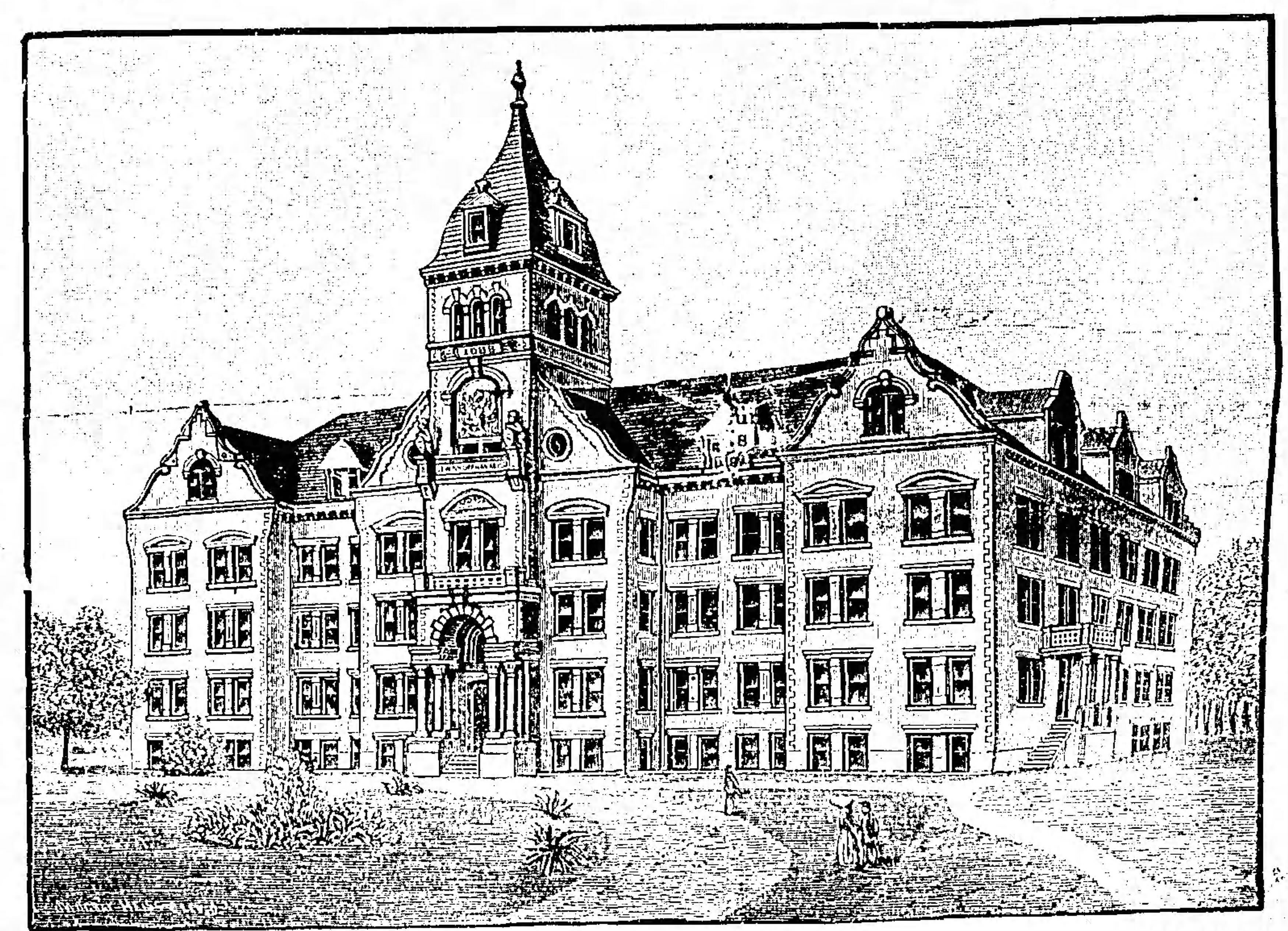
The Jewish Orphan Asylum Sketch published in The American Israelite, Fri Jul 6 1888, Page 1

The Bellefaire Orphanage was a Jewish orphanage in Cleveland Ohio founded in 1868 as an orphanage for children who lost their parents in the Civil War, making it one of the oldest orphanages in the US.

The orphanage was established by the Midwest division of B'nai B'rith, an international Jewish social service organization. B'nai B'rith purchased a building that had been built by Dr Seele as the Cleveland Water Cure Establishment in 1848. This building originally "was a combination sanitarium and resort for the treatment of various ailments and diseases through hydropathy" "enjoying regional popularity for nearly 2 decades", before being sold in 1868 to the B'nai B'rith organisation, and initially being called the Jewish Orphan Asylum.

From 1868 to 1918, the Jewish Orphan Asylum "was the home for 3,581 mostly immigrant eastern European boys and girls. Established originally to serve orphaned and destitute Jewish youngsters from 15 midwestern and southern states", and "was located on over seven acres of land near Fifty-fifth Street and Woodland Avenue." In 1919, as part of the transformation to a more humane place to live, the name was changed to Jewish Orphan Home. "In 1929 the orphanage was relocated to a 30-acre (12 ha) site in University Heights, an eastern suburb of Cleveland, where it was built as a cottage-type orphanage and renamed Bellefaire. Bellefaire continued as an orphanage for Jewish children until 1943, when it became a residential treatment center for emotionally disturbed children".
