= Eastern Middlesex County Second District Court =

- U.S. National Register of Historic Places
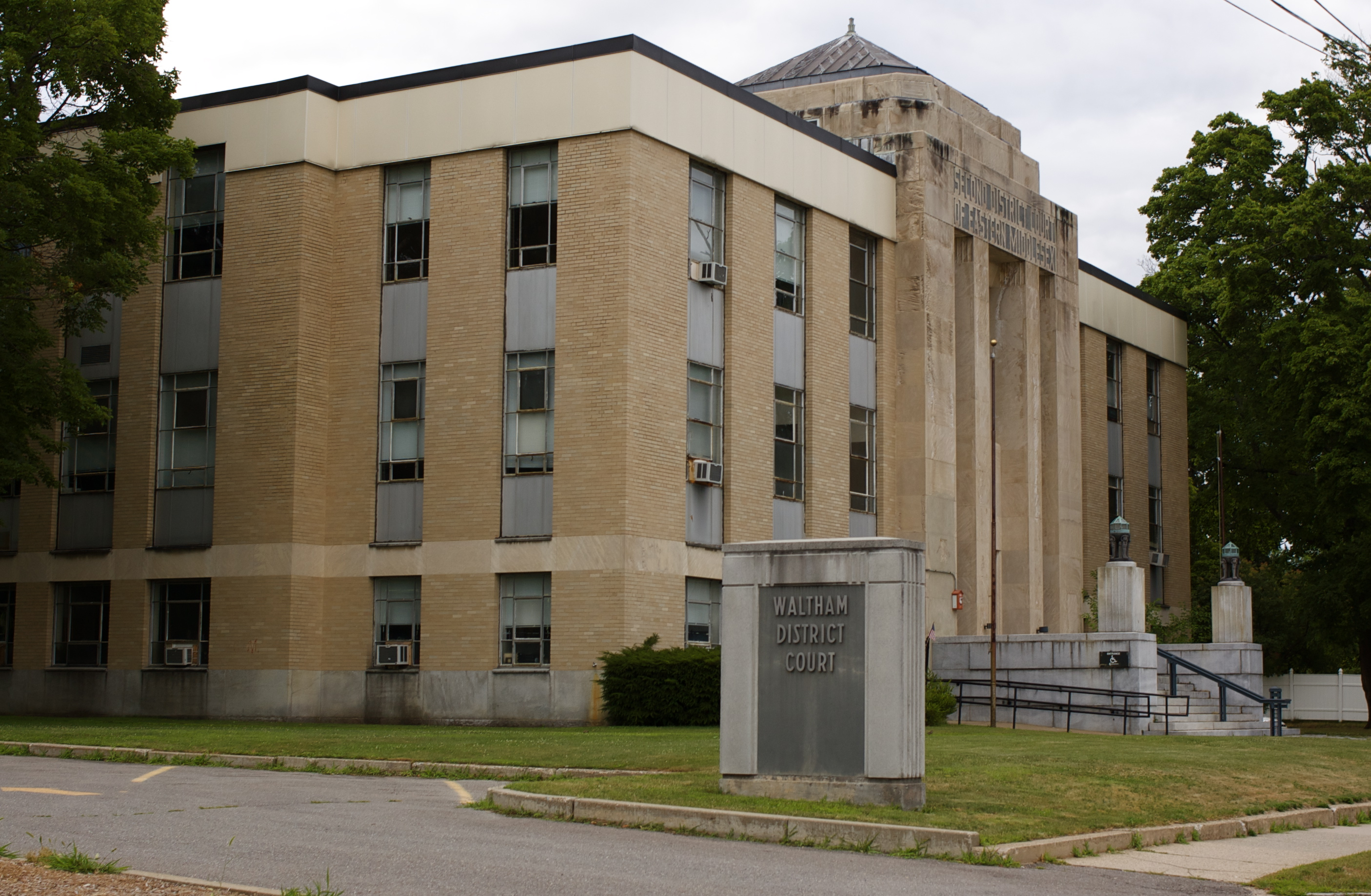

- Location within Massachusetts Location within the United States
- Location: 38 Linden St., Waltham, Massachusetts
- Coordinates: 42°22′40″N 71°13′30″W
- Built: 1938
- Architect: Charles R. Greco
- Architectural style: Art Deco
- MPS: Waltham MRA
- NRHP reference No.: 89001516
- Added to NRHP: September 28, 1989

The Eastern Middlesex County Second District Court is a historic courthouse of the Massachusetts District Court at 38 Linden Street in Waltham, Massachusetts. Built in 1938-40, it is one of three Art Deco buildings in the city, and its most fully realized example of the style. The building was listed on the National Register of Historic Places in 1989.

== Description and history ==
The Eastern Middlesex County Second District Court is located on the north side of Linden Street, just north of Main Street (United States Route 20) in eastern Waltham. It is a two-story building, built out of yellow brick with cast stone trim, set on a raised foundation. A pavilion projects slightly from the center of the main facade, with a flight of steps leading to the entrance, flanked by tall stone "shoulders" with distinctive ram's head lamps. The pavilion has three tall bays, demarcated by cast stone pillars, with window openings filled with glass bricks, and the main entrance with heavy double doors at the center. The pavilion is topped by a pyramidal roof with skylight. The interior lobby space has mosaic tile walls.

The building was designed by Charles R. Greco, a Cambridge native, whose firm provided designs for a number of area courthouses and armories. This courthouse was built 1938-40, and was the first major expansion of the Eastern District court, which had previously sat only in the courthouse in East Cambridge. It is Waltham's most elaborate example of Art Deco architecture.

== See also ==
- National Register of Historic Places listings in Waltham, Massachusetts
