= Building at 102–104 Inman Street =

Historic house in Massachusetts, United States

- U.S. National Register of Historic Places
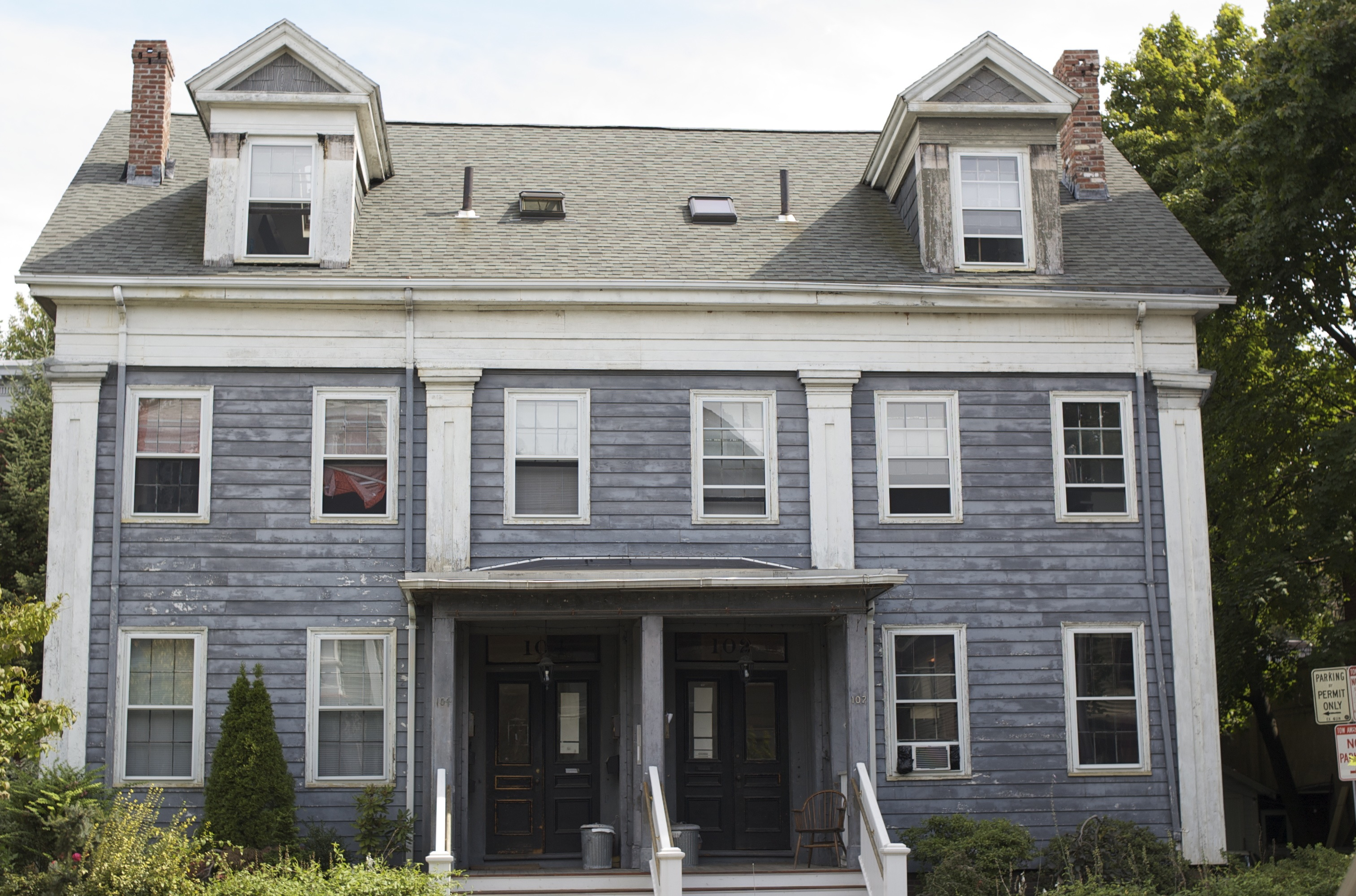

- Location within Massachusetts Location within the United States
- Location: 102–104 Inman St., Cambridge, Massachusetts
- Coordinates: 42°22′19.1″N 71°06′04.8″W
- Built: 1845
- Architect: William Ricker, David Chandler
- Architectural style: Greek Revival
- MPS: Cambridge MRA
- NRHP reference No.: 83000790
- Added to NRHP: June 30, 1983

102–104 Inman Street is a historic house located in Cambridge, Massachusetts. It is locally significant as one of a series of well-preserved Greek Revival duplexes on Inman Street.

== Description and history ==
It is a two-story wood-frame structure, six bays wide, with a side-gable roof and a central porch sheltering the pair of entrances. The house was built in 1845, and features very straightforward Greek Revival styling, most notably in the pilasters that run the full two-story height of the building, separating pairs of bays. The gable dormers in the roof have full pediments and pilasters.

The building was listed on the National Register of Historic Places on June 30, 1983.

== See also ==
- Building at 106–108 Inman Street
- Buildings at 110–112 Inman Street
- National Register of Historic Places listings in Cambridge, Massachusetts
