= Building at 106–108 Inman Street =

Historic house in Massachusetts, United States

- Building at 106–108 Inman St
- U.S. National Register of Historic Places
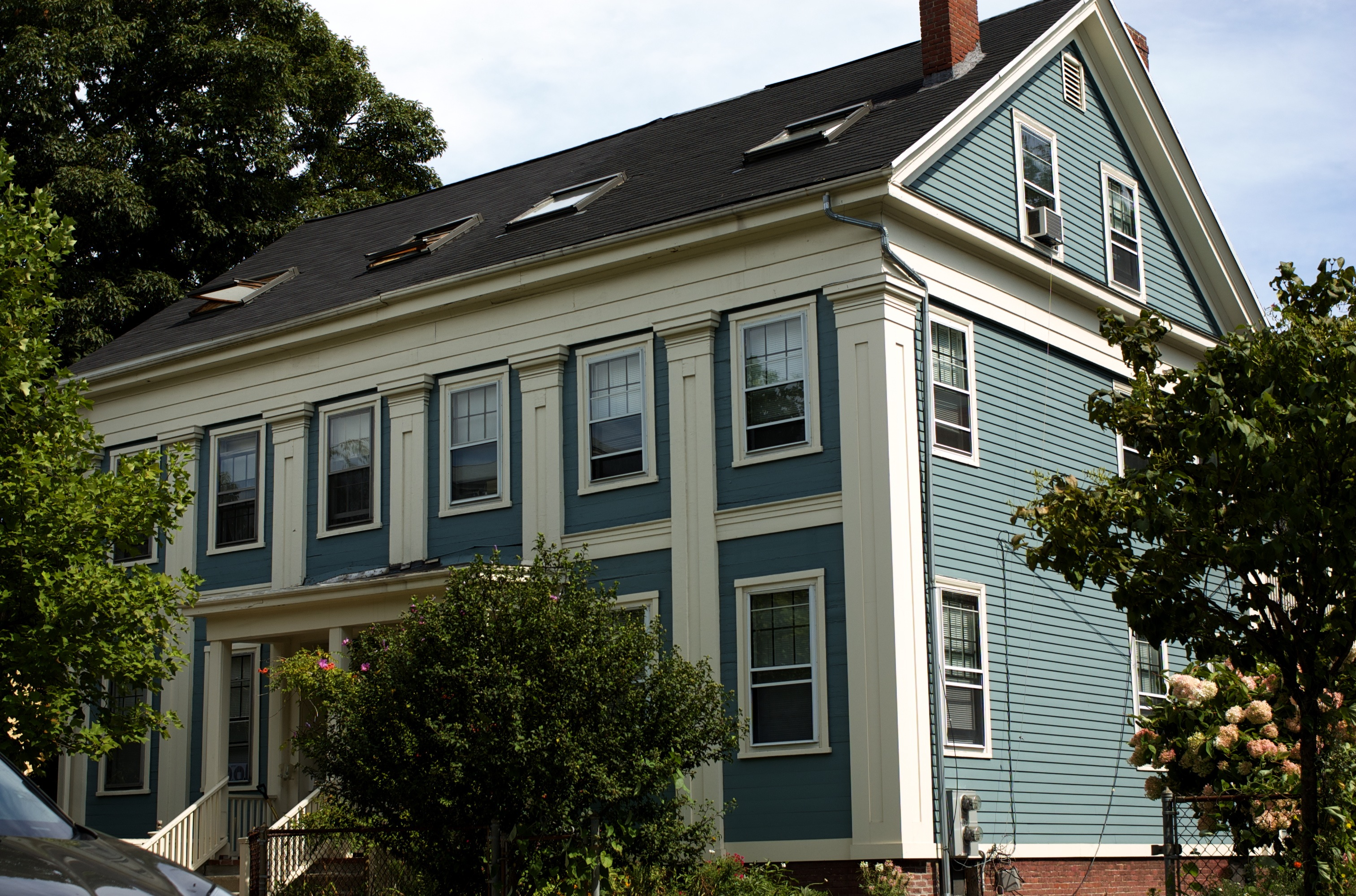

- Location within Massachusetts Location within the United States
- Location: 106–108 Inman St., Cambridge, Massachusetts
- Coordinates: 42°22′20″N 71°06′04″W
- Built: 1845
- Architect: William Ricker, David Chandler
- Architectural style: Greek Revival
- MPS: Cambridge MRA
- NRHP reference No.: 82001927
- Added to NRHP: April 13, 1982

The Building at 106–108 Inman Street in Cambridge, Massachusetts is one of a series of well-preserved Greek Revival duplexes on Inman Street. This house was built in 1845, and features very straightforward Greek Revival styling, most notably in the pilasters that run the full two story height of the building, separating each of the front facade's bays. The building has a later Italianate porch sheltering the centered entrances.

The building was listed on the National Register of Historic Places in 1982.

== See also ==
- Building at 102–104 Inman Street
- Buildings at 110–112 Inman Street
- National Register of Historic Places listings in Cambridge, Massachusetts
