= Buildings at 110–112 Inman Street =

Historic house in Massachusetts, United States

- U.S. National Register of Historic Places
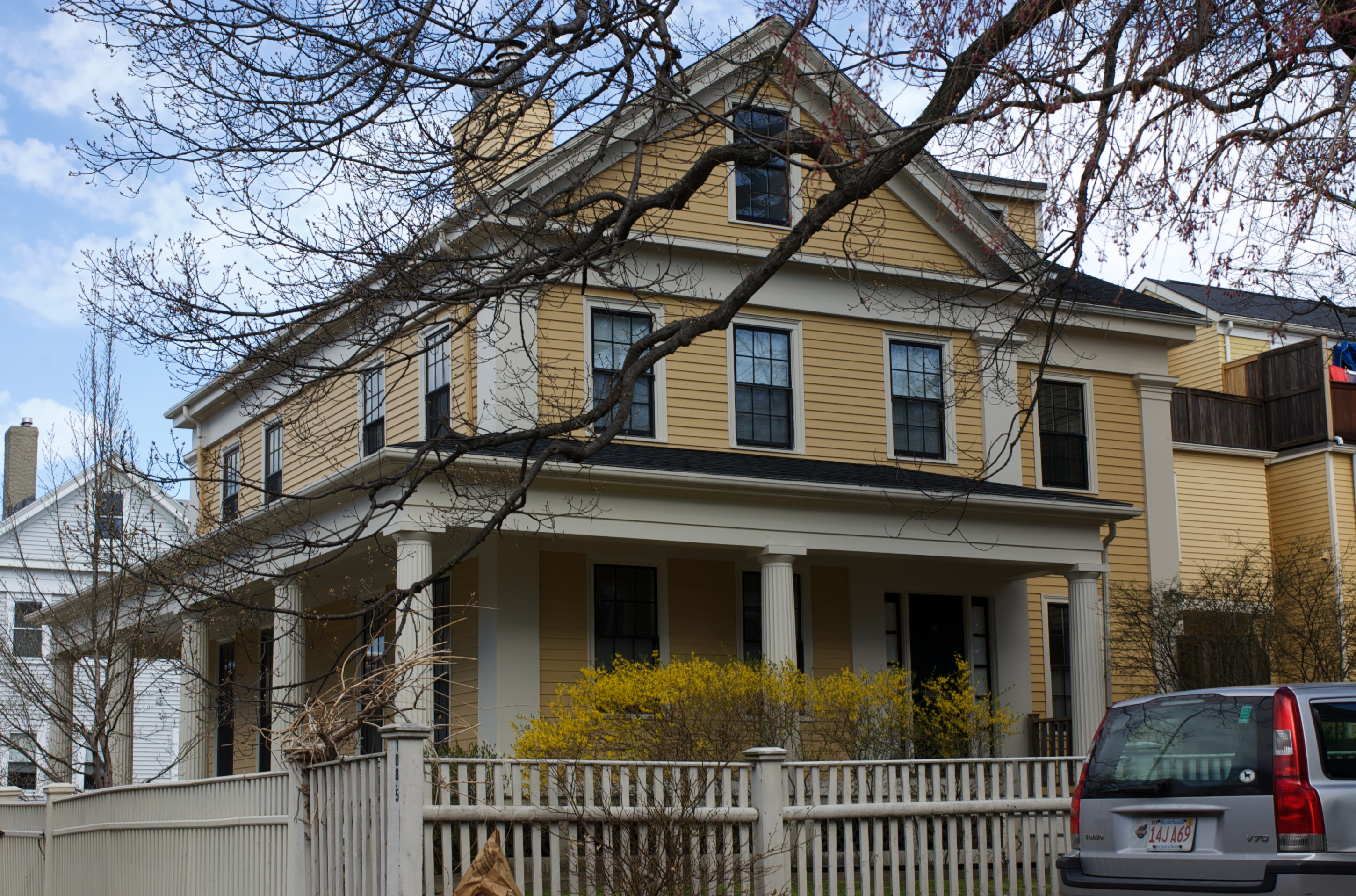

- Location within Massachusetts Location within the United States
- Location: 110–112 Inman St., Cambridge, Massachusetts
- Coordinates: 42°22′20.9″N 71°06′03.6″W
- Built: 1845
- Architect: William Ricker, David Chandler
- Architectural style: Greek Revival
- MPS: Cambridge MRA
- NRHP reference No.: 82001929
- Added to NRHP: April 13, 1982

The Buildings at 110i112 Inman Street in Cambridge, Massachusetts are part of a series of well-preserved Greek Revival duplexes on Inman Street. It is a two-story wood-frame structure, with a side gable roof and clapboard siding. It was built in 1845, and features very straightforward Greek Revival styling, most notably in the corner pilasters and the fully pedimented gable end. The porch with fluted columns wraps around three sides of the building, differentiating it from the other nearby Greek Revival duplexes.

The buildings were listed on the National Register of Historic Places in 1982.

== See also ==
- Building at 102–104 Inman Street
- Building at 106–108 Inman Street
- National Register of Historic Places listings in Cambridge, Massachusetts
