= Urban Rowhouse =

Urban Rowhouse is the name of several properties:

- Urban Rowhouse (30–38 Pearl Street, Cambridge, Massachusetts)
- Urban Rowhouse (40–48 Pearl Street, Cambridge, Massachusetts)
- Urban Rowhouse (26–32 River Street, Cambridge, Massachusetts)
