= Urban Rowhouse (40–48 Pearl Street, Cambridge, Massachusetts) =

- U.S. National Register of Historic Places
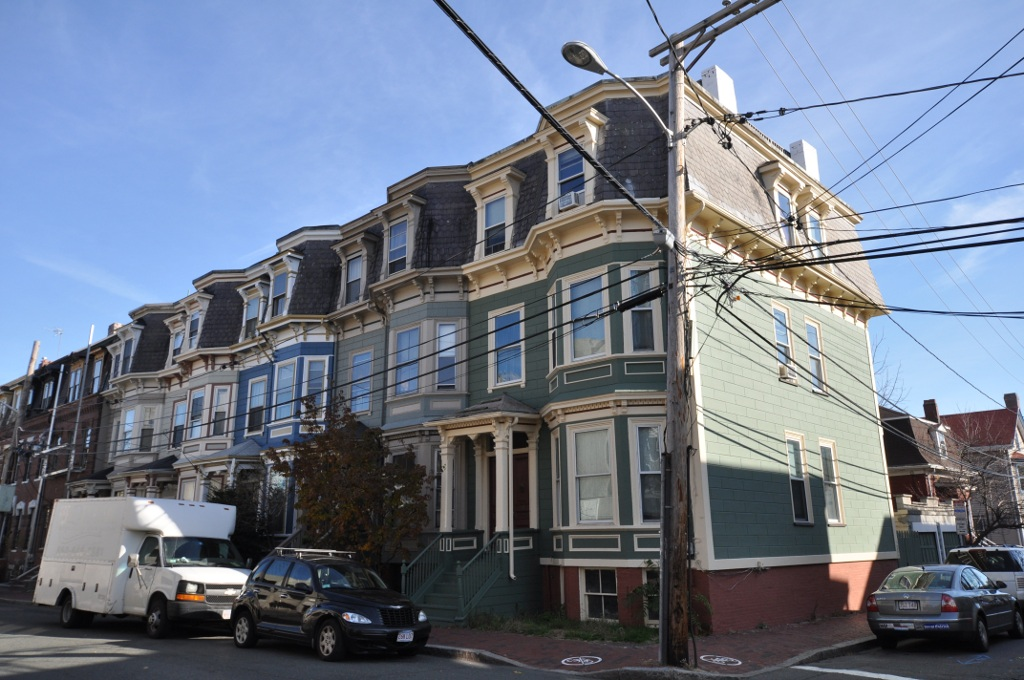

- Location within Massachusetts Location within the United States
- Location: 40–48 Pearl St., Cambridge, Massachusetts
- Coordinates: 42°21′49.4″N 71°6′12.3″W
- Built: 1875
- Architectural style: Second Empire, Mansard
- MPS: Cambridge MRA
- NRHP reference No.: 82001982
- Added to NRHP: April 13, 1982

The Urban Rowhouse is an historic rowhouse 40–48 Pearl Street in Cambridge, Massachusetts. The rowhouse was constructed in a Second Empire/Mansard style in 1875, and is a contrasting example to the rowhouse on the adjacent block to providing further construction density in an urban setting. This rowhouse is of wood-frame construction, while the neighboring one is built of brick. The polygonal bays rise to the mansard roof, where the shape of the bay is continued, giving visual texture to the structure.

The company Ksplice, Inc. was headquartered at 48 Pearl Street from September 2010 until its acquisition by Oracle in July 2011.

The rowhouse was listed on the National Register of Historic Places in 1982.

== See also ==
- Urban Rowhouse (26–32 River Street, Cambridge, Massachusetts)
- Urban Rowhouse (30–38 Pearl Street, Cambridge, Massachusetts)
- National Register of Historic Places listings in Cambridge, Massachusetts
