= Urban Rowhouse (26–32 River Street, Cambridge, Massachusetts) =

- U.S. National Register of Historic Places
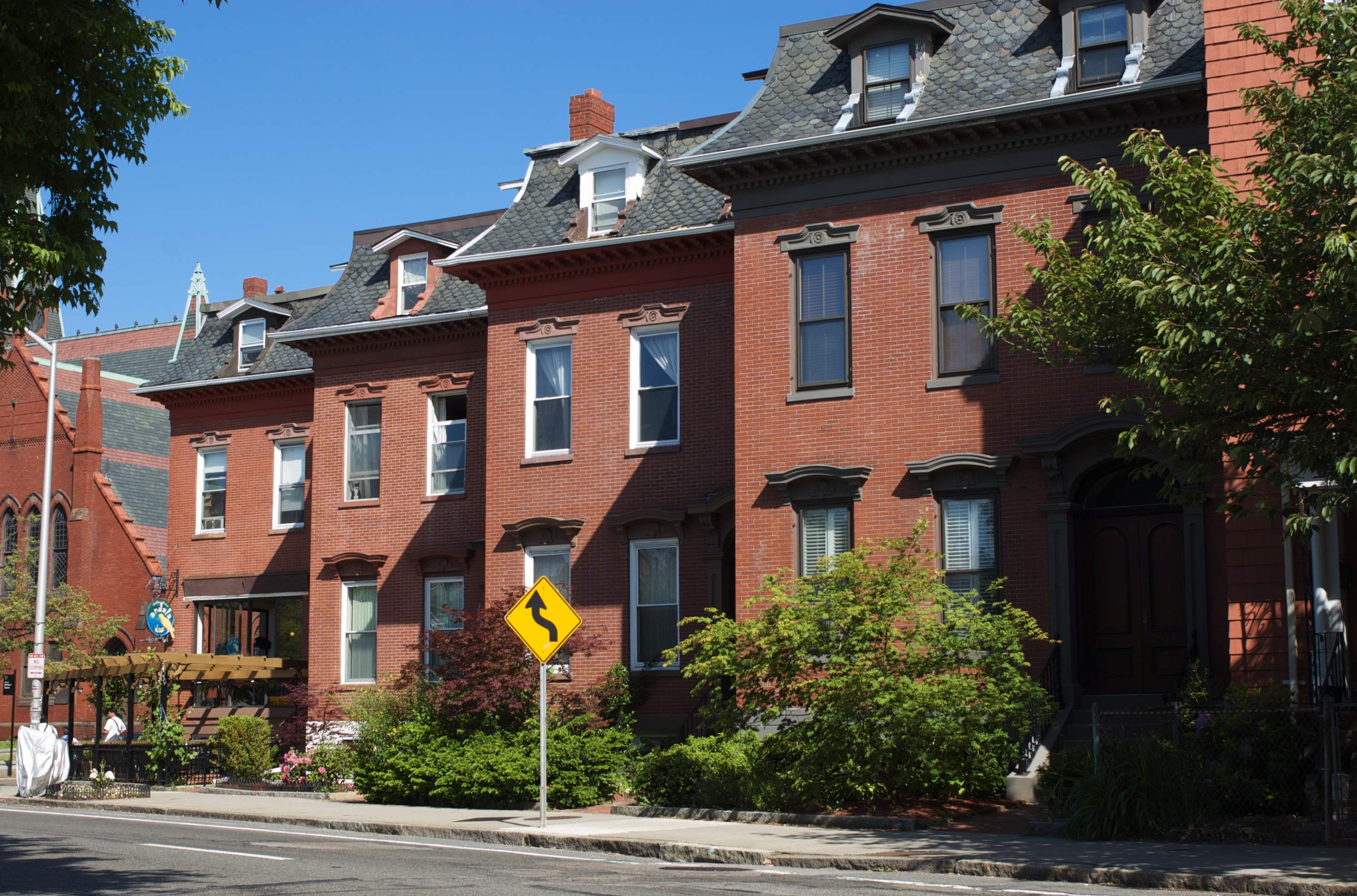

- Location within Massachusetts Location within the United States
- Location: 26–32 River St., Cambridge, Massachusetts
- Coordinates: 42°21′52.8″N 71°6′21.1″W
- Built: 1860
- Architectural style: Second Empire
- MPS: Cambridge MRA
- NRHP reference No.: 83000831
- Added to NRHP: June 30, 1983

The Urban Rowhouse is an historic residential rowhouse located at 26–32 River Street in Cambridge, Massachusetts. These rowhouses were built in 1860 by Frederick Clapp, and are among the earliest surviving examples of the type in the city. They feature a combination of brick and brownstone masonry, but also with some trim made out of wood that has been treated to appear like brownstone. They bear some resemblance to rowhouses built at the same time in Boston's South End.

The rowhouse was listed on the National Register of Historic Places in 1983.

== See also ==
- Urban Rowhouse (30–38 Pearl Street, Cambridge, Massachusetts)
- Urban Rowhouse (40–48 Pearl Street, Cambridge, Massachusetts)
- National Register of Historic Places listings in Cambridge, Massachusetts
