= Urban Rowhouse (30–38 Pearl Street, Cambridge, Massachusetts) =

- U.S. National Register of Historic Places
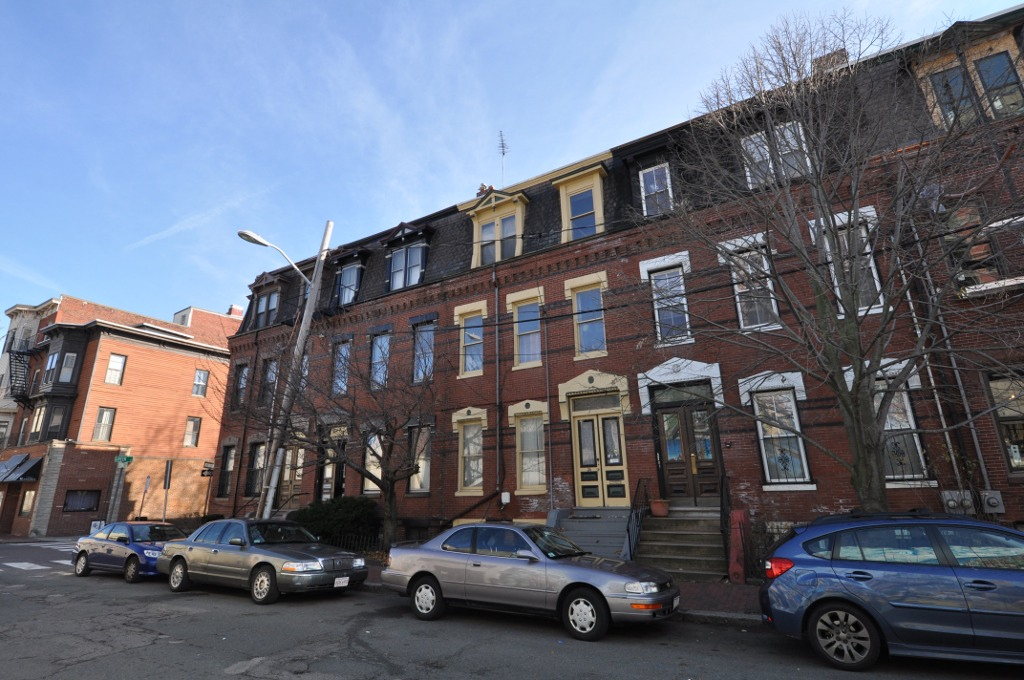

- Location within Massachusetts Location within the United States
- Location: 30–38 Pearl St., Cambridge, Massachusetts
- Coordinates: 42°21′50.2″N 71°6′11.4″W
- Built: 1874
- Architectural style: Ruskinian Gothic
- MPS: Cambridge MRA
- NRHP reference No.: 82001983
- Added to NRHP: April 13, 1982

The Urban Rowhouse is a historic rowhouse located at 30–38 Pearl Street in Cambridge, Massachusetts. Built in 1874, this was one of the earliest masonry rowhouses to be built in Cambridge. Stylistically, the three-story brick buildings are in a Ruskinian Gothic style, with horizontal bands of colored brick, hooded window lintels, a corbelled cornice, and a steeply pitched mansard roof with gabled dormers.

The rowhouse was listed on the National Register of Historic Places in 1982.

== See also ==
- Urban Rowhouse (40–48 Pearl Street, Cambridge, Massachusetts)
- Urban Rowhouse (26–32 River Street, Cambridge, Massachusetts)
- National Register of Historic Places listings in Cambridge, Massachusetts
