= Gray Gardens East and West Historic District =

Historic district in Massachusetts, United States

- U.S. National Register of Historic Places
- U.S. Historic district
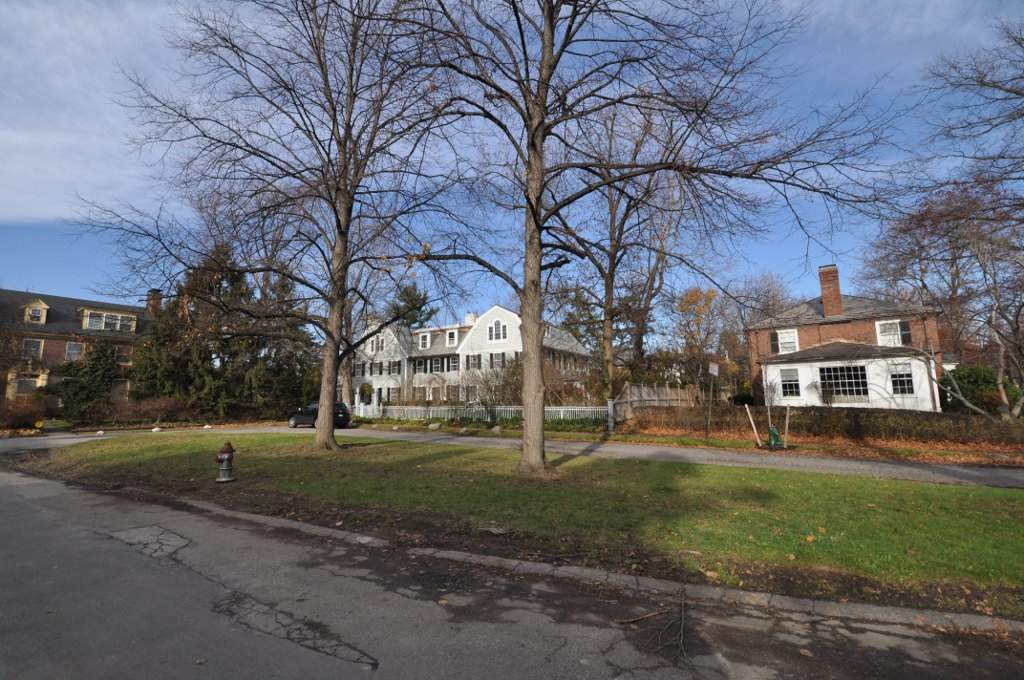
- The park at Gray Gardens West

- Location within Massachusetts Location within the United States
- Location: Cambridge, Massachusetts
- Coordinates: 42°23′1″N 71°7′43″W
- Architect: Putnam & Cox; Et al.
- Architectural style: Colonial Revival, Tudor Revival, Other
- MPS: Cambridge MRA
- NRHP reference No.: 86001283
- Added to NRHP: May 19, 1986

The Gray Gardens East and West Historic District is a historic district encompassing an early 20th century residential subdivision in Cambridge, Massachusetts. The subdivision includes all of the properties on Gray Gardens (East and West), as well as the adjacent 91 Garden Street and 60 Raymond Street. The subdivision was created by a group of interested individuals who sought to control development of one of the last estates in the area to be developed. They subdivided the land themselves, and imposed architectural restrictions on what could be built. Most of the houses were built between 1922 and 1930 and are neo-Georgian in style; the principal exception is the Hall Tavern, a Federal style tavern built in the 1790s and moved to the area from Duxbury, Massachusetts. The other unusual house is at 16 Gray Gardens East; it is a Tudor Revival house.

The district was listed on the National Register of Historic Places in 1986.

== See also ==
- National Register of Historic Places listings in Cambridge, Massachusetts
