= Hall Tavern =

- U.S. National Register of Historic Places
- U.S. Historic district – Contributing property
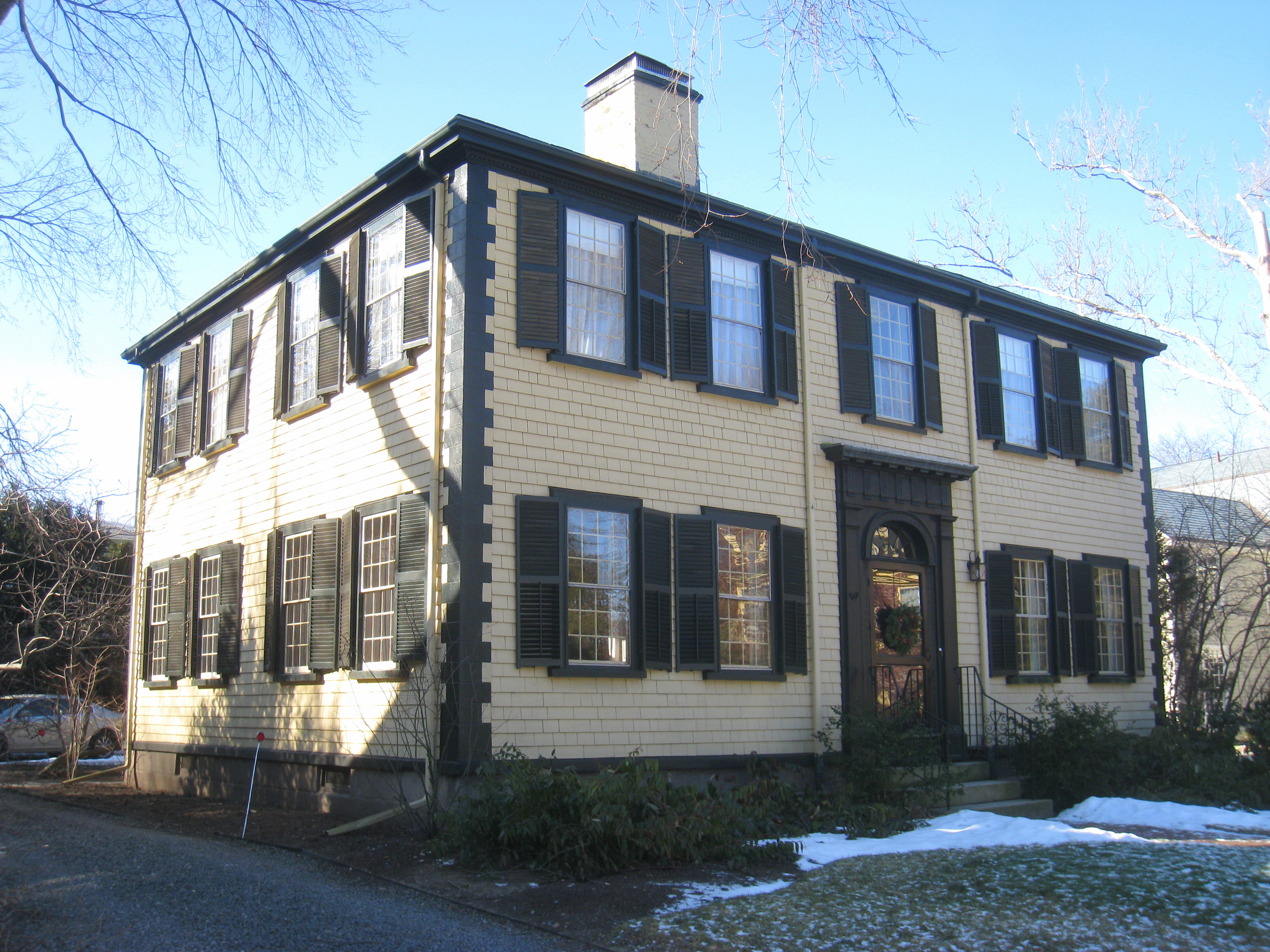

- Location within Massachusetts Location within the United States
- Location: Cambridge, Massachusetts
- Coordinates: 42°22′59.1″N 71°7′45.8″W
- Built: 1790
- Architectural style: Georgian, Federal
- Part of: Gray Gardens East and West Historic District (ID86001283)
- MPS: Cambridge MRA
- NRHP reference No.: 83000806

Significant dates
- Added to NRHP: June 30, 1983
- Designated CP: May 19, 1986

Hall Tavern is an historic tavern at 20 Gray Gardens West Street in Cambridge, Massachusetts. Now converted to residential use, this two story Federal style wood-frame building was built in sometime in the late 1790s in Duxbury, Massachusetts, and was moved to this location in 1930. The building is one of a number that were moved in order to preserve them in the early decades of the 20th century, and it is now one of the centerpieces of the Gray Gardens subdivision.

The building was listed on the National Register of Historic Places in 1983.

== See also ==
- National Register of Historic Places listings in Cambridge, Massachusetts
