= Community Art Center (Massachusetts) =

Arts institution in Cambridge, Massachusetts

The Community Art Center is an arts institution in Cambridge, Massachusetts. It was founded in 1937 in the neighborhood Newtowne Court. The art center services youth from ages 5 to 19 in programs that revolve around the arts.

== History ==
The Community Art Center was founded in 1937 in Cambridge, Massachusetts. It was first in the Newtowne Court housing development block in 1942, which had just been recently completed. In 1996, students from the art center founded the first Do It Your Own Damn Self film festival. It is the oldest youth-led film festival in the United States, although it does accept international submissions. The art center moved into a building across the street from Newtowne Court in 1999.
