= Cortex Innovation Community =

Innovation district in Saint Louis, Missouri, US

- Founded: 2002
- Founder: Washington University in St. Louis; BJC HealthCare; UMSL; Saint Louis University; Missouri Botanical Garden
- Type: Tax-exempt 501(c)3 Non-profit
- Purpose: Land use, land development, redevelopment, placemaking, marketing, startups, financing and fundraising.
- Location: Central West End, St. Louis
- Coordinates: 38°38′05″N 90°15′04″W
- Region served: St. Louis, Missouri, United States
- Members: 22 directors
- Key people: June McAllister Fowler, Board Chair, Sam Fiorello, President and CEO, William Henry Danforth, John Dubinsky
- Employees: 18
- Website: cortexstl.org
- Formerly called: Cortex West Redevelopment Corporation

Cortex Innovation Community, Cortex Innovation District, or Cortex is an innovation district in the Midtown neighborhood of St. Louis, Missouri. A 200-acre hub for technology and biological science research, development, and commercialization, Cortex is a main location for the city's technology startup companies. It is near Washington University School of Medicine, Saint Louis University, and Barnes-Jewish Hospital.

Cortex officials say their master plan calls for $2.3 billion of construction, producing more than 4.5 million square feet of mixed-use development to house 13,000 jobs in technology.

Cortex 3.0, a $170 million expansion, was completed in fall 2018.

== History ==
In 1998, William Henry Danforth, former chancellor of Washington University in St. Louis, sought to help the region build upon its strengths in medicine and plant sciences. He formed the Coalition for Plant and Life Sciences, now known as BioSTL, which led to the creation of the Donald Danforth Plant Science Center.

Danforth and John Dubinsky, CEO of financial consulting firm Westmoreland Associates and the eventual chairman of the Cortex board, went to Cambridge, Massachusetts, to study Kendall Square, a noted innovation district, to see how the concept could be used in St. Louis.

The idea was to create a district where companies could have access to talent, new technology, labs, and intellectual property.

The Midtown neighborhood was selected because the founding institutions are nearby and millennials wanted to live and work in the nearby urban areas.

In 2002, Cortex was founded as a 501(c) 3 tax-exempt organization by Washington University in St. Louis, BJC HealthCare (BJC), University of Missouri – St. Louis (UMSL), Saint Louis University, and the Missouri Botanical Garden. These founders contributed a total of $29 million to buy land and serve as collateral for loans: Washington University, $15 million; BJC and SLU, $5 million apiece; and UMSL, $4 million.

The Cortex West Redevelopment Corporation was classified by the city under Missouri statute Chapter 353 as a master developer of the district. St. Louis Mayor Francis Slay allowed Cortex to redevelop the area broadly in the "public interest" by issuing tax abatements and using eminent domain.

Cortex hired CEO Dennis Lower, who executed a plan called Cortex 2.0 and converted the district from strictly bioscience to an open mixed-used district and added support for startup technology companies.

In summer 2014, Square, the payments company set up by St. Louis natives Jim McKelvey and Jack Dorsey, opened offices at Cortex 4240.

In 2015, an Ikea store opened in Cortex.

In 2018, Microsoft opened its first Midwest headquarters at Cortex 4220.

In fall 2018, Venture Cafe Innovation Hall, 23 City Blocks Hospitality Group's restaurant and cafe, opened at Cortex 4220.

In June 2018, AON announced it would move 200 employees to the 4220 building.

In March 2020, Washington University School of Medicine announced the construction of a new $616 million, 11-story, 609,000-square-foot neuroscience research building to sit at the eastern edge of the Medical Campus in the Cortex Innovation Community. Construction was to be finished in 2023.

One of the primary companies building Cortex is Wexford, which had as of 2018 developed three properties and a total of 536,903 square feet.

== Facts ==
- In 2016, Cortex was credited drawing $500 million of investment and supporting 3,800 technology jobs.
- The MetroLink light-rail station added an infill Cortex station.
- Over 370 companies are based in Cortex.
- 4220 is a $53 million building that houses Microsoft and Innovation Hall, a 13,800-square-foot space based upon Venture Café’s District Hall in Boston.
- A $25 million hotel with 129 rooms.
- Phase one of a five-level parking garage started in fall 2018 for $14.7 million.
- Esri expanded its presence in St. Louis at Cortex to serve the National Geospatial-Intelligence Agency, which completing its Next NGA West campus.

== Innovation centers ==
=== CET St. Louis ===
The Center for Emerging Technologies (CET) is developing and establishing next-generation biomedical science and other advanced technology companies.

=== BioGenerator ===
BioGenerator discovers technologies and services with potential with an academic, research, or entrepreneur to make a company.

In 2018, BioGenerator officials announced they will anchor the new Cortex biotech building.

=== CIC St. Louis ===
Cambridge Innovation Center provides services for startups and companies including innovation spaces and coworking. CIC supports innovation in public relations, law, education, technology and life sciences.

=== Venture Cafe St. Louis ===
Venture Café St. Louis is a nonprofit hosting community-focused events and programs that support early-stage entrepreneurs.

=== COLLAB ===
In May 2019, Washington University in St. Louis and Saint Louis University launched the COLLAB at Cortex. The universities intend to use the 7,700-square-foot suite for various joint and separate projects, including training students in cybersecurity, entrepreneurship, and other high-demand fields. COLLAB is also intended to forge deals with industry to turn research discoveries into products; find or train technology workers; and pursue geospatial research, data science, and health informatics.

== See also ==
- Cambridge Innovation Center
- Venture Café
