= Hack/reduce =

U.S. non-profit organization

Coordinates: 42°21′58″N 71°5′2″W

hack/reduce
- Founded: 2012
- Type: 501(c)(3)
- Purpose: Big Data
- Location: Cambridge, Massachusetts
- Website: www.hackreduce.org

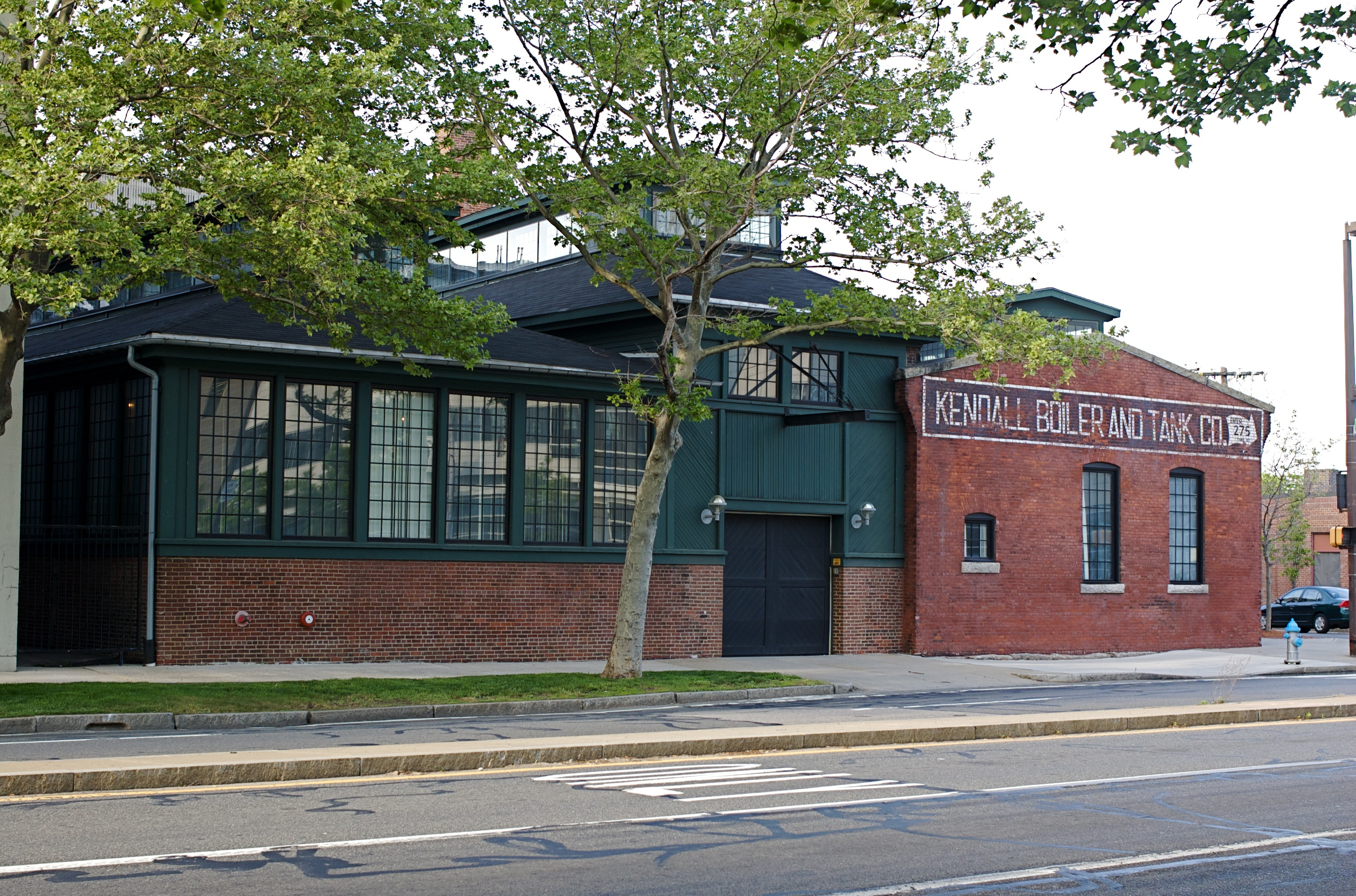
The Kendall Boiler and Tank Company building where hack/reduce is housed

hack/reduce is a 501(c)(3) non-profit created to cultivate a community of big data experts in the Boston area. It is located in the historic Kendall Boiler and Tank Company building in Kendall Square in Cambridge, Massachusetts.

It was founded by serial entrepreneurs Christopher P. Lynch and Frederic Lalonde in May 2012. At its founding, hack/reduce raised more than $500,000 from local venture capital firms and Samuel Madden. It has partnerships with MIT, CSAIL, Bentley University. and Harvard. Sponsors include Microsoft, IBM, GoGrid, Massachusetts Technology Collaborative, Dell, Atlas Venture, Bessemer Venture Partners, Hopper, Bright Spark Ventures, Google, and others.

In June 2012, Massachusetts Governor Deval Patrick announced the Massachusetts Big Data Initiative which comprised corporate, academic, and government programs as well as a $50,000 grant and the state's support for hack/reduce.
