= Venture Café =

Nonprofit organization

- Type: Nonprofit
- Industry: Technology, Startups
- Founded: 2009; 17 years ago
- Founders: Tim Rowe, Carrie Stalder
- Headquarters: Boston, Massachusetts, U.S.
- Areas served: 11 cities
- Key people: Tim Rowe
- Products: Workspace for startups; Small businesses; Freelancers and entrepreneurs
- Brands: Venture Café; Venture Café Global; Innovation Hall; District Hall
- Services: Shared workspaces and related services for entrepreneurs

Venture Café is a nonprofit organization that hosts community events and programs that support early-stage entrepreneurs.

As of May 2020, there are 11 independently managed Venture Cafés, located in Boston, St. Louis, Missouri; Miami; Winston-Salem, North Carolina; Providence, Rhode Island; Tokyo, Japan; Rotterdam, The Netherlands; Warsaw, Poland; Bilbao, Spain; and Sydney, Australia. As of 2019, there were plans to open Venture Cafés in some 40 more cities.

The flagship event of Venture Café is the Thursday Gathering, a weekly meeting for new and experienced entrepreneurs to exchange ideas and support. The event usually includes several free educational sessions to teach entrepreneurs to how to start and run a business. Participants can also hold informal discussions of creative and speculative ideas and look for collaborators, co-founders, mentors, or investors.

== History ==
The Venture Café was conceived as a restaurant in the Cambridge Innovation Center in Boston, Massachusetts. The idea failed to attract investment, so the founders changed it to a gathering space for the entrepreneurial community, based on the book Venture Café by Teresa Esser. Venture Café Kendall launched in 2009.

In 2014, Venture Café expanded to the Cortex Innovation Community in St. Louis, Missouri, to bring together the emerging startup community. The success of the St. Louis location prompted the launch of Venture Cafés in other cities and ultimately the creation of Venture Café Global Institute, a public benefit corporation based in St. Louis and Boston.

In 2018, as part of St. Louis Cortex District's new 4220 Duncan building anchored by Microsoft, Venture Cafe launched Innovation Hall in St. Louis based upon Boston's District Hall.

In 2018, St. Louis launched EdHub to support and bring together innovators to increase youth access to education. EdHub STL is inspired by the Forward Through Ferguson report, which calls for an innovation education hub to address the region's most entrenched educational issues.

Venture Café Foundation in Boston runs the Roxbury Innovation Center. Like EdHub, it brings together innovators in education including students, parents, administration, and teachers to help solve inequities in education and introduce youth to entrepreneurship and STEAM activities.

In September 2021, Venture Café St. Louis cancelled its events and made no public statements.

On September 13, 2021, Venture Café St. Louis board chair Whitney Masching released a statement stating, "Seven years later, it is time to close this chapter. Effective immediately, the VCSTL programming you know is on pause — but this isn’t the end."

In May 2025, Venture Café launched in the UK in London with other locations in Manchester, and Edinburgh.

== See also ==
- Co-working
