= Kendall Boiler and Tank Company =

- Kendall Boiler and Tank Company Building
- U.S. Historic district – Contributing property
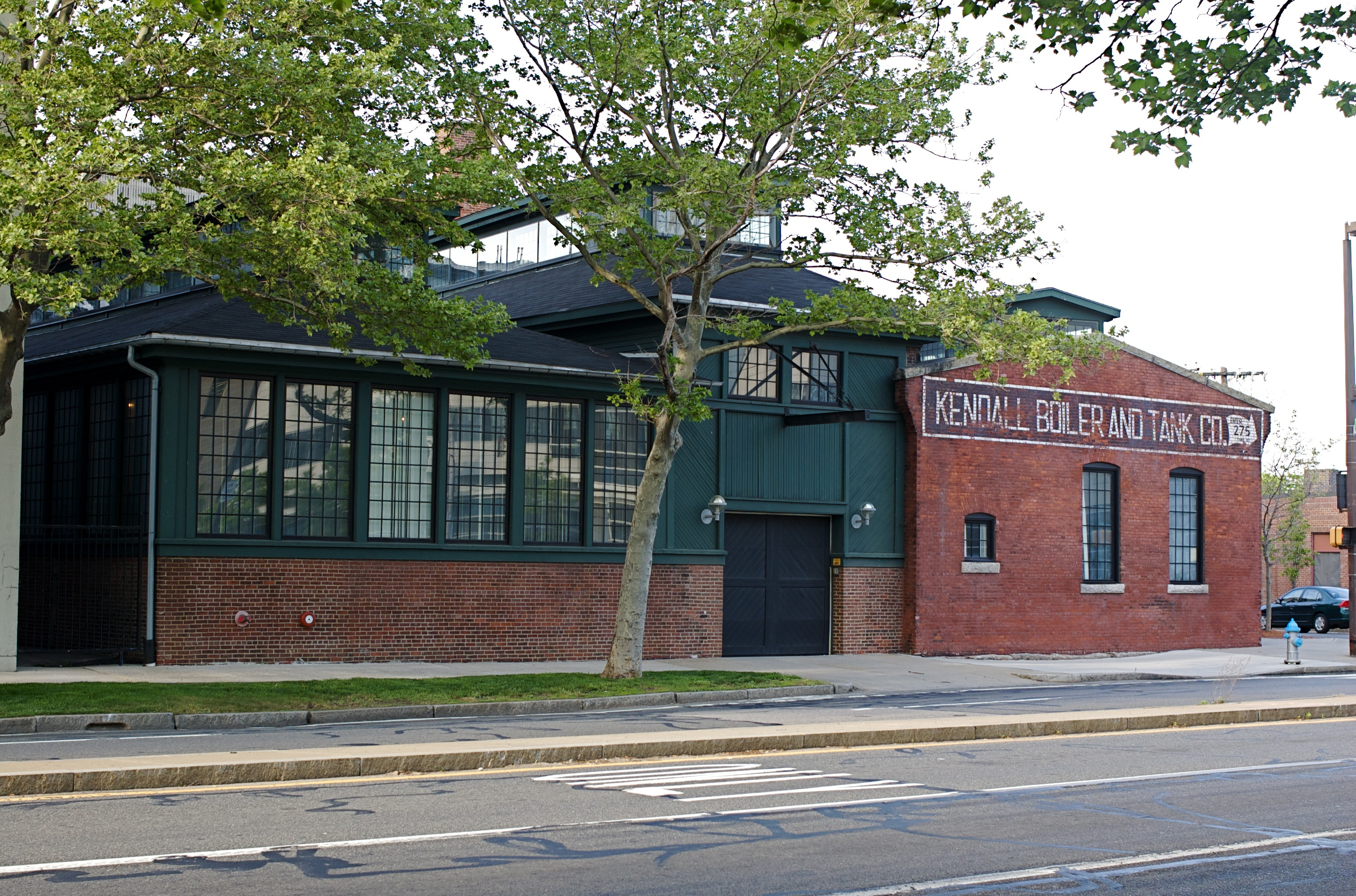
- The Kendall Boiler and Tank Company Building is part of the larger Blake and Knowles Steam Pump Company National Register District.

- Location within Massachusetts Location within the United States
- Location: 275 Third Street, Cambridge, Massachusetts
- Coordinates: 42°21′58″N 71°5′2″W
- Part of: Blake and Knowles Steam Pump Company National Register District (ID97000561)
- Added to NRHP: June 13, 1997

Kendall Boiler and Tank Company Building is a one-story commercial edifice located on 275 Third Street in Kendall Square, Cambridge, Massachusetts. The brick building was formerly owned by the Kendall Boiler and Tank Company and is part of the Blake and Knowles Steam Pump Company National Register District, on the National Register of Historic Places.

In 1880, Mr. Edward Kendall founded the company to manufacture steam boilers. Kendall Boiler and Tank Company relocated to its present home in Chelmsford, MA in the 20th century.

The building was restored by Pfeufer Richardson Architects to meet ADA standards for accessibility. There is 8,000 square feet of office space and an underground parking garage. In 2000, the building received a Cambridge Historical Commission Preservation Award.

The building was used by the Church of Jesus Christ of Latter-day Saints (LDS Church) until they moved to their new East Cambridge church building, in 2010. In 2012 hack/reduce, a nonprofit Big Data workspace founded by Christopher P. Lynch of Atlas Ventures and Frederic Lalonde of Hopper, opened its doors.
