= Christopher P. Lynch =

American Venture Capitalist and entrepreneur

- Born: April 22, 1963 (age 63)
- Education: Suffolk University (1986), Bentley University McCallum Graduate School of Business (1991)
- Occupation: Venture capitalist

Christopher P. Lynch (born April 22, 1963) is an American venture capitalist. He invested in sqrrl, DataRobot, Threat Stack, Nutonian and Hadapt. He co-founded hack/reduce, a Boston-based Big Data incubator in May 2012. Lynch was a founding member of ArrowPoint communications and Acopia Networks where he was CEO. Additionally, he was CEO at Vertica System.

== Early life ==
Christopher P. Lynch was born in Yonkers, New York, to Paul and Nora Lynch. The family of five children soon returned to the Boston area where father Paul had roots. He graduated from Arlington High School in Massachusetts in 1981 and attended Suffolk University where he earned his bachelor's degree in business management in 1986. He earned his MBA from the McCallum Graduate School of Business in 1991. In May 2011, Lynch received an honorary doctorate of commercial science degree from Bentley University and addressed the graduates during the commencement ceremony.

== Career ==
=== Early career ===
Lynch began his technology sales and marketing career by joining Digital Equipment Corporation (DEC) in 1987 as a sales representative. From there he joined Wellfleet Communications led by another DEC alum, Paul Severino (which merged with SynOptics to form Bay Networks in 1994). Lynch then went to Prominent as Vice President of sales, purchased by Lucent in 1997, where he held the position of V.P. of North American Data Sales.

=== Arrowpoint ===
In 1997, Lynch left Lucent to continue his relationship with mentor Paul Ferri of Matrix Partners (investor in Prominent & Arrowpoint) to join ArrowPoint Communications with Chin-Cheng Wu. ArrowPoint provided Web switches and Web network services (WebNS) software allowing customers to optimize the use of the web for e-commerce and content delivery. Lynch was Vice President of Worldwide Sales, Marketing and Support through its initial public offering in 2000. Later that year the company sold to Cisco for Cisco Systems for $5.7 billion, the second largest purchase in Cisco's history. After the acquisition Lynch was Vice President of Worldwide Content Delivery for Cisco.

=== Vertica ===
At Vertica Lynch was president and CEO, leading the company from a late-stage startup to the top ranked Big Data company globally. In 2011 Vertica was acquired by Hewlett Packard in a deal whose terms were undisclosed. At HP Lynch was the Senior Vice President and General Manager of Hewlett-Packard's Database Business Unit, a role he took after HP's acquisition of Vertica Systems in February 2011, where he was CEO.

=== Boards and recent ventures ===
Lynch is as an advisor and mentor to many Boston area entrepreneurs and is on the board of RayV Networks (acquired by Yahoo!), docTrackr (acquired by Intralinks), and H-Streaming (acquired by Adello). He was Chairman of Azuki Systems, co-founded by ArrowPoint and Acopia founder Chin-Cheng Wu (acquired by Ericsson in 2014). He is personally invested in a number of early-stage startup companies, including PowerInBox and Kinvey. Lynch is a noted supporter of St. Baldrick's Foundation, a non-profit dedicated to pediatric cancer research.

=== Hack Reduce ===
In 2012, Lynch co-founded Hack Reduce along with Frederic Lalonde as a way to cultivate a community of Big Data experts in Boston. It is located in the historic Kendall Boiler and Tank Company building at 275 Third Street in Kendall Square in Cambridge, Massachusetts. Hack Reduce was founded in conjunction with the Commonwealth of Massachusetts’ Big Data Initiative, which is a financial contributor.
