= Cambridge Innovation Center =

Real estate community serving several communities of entrepreneurs

Cambridge Innovation Center (CIC)

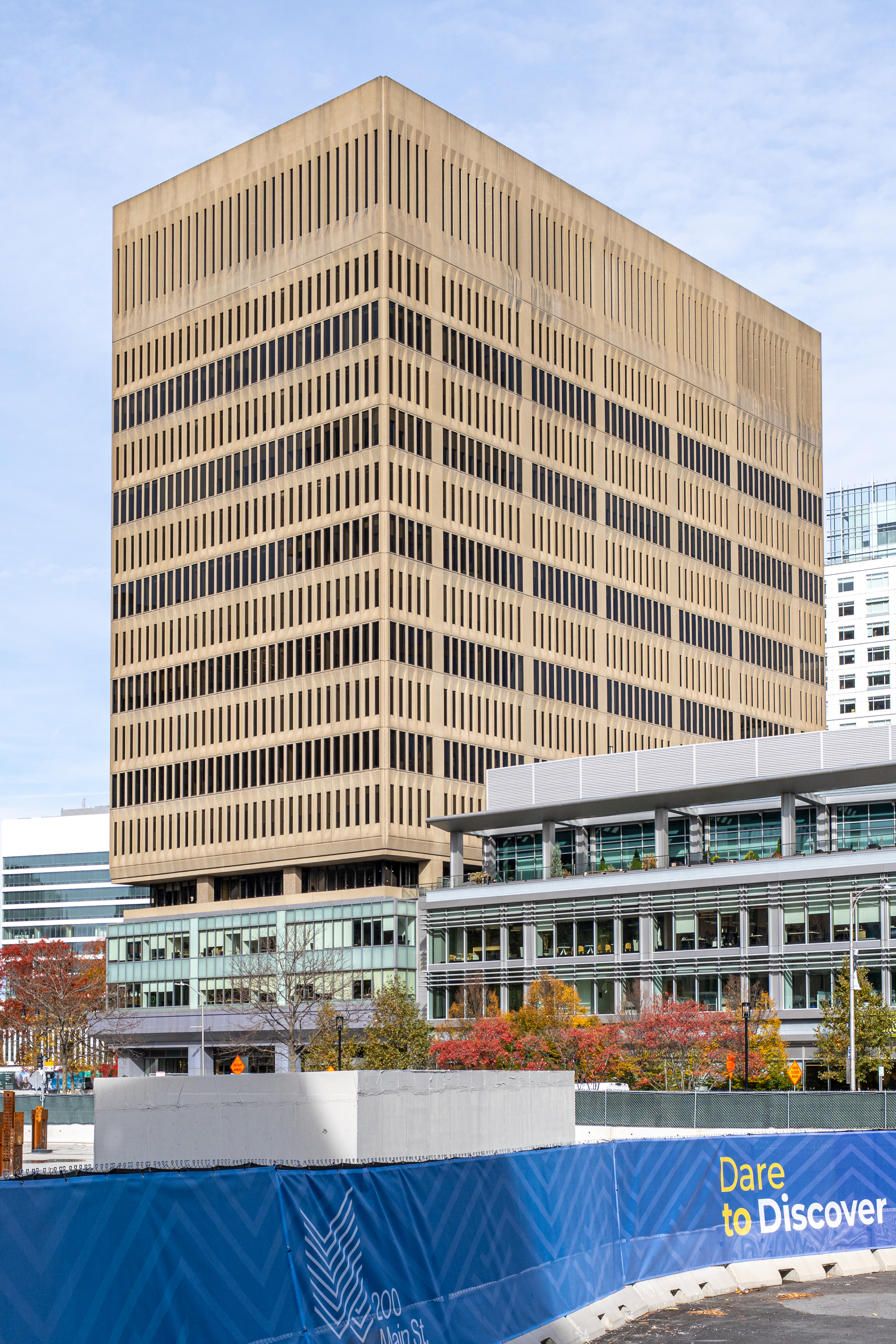
- Headquarters in One Broadway
- Company type: Private
- Industry: co-working
- Founded: 1999; 27 years ago
- Founders: Timothy Rowe; Andrew Olmsted
- Headquarters: Cambridge, Massachusetts, U.S.
- Number of locations: 10 cities
- Key people: Timothy Rowe, CEO
- Products: startup/ community co-working
- Brands: CIC, LabCentral
- Services: Shared workspace for entrepreneurs
- Number of employees: 100+
- Website: cic.com

Cambridge Innovation Center (CIC) is an American community of entrepreneurs. The company was founded in 1999 by Massachusetts Institute of Technology (MIT) graduates Timothy Rowe and Andrew Olmsted. Its campuses are a mix of startups, corporate innovation spin-outs, and venture capital funds. CIC houses innovation globalization programs for more than a dozen governments, including Canada, China, Germany, Japan, and the Netherlands.

== History ==
CIC was founded in 1999 in 2,700 square feet (250 m^{2}) at 238 Main St in Kendall Square (also the home of the MIT Treasurer's office). In April 2001 it grew to 18,000 square feet (1,700 m^{2}) across the street at One Broadway. An unusual office design garnered its new office the Honor Award for Design Excellence from the Boston Society of Architects for 2000. It continued to grow, doubling in size twice by 2004, reaching 71,000 square feet (6,600 m^{2}) and 75 companies.

In December 2006, a major transformer fire in an NSTAR electrical vault in the basement of One Broadway led to the building and the CIC being closed for 5 weeks. The 150 companies located in the building at that time, including Google, had to be relocated on an emergency basis in space provided by MIT.

In August 2008, CIC housed 170 companies, and was recognized in a Boston Globe feature article. Massachusetts Governor Deval Patrick visited Cambridge Innovation Center in January 2009. As of July 2013, CIC had grown to over 500 companies.

In May 2013, CIC announced its first expansion outside of Massachusetts. CIC St. Louis anticipates being able to house up to 100 companies when fully occupied.

CIC is the first innovation center to have opened. Since its creation, private companies and local governments are promoting the creation of their own version of an innovation center. Innovation centers can be local development strategies through public-private partnerships for cities to foster innovation district.

In February 2018, the CIC signed a lease for 90,000 square feet (8,400 m^{2}) in the heart of Kendall Square at the corner of Broadway and Main. The lease comes with a large street facing video screen and the location is a short distance from the Kendall/MIT station Red Line subway.

In March 2018, CIC closed a $58 million round of funding from HB Reavis.

In 2020, CIC founded CIC Health, a subsidiary that manages COVID-19 testing sites. In 2021, the Commonwealth of Massachusetts contracted CIC Health to run mass vaccination centers at Gillette Stadium, Fenway Park, and later the Hynes Convention Center. CIC Health manages the scheduling and logistics for its testing and vaccines sites, while procedures are performed by contracted physicians and hospital workers.

Also in 2020, CIC opened two new campuses in Tokyo and Warsaw.

== Notable companies at CIC ==
- Google set up its New England headquarters in CIC in 2005. The first person to move in was Android co-founder Rich Miner. It was later moved down the street after it reached 175 employees.
- Maven Technologies, the company that would later become a Yahoo subsidiary and the kernel of its operations in Cambridge, was started at CIC.
- Great Point Energy, while based at Cambridge Innovation Center in 2007, raised $103M for its coal gasification technology. It was at the time one of the largest investments in the history of cleantech.
- HubSpot was a tenant of CIC from 2006 to 2010.

== Trivia ==
In 2008, Cambridge Innovation Center operated one of the early bikeshare programs in the Boston area.
