= Tim Rowe =

American tech entrepreneur

- Born: Cambridge, Massachusetts, United States
- Education: Amherst College; MIT; MIT Sloan School of Management
- Known for: Coworking, Venture Café, Cambridge Innovation Center (CIC), New Atlantic Ventures
- Website: @rowe at twitter/X

Timothy Rowe is an American technology entrepreneur. He is the founder and Executive Chair of Cambridge Innovation Center (CIC) as well as the founder of Venture Café. He also serves as a partner of New Atlantic Ventures, Founding Chair of LabCentral, and Founding Chair of MassRobotics.

Previously, Rowe has served as a lecturer at the MIT Sloan School of Management, a manager with the Boston Consulting Group, and an analyst with the Mitsubishi Research Institute.

== Cambridge Innovation Center ==
Rowe contacted MIT for their smallest space to lease, eventually signing a lease for a 3,000-square-foot office. The space was too large for just him and his wife, so they invited friends to stay with them. Rowe, his wife Amy, and his friends began starting companies and using the offices for their new companies. It was during this time that Rowe came up with the idea to create a shared work environment, which became the Cambridge Innovation Center (CIC).

When Joi Ito came to Boston to run the MIT Media Lab, Rowe brought Joi to CIC with Rich Miner. In 2014, he was named Entrepreneur of the Year.

CIC is the "largest space for startups." CIC currently has shared innovation spaces with the Cambridge Space, and spaces in Boston, Massachusetts; St. Louis, Missouri; Providence, Rhode Island; Rotterdam, Netherlands; Philadelphia, Pennsylvania; Tokyo, Japan, and Warsaw, Poland.

== Personal life ==
Rowe speaks Spanish and Japanese fluently and holds an MBA from MIT’s Sloan School of Management and a BA from Amherst College.

He was a major supporter of the Kendall Square Association, a nonprofit group with the goal to improve the Kendall Square area through innovation. In 2012, he helped create their "Walk of Fame" to display the contributions of their innovators. The group installed plaques on the sidewalks modeled after the stars along Hollywood Boulevard.

== See also ==
- Cambridge Innovation Center (CIC)
- Venture Cafe
