= Cambridge Center =

Development project in Cambridge, Massachusetts

Coordinates: 42°21′46.8″N 71°5′11.8″W

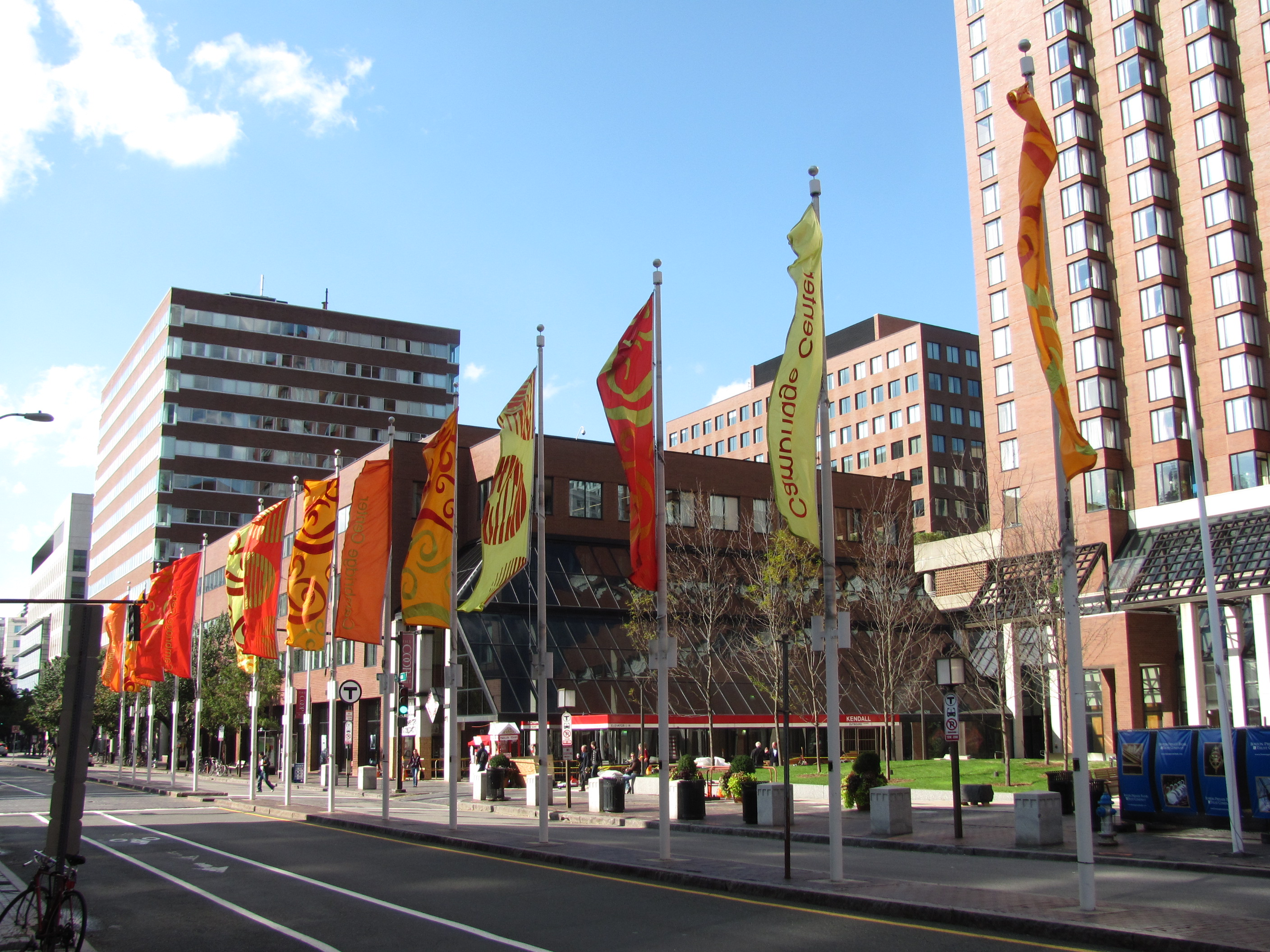
Cambridge Center in October 2011

Cambridge Center is a development complex located in the Kendall Square section of Cambridge, Massachusetts, along Broadway and Main streets. The project was started in 1979 and continues in progress to this day. The Kendall Square Urban Renewal Plan (KSURP) includes an "urban mixed-use project on a 24-acre site", directly across the Charles River from downtown Boston. Boston Properties is the developer.

== History ==
The project was launched in 1979, with construction on the first building of a 13-story, 243,426 square-foot office building at Five Cambridge Center beginning in 1980. The Five Cambridge Center was fully leased by 1982.

Some of the buildings have MIT designations and are partially used for academic and research purposes. Alphabet Inc has its Cambridge office split across three buildings in Cambridge Center.

On September 16, 2011, an initiative by the City of Cambridge was unveiled called the Entrepreneur Walk of Fame. The walk of fame seeks to highlight individuals that have made contributions to innovation in the global business community.

As of 2015, the redevelopment plan includes 4 million square feet of new development across 19 buildings, including office space, biotechnology laboratory space, hotel and retail space, and 400,000 square feet of housing. Approximately 150,000 square feet of space is open to the public via parks and plazas.
