= Kendall Hotel =

Historic hotel in Massachusetts, U.S.

The Kendall Hotel
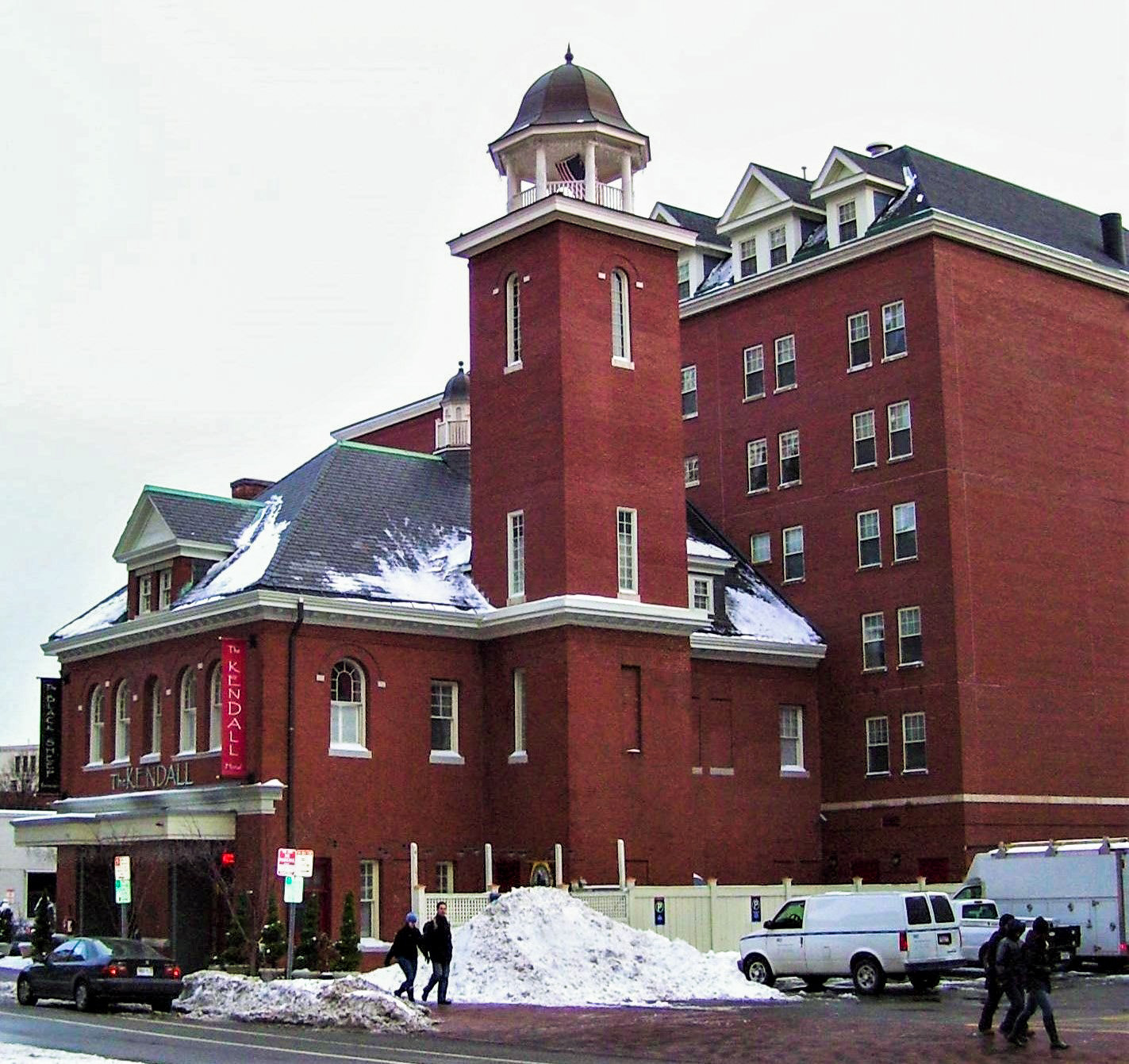
- Hotel in 2010

- Location within Massachusetts Location within the United States

General information
- Coordinates: 42.3622°N 71.0873°W
- Opened: 2002

The Kendall Hotel, or The Kendall Hotel, is a boutique hotel on Main St. in the Kendall Square area of Cambridge, Massachusetts. It repurposed a firehouse built in 1895: it was once the Engine 7 Firehouse.

The Daily Telegraph's online review terms it a "gorgeous Victorian firehouse turned boutique hotel near buzzy Kendall Square" and asserts that its "Black Sheep restaurant is a gem".

The building was originally designed to support horse-drawn fire-fighting equipment. It served in fire protection from 1895 to 1993, its role replaced by a modern fire station in Central Square. The building was renovated starting in 2000. Renovation involved moving the original three-story firehouse closer to the street, adding a seven-story tower behind, and restoring two cupolas. After opening in 2002, it was expanded in 2007 with the addition of a second seven-story tower.

The hotel is a member of the Historic Hotels of America. (Note: In 2020 the hotel's webpages claimed that it is listed on the National Register of Historic Places (Kendall Hotel: About), but that claim appears to be incorrect. It is not individually listed in National Register of Historic Places listings in Cambridge, Massachusetts, nor as a contributing building in any historic district. Claims in travel websites appear to echo the hotel's own claim but seem not supported by National Park Service official mentions anywhere. It is not claimed to be NRHP-listed in any page of the Historic Hotels of America, which is a program of the National Trust for Historic Preservation. The false claim of NRHP listing is continued in Kendall Hotel's webpage in 2021 and has been repeated in The Telegraph in 2021.)

The owners have been honored by the Cambridge Historical Commission for the quality of their historic preservation efforts.

The Washington Post in 2017 included "Kendall Hotel at the Engine 7 Firehouse" in a list of 23 American "hotel retrofits", as "part of a trend toward historic adaptive reuse that has travelers overnighting in former department stores, textile mills, an auto assembly plant and even a 19th-century jail.".
