= Innovation district =

Zones in cities where entrepreneurs, startups and business incubators are attracted

Innovation districts are land developments for research and development (R&D) institutions, companies, and others that develop integrated strategies and solutions to develop thriving innovation ecosystems–areas that attract entrepreneurs, startups, and business incubators. Unlike science parks, innovation districts are generally physically compact, leverage density and high levels of accessibility, and provide a mix of uses including housing, office, and neighborhood-serving amenities. Districts signify the collapse back of innovation into cities and is increasingly used as a way to revitalize the economies of cities and their broader regions. As of 2019, there are more than 100 districts worldwide.

Since the 1950s and Stanford Industrial Park, entrepreneurial clustering had followed the Silicon Valley model of suburban corridors with sprawling research centers and campuses. In the late 1990s, Internet startups and creative companies started to cluster in downtown neighborhoods such as Silicon Alley (New York), Mission District (San Francisco), Seaport (Boston), Shoreditch, (London), and Silicon Sentier (Paris), because of their central locations, abundant urban amenities, and low rents. In the early 2000s, European and American cities began to mimic these areas through policy and planning by dedicating zones exclusively for the purpose of clustering entrepreneurs, startups, business accelerators and incubators. These spaces are easily accessible via public transportation, wired for public Wi-Fi, support mixed-use development, and nurture collaboration and knowledge-sharing.

== Stanford Industrial Park, Palo Alto, California ==
In 1951, Stanford Industrial Park was authorized by Stanford University and the City of Palo Alto, on 209 acres. In 1953, Varian Associates was the first tenant.

== Research Triangle Park, Raleigh-Durham, North Carolina ==
In 1959, Raleigh-Durham area's research park, Research Triangle Park was created. It presently covers 7,000 acres of land and 22.5 million square feet. Over 190 companies and 50,000 employees work in the Research Triangle Park and it hosts some of the largest biotech and pharmaceutical companies in the world, including GlaxoSmithKline and Cisco Systems.

Leaders of the Research Triangle Park in 2012 unveiled a master plan to reinvent the physical location of the park. Believing that the current layout was not conducive to collaboration, competition and knowledge-sharing, they recognized the need to redevelop office into an innovation district-like layout. The 50-year master plan will be centered on a 100-acre site in the middle of the present-day Research Triangle Park in order to promote high-density workspace and living. A new commuter rail system will also be developed in order to connect the Park to downtown Durham and Raleigh.

== Kendall Square, Cambridge, Massachusetts ==
The Kendall Square innovation district is anchored by surrounding Massachusetts Institute of Technology in Cambridge, Massachusetts and in close proximity to Harvard University, Massachusetts General Hospital and other world-leading research institutions. In the 1950s, MIT began deploying university-owned land to innovative private sector companies and developing partnerships with local organizations to support the commercialization of ideas stemming from the university. In the ensuing decades, life sciences and pharmaceutical companies began to cluster in the area. Today, Kendall Square houses over 150 biotech, IT, technology and clean energy companies. Firms such as Google, Microsoft, Amgen, Biogen and Novartis have large offices in Kendall Square. Hundreds of startups have been formed and are headquartered in the Kendall Square area as well. Significant real estate development has occurred recently, with approximately 1,000 new housing units built in the area since 2005.

== El Poblenou, Barcelona ==
Barcelona created an innovation district, the 22@Barcelona Project. In 2000, the initiative began to redevelop the industrial El Poblenou neighborhood in the Sant Martí district of the city. Long the city's manufacturing heart and a production center for textiles, food, wine, construction products and metal structures, El Poblenou saw some 1,300 factories close between 1963 and 1990 and was largely abandoned.

The 1992 Summer Olympics in Barcelona gathered thought-leaders in the city to begin crafting a plan to redevelop the El Poblenou neighborhood. Over the next 7 years, transportation initiatives were created to connect the then-isolated space to more vibrant parts of Barcelona. In 1999, this project was completed with the opening of the Avinguda Diagonal (Diagonal Avenue), which connected El Poblenou to the downtown area's business district.

In July 2000, a unanimous vote by the Barcelona City Council approved the Amended Metropolitan Master Plan for the redevelopment of the El Poblenou area. The project was named the 22@ Project, representing a play on the previous urban classification name, "22a", that designated the exclusive use of an area for industrial production. According to the City Council, “Thus, 22@ Project is a permit to recover the productive vocation of the old economic hub of the city of Barcelona in order to create a new model of urban space according to the needs of the current knowledge-based society.”

== South Lake Union, Seattle ==
Seattle's South Lake Union neighborhood transformed in the late 2000s from a low-rise industrial complex into one of the most thriving innovation hubs in the United States. In the early to mid-20th century, South Lake Union was a prosperous manufacturing center for Washington's biggest industrial companies. Wood making, ship building and airplane manufacturing companies all were located in the area. However, South Lake Union experienced a significant decline in businesses and residents in the 1980s and 1990s. However, as a result of major development plans by Paul Allen's Vulcan Real Estate, the neighborhood has persuaded the area's leading companies and research centers to relocate to South Lake Union.

== Oxford Road Corridor, Manchester, UK ==
The Oxford Road Corridor innovation district is a square mile in the south of Manchester's city centre where two of the UK's largest universities, the University of Manchester and Manchester Metropolitan University, are based alongside Manchester University NHS Foundation Trust. These organisations oversee the area in a partnership incorporated in 2007 alongside Manchester City Council and Bruntwood.

In 2015, The Department for Business, Energy and Industrial Strategy (BEIS) invited consortia, formed around geographic and technological themes, to apply to be involved in the science and innovation audit (SIA) process. The Greater Manchester and East Cheshire SIA highlighted that 50% of the City Region's science and innovation assets were located in the Oxford Road Corridor. Recognising the region's ‘Core Strengths’ in Health Innovation and Advanced Materials, and ‘Fast Growth Opportunities’ focused on the future potential of Digital, Energy, and Industrial Biotechnology.

In the 2018 Manchester City Council adopted a Strategic Spatial Framework for the Oxford Road Corridor to guide future development and protect the area's unique innovation eco-system.

The Oxford Road Corridor is home to a wide concentration of public, private, academic, and clinical institutions, generating 20% of Manchester's GVA and providing 79,000 jobs. It is home to 50% of Manchester's life sciences businesses, 74,000 students including 16,220 international students, with 42% of all students studying STEM related disciplines. Property companies Bruntwood and Bruntwood SciTech have invested significantly into assets in the area, acquiring the Manchester Technology Centre in 2003 and developing Manchester Science Park, and Citylabs both of which have designated Life Sciences Enterprise Zone status, and Circle Square which is home to over 35 digital tech businesses including Hewlett Packard Enterprise, Northcoders, Blair Project and Tootoot.

== Cortex Innovation Community, St. Louis, Missouri ==
Cortex Innovation Community in St. Louis, Missouri, United States, is the largest innovation hub in the midwest region. It has generated 3,800 tech jobs in 14 years. Once it is completely built out, projections are for it to make $2 billion in development and make 13,000 jobs for the region.

== 195 District, Providence, Rhode Island ==
The 195 District in Providence, Rhode Island, United States, was created when Interstate 195 was relocated and 26-acres of land in downtown Providence were freed for development. Brown Medical School moved to the district from its original College Hill location in 2011, and numerous life science, tech, and sustainable energy companies have moved to the area including Johnson & Johnson, Ørsted (company), and Boskalis, as well as research facilities for nearby Rhode Island Hospital and Women & Infants Hospital. A 200,000 square foot laboratory building is currently in development, and Brown University is planning a 300,000 square foot life sciences research facility. A 7-acre park, a new bus rapid transit station, and the Michael S. Van Leesten Memorial Bridge were built in recent years to contribute to the public realm of the district.

== Innovation District, Detroit ==
The Detroit Innovation District is a cross-sector initiative dedicated to curbing the city's economic decline and population loss through the attraction of technology companies to Detroit's downtown and midtown area. In 2014, Mayor Mike Duggan established the Detroit Innovation District Advisory Committee with Nancy Schlichting, CEO of Henry Ford Health Systems, at the helm of the organization. The initiative dedicated 4.3 square miles of greater downtown Detroit to house small business incubators, train local aspiring entrepreneurs, and attract anchor institutions to the area. The area comprises only 3.1% of the city's land area, but already hosts 55% of the city's jobs and 11% of all companies in Detroit.

== High Tech Campus, Eindhoven, Netherlands ==
The High Tech Campus Eindhoven (HTCE) is located in Eindhoven, Netherlands. This campus was originally established by Philips, and was thus the breeding ground for many successful Philips products as well as a large number of hightech startups, some of which became leading OEMs themselves─such as ASML and NXP. In 2003 the campus was opened up to other companies, and in 2012 it was sold to a consortium of external investors. The result was a substantial growth in the number of hightech companies and other residents – both large and small. The HTCE has therefore been praised as one of the best locations in the world for developing hightech systems and solutions.

== proposed: Innovation District, Medellín, Colombia ==
The Innovation District of Medellín is a proposal for the transformation of the city: social, urban and economic, which seeks to convert the north of the city into an innovation ecosystem that concentrates citizens, entrepreneurs, companies and institutions within the knowledge economy, participate in joint projects and make Medellín a hub of Innovation in the World.

== City Innovation District, Glasgow, Scotland ==
The Glasgow City Innovation District (GCID) is located in Glasgow, Scotland. GCID is Scotland's global hub for entrepreneurship, innovation, and collaboration and is centred within Glasgow's thriving Merchant City. As Scotland's first innovation district it is home to innovative companies and organisations who locate to nurture and accelerate inclusive growth, improve productivity, and develop world-class talent, research, and technology within a vibrant ‘live, work, play and innovate’ environment. GCID develops, delivers, and supports a range of inclusive innovation-driven initiatives and programs including the Glasgow Tech Fest – Glasgow's first dedicated tech conference, the first Royal Academy of Engineering Enterprise Hub for Scotland, the first Climate Neutral District, Business Growth Programmes as well as the Inspire Partners’ Hub which supports Entrepreneurs and Spinouts from Strathclyde University which maximises collaboration, innovation, and impact success.

== Recent research ==
Many academic institutions and think tanks are analyzing the various models of innovation districts and their effects on economic growth and job creation.

Bruce Katz and Julie Wagner at the Brookings Institution, wrote “The Rise of Innovation Districts: A New Geography of Innovation in America.” In their research, Katz and Wagner describe the components of successful innovation districts; the economic and demographic trends leading to their rise; and describe a range of models that have emerged in city-regions around the world. Katz also dedicated a section to innovation districts in his book The Metropolitan Revolution: How Cities and Metros Are Fixing Our Broken Politics and Fragile Economy.

A research team at MIT’s Department of Urban Studies and Planning, led by Dennis Frenchman, identified discrete geographic clusters of creative industries, life sciences, and applied sciences within large-scale real estate development projects. Defined as “New Century City Developments,” these innovative clusters are “driven by inter-organization and cross-industry collaboration, open systems for R&D, and workers who have the aptitudes and skills required by the networked, knowledge economy.”

George Bugliarello of Polytechnic University in New York observed the emergence of “urban knowledge parks,” concluding that these urban parks develop around a knowledge institution in a city, provide public space or spaces for community activities, and possess high levels of density.”

Ed Glaeser, an urban economist at Harvard University, also supported the trends driving innovation districts, concluding that “employment growth is strongly predicted by smaller average establishment size, both across cities and across industries within cities.” Specifically, Glaeser studied the effect of a 10% increase in the number of firms per worker in a given city and concluded this was associated with a 9% increase in employment growth in the ensuing two decades.

The growing demand and need for deeper practice-oriented research led to the development of The Global Institute on Innovation Districts, an independent not-for-profit research organization. Research led by The Global Institute, further elaborates on this emerging geography in a growing body of research including: “The Evolution of Innovation Districts: The New Geography of Global Innovation,” “Tearing Down Real Walls: A Place-Based Approach to University-Industry Collaboration,” and “Positioning Innovation Districts as a Road to Recovery – Five Insights for National and State Governments.”

=== Proven Models ===
Bruce Katz and Julie Wagner identify in their 2014 report three primary models in how innovation districts are created:

1. Anchor plus: This model is characterized by the revitalization efforts / redevelopment centering on a leading institution in a city. The institution itself plays a vital role in redeveloping the surrounding real estate into innovation-friendly locations and attracting entrepreneurs, startups and talent to the area. The most frequently cited examples of this model include Cambridge, Massachusetts’ Kendall Square and St. Louis’ Cortex district. MIT has significantly shaped the development of Kendall Square and Washington University in St. Louis has led the redevelopment of the Cortex district in St. Louis.
2. Re-imagined urban areas: Followers of this model focus the efforts of building an innovation district around degraded real estate, most likely in the outskirts of the city. Re-imagined urban area innovation districts are typically located along historic waterfronts that once served as thriving manufacturing hubs in the 20th century. It is common for significant investments in public transportation to accompany this model in order to reconnect this once-thriving part of a city to downtown residents. Examples of this model include Boston's Innovation District (redeveloped South Boston Waterfront), Barcelona's 22@Project (redeveloped Poblenou neighborhood) and Seattle's South Lake Union.
3. Urbanized science park: This model is characterized by re-imagining suburban or exurban areas into less sprawling, isolated geographies. Examples of this model include Raleigh-Durham's Research Triangle Park, which was one of the preeminent research corridors in the 1980s and 1990s. However, in November 2012, leaders of Research Triangle Park unveiled a master plan to reinvent the area to attract more nearby living and working, and promote physical spaces that encourage “random collisions” and open innovation.

=== Gentrification ===
Among the criticisms of innovation districts, one of the most recurrent is the issue of gentrification leading the Brookings Institution to write an article around the question “Does innovation equal gentrification?”. In her analysis of Philadelphia—a city with one of the oldest innovation districts in the United States—Vey reached this conclusion: “In Philadelphia, as in most cities, it is not gentrification that is widening the gap between the people and communities who are succeeding in this economy and those who are not: It's the rise in concentrated poverty.”

The fear of displacement, which is dominating the debate about gentrification, is hindering the discussion about genuine progressive approaches to distribute the benefits of urban redevelopment strategies. Place-based, knowledge-based urban development strategies, such as of an innovation district, can, in contrast to traditional capital-led urban renewal programs, bring additional benefits, such as enhanced innovation capacities and branding, to local stakeholders that can be more progressively distributed.

In Chattanooga's Innovation District, the strategies that have been implemented to limit the negative externalities of the knowledge economy can be regrouped into three main categories: socio-economic, urban, and housing. The socio-economic strategy refers to the promotion of entrepreneurship to underrepresented groups in the entrepreneurial community through programs, such as mentoring, coaching, seed capital access, and entrepreneurial assistance. The socio-economic strategy also involves digital training and STEAM education as to bridge the digital and technological divides within the city's residents, through programs targeting young children, low-income communities, unemployed and underemployed persons. The urban strategy refers to a plan of action to make the downtown as a place interesting and welcoming to everyone, through placemaking, the creation of park and parkways, and events. More importantly, it aims to consciously shape programs to give to the most underrepresented groups a sense of ownership of the innovation district. The housing strategy refers to the creation of affordable housing. In the case of Chattanooga, it is pursued through property tax breaks to real-estate developers and through a not-for-profit organization, Chattanooga Neighborhood Enterprise (CNE).

In the end, the ability for districts to advance innovation and equitable growth indeed requires deep intentionality and leadership. The Global Network of Innovation Districts—a group of 23 districts worldwide—is discussing how best to organize and design the types of integrated strategies need to advance equitable growth in the face of growing disparities. As innovation districts evolve, in other word, they are developing a deeper, more impact-focused value proposition, which includes growing the skills and talent of local communities.
