= Galaxy: Earth Sphere =

Fountain and sculpture by Joe Davis

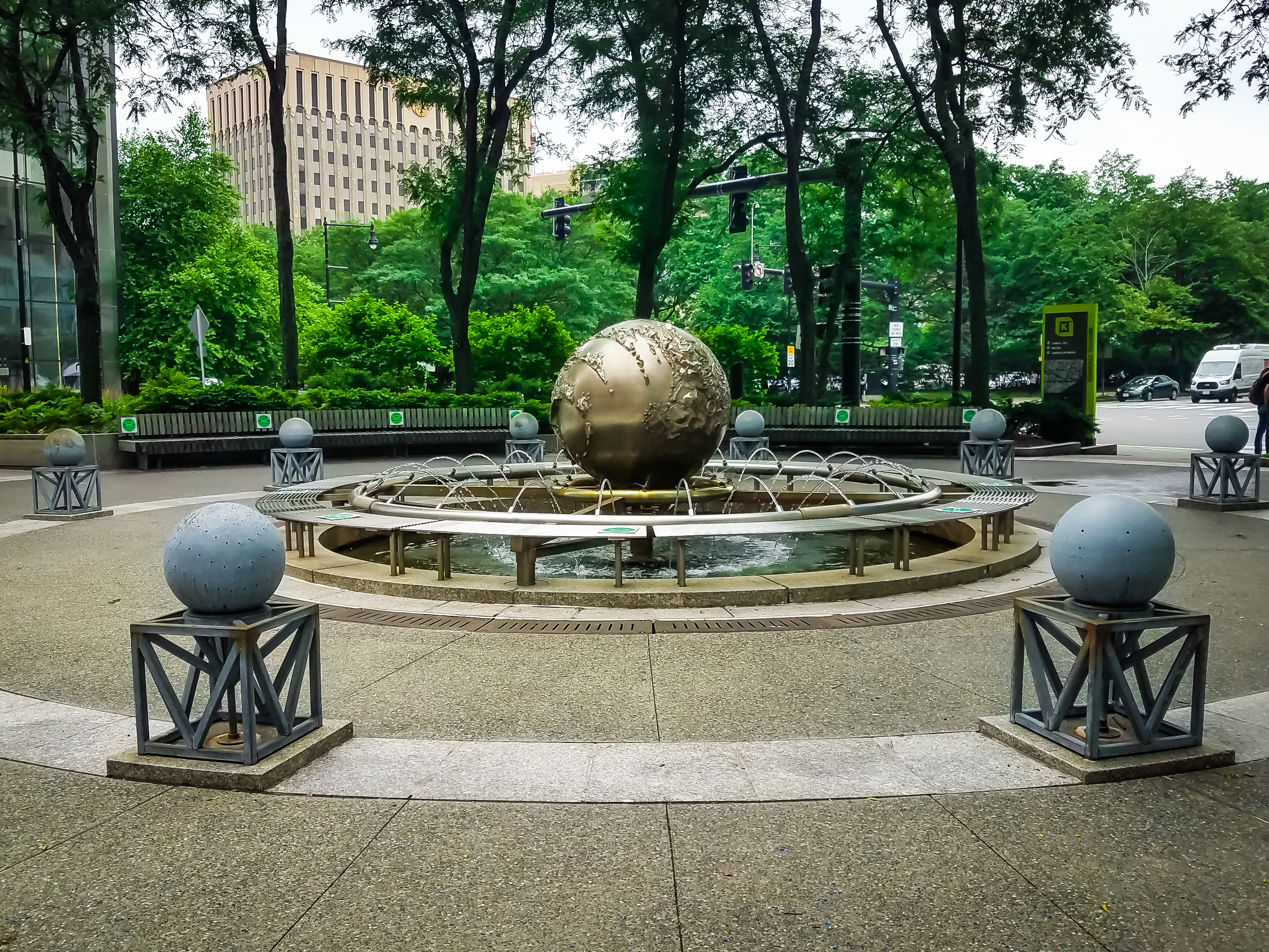
- The sculpture in Kendall Square, 2010
- Artist: Joe Davis
- Year: 1989
- Location: Cambridge, Massachusetts, U.S.; 42.362378°N 71.084398°W

Galaxy: Earth Sphere is a 1989 fountain and sculpture by Joe Davis, installed in Kendall Square, Cambridge, Massachusetts, United States. The artwork was designed to emit streams of low-temperature steam from time to time, but the pipes sourcing this emission have been broken for some time.
