= Kendall Band =

Three-part musical sculpture by Paul Matisse

Coordinates: 42°21′44″N 71°05′10″W

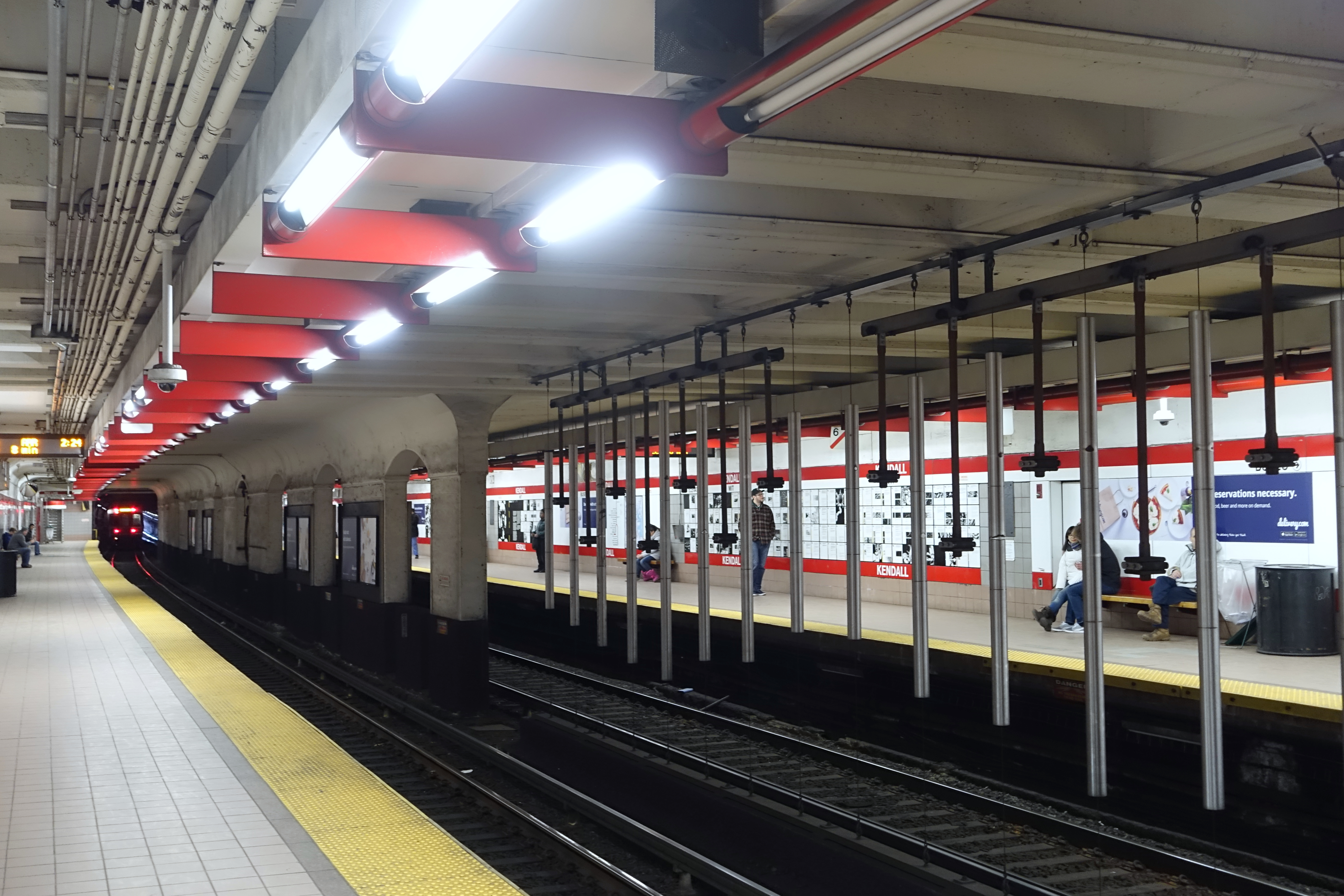
- Pythagoras is the largest component of the Kendall Band
- Artist: Paul Matisse
- Year: 1986–1988
- Type: Interactive sound sculpture (aluminum, steel, teak)
- Location: Kendall/MIT station; Cambridge, Massachusetts
- Owner: MBTA

The Kendall Band is a three-part musical sculpture created between 1986 and 1988 by Paul Matisse, who is the grandson of French artist Henri Matisse and stepson of surrealist artist Marcel Duchamp. It is installed between the inbound and outbound tracks of the Massachusetts Bay Transportation Authority's Kendall Station located in Cambridge, Massachusetts near the MIT campus. As of 2007, the art work was seen by an estimated 12,518 riders on an average weekday. It had originally cost $90,000 to construct.

The three parts of the interactive work are called Pythagoras, Kepler, and Galileo, and are all controlled by levers located on the subway platforms.

== Sculpture ==
The Kendall Band is an interactive sound sculpture located in Cambridge, Massachusetts, in Kendall Station. The work consists of three interactive instruments that are played using handles located on both the inbound and outbound subway platform walls. Each instrument was designed so that it could be played from either platform of the subway station. Aluminum, steel, and teak were all used in the construction of the musical instruments, with the teak being used for the heads of the hammers.

The ensemble was created by Paul Matisse, who is the grandson of Henri Matisse and stepson of Marcel Duchamp. Matisse won the commission in 1981 to create a sculpture for Kendall Station, as part of an effort to beautify the Red Line and its stations. This effort was known as the "Arts on the Line" program, and was "the first program in the nation to put works of art in public transportation systems." The work was not installed until 1987 due to station reconstruction.

Due to fears of the art work being vandalized, Matisse decided to place the sculpture between the inbound and outbound tracks of the station before even deciding on what to create. He said "It had a third rail on one side, a third rail on the other side, and I thought it would be safe." Matisse is known for other interactive sound sculptures, such as his Musical Fence (1980), which was originally installed in Cambridge, Massachusetts, and now is located at the DeCordova Museum and Sculpture Park in Lincoln, Massachusetts.

=== Pythagoras ===
The Pythagoras section of the Kendall Band is named for the philosopher, mathematician, and scientist Pythagoras of Samos, who is best known for the Pythagorean theorem. The sculpture consists of 16 4-inch-diameter (100 mm), 1/4-inch-thick (6.4 mm) aluminum tubular bells, all tuned in the key of B minor. The longer bells create low pitches, while the shorter bells create higher pitches in the scale. When a handle on the wall of the subway platform is pulled, teak-headed hammers swing back and forth between the bells, striking them and creating the musical notes. Due to asymmetrical slits located at the nodal points in the bells, each chime's note plays a slight vibrato.

There are actually two identical, completely separate and independent musical instruments comprising Pythagoras. One can be operated from a handle located on the inbound subway platform, and the other can be played simultaneously from a handle on the outbound side. The hammers are not directly coupled to the handles, to prevent them from striking the chimes too violently. Instead, the handles must be rhythmically moved back and forth at an appropriate frequency, depending on the physical phenomenon of mechanical resonance to build up enough energy to strike the chimes. Which chimes are sounded when depends in a complex manner on the recent history of handle movement. Although the detailed mathematical analysis of motions is quite complex, most visitors quickly and intuitively figure out how to operate the sculpture without any written instructions.

=== Kepler ===
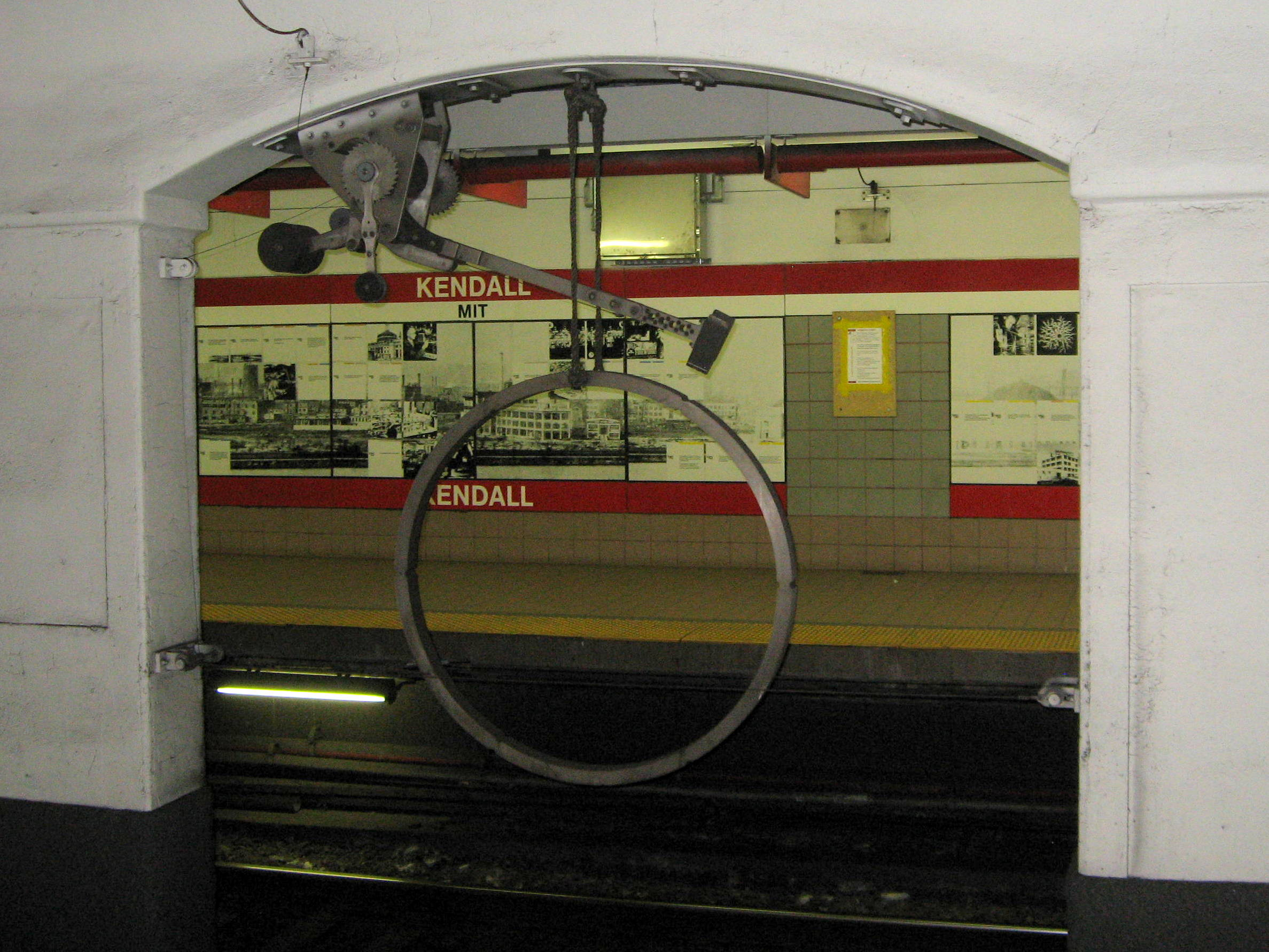
Kepler

The Kepler section is named for Johannes Kepler, a 17th-century German mathematician, astronomer, and astrologer. This instrument features a 125-pound (57 kg), 55-inch (1,400 mm), metal ring that plays an F♯ when struck. This note creates a harmonic perfect fifth with the tones sounded by Pythagoras. The ring plays this note when a handle on either subway platform is manipulated, which in turn ratchets a hammer upward until it falls and strikes the ring. After the ring is struck, it will continue to hum for five minutes.

=== Galileo ===
The Galileo instrument is a large metal sheet the size of a barn door, and is named for Italian physicist, mathematician, astronomer, and philosopher Galileo Galilei. The flat panel of steel works like a thunder sheet. When a handle on either station platform is moved, the sheet shakes and creates a low rumbling sound, similar to the sound of thunder, or the sound trains make when rolling through the station.

== Installation and repairs ==
Paul Matisse was the only artist commissioned for the initial "Arts on the Line" program who created an artwork with moving parts. Almost immediately after the Kendall Band was installed, it broke. The sculpture began to fail so quickly that the Pythagoras instrument stopped working before the other two could even be completely installed. Matisse later commented that, "You’d probably have to say it was folly of me to press ahead and present them with something that had moving parts...(but)...I figured it was going to be all right."

Although Matisse's contract specified that the MBTA would pay for repairs, the agency did not pay him and he did repairs for free. Matisse would post temporary signs in place of the instrument handles on the walls of the station whenever repair work was taking place on the Kendall Band. Responses which were scrawled in the margins by passengers ranged from "If you spent my tax $ on this, then may you DIE SLOWLY!!" to “If you spent tax dollars on this, may you live long + happily." Other comments included “Great to do while stoned!", “Thank you for making me forget the horrors of this day", and “Try to get a tapered connection from the first vertical to the second on this side and an oversized second vertical linkage with perhaps an internal shock absorber".

Over time, repairs and additions to the sculpture were completed that made the work more resilient. One of the more-important modifications added a set of mechanical clutches hidden behind the handles of the instruments, which disengage "when someone yanks too hard or too fast".

No repair or upgrade work could be performed until 1:30am each night, which is when the MBTA stops running trains. Matisse himself had to personally repair the sculpture whenever it broke, and he was not able to find any organization or corporation that was willing to take over the upkeep of the Band. Because of this, Matisse eventually abandoned the work after roughly 20 years of maintenance. He later stated, “I just kept it going, and then at one point I decided that I was just going to have to let it go out on its own... Sort of like one’s kids. The time comes."

== Decline into disrepair ==
A one-time $10,000 fix was paid for by the MBTA in 2007, but the transit agency then stated that it could not fund any future repairs. All further repairs made to the sculpture had to be carried out and paid for by Matisse out of his own pocket. In 2007, when the now 74-year-old Paul Matisse stopped patching up the Kendall Band, the sculpture quickly fell into disrepair. Out of the original six handles, four had been removed, and only Galileo was in a working state.

The only original engineering drawings for the Kendall Band were also lost in a hard-drive crash during this period, requiring documentation to be reconstructed from disassembly and direct measurement of components.

== Kendall Band Preservation Society ==
Over the years, the nearby Massachusetts Institute of Technology (MIT) has expanded into Kendall Square, as principal sponsor and collaborator in the burgeoning high-tech innovation district. In 2010, a group of MIT students were brought together to repair and conserve the Kendall Band. The idea for the group came from Seth G. Parker, a principal at a Massachusetts based energy consulting firm. He got in touch with the head of the Concerts Office in Music and Theater Arts at MIT, Clarise E. Snyder. She in turn contacted Paul Matisse and the MIT Department of Materials Science and Engineering, who recommended that instructor Michael J. Tarkanian be supervisor of the project to repair the sculpture.

About 20 students were gathered to work on the cataloging and repair of the instruments, with seven of them chosen to actually dismantle the work. The students dubbed themselves "The Kendall Band Preservation Society".

In April 2010, the Kendall Band Preservation Society started dismantling the Kendall Band. Richard A. Davey, then general manager of the MBTA, stopped in to speak to the students and wish them luck in repairing the artwork. The students taped up signs in the same fashion as Paul Matisse did when he repaired the Band, and comments were again scrawled in the margins. A student representative of the group said, “I think we will be able to get the instruments functional over the span of a few months, but our longer term goal is to complete [sic] refurbish and document each instrument. That will be a much longer project, on the order of years.”

As of May 2011, Pythagoras was restored to operation from the inbound platform, while work continued on the other two instruments.

Since then, the sculptures have again fallen into disrepair, and were being restored to operation as of February 2018. Tarkanian has handed over responsibility for maintenance to Steve Drasco, a physics instructor in the MIT Concourse educational group. As of November 2024, only the Pythagoras tubular chimes operated from the outbound platform were connected and functional.
