= Rheoscopic fluid =

Fluid in which currents are visualized

In fluid mechanics (specifically rheology), rheoscopic fluids are fluids whose internal currents are visible as it flows. Such fluids are effective in visualizing dynamic currents, such as convection and laminar flow. They are microscopic crystalline platelets such as mica, metallic flakes, or fish scales in suspension in a fluid such as water or glycol stearate.

When the fluid is put in motion, the suspended particles orient themselves with the local fluid shear. With appropriate illumination, the particle-filled fluid will reflect differing intensities of light.

A Kalliroscope is an art device/technique based on rheoscopic fluids (using crystalline guanine as the indicator particles) invented by artist Paul Matisse.

== See also ==
- Reynolds number
