= Kendall/MIT station =

Subway station in Cambridge, Massachusetts

Kendall
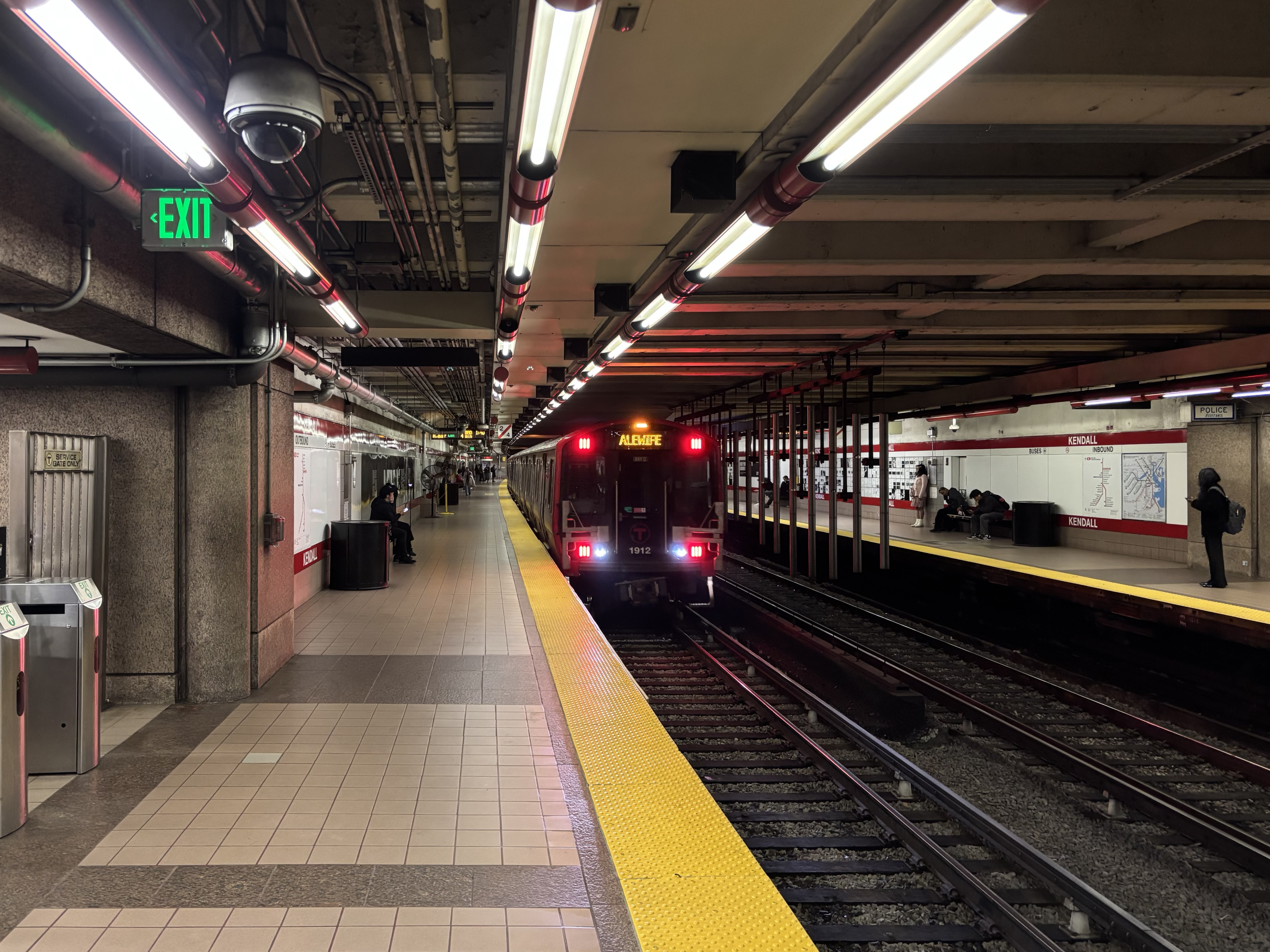
- A northbound train arriving at Kendall/MIT station in 2025

General information
- Location: Main Street at Broadway; Cambridge, Massachusetts
- Coordinates: 42.3624°N 71.0857°W
- Line: Cambridge Tunnel
- Platforms: 2 side platforms
- Tracks: 2
- Connections: MBTA bus: 64, 68, 85; EZRide

Construction
- Structure type: Underground
- Cycle facilities: 58 spaces
- Accessible: Yes

History
- Opened: March 23, 1912
- Former names: Kendall (1912–1982); Cambridge Center/MIT (1982–1985)

Passengers
- FY2019: 17,018 daily boardings

Services
Preceding station	MBTA	Following station
Central toward Alewife	Red Line	Charles/MGH toward Ashmont or Braintree
Planned services
Preceding station	MBTA	Following station
At Broadway station
Massachusetts Avenue toward West Station	Grand Junction Branch (proposed)	Medford/Gore Street toward North Station
Location

Kendall/MIT station (signed as Kendall) is an underground rapid transit station in Cambridge, Massachusetts. It is served by the MBTA Red Line. Located at the intersection of Main Street and Broadway, it is named for the primary areas it serves - the Kendall Square business district and the Massachusetts Institute of Technology (MIT). Opened in March 1912 as part of the original Cambridge subway, Kendall/MIT has two side platforms serving the line's two tracks. The Kendall Band, a public art installation of hand-operated musical sculptures, is located between the tracks in the station with controls located on the platforms. Kendall/MIT station is accessible. With 17,018 weekday boardings by a FY2019 count, Kendall/MIT has the fourth highest ridership among MBTA subway stations.

== Station design ==
Kendall/MIT station has two underground side platforms serving the two tracks of the Red Line, which runs approximately east–west under Main Street. The main headhouses are located midblock between Broadway and Ames Street, with smaller entrances further east near Broadway. The main headhouses have elevators for accessibility. The main inbound headhouse has two angled glass entrances and a pair of glass elevators, with an angular canopy supported on thin columns.

The station is served by three MBTA bus routes: 64, 68, and 85. The CT2 stops on Ames Street near Main Street, northwest of the station, while the other routes stop on Main Street adjacent to the main headhouses. The EZRide shuttle service between Cambridge, the CambridgeSide mall, Lechmere station and North Station, also stops on Ames Street.

=== Kendall Band ===
Between 1986 and 1988, artist Paul Matisse installed Kendall Band, an interactive musical sculpture, at Kendall/MIT. Located between the Red Line tracks at the station, it cost $90,000 to construct under the Arts on the Line program. It consists of three musical devices - Pythagoras, Kepler, and Galileo - controlled by levers located on both subway platforms. Although Matisse maintained it for several decades, it ultimately fell into disrepair. A group of MIT students began restoration in 2010, with Pythagoras rendered partially functional in May 2011.

== History ==
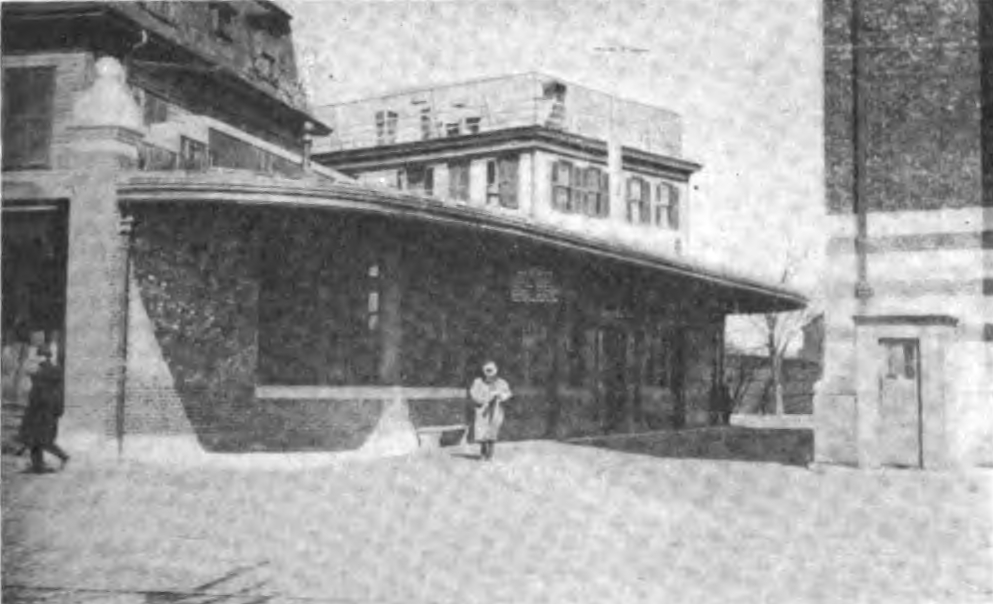
The outbound headhouse in 1912

The Cambridge subway opened from Park Street Under to Harvard on March 23, 1912, with intermediate stops at Central and Kendall. From the early 20th century through the 1970s, the MBTA operated a powerhouse above ground in Kendall Square, including rotary converters (also called cycloconverters) to transform incoming AC electrical power to 600 volts DC power fed to the third rail to run the subway. An old-fashioned cycloconverter consisted of an AC motor coupled to a huge, slowly rotating flywheel coupled to a DC generator, hence the name. Despite the development of compact low-maintenance semiconductor-based power rectifiers, the long-obsolete electromechanical technology still occupied prime real estate in the heart of Kendall Square. The MBTA powerhouse was demolished, and replaced with an office building located at the convergence of Broadway and Main Street.

=== Name changes and reconstructions ===
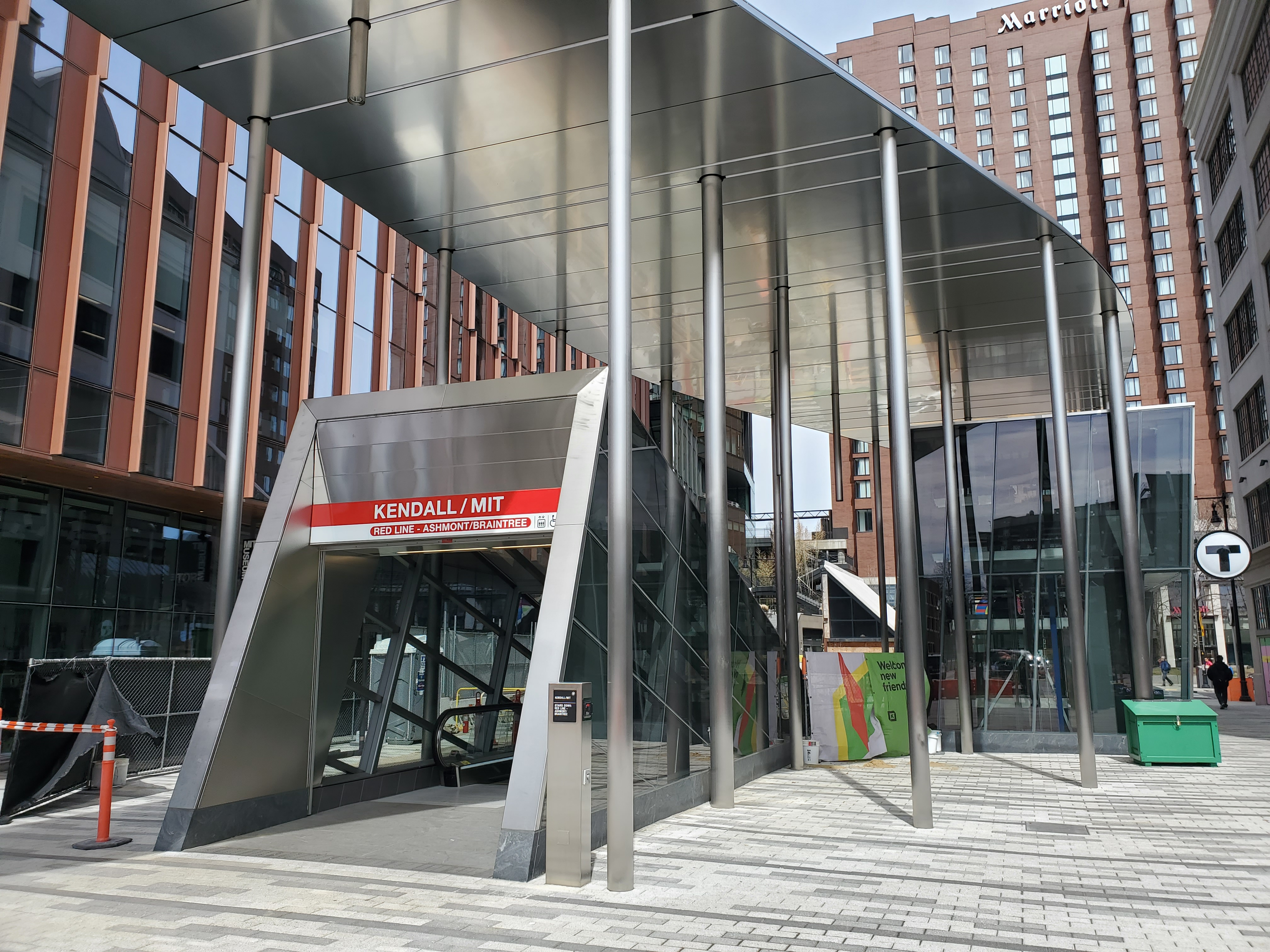
New inbound headhouses in April 2023

The MBTA renamed the station three times in a seven-year period. On August 7, 1978, the station was renamed as Kendall/MIT to indicate the nearby presence of the Massachusetts Institute of Technology. On December 2, 1982, Columbia station was renamed JFK/UMass, and Kendall/MIT was renamed as Cambridge Center/MIT after the adjacent Cambridge Center development, although most station signs were not changed. There were many complaints that the MBTA had suddenly changed the name without public input, and that the new name would be confused with the next Red Line station at Central Square. On June 26, 1985, the name was reverted to Kendall/MIT as part of a series of station name changes.

During the 1980s, the MBTA rebuilt Kendall/MIT and other Red Line stations with longer platforms for six-car trains and with elevators for accessibility. The rebuilt station was dedicated in October 1987 and six-car trains began operation on January 21, 1988. Temporary artworks, including an entire fake cafe, were hosted at the station during the renovation as part of the Arts on the Line program.

The main southbound headhouse was reconstructed as part of the Kendall Square Initiative development project. Utility work began in July–August 2020, with excavation beginning in October. Part of the old headhouse was closed in November 2020 for construction of the interim headhouse. The temporary southbound headhouse opened on January 22, 2022. The permanent headhouse opened on February 11, 2023.

The main northbound headhouse was also reconstructed as part of the adjacent 325 Main Street project. The new glass headhouse has redundant elevators and the roof is part of an elevated public plaza. Work on the headhouse began in July 2022. A temporary outbound headhouse, located inside 325 Main Street, was completed in June 2024. The old headhouse was demolished, and steel for the new headhouse assembled, in July 2024. The temporary headhouse included an art installation by Mount Holyoke College professor Ligia Bouton entitled "25 Variable Stars: A Temporary Monument for Henrietta Swan Leavitt". It consisted of lenticular prints honoring Henrietta Swan Leavitt's discovery of the period–luminosity relation for Cepheid variable stars. The new permanent headhouse was largely complete by mid-September, with a certificate of occupancy expected within a month, but opening was delayed until 2026. The new headhouse ultimately opened on April 20, 2026.

=== Circumferential service proposals ===
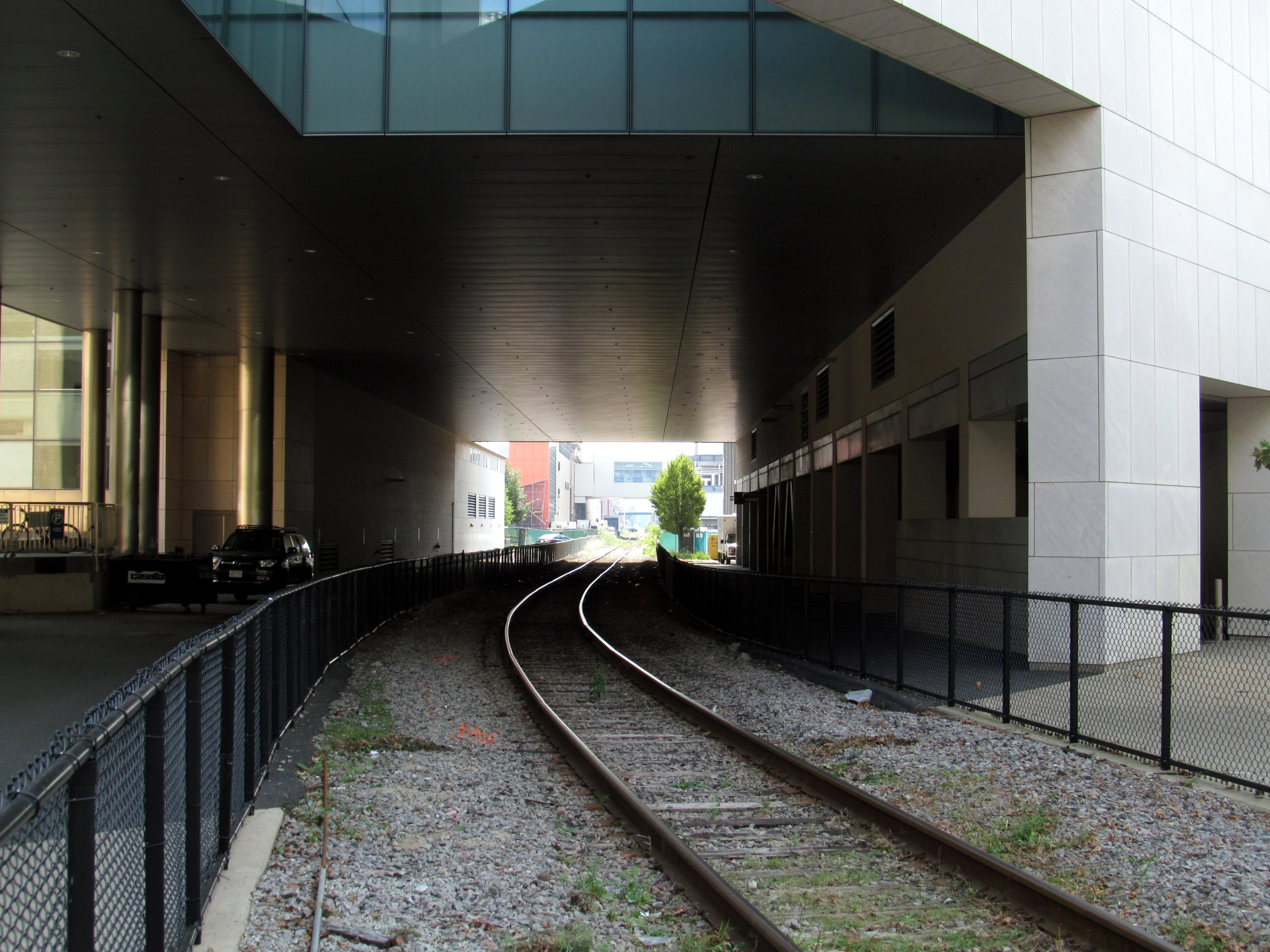
A twice-proposed commuter rail stop at Kendall Square would be located under the MIT Brain and Cognitive Science building; this location was also a proposed stop on the Urban Ring service.

Kendall/MIT was a proposed stop on the Urban Ring – a circumferential bus rapid transit (BRT) line designed to connect the existing radial MBTA rail lines to reduce overcrowding in the downtown stations. Under draft plans released in 2008, new surface-level BRT platforms would have been constructed on Main Street at Kendall/MIT. The project was cancelled in 2010

In 2012, the state studied the feasibility of sending some Framingham/Worcester Line trains to North Station via the Grand Junction Railroad, including the possibility of a new commuter rail station at Kendall. The possible station would have consisted of a single platform between Main Street and Massachusetts Avenue, and was estimated to cost $7.5 million. After objections from the City of Cambridge over potential traffic problems due to the grade crossings on the Grand Junction, the MBTA declined to pursue implementation of the proposed service. In 2014, it was revealed by the state that the stop would be part of the proposed Indigo Line system with frequent DMU service, but that plan was canceled in 2015 for financial reasons.

A 2019 report indicated that daily boardings at the station would double to 30,000 by 2040, increasing the need for relief service on the Grand Junction and other corridors.

As of 2024, two possible locations for a Broadway station on the Grand Junction Branch are being considered: one north of Broadway and one south of that point. This station, and especially the south of Broadway station, would connect with Kendall/MIT.
