= Entrepreneur Walk of Fame =

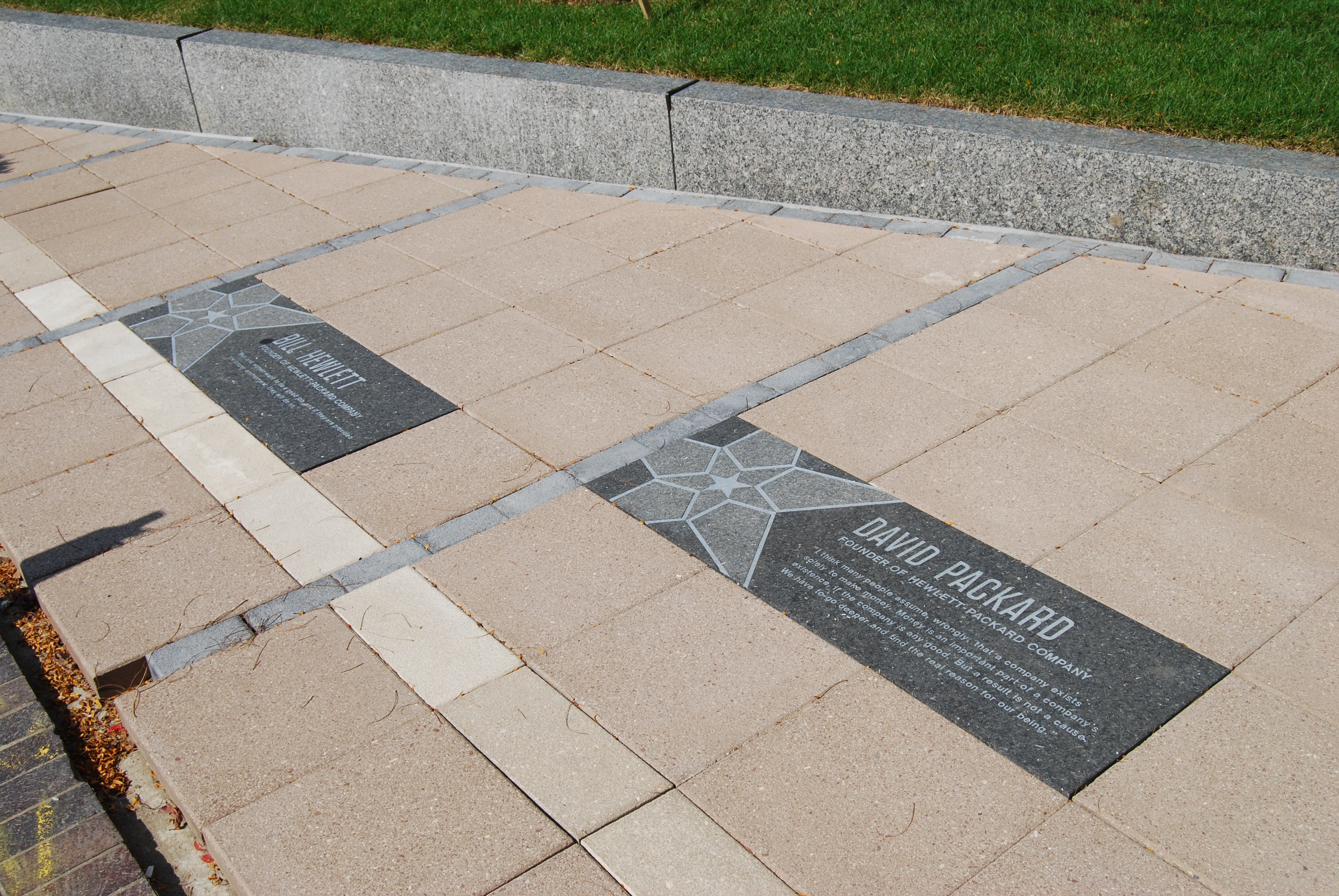
Stars on the Entrepreneur Walk of Fame

The Entrepreneur Walk of Fame was established to recognize the positive impact of entrepreneurs on job creation and technological progress.

Seven honorees were unveiled in the inaugural year. These were Bill Gates, Bill Hewlett, Bob Swanson, David Packard, Mitch Kapor, Steve Jobs, and Thomas Edison. New honorees are unveiled each year in the fall.

The stars are located near the outbound Kendall Square MBTA Red Line stop in Cambridge, Massachusetts.
