= Blake and Knowles Steam Pump Company National Register District =

Historic district in Massachusetts, United States

- U.S. National Register of Historic Places
- U.S. Historic district
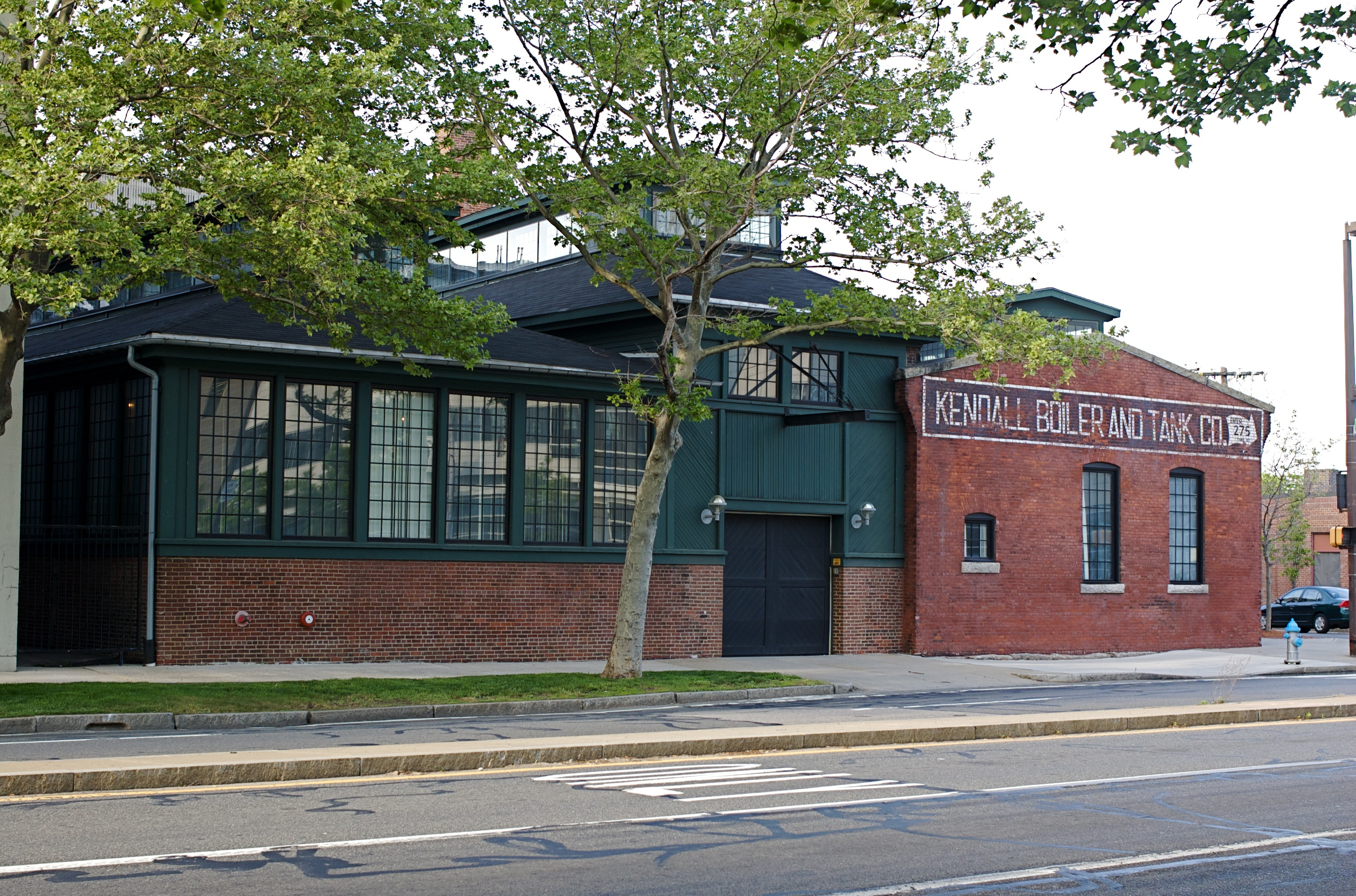
- Kendall Boiler and Tank Company building at Third and Binney Streets

- Location within Massachusetts Location within the United States
- Location: Bounded by 3rd, Rogers, 5th, and Binney Sts., Cambridge, Massachusetts
- Coordinates: 42°21′58″N 71°5′2″W
- Area: 2.4 acres (0.97 ha)
- Built: 1889
- NRHP reference No.: 97000561
- Added to NRHP: June 13, 1997

The Blake and Knowles Steam Pump Company National Register District encompasses the historical industrial complex of the Blake and Knowles Steam Pump Company and its successor, the Worthington Pump and Machinery Corporation in East Cambridge, Massachusetts. It is located in a one-block area surrounded by Third, Rogers, Binney, and Fifth Streets. The property was developed by the Blake and Knowles Steam Pump Company, one of the nation's leading manufacturer of industrial pumps from the late 19th century into the mid-20th century. The district was listed on the National Register of Historic Places in 1997.

== Description and history ==
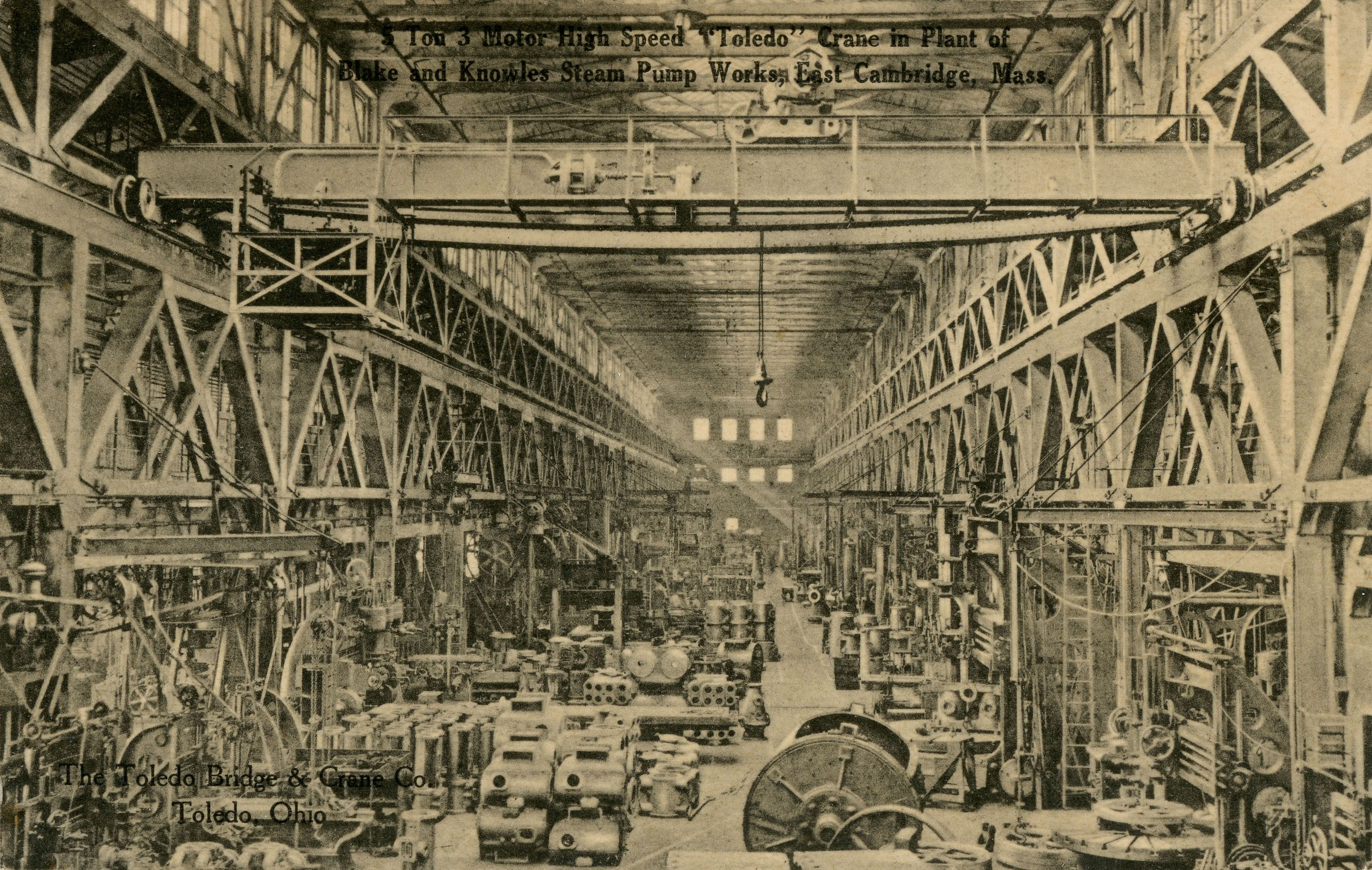
A 1912 postcard depicting the plant's floor, with a 5-ton electric overhead traveling crane manufactured by the Toledo Bridge and Crane Company.

George Blake was the owner of a brickyard in Medford who developed pumps for removing water from brickyard clay pits. Establishing a pump factory in Boston in 1864, he moved to this site in 1886. In 1879 he entered into a financial arrangement with Lucius Knowles, another pump manufacturer, and their two businesses were formally merged in 1897. By this time, the company was a nationally leading supplier of a diversity of industrial pumps. In 1916 it was merged with other pump makers to create the Worthington Pump Works. It provided pumps to the United States Army during World War I, nearly doubling the plant size so that it extended from Bent to Monroe Streets. This plant operated until 1927, when its manufacturing was relocated to Holyoke. Although the buildings were sold off for other industrial uses, the surviving ones have been remarkably little altered.

The surviving elements of the Blake and Knowles are located in East Cambridge, an area that became increasingly industrial as the 19th century progressed. They are located on a single block about 2.4 acres (0.97 ha) in size, bounded by Third, Fifth, Rogers, and Binney Streets. Buildings between Binney and Monroe associated with the company have been demolished, while a few surviving buildings between Rogers and Bent Streets survive in altered form. The complex consists of several machine shops, including its main (200-foot (61 m)) shop, which extends along Rogers Street, and the plant office building, which is also known as the Kendall Boiler and Tank Company after a subsequent owner.

== See also ==
- National Register of Historic Places listings in Cambridge, Massachusetts
