= Paul Matisse =

American artist (born 1933)

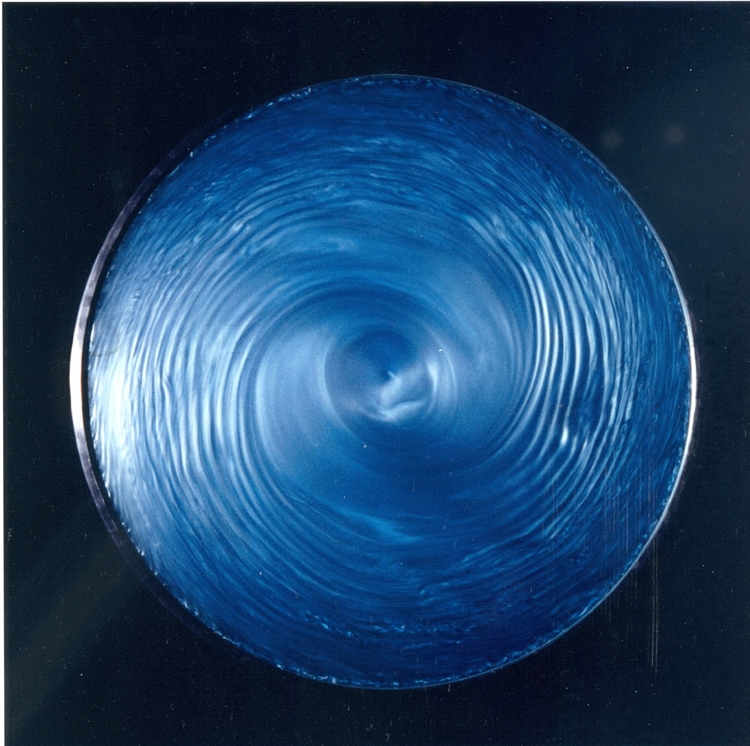
Rotating Kalliroscope

Paul Matisse (born 1933) is an American artist and inventor known for his public art installations, many of which are interactive and produce sound. Matisse also invented the Kalliroscope.

== Early life and education ==
Paul Matisse, born in New York City in 1933, was raised within a family central to the 20th-century art world. He is the son of Pierre Matisse, a prominent French-American art dealer who founded the Pierre Matisse Gallery in New York, and Alexina "Teeny" Sattler. His paternal grandfather was the celebrated Fauvist painter Henri Matisse. Following his parents' divorce in 1949, his mother married the avant-garde artist Marcel Duchamp in 1954, making Duchamp his stepfather. This lineage placed Matisse at the intersection of major artistic movements, though his own interests eventually gravitated toward the marriage of art and engineering.

Matisse pursued his higher education at Harvard University, where he shared a residence in Eliot House with notable figures such as Stephen James Joyce and Sadruddin Aga Khan. He graduated with a Bachelor of Arts in 1954 and subsequently attended the Harvard Graduate School of Design. His early professional career was marked by technical exploration; he worked briefly with the architect Buckminster Fuller and later joined the research firm Arthur D. Little in Cambridge, Massachusetts, focusing on product development. These formative experiences in mechanical design and fluid dynamics culminated in his 1966 invention of the Kalliroscope, a device designed to visualize convective fluid currents, which established his reputation as both an artist and an inventor.

== Artistic career ==
Matisse worked in product development for Arthur D. Little. In 1962 he set off on his own, inventing (1966), patenting (1968), and ultimately manufacturing Kalliroscopes, which can display the complex and otherwise-invisible flow of liquids.

After the death of his stepfather Marcel Duchamp in 1968, Matisse worked with his widowed mother Alexina "Teeny" Duchamp and curator Anne d'Harnoncourt to implement the posthumous installation of Duchamp's artwork Étant donnés at the Philadelphia Museum of Art.

== Personal life ==
Matisse lives in a former Baptist church in Groton, Massachusetts. His daughter Sophie Matisse is an artist in New York City.

== Selected public artworks ==
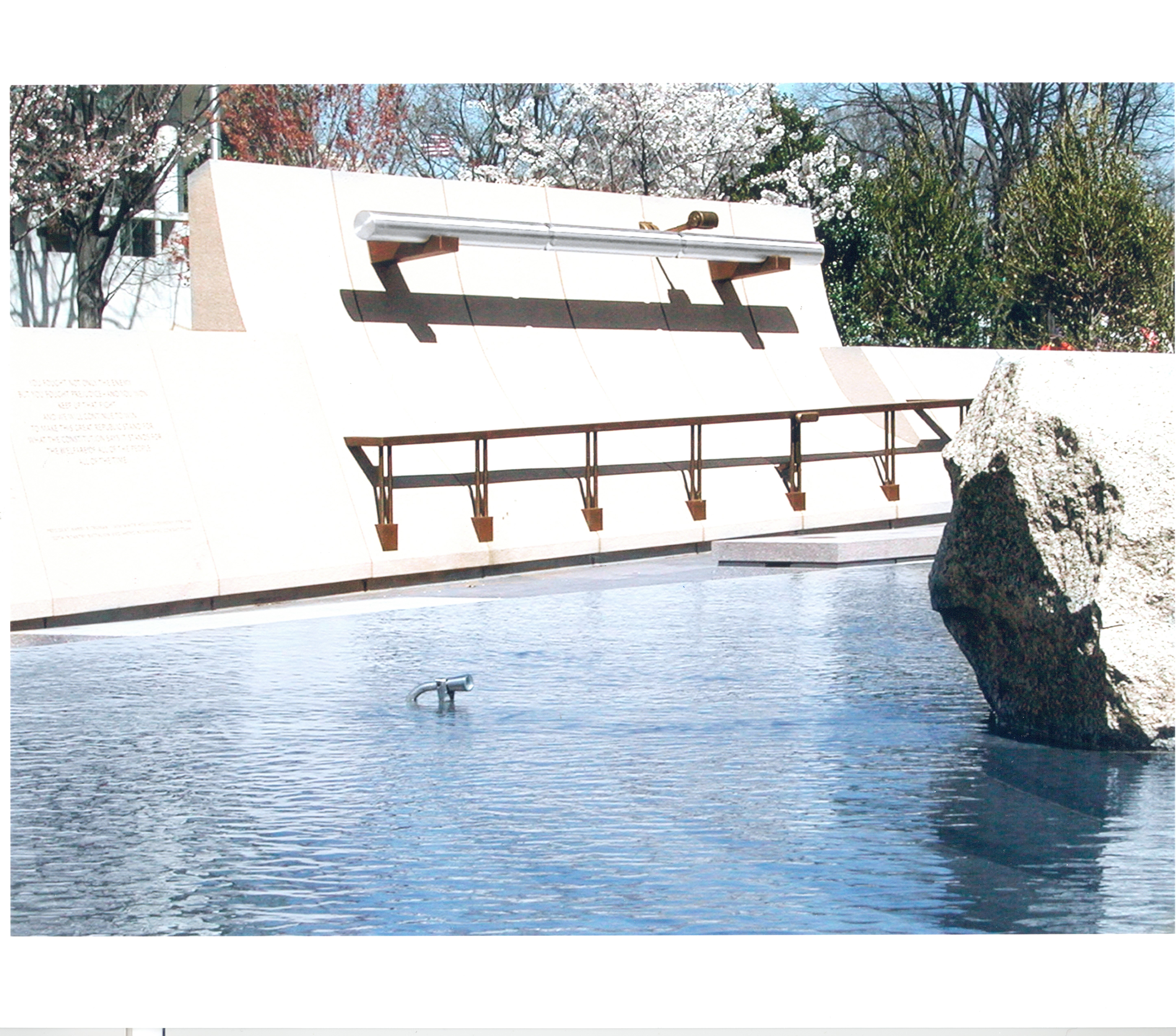
National Japanese American Memorial Bell (2001)

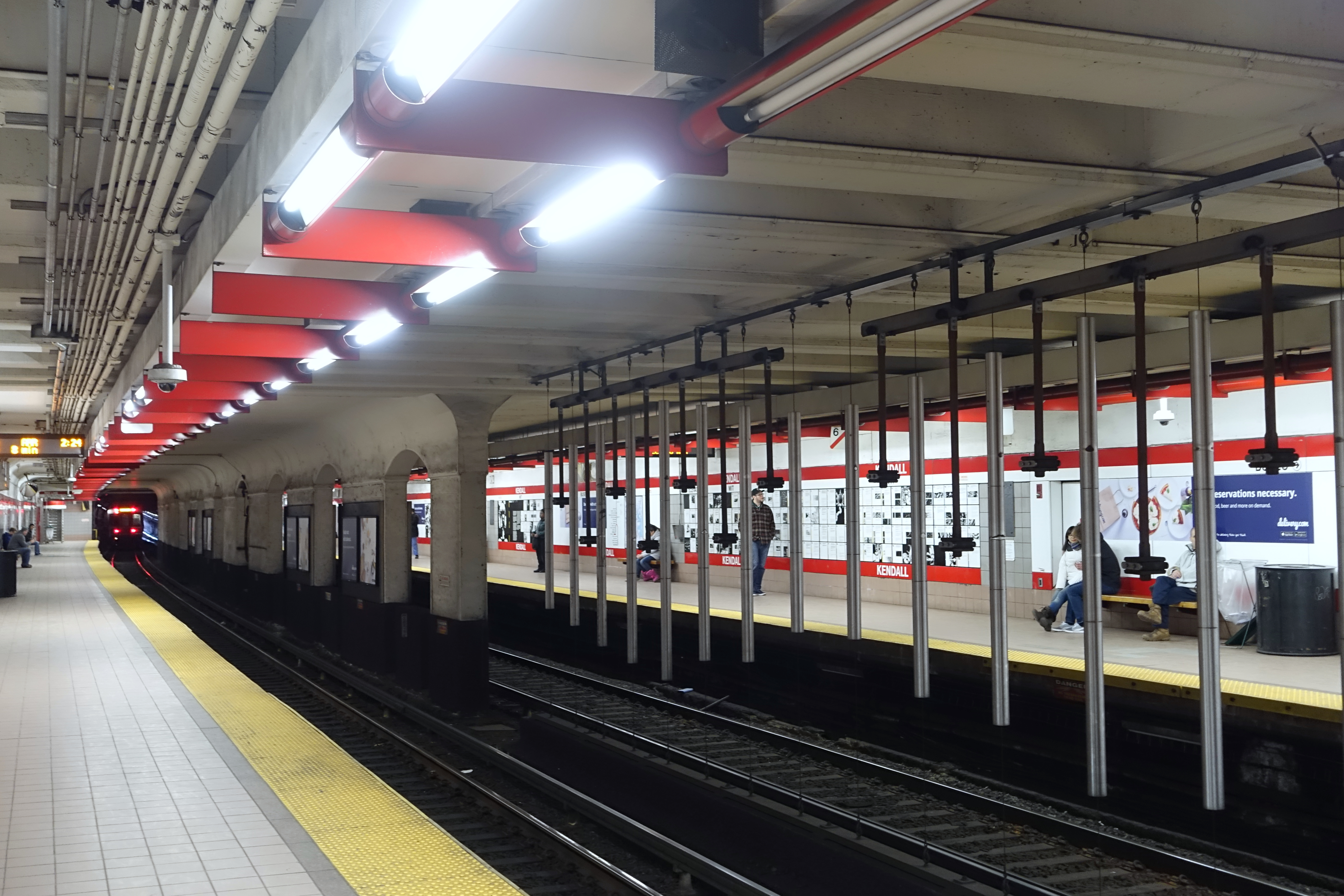
Kendall Band (1987)

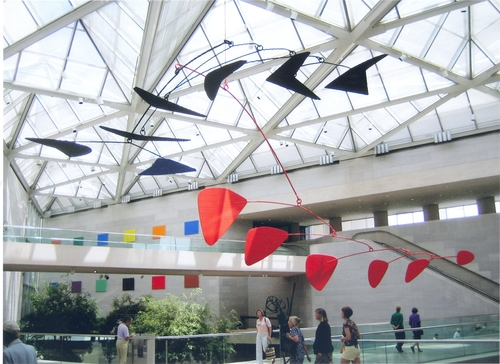
Calder Mobile (1977)
- Meditation Bell (2012) – exhibited at Chateau la Coste in 2018
- Olympic Bell (2004) – installation for the Athens Olympic Games
- Charlestown Bells (2000) – interactive musical sculpture on the Charles River Dam between downtown Boston and the Boston neighborhood of Charlestown
- Memorial Bell (2001) – at the National Japanese-American Memorial to Patriotism in Washington, DC
- Forest Bells (1997) – six vertical aluminum bells hanging from the limbs of oak trees on Groton Conservation Trust property in Groton, Massachusetts
- Kendall Band (1987) – interactive musical sculpture in the MBTA's Kendall/MIT subway station in Cambridge, Massachusetts
- Musical Fence (1980) – interactive musical sculpture once located in Cambridge, Massachusetts, and now installed at the DeCordova Museum in Lincoln, Massachusetts. Another version is at the Montshire Museum of Science in Vermont.
- Untitled (1976) – Alexander Calder's last major artwork, posthumously modified for installation by Paul Matisse
