= Atlas Venture =

American early-stage venture capital firm

- Type: Private
- Industry: Venture Capital
- Founded: 1980
- Founder: Michiel de Haan
- Headquarters: Cambridge, Massachusetts, U.S.
- Key people: Kevin Bitterman; Bruce Booth; Jean-Francois Formela; Michael Gladstone; David Grayzel; Jason Rhodes
- Products: venture capital funds
- AUM: $2.7 billion
- Number of employees: 29
- Website: www.atlasventure.com

Atlas Venture is an early-stage venture capital firm that creates and invests in biotechnology startup companies in the U.S. Atlas is headquartered in Cambridge, Massachusetts, where the majority of its investments are located. Atlas raised its fourteenth fund totaling $450 million in December 2024, and raised its Opportunity Fund II totaling $300 million in September 2021.

== History ==
Originally formed in 1980 in Amsterdam as a subsidiary of NMB Bank, now part of ING Group, Atlas historically invested in both life sciences and information technology startup companies. In October 2014, Atlas announced its shift to a biotech-only venture capital firm, with the technology-focused investment team forming a new firm, Accomplice, to continue investing in information technology startups. Previously as a diversified firm, Atlas had raised over $3.0 billion of investor commitments across nine venture capital funds. The firm raised $705 million for its 2000-vintage fifth fund, $600 million for its 2001-vintage sixth fund, $385 million for its 2006-vintage seventh fund, $283 million for its 2009-vintage eighth fund, and $265 million for its 2013-vintage ninth fund. At its largest, the firm held European offices in London, Paris and Munich, and a West Coast office based in Seattle, Washington, in addition to the Boston-area headquarters. Today, the firm operates from a single office in Cambridge, Massachusetts.

In 2015 Atlas Venture raised its first biotech-dedicated fund, Fund X, at $280 million to invest in early stage biotech companies in the U.S. and around the world. In 2017, Atlas Venture raised Fund XI at $350 million. In January 2019 Atlas Venture raised $250 million for its Opportunity Fund I, a complementary strategy focusing investment in growth financings of companies in Atlas' main fund portfolios. In June 2020 Atlas Venture raised its Fund XII $400 million. In March 2022, Atlas Venture raised Fund XIII at $450 million. Atlas Venture raised Fund XIV in December 2024 at $450 million.
