= Kendall Square =

Neighborhood in Cambridge, Massachusetts, USA

Coordinates: 42°21′44″N 71°5′3″W

Kendall Square is a neighborhood in Cambridge, Massachusetts, United States. The square itself is located at the intersection of Main Street and Broadway. It also refers to the broad business district east of Portland Street, northwest of the Charles River, north of MIT and south of Binney Street.

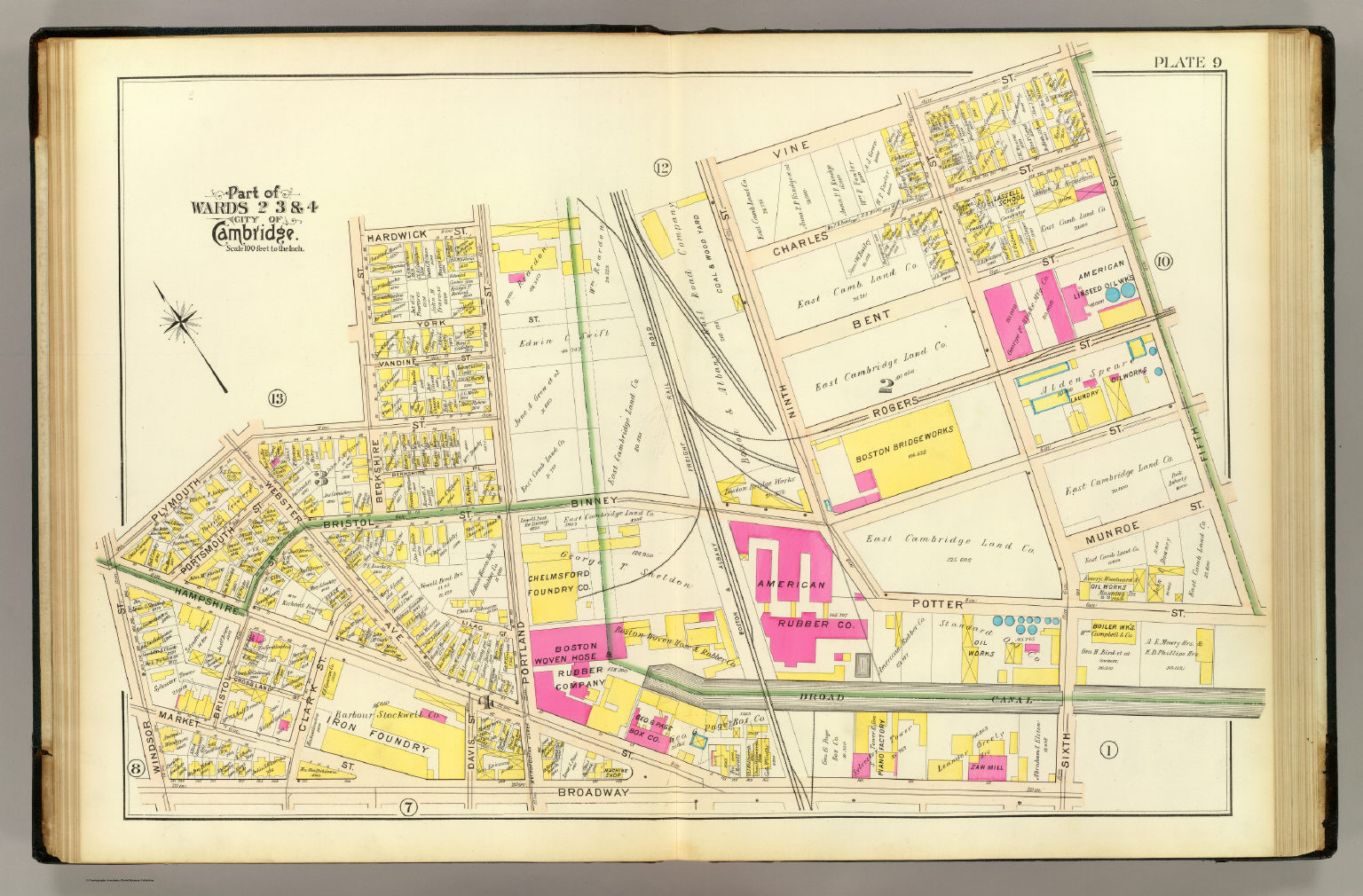
Cambridge, Massachusetts, Kendall Square Area, 1903; George W. and Walter S. Bromley, Civil Engineers

Kendall Square has been called "the most innovative square mile on the planet", in reference to the high concentration of entrepreneurial start-ups and quality of innovation which have emerged in the vicinity of the square since 2010.

The neighborhood has approximately 50,000 people who work in the area on a daily basis and a growing residential population.

== Industrial district (c.1800–1990) ==
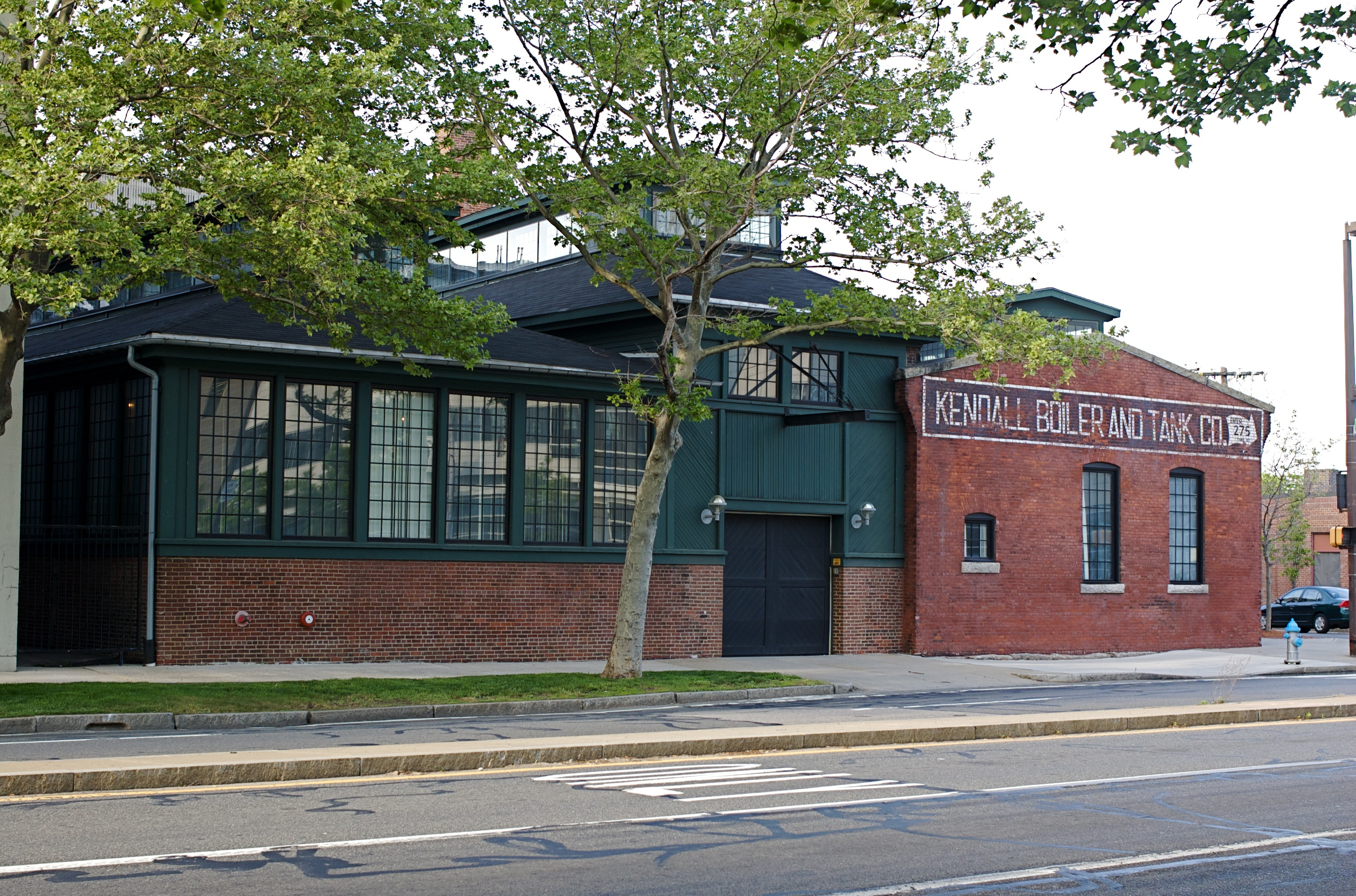
A building once part of the Kendall Boiler and Tank Company, a landmark at Binney and Third Streets

Originally a salt marsh on the Charles River between Boston and Cambridge, Kendall Square has been an important transportation hub since the construction of the West Boston Bridge in 1793,which provided the first direct wagon route between the two settlements. By 1810, the Broad Canal had been dug, which would connect with a system of smaller canals in this East Cambridge seaport area.

From 1880 to 1910, the eastern part of Cambridge hosted a variety of industries, including "printing and publishing, musical instruments (especially organs and pianos), furniture, clothing, carpenters work, soap and candles, and biscuit making." Heavy machinery was also produced here. Cambridge was once the third-largest pork packer in the US.

One of these factories was the Kendall Boiler and Tank Company. The square was named after the company, which in turn was named after one of its owners, Edward Kendall. The square itself consisted of the triangle defined by Main Street, Broadway, and the short stretch of Third Street between them, now the site of the Galaxy: Earth Sphere fountain and the surrounding plaza.

When the Longfellow Bridge replaced the West Boston Bridge in 1907, it included provisions for a future rapid-transit subway link to Harvard Square and Boston (now the Red Line); the original Kendall subway station was opened in 1912. In 1916, the Massachusetts Institute of Technology moved from its original campus in Back Bay, Boston, to its new Cambridge campus, located south of Kendall Square between Main Street and Massachusetts Avenue. Since then, the proximity of MIT, whose campus eventually expanded into Kendall Square, has influenced much of the development of the area, and contributed to its development as a technology hub.

World War I consumed a great deal of Cambridge's production. After the war, other products were also produced: "soap, rubber goods, books, metal products, electrical equipment, furniture, ink, pianos, candy and ice cream". The Boston Woven Hose company and Lever Brothers were major employers, and Cambridge became the second-largest industrial city in Massachusetts.

After World War II, manufacturing stagnated, and from 1945 to 1965, the heaviest industries—"food, chemicals, rubber, plastics, machinery"—declined by 30-50%. At the same time, technical work grew by 35%.

In 1961, after announcing the American effort to land a man on the moon, President John F. Kennedy (a Massachusetts native) wanted to make Cambridge the site of NASA's newly expanded mission control center. Kennedy allowed his vice president Lyndon B. Johnson (a native Texan) to choose Houston, Texas for the complex, now the Johnson Spaceflight Center. To mark the beginning of construction, Kennedy would give his "We choose to go to the Moon" speech in Houston, not Cambridge. (A Cambridge urban legend is that the Kennedy assassination is what moved Mission Control from Cambridge to Houston, but this is untrue.)

In 1964, Kendall Square got a much smaller NASA Electronic Research Center instead. President Richard M. Nixon would shut it down only five years later.

Former Massachusetts Governor John A. Volpe, who served as US Secretary of Transportation (DOT) from 1969 to 1973, succeeded in getting the former NASA buildings rededicated to a new DOT research center, which was later named the John A. Volpe National Transportation Systems Center in his memory. For the next twenty years, other large parcels of Kendall Square, which had also been cleared in anticipation of a much larger NASA complex, were an unoccupied post-industrial wasteland.

Another contribution came when Harvard University announced plans to construct a high-containment lab in which it would experiment with recombinant DNA. Opposition from Cambridge mayor Alfred Vellucci resulted in the city council passing a three-month moratorium and convening a citizen's committee to study the issue. The resulting regulations passed in 1977 by the council provided certainty for research and development organizations, and led to the creation of the Kendall biotechnology cluster. The first companies taking advantage of this were Harvard spin-off Genetics Institute (which ended up in Cambridge after opposition in Boston and Somerville, and which would eventually become part of Pfizer), and Biogen, which located in the city in 1982.

== Office, research, retail, and housing developments (1990–present) ==
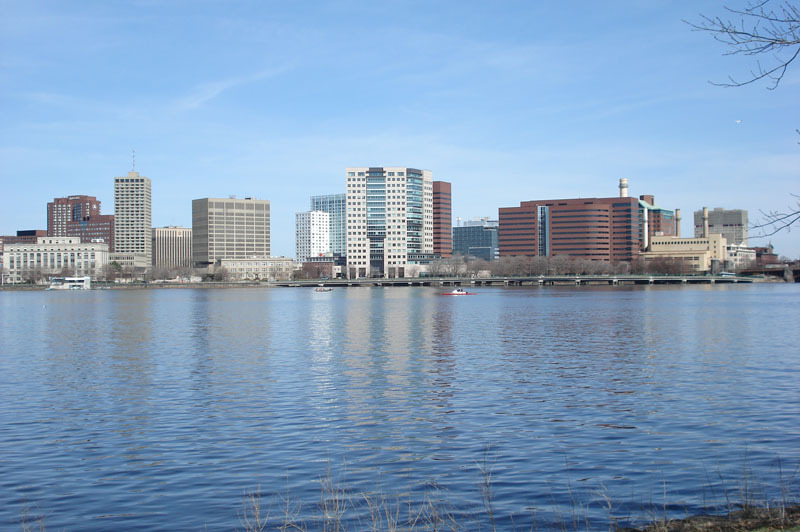
Kendall Square viewed from across the Charles River

In the 1990s and 2000s, the area northeast of Kendall, in the direction of the then-new CambridgeSide Galleria shopping mall was transformed from an industrial area into a collection of office and research buildings, housing over 150 biotechnology and information technology firms as of 2011. In 1997, the surviving industrial buildings between Third, Binney, Fifth, and Rogers Streets were declared the Blake and Knowles Steam Pump Company National Register District.

High technology firms are lured in part by the proximity of the Massachusetts Institute of Technology (MIT) campus on the south side of Main Street. MIT owns a significant amount of the commercial real estate in the square, and has been actively constructing space for new high-tech tenants as well as rebuilding its own facilities fronting Main Street. Nearby MIT facilities include the Stata Center and the MIT Sloan School of Management, as well as many other buildings of the eastern end of the MIT campus.

The Cambridge Center office development is closest to the junction of Main Street and Broadway and the MBTA subway station at the traditional core of Kendall Square. On December 2, 1982, the Kendall/MIT subway station was renamed "Cambridge Center/MIT", although few signs were changed to reflect this. There were many complaints that the MBTA had suddenly changed the name without public input, and that the new name would be confused with the next Red Line station at Central Square. On June 26, 1985, the name was reverted to Kendall/MIT.

The Cambridge Innovation Center, a shared office space for startups and venture capital firms founded by Tim Rowe and currently occupied by almost 400 small startup businesses, is also close by at One Broadway. Google, Facebook, and IBM have research labs located in or immediately adjacent to Kendall Square.

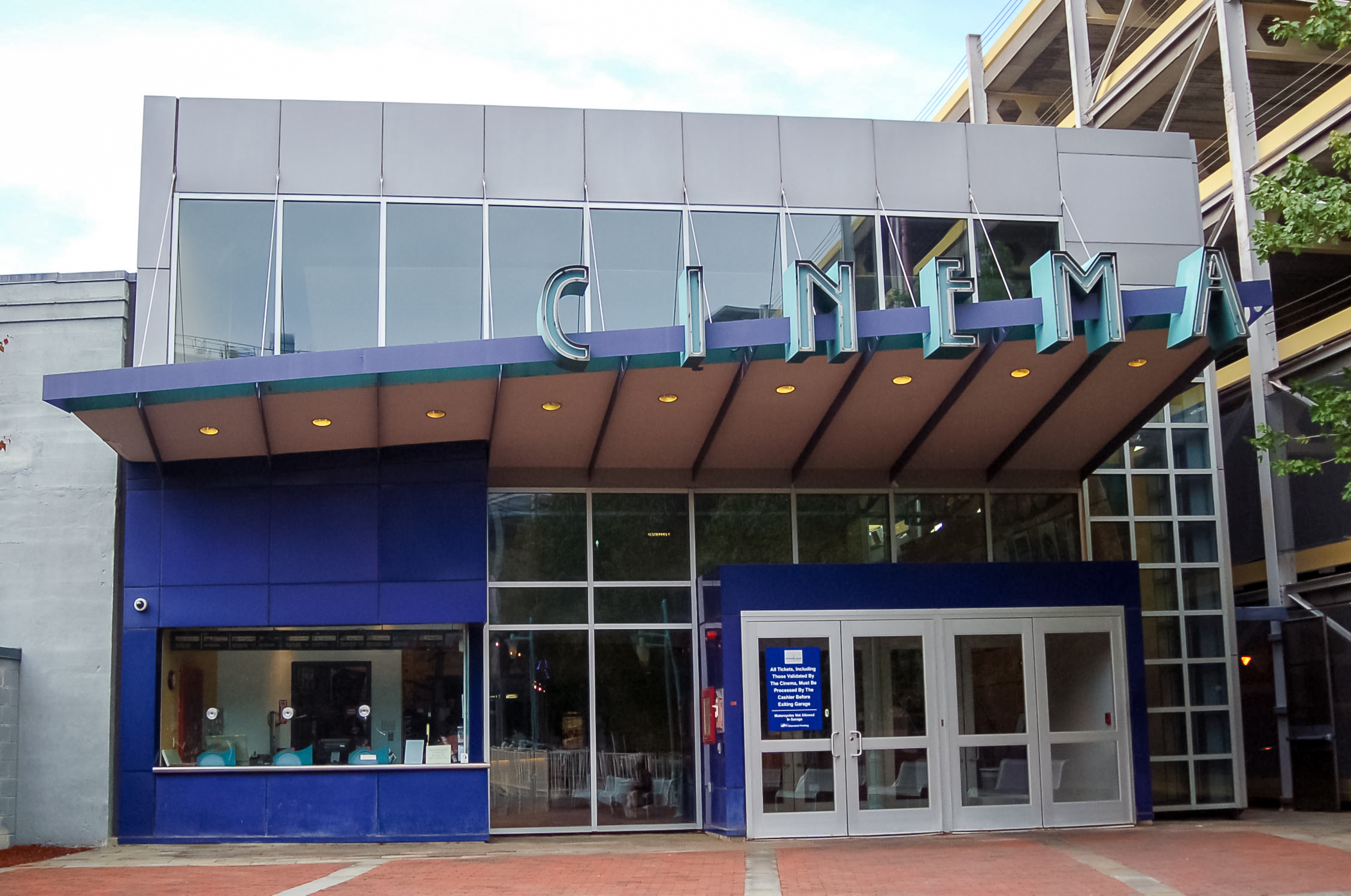
Landmark Kendall Square Cinema in 2009

Many other high technology firms are in two nearby multi-building office complex parks, both located about a 1/2 mile (0.80 km) from the traditional hub of Kendall Square. To the west, Technology Square is directly behind the main campus of MIT, and once housed its computer research labs. The confusingly-named One Kendall Square complex is located between Broadway and Binney Street (across from Landmark's Kendall Square Cinema, a small cineplex), northwest of the traditional Kendall Square hub.

The "@Kendall Square" development is located one block north of Kendall Square, and includes a mixed-use "live, work, play" community that weaves parks, an ice rink, a farmers market, and a recreational boating basin through a series of office, lab, residential and retail buildings. Buildings within the @Kendall Square development have won numerous design awards including the AIA California Council's 2004 Architectural Design Merit Award, the Boston Society of Architects' 2004 Interior Architecture/Interior Design Honor Award, the Chicago Athenaeum 2004 American Architecture Award, the AIA 2004 Excellence in Sustainable Design Award, and the AIA COTE 2004 Top Ten Green Projects Award.

In 2016, the City of Cambridge approved MIT's plans for six major buildings with floorspace totaling 1,800,000 square feet (170,000 m^{2}) as part of its "Kendall Square Initiative" development. One building, at 314 Main Street, will have as a principal tenant, the Boeing Company, which will lease 100,000 square feet (9,300 m^{2}) of lab and office space.

By 2014, a U.S. Department of Transportation building complex and its surrounding parking lots and open land at the western end of Kendall Square constituted one of the largest remaining areas not already subject to 21st century development. The Boston Globe published an article describing possible plans to repurpose the DOT property for future redevelopment, which would require federal approval for relocation of the DOT center, probably to a more-compact building with underground parking. A related article described some ideas on how to use the DOT land more effectively.

the new Volpe Center as seen from the side.

In January 2017, MIT signed an agreement with the federal government to purchase the 14-acre (5.7 ha) site of the John A. Volpe National Transportation Systems Center in Kendall Square, for $750 million. As a part of the agreement, MIT would a build a new replacement research facility for the Department of Transportation, before demolishing the former building for redevelopment of the entire parcel. Long-term planning had begun for the site, which was not expected to accelerate development until the Kendall Square Initiative construction had been largely been completed.. The new Volpe Center opened in 2023.

== Businesses and organizations ==
The Kendall Square Association is the official business and civic development organization for Kendall Square, and was formed by approximately 80 organizations in February 2009. Its motto is "We share more than a future, we share a sidewalk". It has developed and distributed a free "Kendall Square Walking Map" showing destinations and attractions within a 10-minute walking radius from Kendall/MIT station.

Several hotels are located in Kendall Square, including the Boston Marriott Cambridge, the Cambridge Residence Inn, and the Kendall Hotel, and several more hotels are located within walking distance. There have also been several large condominium and rental developments, greatly expanding the residential population of the area. As of 2020, MIT is building residences for 450 graduate students, plus 290 affordable or market-rate units.

The MIT branch of the Harvard/MIT Cooperative Society ("The Coop") has for decades operated a modest department store and general bookstore at 325 Main Street, as Kendall Square's largest retailer. In February 2019, the store moved to smaller temporary quarters at 80 Broadway, to allow for demolition of the building housing its former location. A new, taller 16-story building will be constructed on the site, and the Coop is expected to move into a space larger than its temporary quarters, but possibly smaller than its previous space at that location.

In December 2017, Roche Bros and MIT agreed to put a supermarket in the center of the Kendall business and residential district. The store, opened in November 2019 at One Broadway, is a 12,000-square-foot (1,100 m^{2}) small-format "Brothers Marketplace" which offers fresh, to-go, and prepared foods.

For decades, the MIT Press Bookstore was a regional attraction in the heart of Kendall Square, offering a complete selection of Press titles for browsing and retail purchase, plus a large selection of complementary works from other academic and trade publishers, including magazines and academic journals. Starting in October 2016, the Bookstore was temporarily relocated to Central Square, just north of the previous location of the MIT Museum, because of extensive construction on its former site. In 2022, the Bookstore moved into a new building at 314 Main Street, adjacent to an existing subway entrance to Kendall/MIT station. Sharing the same building, in 2022 the MIT Museum moved to Kendall Square for the first time, including a newly expanded museum store.

=== Resident diplomatic missions ===
- (United Kingdom) British Consulate-General – One Broadway

== Transportation access ==
Kendall/MIT station on the MBTA Red Line is located along Main Street directly beneath Kendall Square. MBTA bus routes 64, 68, 85 and CT2 also stop here, as well as the EZRide shuttle between Cambridgeport and North Station, and a free shuttle to the CambridgeSide Galleria Mall.

== Public art ==
A popular public artwork is the Kendall Band, an interactive sound sculpture by Paul Matisse, located in the Kendall/MIT subway station underground in the heart of the Square.

A bronze fountain sculpture, Galaxy: Earth Sphere by MIT professor Joe Davis, is installed at the junction of Main Street and Broadway in the Square. The fountain was designed to have flowing water and to emit low-temperature steam, but has been partially or completely non-operational for years at a time.

Small stainless-steel bicycle parking racks have been installed on sidewalks in the area, with various science-themed shapes, such as a sine wave or a caffeine molecule. They were commissioned in 2012 from five local artists after a public competition run by the City of Cambridge.
