= Project Sonapahar =

Miyawaki forest in Bangladesh

- Location within Bangladesh
- Location: Mirsharai, Chittagong, Bangladesh
- Coordinates: 22.8364°N 91.5529°E
- Website: sonapahar.com

Project Sonapahar (Bengali: প্রকল্প সোনাপাহাড়) is a privately initiated eco-based project located in Mirsharai Upazila, Chittagong District, Bangladesh. The project is known for its pocket-style artificial forest, conservation of native plant species, and nature-based day tourism activities.

== History ==
The site where the project now stands was previously used for brick kiln operations. The area's environment was adversely affected by emissions from brick kilns and hill-cutting activities. To help restore the local ecosystem, an afforestation program was launched with the participation of several entrepreneurs, including Amjad Hossain.

== Miyawaki Forest ==
A forest has been established at Project Sonapahar using the Miyawaki (or Pocket) method. Several news outlets have referred to it as the first Miyawaki forest in Bangladesh.

The Miyawaki method was pioneered by Japanese botanist Akira Miyawaki and is designed to create dense, fast-growing forests in a relatively small area. According to individuals associated with the project, around 120 species of native trees and climbing plants have been planted on approximately 4,400 square feet of land.

== Tourism ==
Project Sonapahar is also known as a day-tourism destination. The site has gained popularity among visitors seeking a short getaway close to nature.

== Awards and recognition ==
In 2024, Project Sonapahar was awarded the Poribesh Padak by BRAC Bank for its environmental conservation initiatives, including the establishment of the country's first private Miyawaki forest.

== See also ==
- Pocket forest
