= Xeriscaping =

Water conserving landscaping method

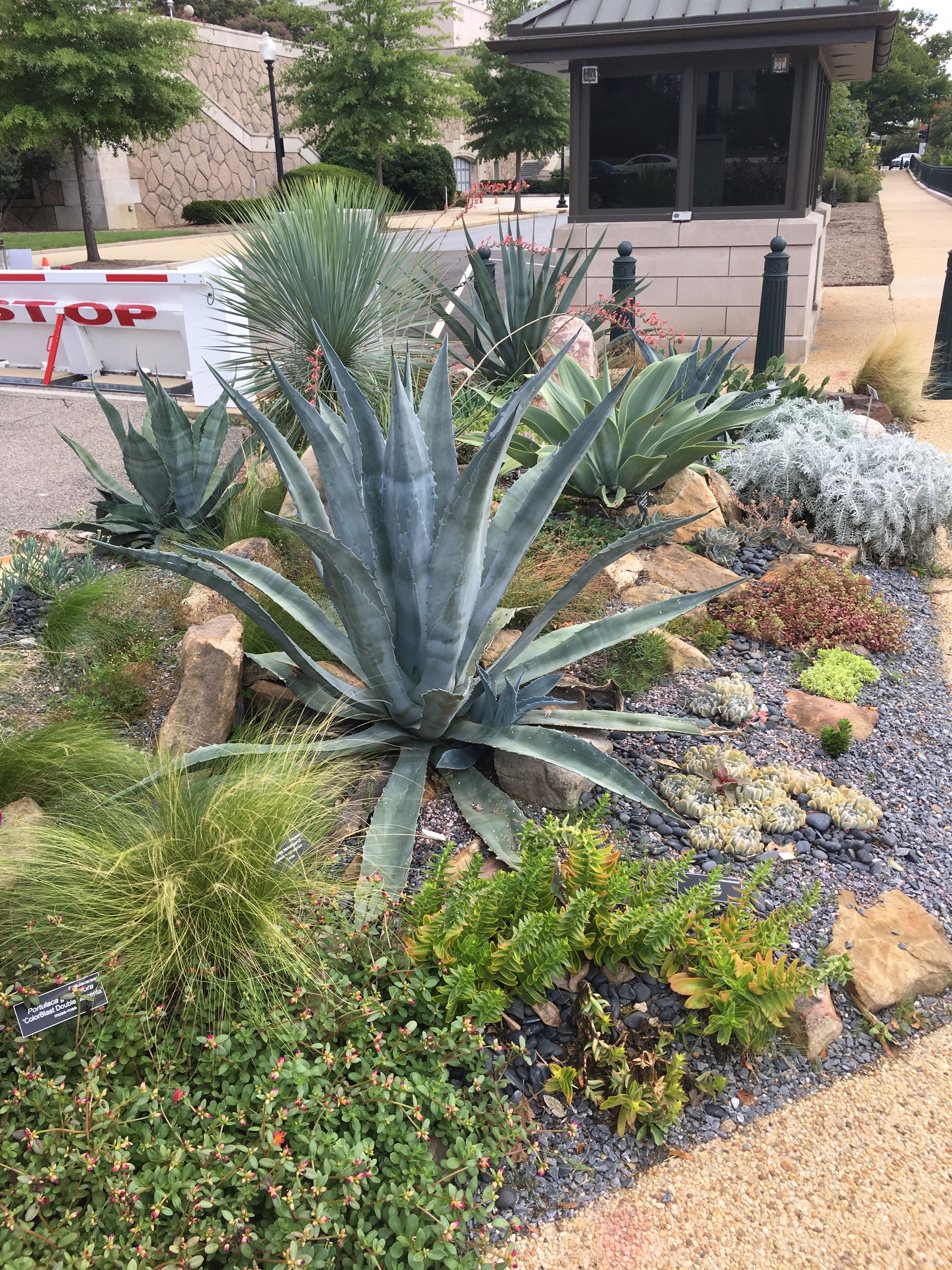
An example of xeriscaping outside the United States Capitol in Washington, DC

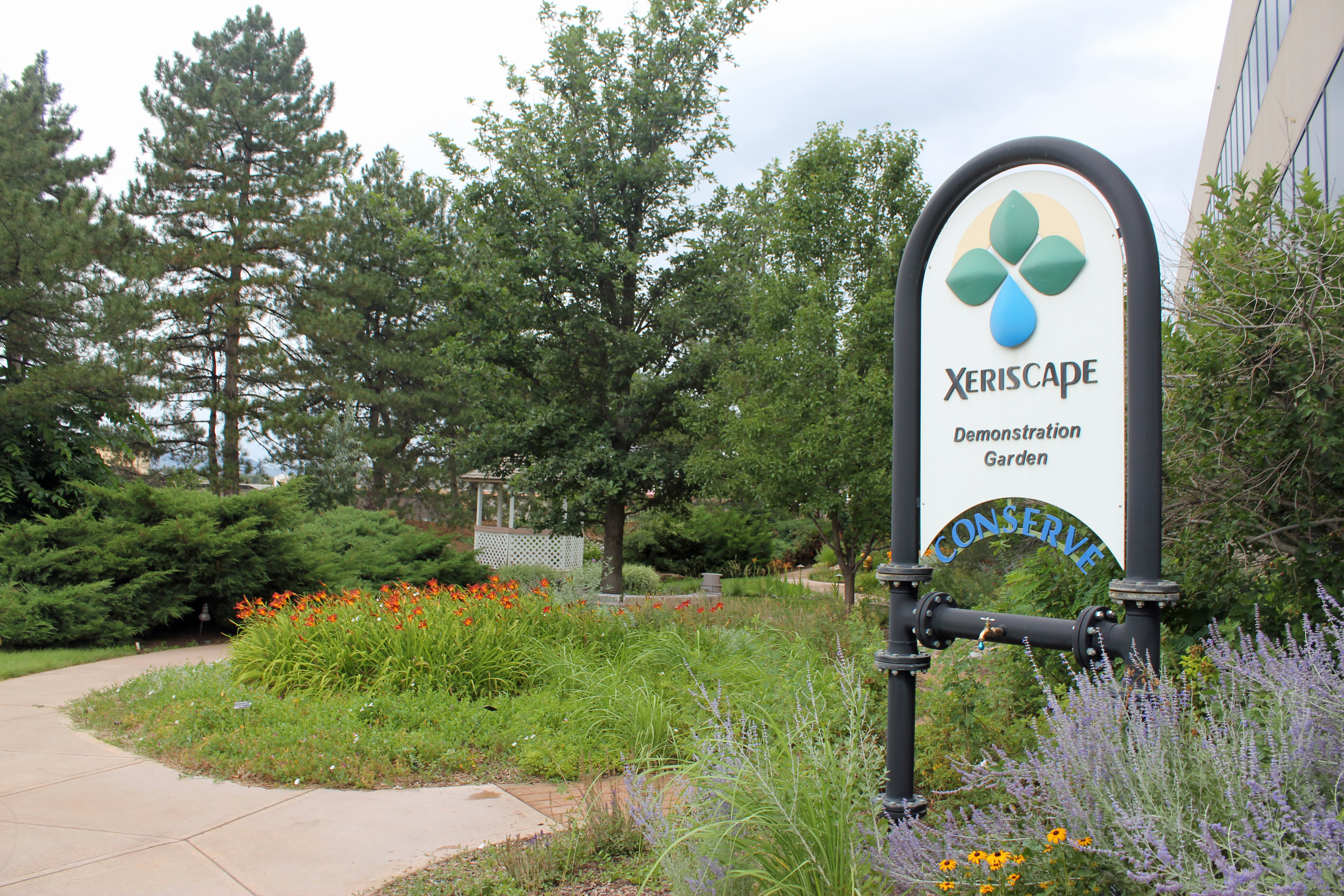
The Xeriscape Demonstration Garden at the headquarters of Denver Water in Denver, Colorado

Xeriscaping is the process of landscaping, or gardening, that reduces or eliminates the need for irrigation. It is promoted in regions that do not have accessible, plentiful, or reliable supplies of fresh water and has gained acceptance in other regions as access to irrigation water has become limited, though it is not limited to such climates. Xeriscaping may be an alternative to various types of traditional gardening.

In some areas, terms such as water-conserving landscaping, drought-tolerant landscaping, and smart scaping are used instead. The use of plants whose natural requirements are appropriate to the local climate is emphasized, and care is taken to avoid losing water to evaporation and runoff. However, the specific plants used in xeriscaping vary based on climate as this strategy can be used in xeric, mesic, and hydric environments. Xeriscaping is different from natural landscaping, because the emphasis in xeriscaping is on selection of plants for water conservation, not necessarily selecting native plants.

Xeriscaping produces greenspaces that require low amounts of maintenance and irrigation, and promote biodiversity; however, due to societal norms and lack of landscape understanding, public perception of xeriscaping has frequently been negative, as some assume that these types of landscapes are ugly expanses of just cactus and gravel. However, studies have shown that education in water conservation practices and xeriscaping's benefits can greatly improve the public's perception of xeriscaping.

== Etymology and similar terms ==
Nancy Leavitt, an environmental planner with Denver Water, coined the term xeriscape in 1981 by combining landscape with the Greek root xero-, from ξηρός (xēros), meaning 'dry'. The term zero-scaping (or zeroscaping) is sometimes erroneously substituted for xeriscaping due to phonetic similarity. When used intentionally, zero-scaping usually refers to a different type of low-water landscaping that uses very few plants or none at all. Because o is the most common connecting vowel in Greco-Roman vocabulary, xeriscaping is sometimes misspelled as xeroscaping. Similar terms and phrases include water-conserving landscaping, drought-tolerant landscaping, and smart scaping. In 2023, Denver Water began to rebrand xeriscaping in its own promotions as ColoradoScaping, seeking to avoid some of the negative connotations of xeriscaping, including the phonetic similarity to zeroscaping. ColoradoScaping has been interpreted to have a narrower definition with an emphasis on at least 50 percent plant cover and an emphasis on native plants.

== Advantages ==
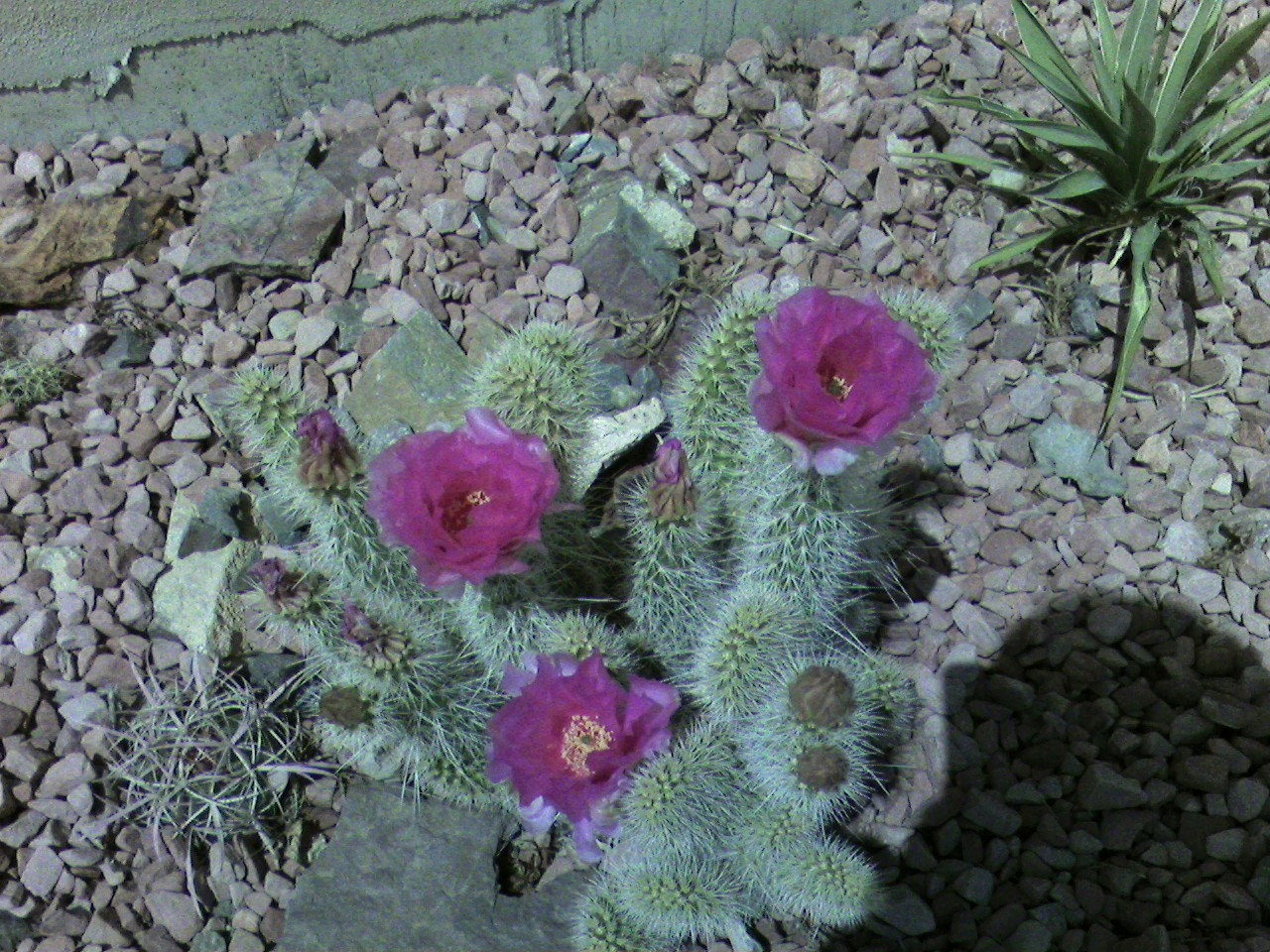
Cacti are some of the low-water-consuming plants often used in xeriscaping.

Xeriscaping has the potential to reduce water usage and maintenance, improve biodiversity, lower pollution, as well as mitigate heat within urban areas; however, the effectiveness of this sustainable process has not been evaluated on a long-term large-scale basis. It was found that in arid US states, like Arizona and Nevada, that 75% of households' potable water was used to water residential and urban lawns. Xeriscaping aims to help preserve water for people and animals amidst an increase in droughts brought about by climate change.

=== Water conservation and lower maintenance ===
Xeriscapes can reduce water consumption by 60% or more compared to regular lawn landscapes. In Turkey, one of the first large scale xeriscaping evaluations was conducted. It was found that switching an average city park to more native vegetation in the region can lower irrigation usage by 30–50%. Assuming a water usage reduction of 30% it was found that a city can save roughly $2 million annually (however, this exact value is dependent on location). The use of native plants lowers the necessity of watering as the vegetation has already adapted to thrive in the climate and does not require assistance with irrigation or fertilization.

The Leadership in Energy and Environmental Design program has recognized xeriscaping as an effective water reduction process and has started to incorporate credits in the certification process across all their programs for facilities that reduce their outside water use and irrigation. This credit can be met by using xeriscape strategies and efficient irrigation systems. This further validates the beneficial claims behind xeriscaping, and it is anticipated that more energy and environmental credit systems as well state ran programs will encourage and incentivize xeriscaping for greenspace development.

While evaluating the cost of annual maintenance and park construction, xeriscaping drastically lowers these costs by roughly 55% and 57%, respectively. Aside from occasional weeding and mulching, xeriscaping requires far less time and effort to maintain. This is the case because under xeriscaping principles the vegetation used for urban greenspaces are indigenous to the area; therefore, are less expensive and require less assistance to acclimate and survive in the environment when compared to imported vegetation. This means that the systems use less water as well as lower rates of pesticides, and fertilizers when compared to current urban and residential greenspaces; this further helps lower annual maintenance costs. Maintenance waste, such as lawn clippings, contribute organic waste to landfills and fertilizers contribute to urban runoff pollution; however, xeriscaping eliminates these negative effects as clippings are encouraged to remain on the greenspace which allows for a lower use of fertilizers.

=== Biodiversity ===
Often, when areas develop there is a loss of forestation, and animal populations dwindle as they are forced to relocate. Implementing native vegetation in green spaces helps improve the insect and wildlife found in the environment as the habitat is reestablished to a degree, offering food and shelter to the wildlife. One application of xeriscaping that drastically improves biodiversity is the implementation of pocket forests.

=== Environmental and thermal discomfort remediation ===
Xeriscaping has been theorized to help offset the urban heat island (UHI) effect. UHI refers to the phenomenon in which urban areas are found to be hotter than neighboring rural sites due to large amounts of human activity. This temperature difference of a city area and its surroundings is usually higher at night as winds are lower and cannot dissipate the large amounts of heat generated in an urban area's boundaries as readily. Upon investigating xeriscaping strategies in Phoenix, Arizona, it was found that dry areas that utilized xeriscaping with shade trees were found to mitigate UHI effects during the day and night with an average temperature difference of roughly 2.5 °C (4.5 °F) cooler. However, when these same strategies were implemented in a mesic area, an environment with moderate amounts of moisture, it was found that thermal discomfort increased for residents and that these strategies had opposite effects to their intentions. Although xeriscaping strategies were found to mitigate UHI effects, it remains important to consider the climate and current landscape in which it is implemented in, in order to maximize its benefits and effectiveness.

== Legal issue ==
=== United States homeowners associations ===
Some homeowners associations (HOAs) have strict rules requiring a certain percentage of land to be used as lawns but these rules either have been or are in the process of being overturned in many areas. Some US states (such as Texas and Florida) have passed legislation that allows homeowners to design lawns using xeriscaping methods, by prohibiting HOAs from imposing restrictions (e.g. on plant types) that are not "reasonable".

=== Theft ===
As more homeowners take up xeriscaping, or drought-tolerant landscaping, garden retailers have struggled to keep up. A burgeoning poaching trade has filled the gap with cacti and succulents stolen from parks and private lands. Buyers as far away as Europe and Asia can end up with yuccas, agaves, and ocotillos uprooted illegally from southern North America and shipped overseas.

== Lawns and applications ==
One of the major challenges to the public acceptance of xeriscaping is the cultural attachment to turf grass lawns. Originally implemented in England, lawns have become in some regions a symbol of prosperity, order, and community. In the United States, turf grasses are so common that it is the single most irrigated nonfood crop by surface area, covering nearly 128,000 square kilometres (49,000 sq mi). Despite the high water, fertilizer, and maintenance costs associated with lawns, they have become the social norm in urban and suburban areas, even if they are rarely used for recreational or other purposes. Xeriscaping offers an alternative to the over-use of turf grass lawns, but are not widely accepted because of preconceived notions of what it means to xeriscape. Xeriscaping can include lawn areas but seeks to reduce them to areas that will actually be used, rather than using them as a default landscaping plan. Xeriscaping is closely linked to movements and ideologies that advocate for more natural vegetation in residential and urban areas. One form of xeriscaping that has received a lot of attention is the implementation of pocket forests.

Akira Miyawaki was a Japanese botanist who developed the idea of pocket forests which reintroduces indigenous trees and vegetation to developed environments in order to promote strong biodiversity. The method calls for the planting of naturally occurring trees and shrubbery densely into small compact areas, that can range from a size of a tennis court to a parking space. These pocket forests increase biodiversity, reduce noise (if placed near streets or noise polluters), improve air quality and soil retention, help with reforestation, and efficiently capture carbon dioxide. In order to promote fast growth and biodiversity the engineered ecosystem requires a layering of vegetation: the ground layer, a shrub layer, and a canopy layer. Due to this compact layering these forests usually are well established within two decades rather than the 70-plus years it takes for naturally occurring forests.

Other forms of xeriscaping include rain gardens. These gardens are used to reduce the amount of runoff from impervious areas (such as roofs, driveways, sidewalks, etc.) and rely on water retentive plants and soil mediums to help filter pollutants from the storm water before it is reintroduced into aquifers and storm drains. These gardens require little irrigation and maintenance, and help protect waterways and remove pollutants.

There are many other forms and applications of xeriscaping: it is essentially any form of landscaping that requires little to no irrigation. However, it is important to take note of the environment before implementation, and follow the principles, as success of one type of xeriscape in a xeric climate might not have the same effects if it were implemented in a mesic or hydric environment.

== Gallery ==
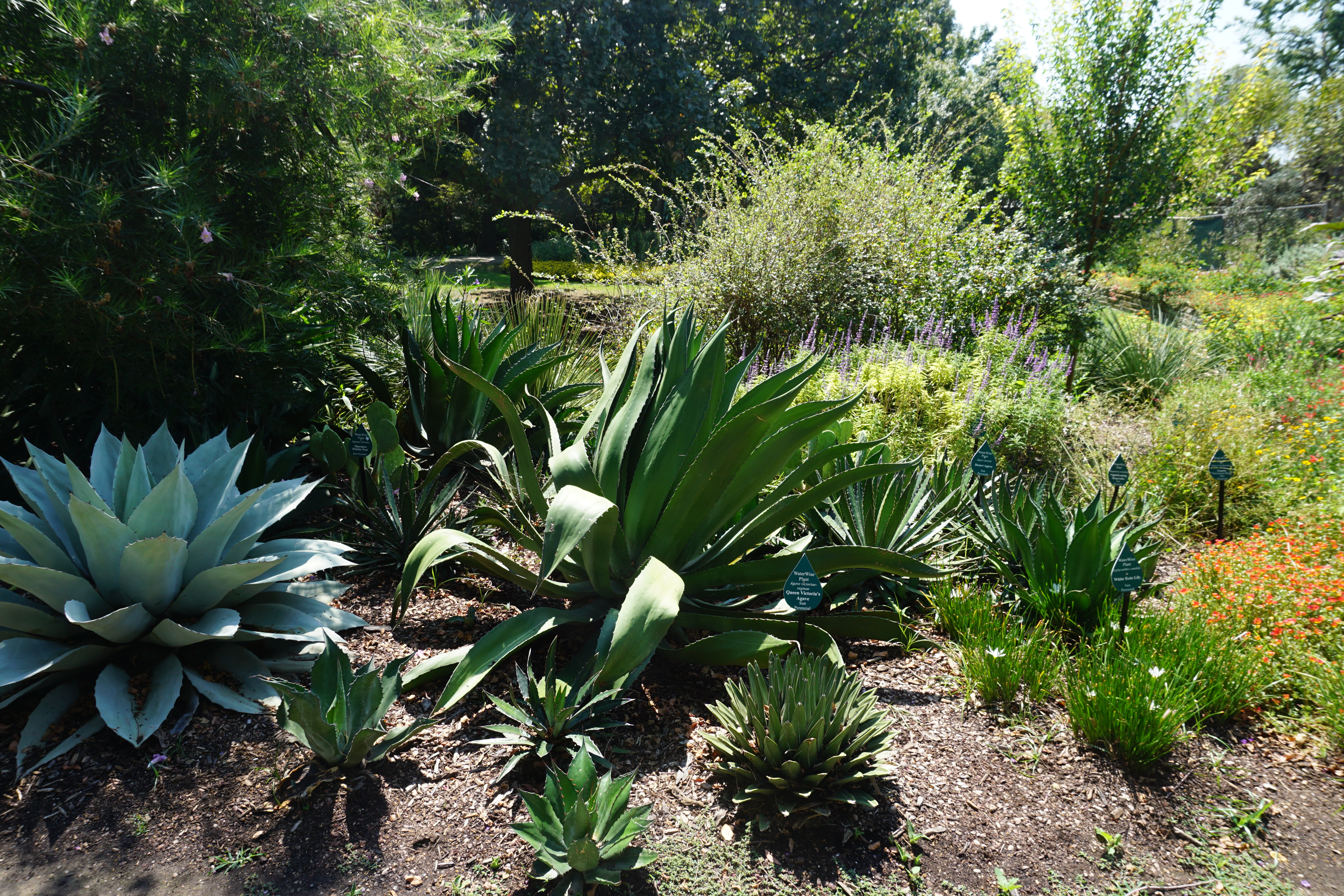
Xeriscaping at the Dallas Arboretum and Botanical Garden

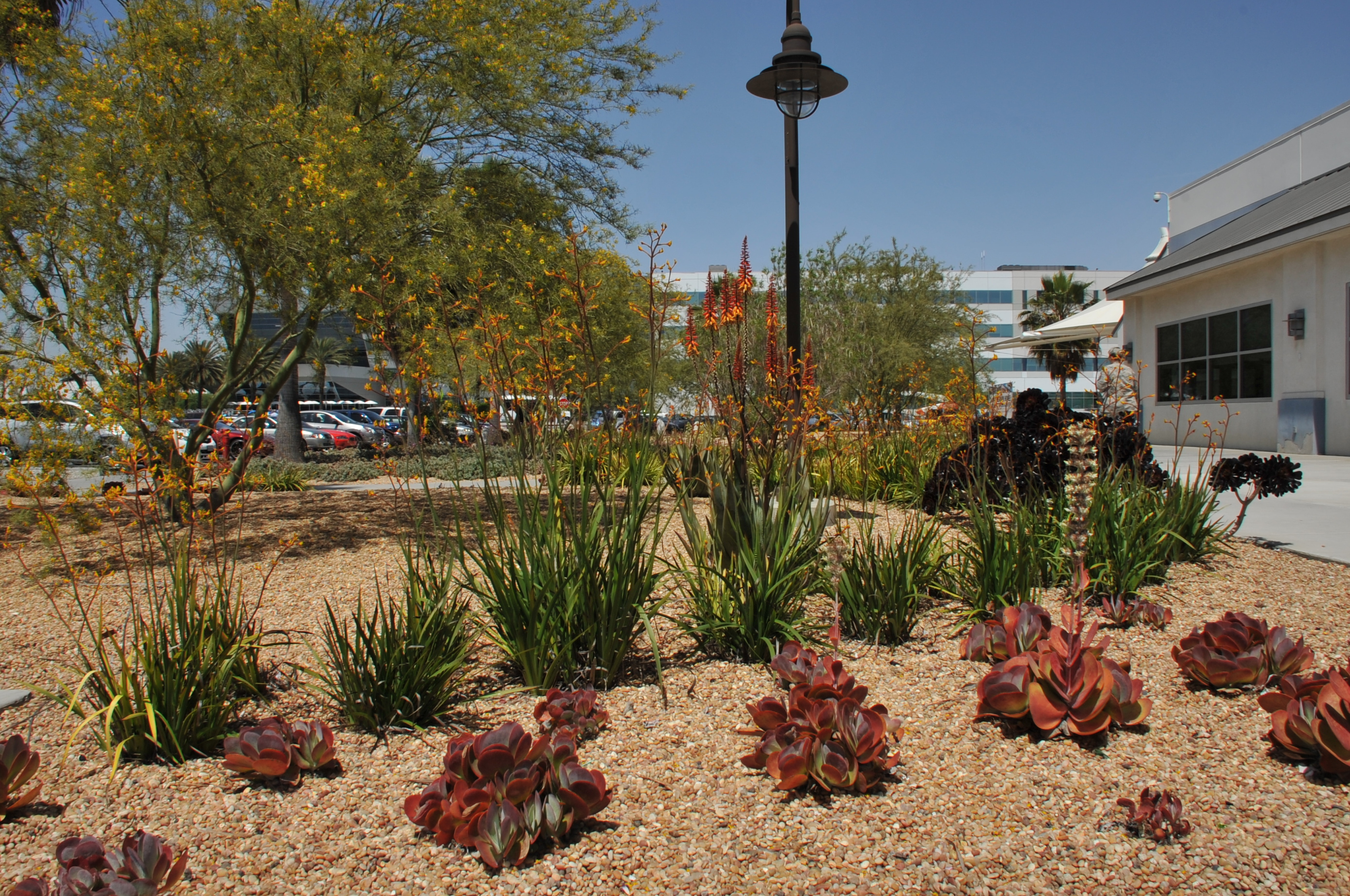
Los Angeles Air Force Base

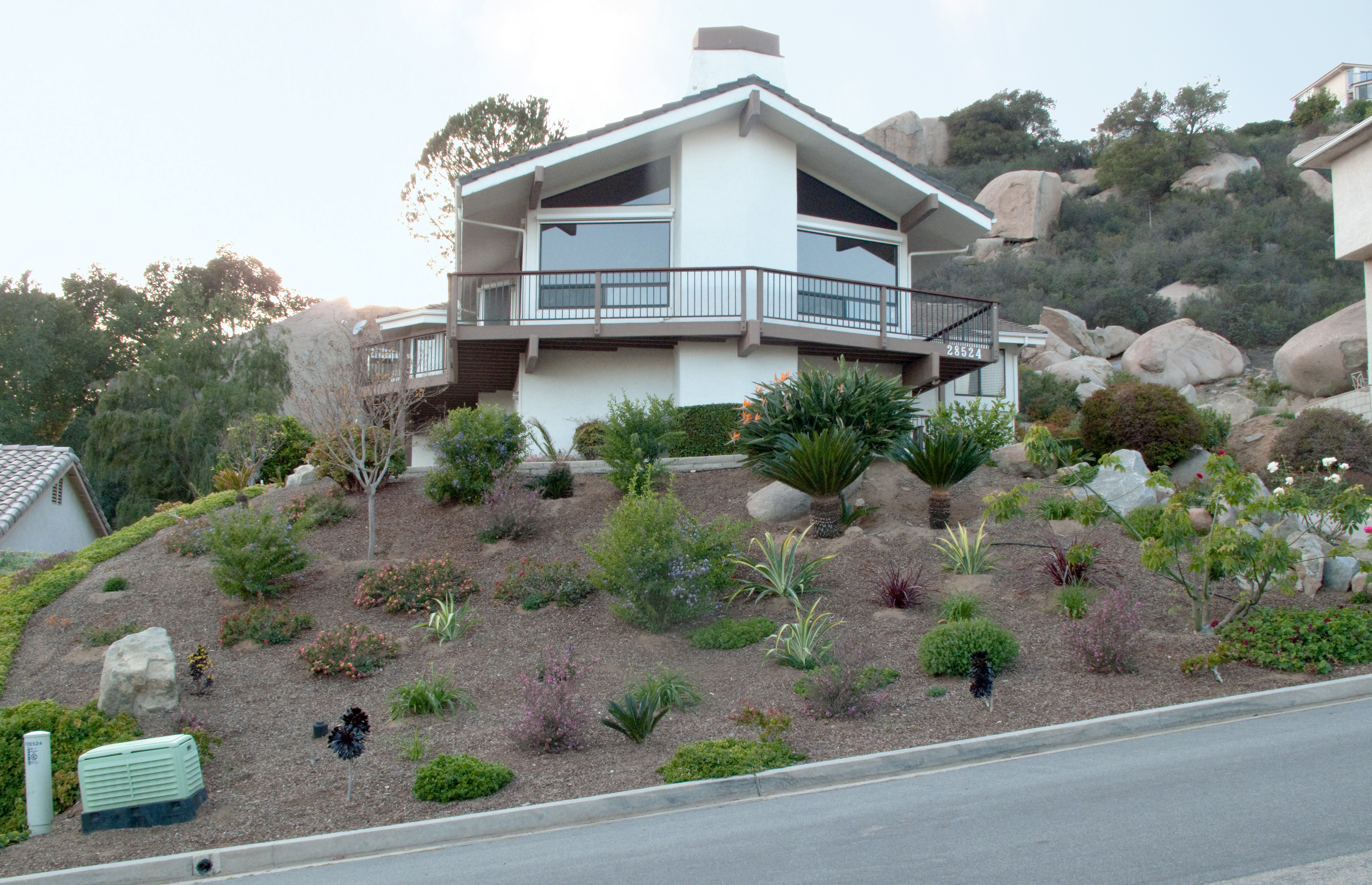
Xeriscaping in Hidden Meadows, California

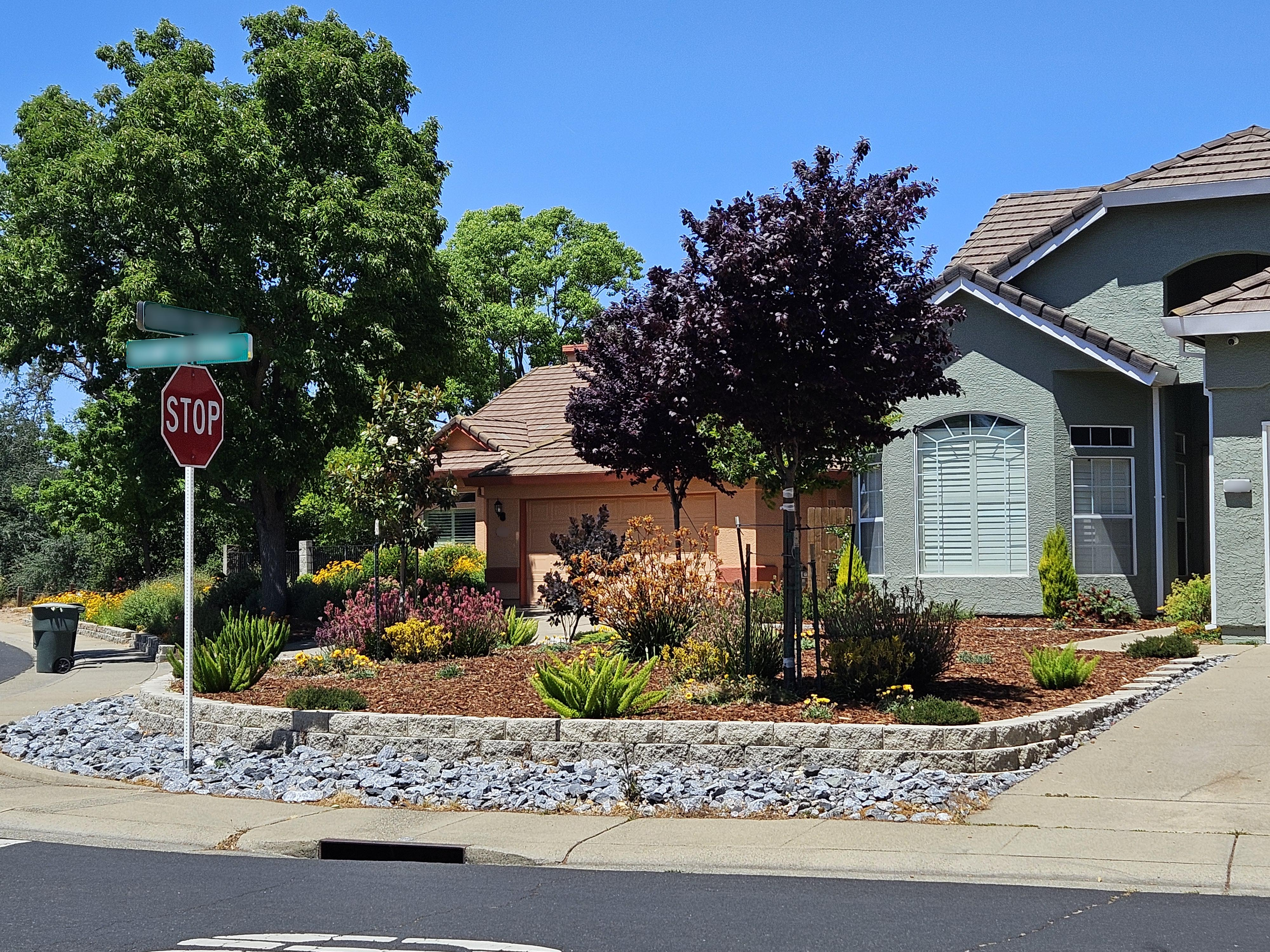
Example of xeriscaping in Roseville, California

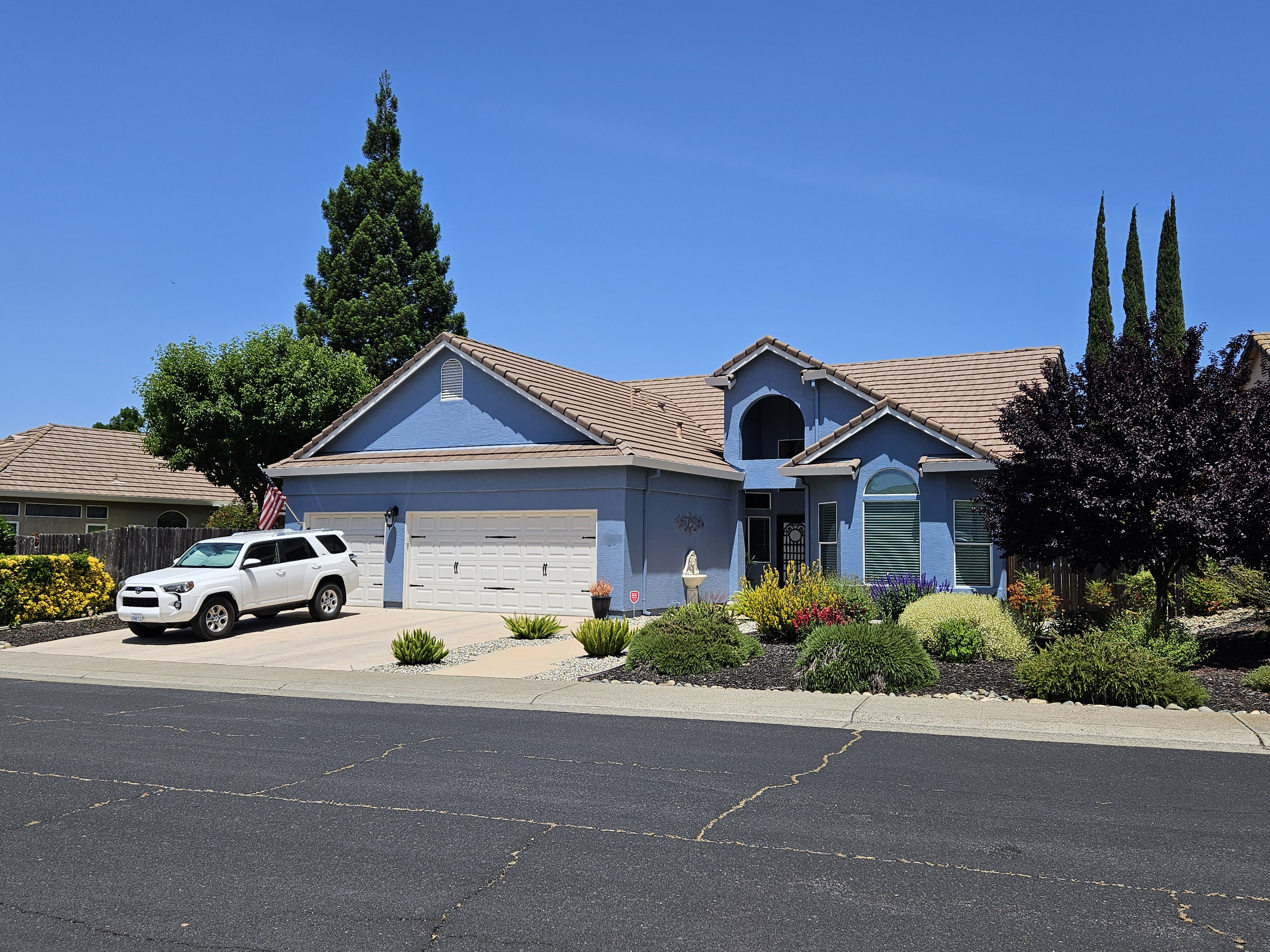
Example of xeriscaping in Roseville, California.

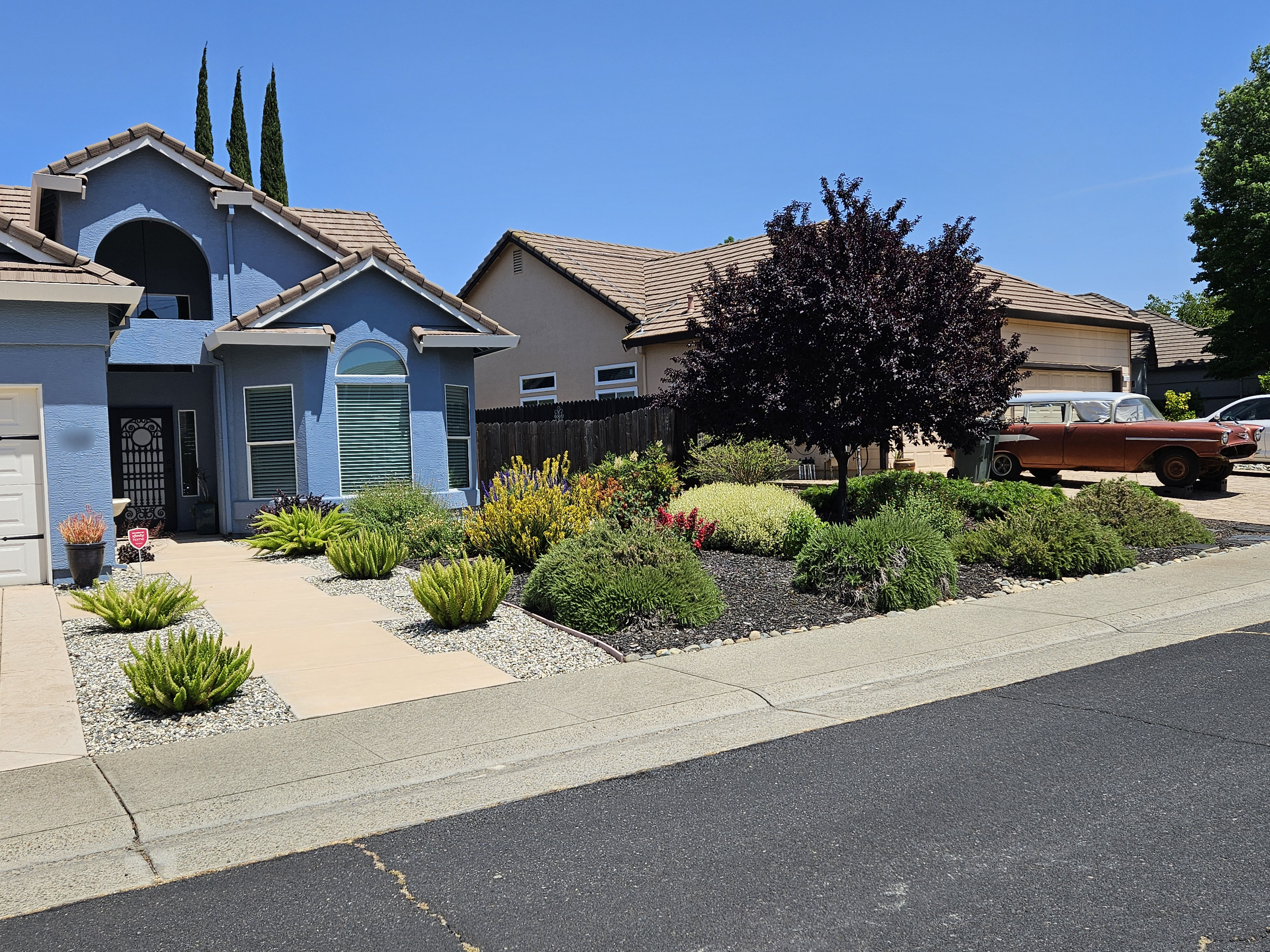
Example of xeriscaping in Roseville, California.

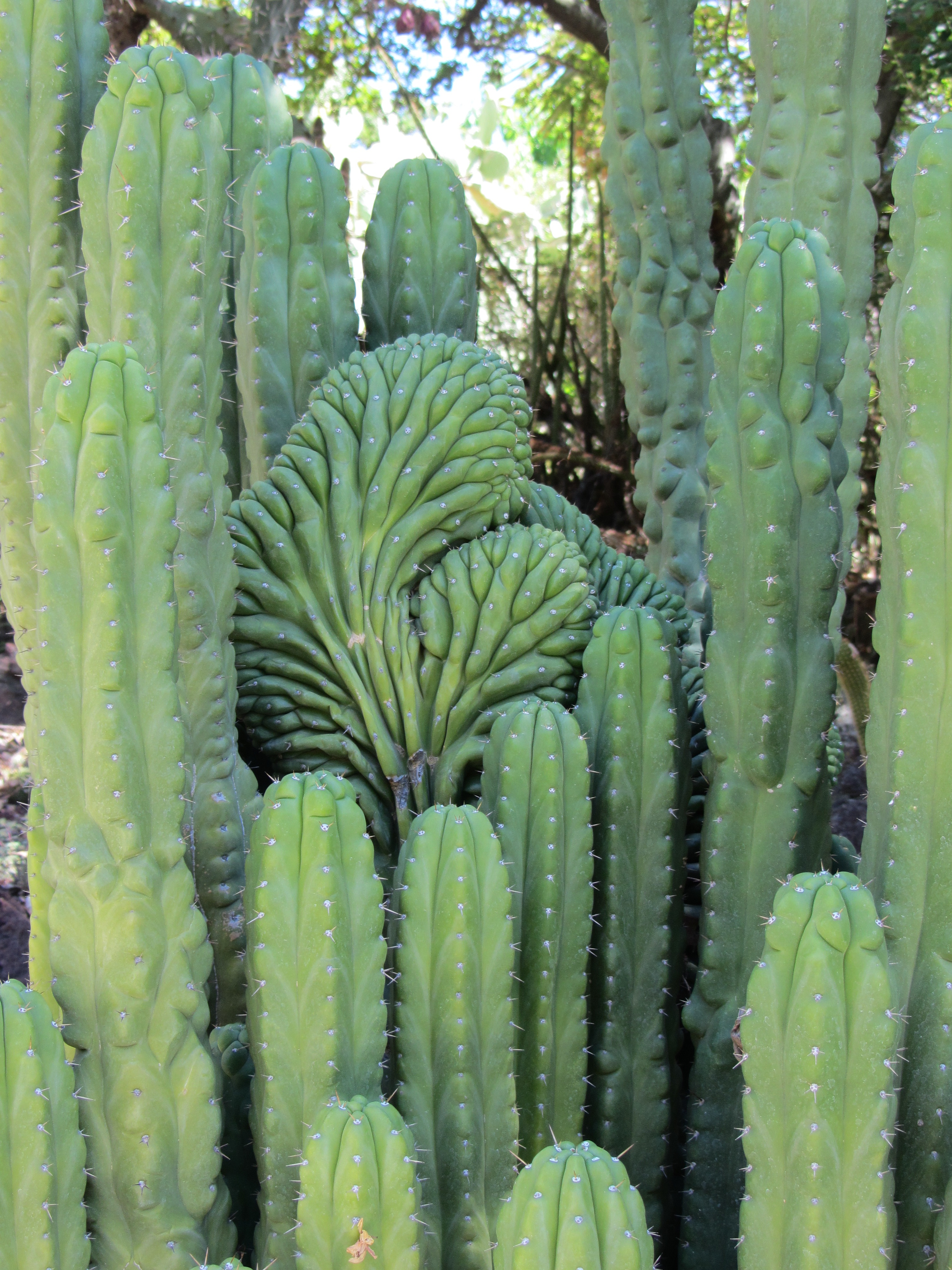
Echinopsis pachanoi

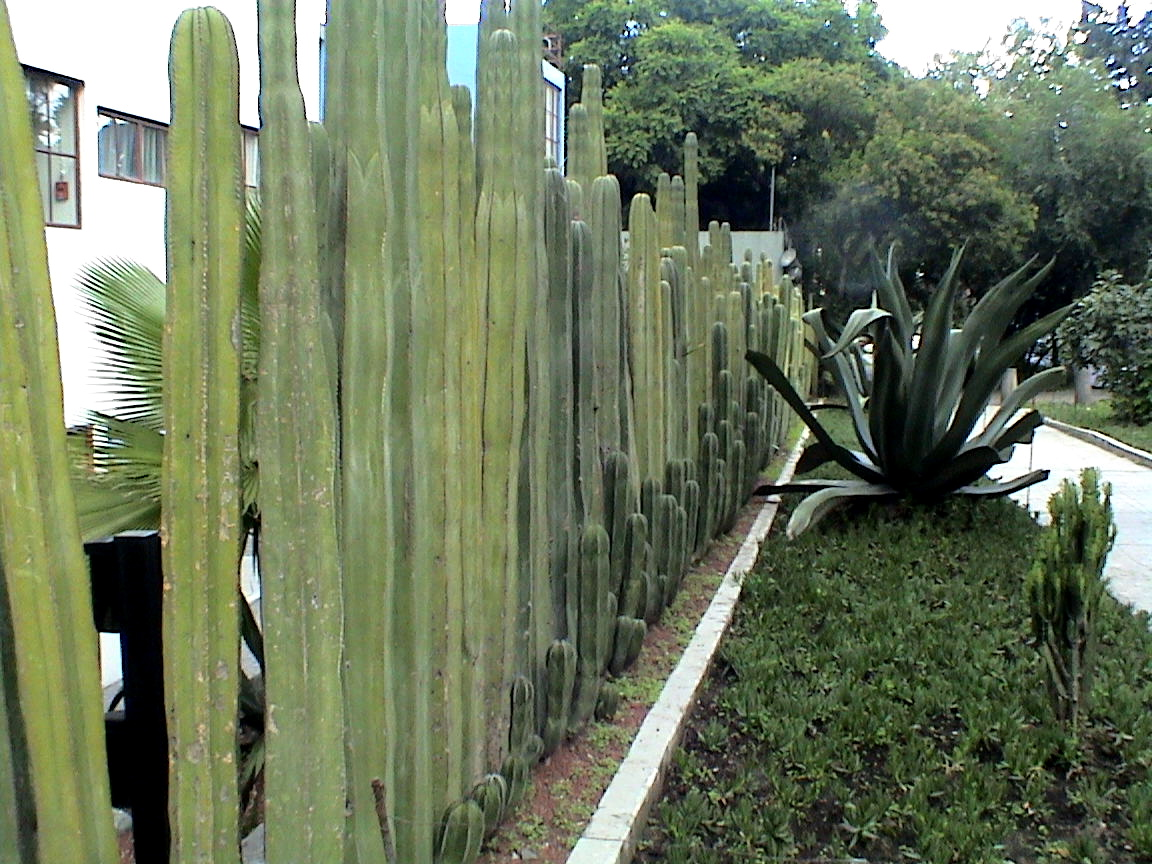
Cactus fence in Mexico

== See also ==
- Bioswale
- Climate-friendly gardening
- Dryland farming
- Echinopsis pachanoi - A fast-growing columnar cactus commonly used in xeriscaping.
- Foodscaping
- Gardening
- Green roof
- International Center for Agricultural Research in the Dry Areas
- Masanobu Fukuoka
- Native plant
- Natural landscaping
- Rainwater harvesting
- Roof garden
- Sustainable farming
- Sustainable gardening
- Sustainable landscape architecture
- Sustainable landscaping
- Wildlife garden
