= Neighborhood Nine =

Neighborhood of Cambridge, Massachusetts

Neighborhood Nine Peabody Area 9
- Neighborhood
- Location within Greater Boston area Location within Massachusetts Location within the United States
- Coordinates: 42°23′2″N 71°7′45″W
- Country: United States
- State: Massachusetts
- County: Middlesex
- City: Cambridge
- ZIP Code: 02138, 02140
- Area code: 617

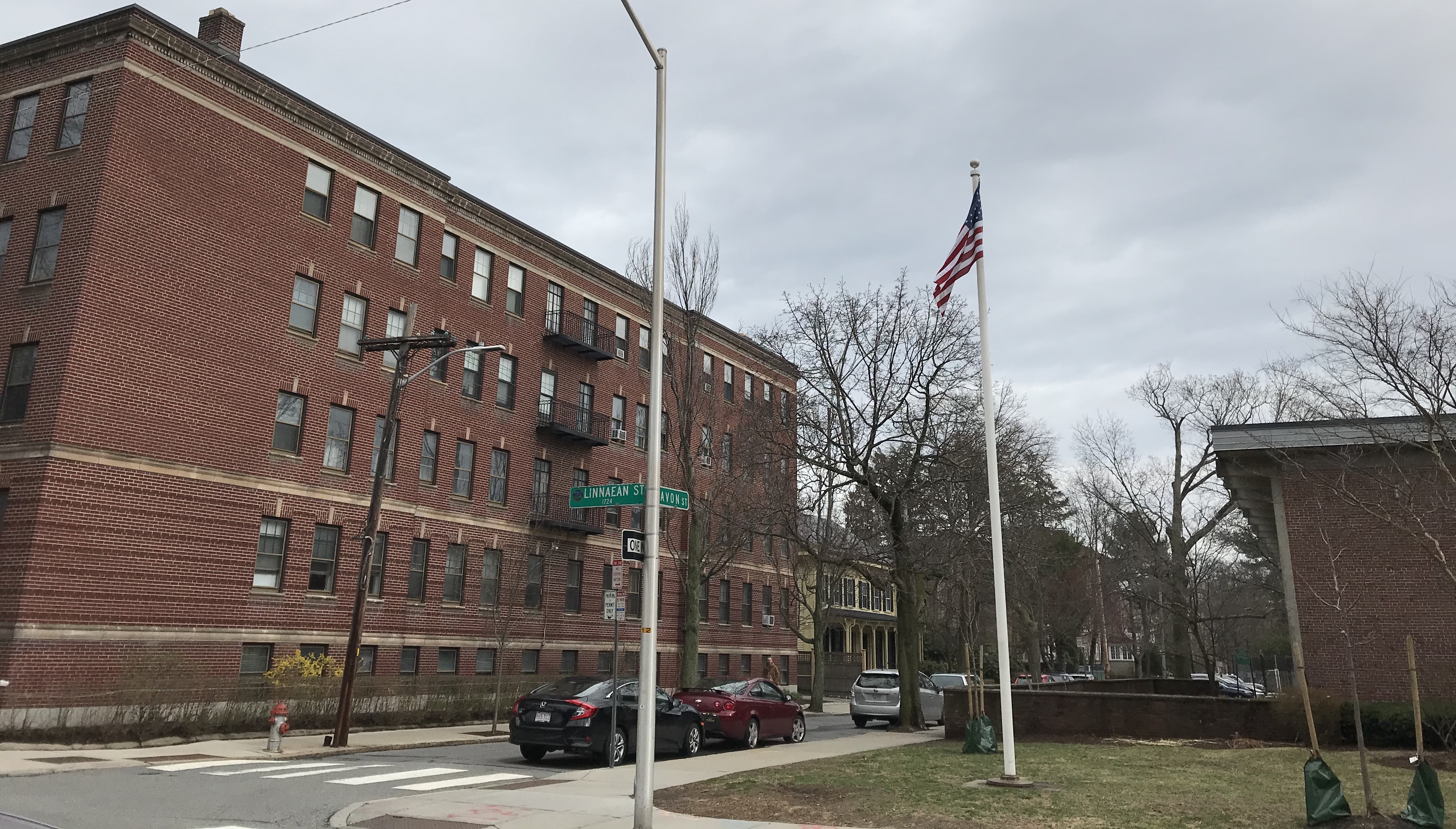
The intersection of Avon St and Linnaean St, seen in 2020

Neighborhood Nine, also known as Peabody or Area 9, is a neighborhood of Cambridge, Massachusetts, U.S. It is mostly residential.

== History ==
Much of the Cambridge Common used to extend into what is now Neighborhood Nine in the 17th century, which used to be a great forest. (The common was later enclosed and made a park in 1828, despite protests from the citizens of nearby Watertown and Arlington.) The neighborhood began to attract wealthy settlers in the colonial era as Harvard College was established; later, in the 19th century, it further attracted immigrant populations of Irish Americans.

By the 20th century, the neighborhood was almost fully built up. Later on, the neighborhood's clay pits were turned into the city's dumpster, and after that into Danehy Park. Also, some mixed-income apartments were built.

== Geography ==
Neighborhood Nine is bounded by Concord Avenue to the southwest, Massachusetts Avenue to the east, and through an imaginary line passing just short of Porter Square and Alewife Brook Parkway to the north. Garden St is a long street through the neighborhood; somewhat shorter streets include Sherman St, Raymond St, Linnaean St, and Upland Rd.

== Demographics ==
As of 2023, the neighborhood is home to 12,937 people (up from 11,794 people as of the 2000 census, and 11,126 people as of the 1990 census), making it the city's most populated neighborhood. Of these, 63% are white, 11% are black, 13% are Asian, and 12.1% are "Mixed/Other". Also, 27.7% of them speak a language other than English at home (up from 23% as of the 2000 census). Moreover, as of the 2000 census, 23% of the neighborhood's residents were born abroad, and almost exactly half of them are immigrant families.

== Attractions ==
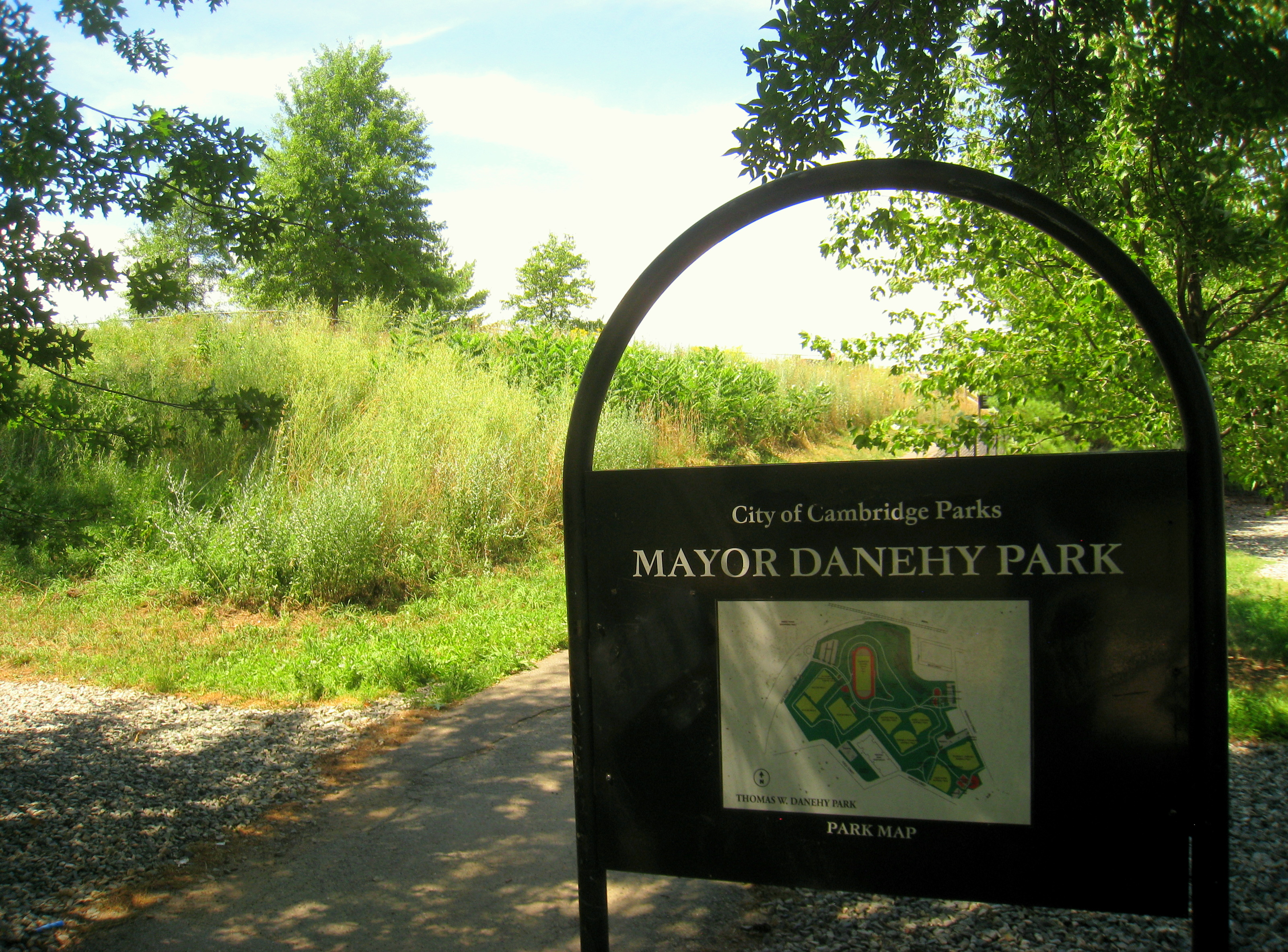
Danehy Park in 2010

Notable attractions in Neighborhood Nine include:

- the Cambridge Common (close to Harvard Square),
- the Graham and Parks School,
- and Danehy Park.

There are also a few stores and restaurants in the neighborhood.

Elizabeth Warren lives in the neighborhood at 24 Linnaean St, a house which she and her husband Bruce H. Mann had bought back in September 1995. On November 19, 2023, there was a protest calling for a ceasefire in the Gaza war outside her house; it's unknown whether she was inside at the time.
