= Greene-Rose Heritage Park =

Park in Cambridge, Massachusetts, United States

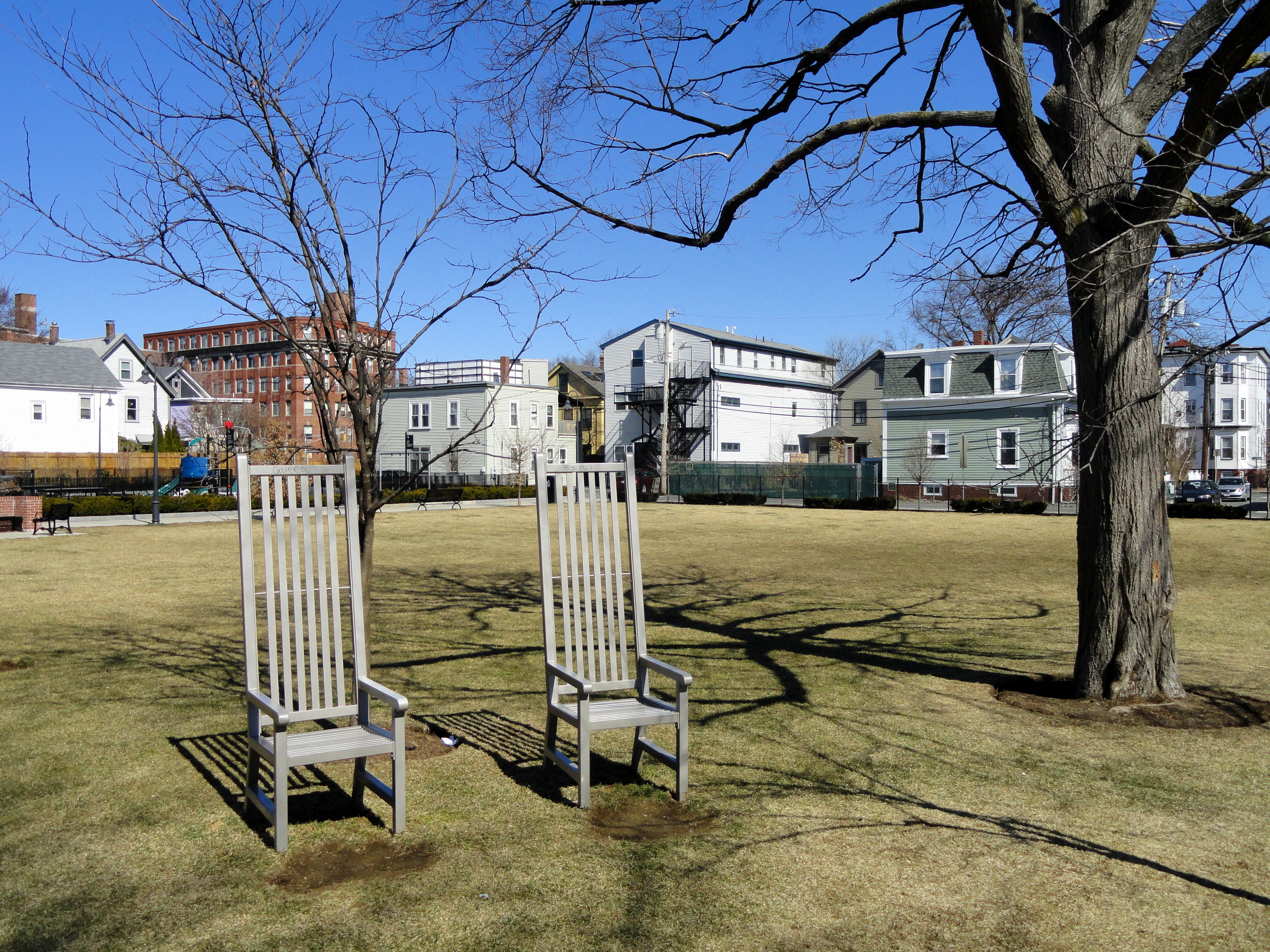
- The park in 2011
- Interactive map of Greene-Rose Heritage Park
- Type: Heritage Park
- Nearest city: Cambridge, Massachusetts
- Coordinates: 42.36611°N 71.09475°W
- Created: 2008

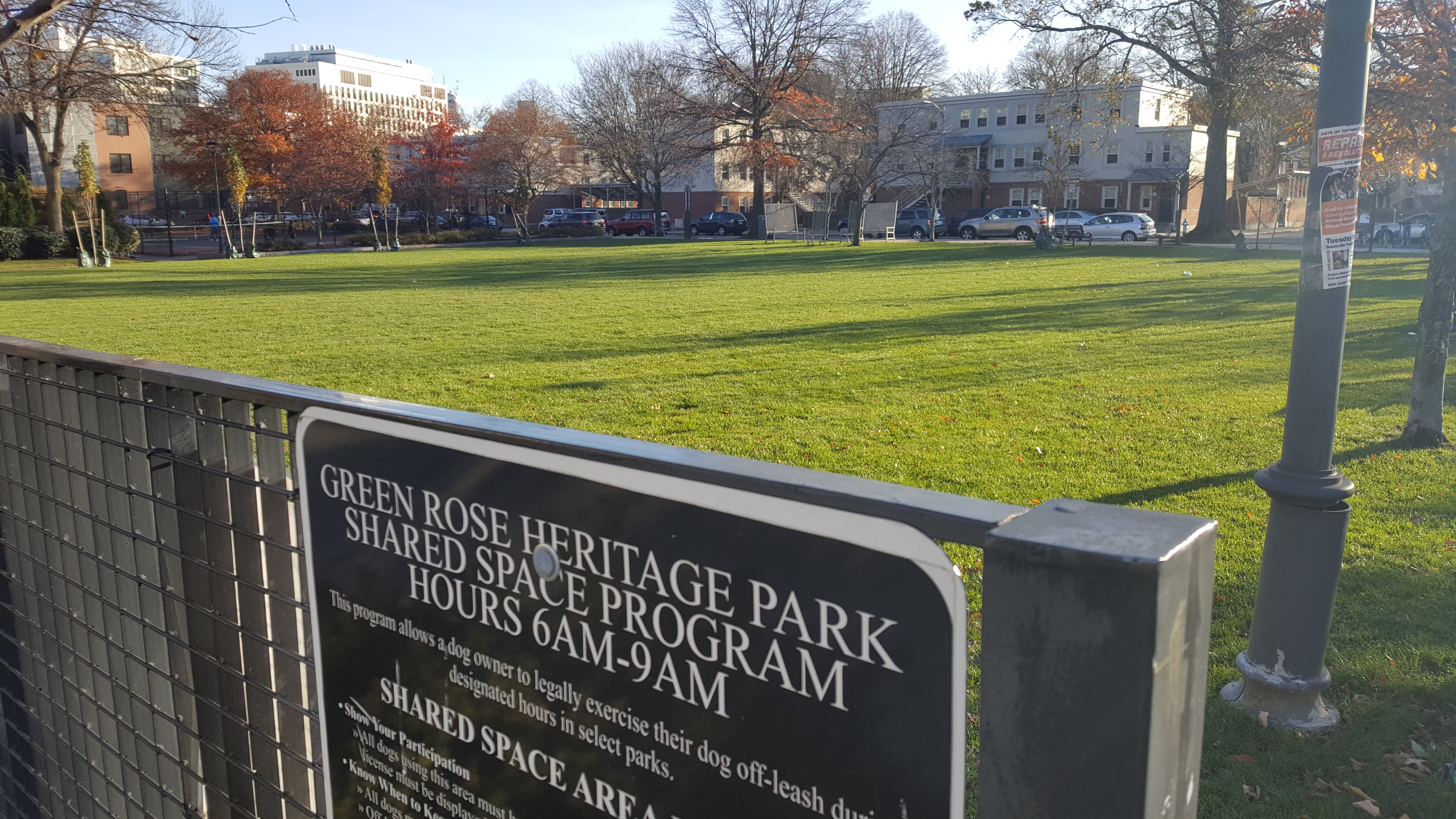
Park signage, 2019

Greene-Rose Heritage Park is a park in Cambridge, Massachusetts, United States. Opened in 2008, the park is located along Harvard Street, near the intersection with Moore Street. It has a playground and tennis courts.

It is the location of Cambridge's second Miyawaki forest, planted in November 2022.
