= Pocket forest =

Small group of locally native tree species

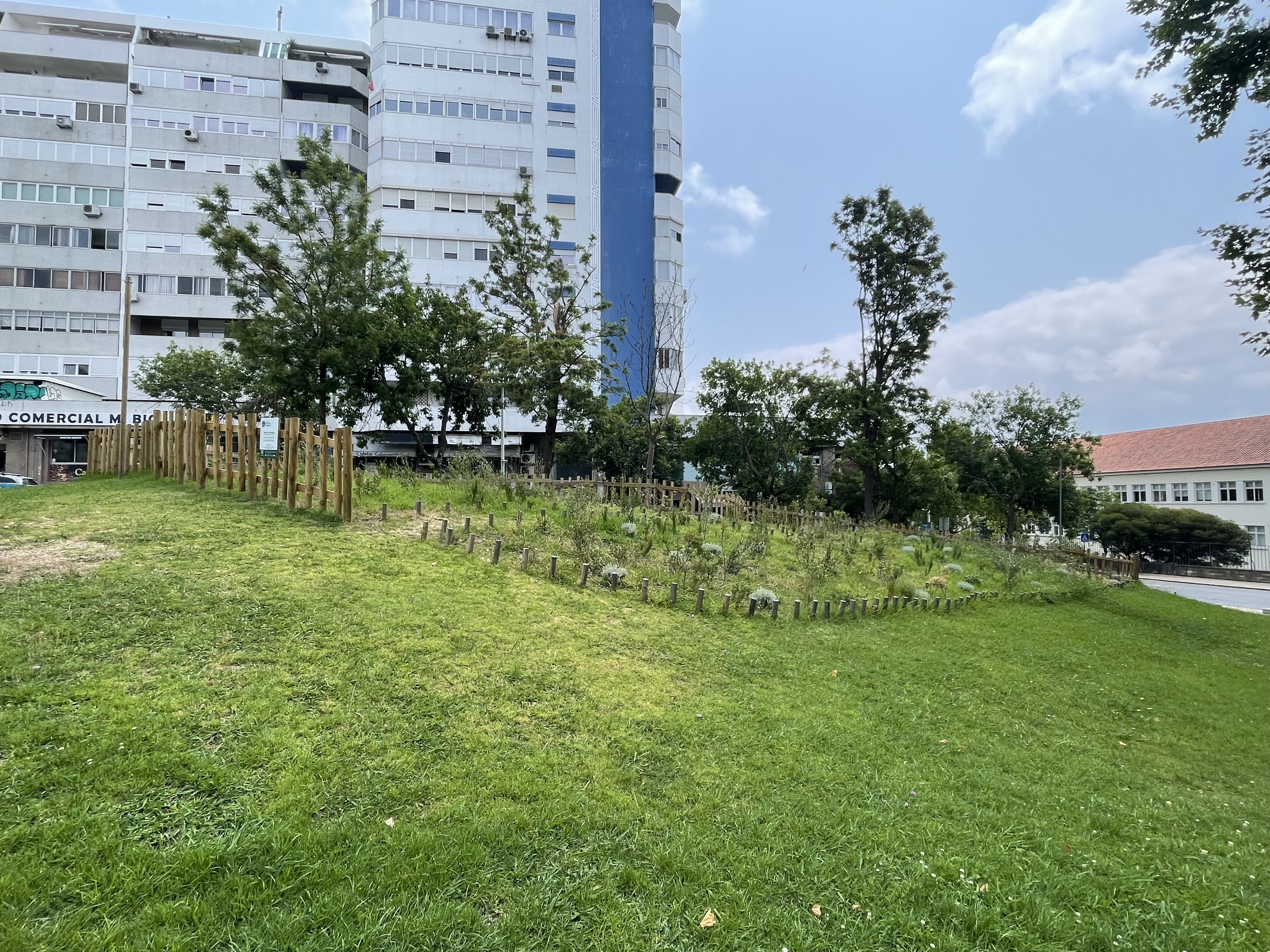
A pocket forest in progress in Almada, Portugal

A pocket forest is created by planting various native trees and shrubs in close proximity, generally as a means of rapidly restoring native plant species in damaged ecosystems. While forests naturally grow through a primary stage and then a secondary stage before reaching their climax stage, pocket forests are created by a dense planting of climax stage species which grow rapidly in competition for sunlight.

Pocket forests have been embraced by environmentalists as a means of reforesting urban spaces and teaching urban residents about native forest environments. The growing interest in pocket forests was inspired in large part by the work of Japanese botanist Akira Miyawaki, whose "Miyawaki forests" have influenced the development of a variety of pocket forest methodologies adapted to different climates and spatial constraints.

== Methods ==
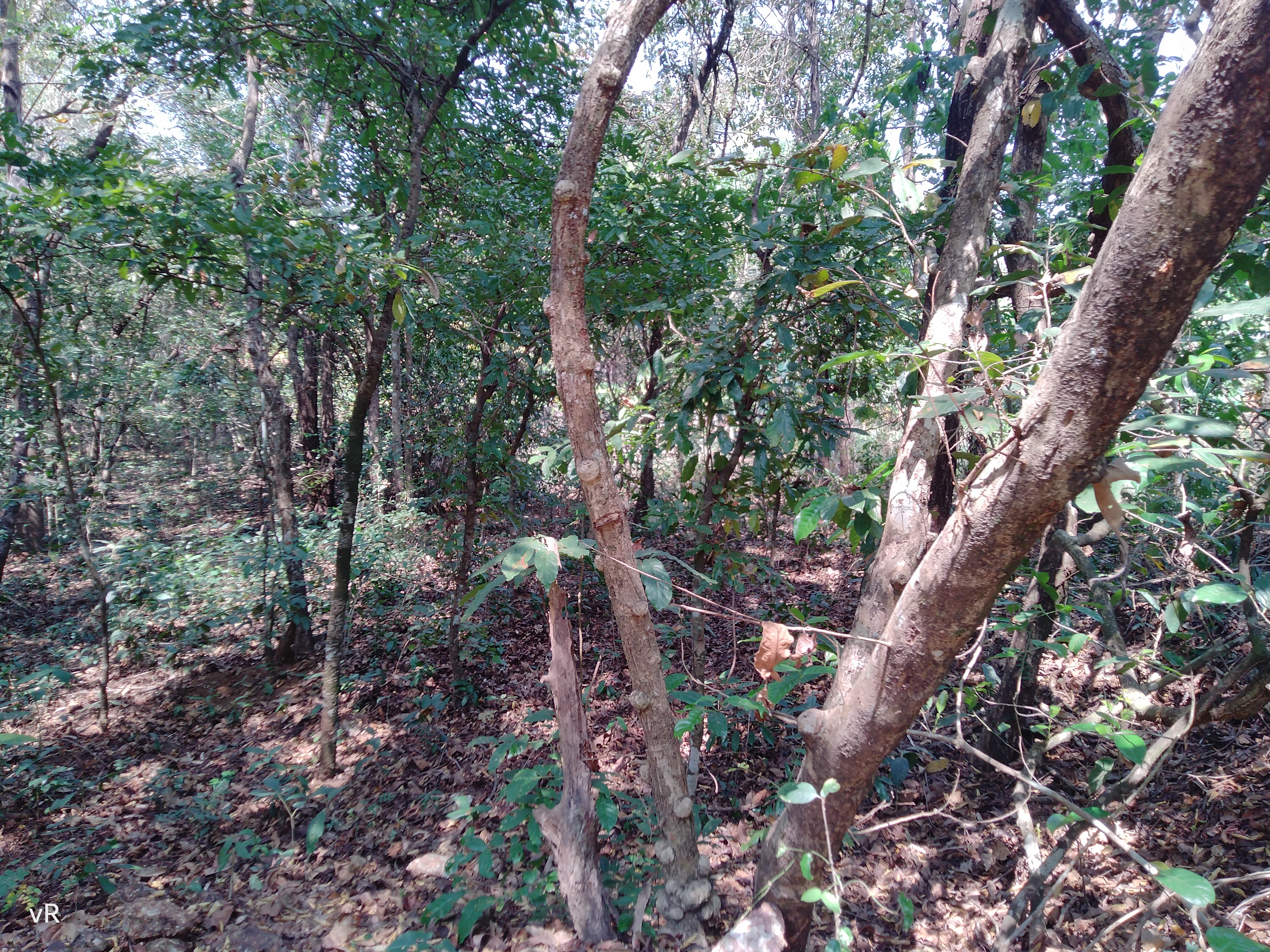
A Pocket Forest made at Parappa, Kerala, India

A variety of protocols for site preparation and planting have been developed, all sharing the same underlying principles as the Miyawaki method. The following is an example methodology:

The area to be planted is first covered with a layer of cardboard which is then covered with 3–6 in (7.6–15.2 cm) of compost or wood chips and allowed to acclimate to local moisture conditions for several months. The covered area is then planted with year-old plant nursery saplings spaced approximately 2 ft (0.6 m) apart. The entire surface area should be planted at the same time with a variety of native species so no saplings of the same species are adjacent to each other. Watering is unnecessary for native plants acclimated to the local environment; although watering for the first few years after planting, and during drought periods, will reduce mortality of individual plants. Pocket forests planted with greater density than commercial timberland utilize edge lighting in addition to overhead lighting to grow faster while absorbing more carbon dioxide per acre.

Three is the minimum number of different species of nursery saplings for planting a pocket forest. The arrangement below of species A, B and C illustrates avoidance of planting the same species in adjacent positions.

  A   B   C   A
B   C   A   B   C
  A   B   C   A

== Examples ==
- Pocket Forests CLG assists creation of pocket forests of 6–50 m^{2} (65–538 sq ft) within urban areas of Ireland.
- The Yakama Nation has planted seven pocket forests of 47 species totaling 23,000 ft^{2} (2,100 m^{2}) on their corrections and rehabilitation facility.
- A Miyawaki forest has been planted over a landfill in Cambridge, Massachusetts, as part of Danehy Park.
- A 1,000 ft^{2} (93 m^{2}) forest has been planted as part of Griffith Park in Los Angeles.
- Several Miyawaki forests have been planted in Berkeley, California.
- A 770 m^{2} (8,300 sq ft) pocket forest of 20 species is being planted in the City of Brussels.
- The town of Ayer, Massachusetts, organized community volunteers to plant a pocket forest.

== Criticism, problems and limitations ==
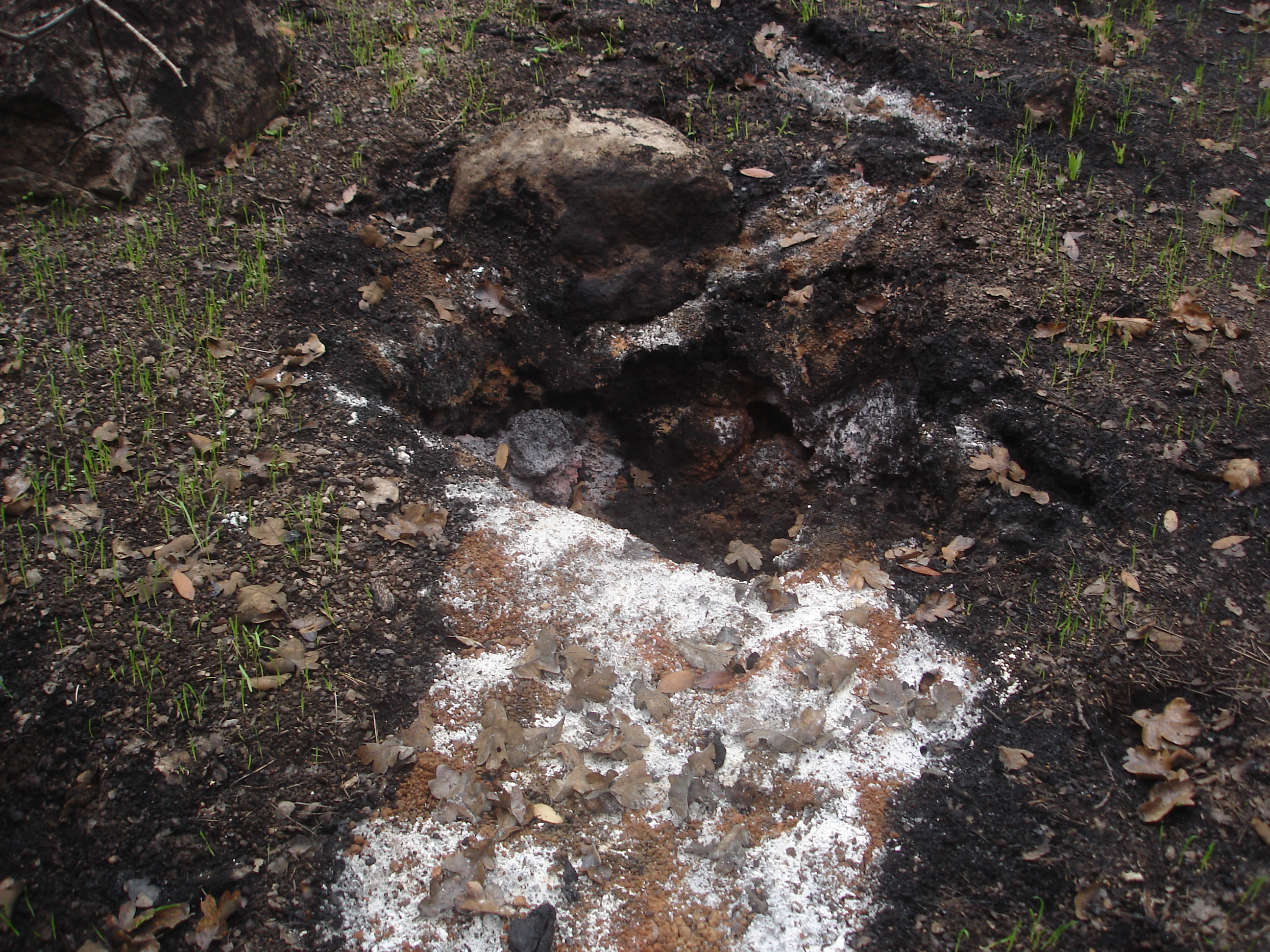
Fire ecosystem comparison of heat-sterilized soil under white ashes from coals of burning wood, while underground plant structures like grass rhizomes have survived and sprouted beneath the lighter fuel concentration of adjacent burnt duff.

Forestry scholars have noted that in the 2020s unsubstantiated claims of Miyawaki forest growing ten times as fast as other reforestation techniques have become common in social media and websites. This claim could be conflating documented faster ecological successions with over-all growth rates.

The indiscriminate promotion of the Miyawaki method has also been criticized for failing to take into account site-specific characteristics such a local climate and soil. The Miyawaki forest method is regarded as high-cost being particularly cost-inefficient in Mediterranean climate areas where maintenance require expensive water resources and some plants may suffer from photoinhibition. The Miyawaki technique is regarded as unfeasible for large areas. A Miyawaki forest may result in disorganized plant community with scant landscaping value and may in some cases encourage anti-social behaviour.

It has been accused that the Miyawaki method has been promoted for financial gain, sometimes as an effort to tap on corporate social responsibility funds.

Miyawaki developed the method as a means of replenishing forest soils by allowing dead leaves and twigs to decompose in a moist, wood-rotting ecosystem. This process may be less successful in drier fire ecosystems where nutrients are recycled as ashes. The dense pocket forest forms a capture mechanism for wind-blown embers, dried ground litter is an ignition source, and the multi-layered pocket forest forms a fuel ladder with wildfire risks in urban areas.

Miyawaki forest have been the matter of political controversy in Chile as in 2025 political authorities demanded to modify projected green areas in mediterranean climate Santiago to include Miyawaki forests. This request was denounced by opposition politician Ignacio Briones as "arbitrary and out of the law" and the issue was later discussed at the Environmental Commission of the Senate of Chile.

== Gallery ==
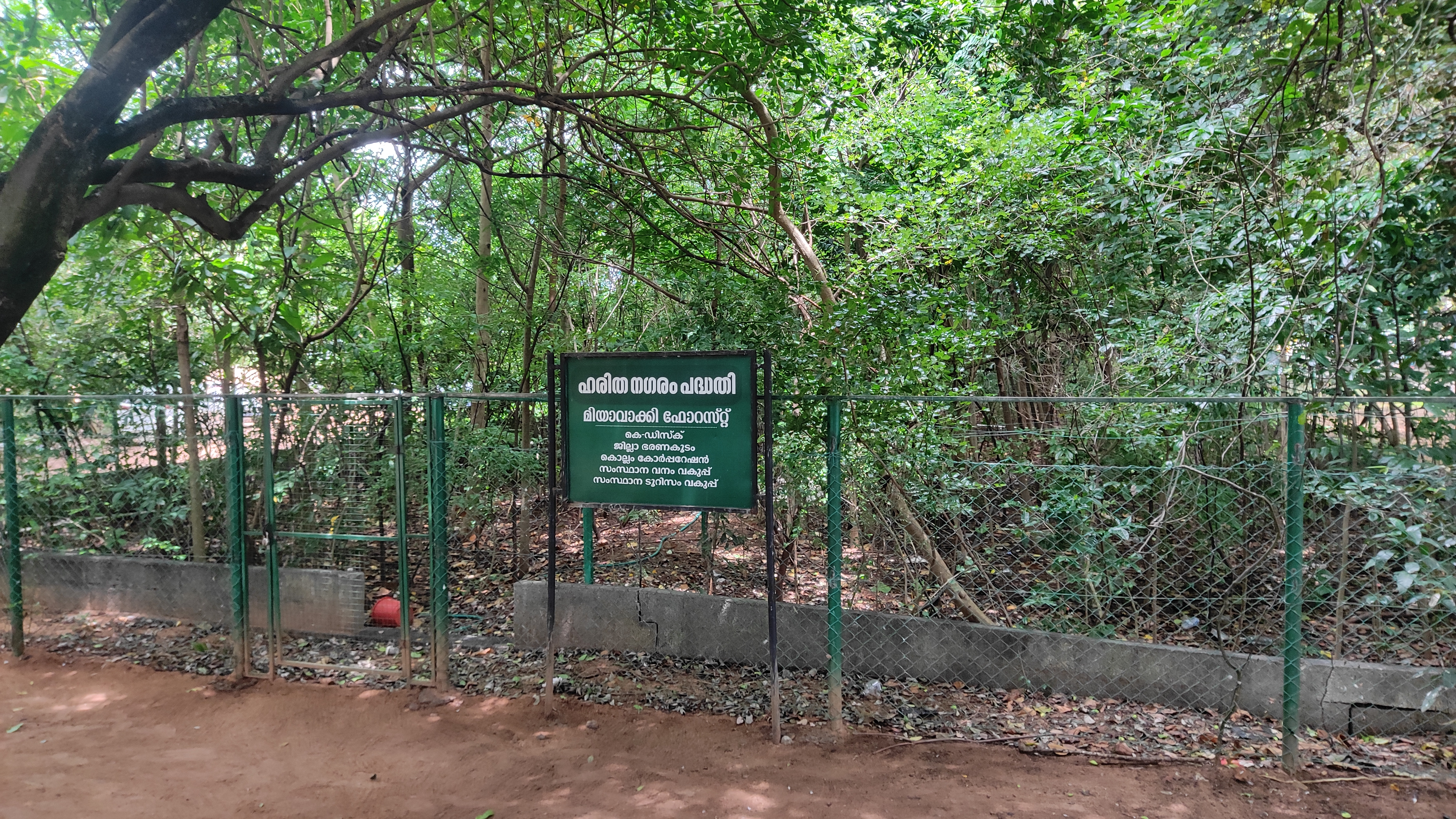
Asramam Miyawaki Forest in Kerala India

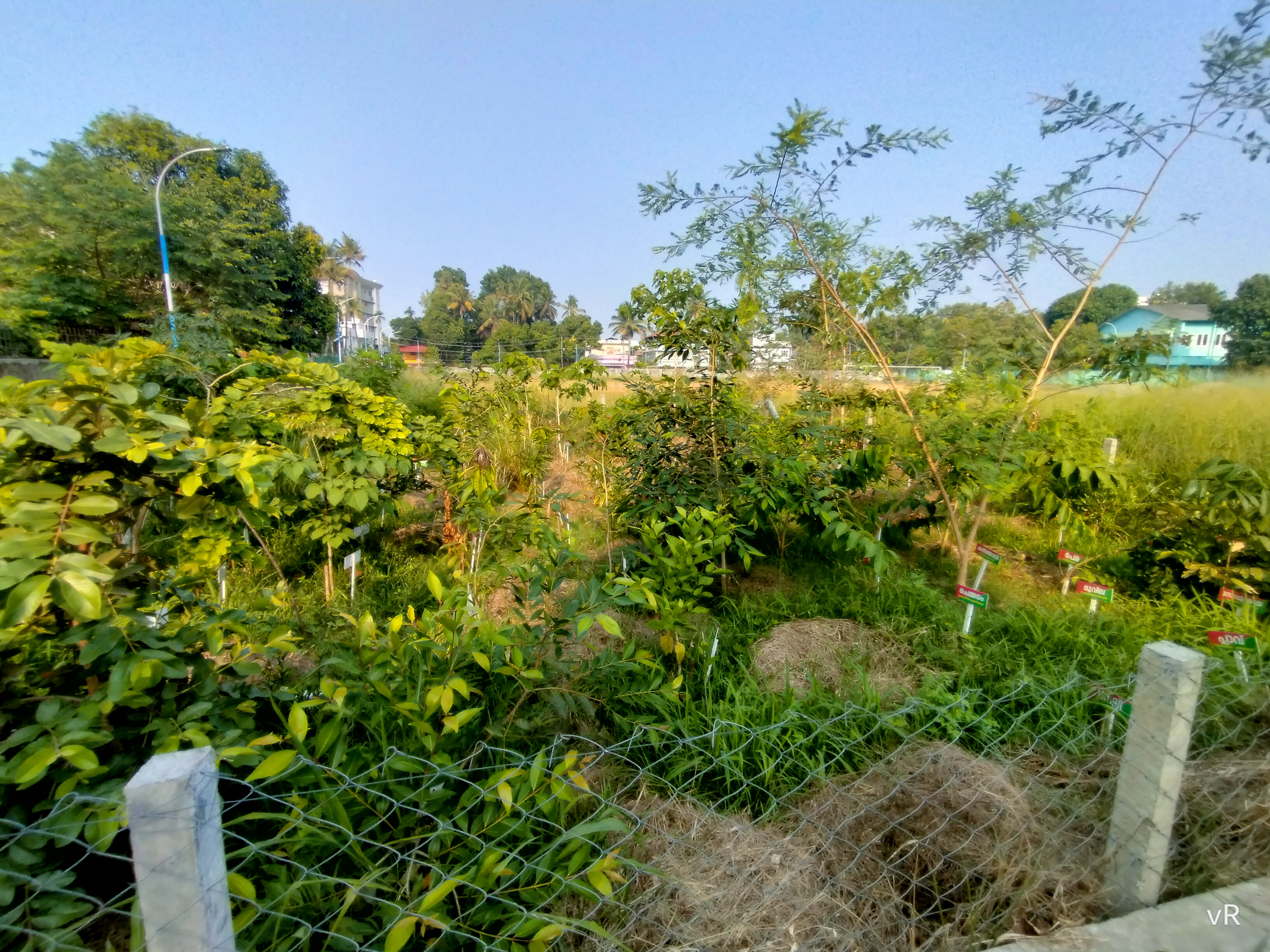

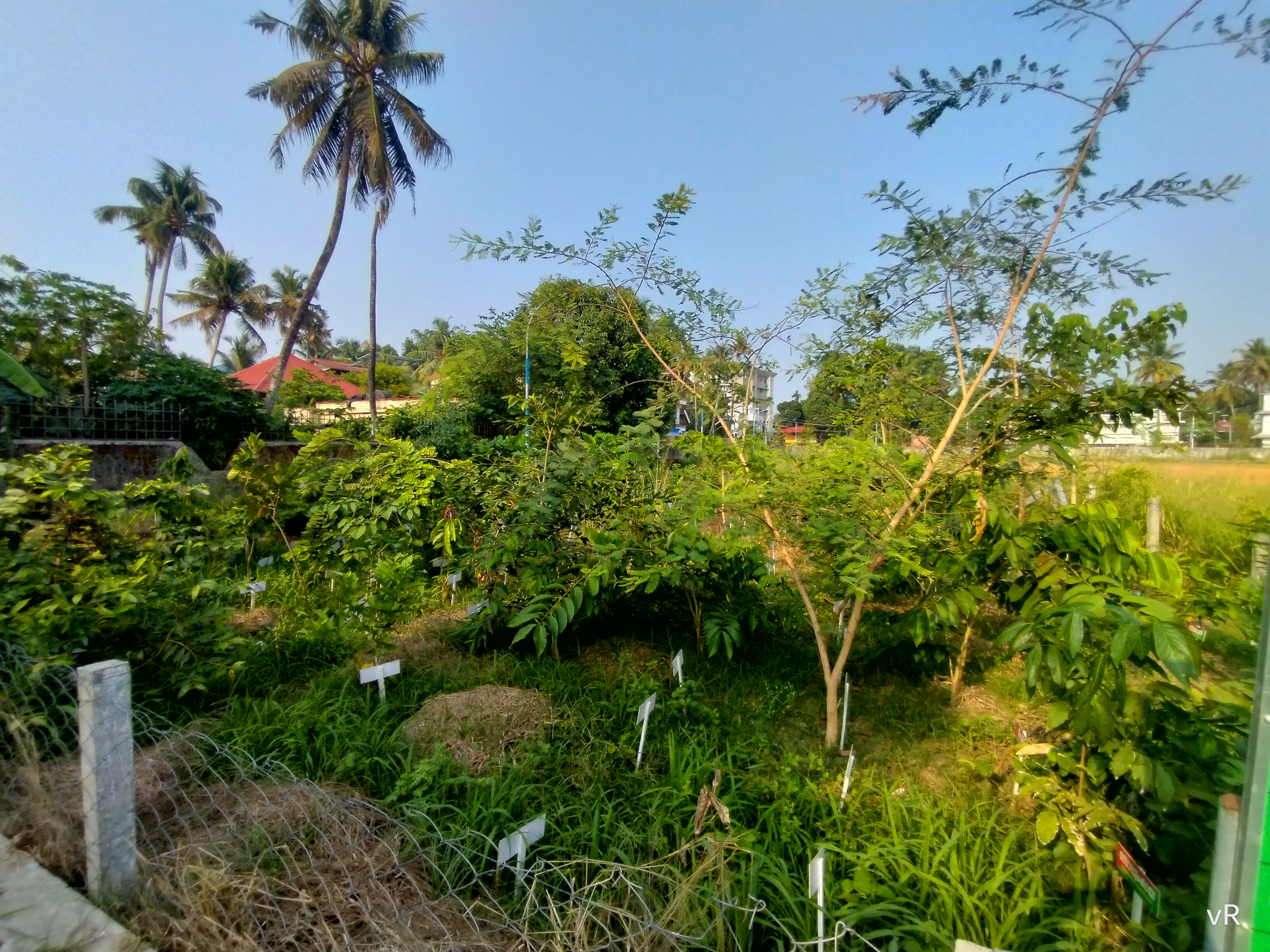

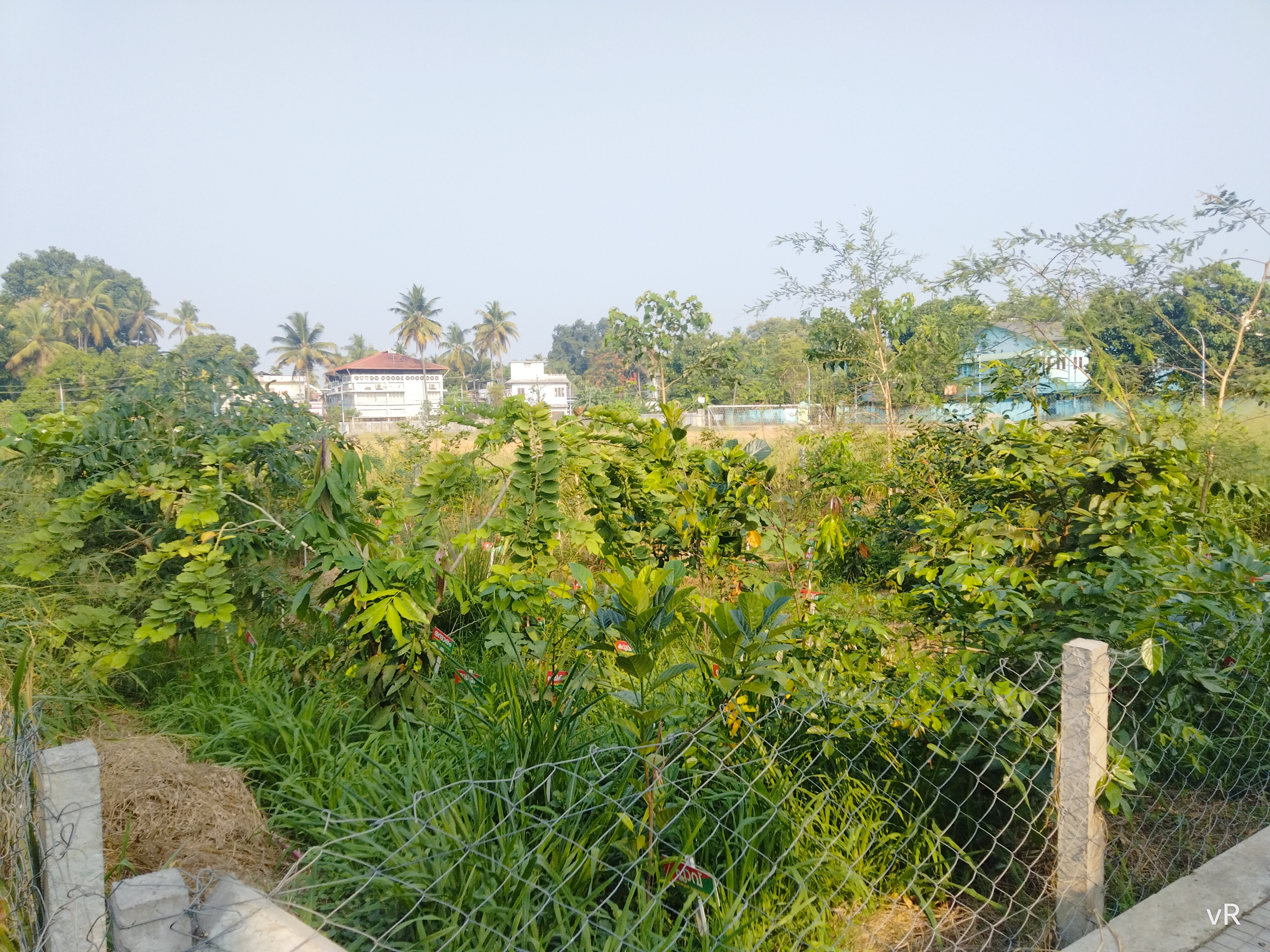

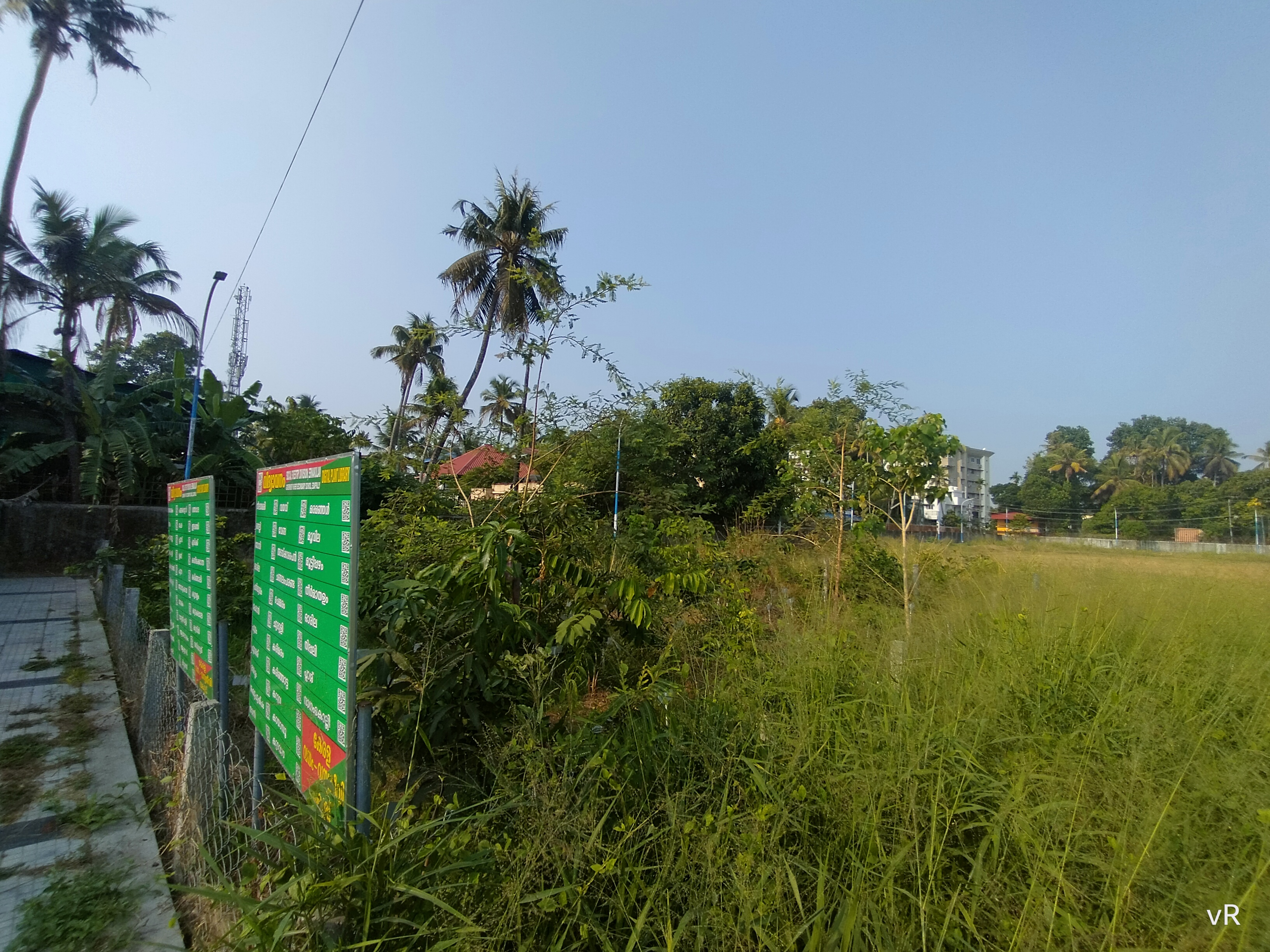

Miyawaki forest at Edappally, Eranakulam.
