= Akira Miyawaki =

Japanese botanist (1928–2021)

- 宮脇 昭
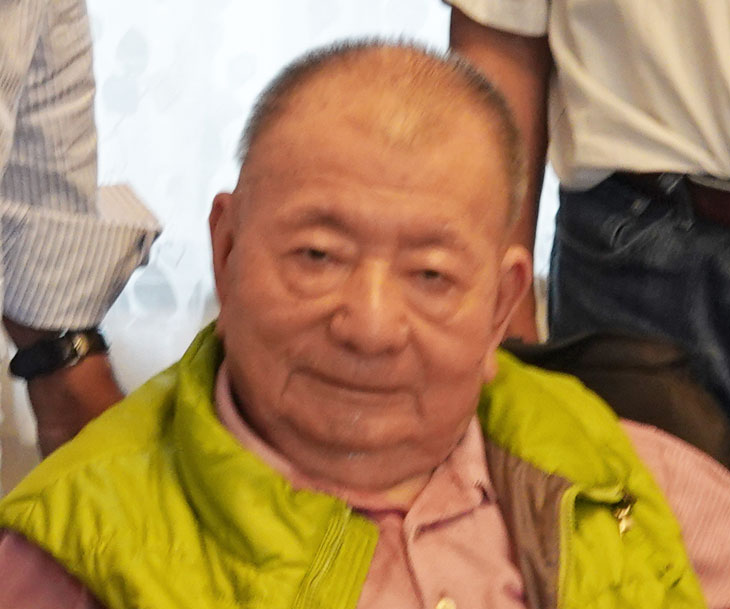
- Akira Miyawaki in 2019
- Born: 29 January 1928; Takahashi, Japan
- Died: 16 July 2021 (aged 93)
- Education: Hiroshima University
- Occupation: Botanist
- Known for: Miyawaki forest
- Awards: Asahi Prize (1990); Goldene Blume von Rheydt Prize, Germany (1990); Purple Ribbon Medal, Japanese Government (1992); Reinhold Tüxen Prize, Germany (1995); Nikkei Global Environmental Technology Awards (1996); Order of the Sacred Treasure, Gold and Silver Star, Japanese Government (2000); Japan Culture Life Award (2002); Distinguished Service Award, Ecological Society of Japan (2003); Blue Planet Prize (2006)

Akira Miyawaki (宮脇 昭, Miyawaki Akira; 29 January 1928 – 16 July 2021) was a Japanese botanist and an expert in plant ecology who specialized in seeds and natural forests. He was active worldwide as a specialist in natural vegetation restoration of degraded land. He was particularly known for his studies of reforestation using pocket forests, often called Miyawaki forests after him.

He was professor emeritus at Yokohama National University and director of the Japanese Center for International Studies in Ecology since 1993. He received the Blue Planet Prize in 2006.

== Thesis ==
Beginning in the 1970s, Miyawaki advocated for the restoration of natural forests. In 1992, he said he believed that the Earth Summit in Rio de Janeiro failed to emphasize the protection of native forests, most of which continued to decline.

Trees around a Shinto shrine in Sasayama, Hyogo

Miyawaki observed trees that traditionally grew around temples, shrines, and cemeteries in Japan, such as the Japanese blue oak, Castanopsis cuspidata, bamboo-leaf oak, Japanese chestnut trees, and Machilus thunbergii. He believed that they were relicts of the primary forest. Meanwhile, he noted that trees such as Japanese cedar, cypress and larch pine, supposedly native to Japan, had been introduced into Japan over centuries by foresters to produce timber. Miyawaki reflected on the consequences of the change in composition and structure of most Japanese forests, most of which do not contain solely their original natural vegetation.

He calculated that only 0.06% of contemporary Japanese forests were indigenous forests. Contemporary forests, created according to forestry principles, in his opinion, are neither the most suitable candidates to address climate change nor the most resilient vegetation for the geo-bioclimatic conditions of Japan.

Using the concept of potential natural vegetation, Miyawaki developed, tested, and refined a method of ecological engineering today known as the Miyawaki method to restore native forests from seeds of native trees on very degraded soils that were deforested and without humus. With the results of his experiments, he restored protective forests in over 1,300 sites in Japan and various tropical countries, in particular in the Pacific region in the form of shelterbelts, woodlands, and woodlots, including urban, port, and industrial areas. Miyawaki demonstrated that rapid restoration of forest cover and soil was possible by using a selection of pioneer and secondary indigenous species that were densely planted and provided with mycorrhiza.

Miyawaki studied local plant ecology and used species that have key and complementary roles in the normal tree community.

== Curriculum ==
Miyawaki was primarily a botanist who specialized in plant ecology and seeds, who wrote a thesis on the subject in the Department of Biology at the University of Hiroshima. He conducted field research in various parts of Japan while working as a research assistant at the Yokohama National University, and continued his studies at the University of Tokyo.

Reinhold Tüxen (1899–1980), who headed the Federal Institute for Vegetation Mapping, invited him to Germany. Miyawaki worked with him on potential natural vegetation from 1956 to 1958.

Miyawaki returned to Japan in 1960 and applied the methods of mapping potential natural vegetation. He found relicts of ancient forests still present in the vicinity of temples and shrines (surrounding sacred groves). He inventoried over 10,000 sites throughout Japan, and was able to identify potential flora affected by different types of human activity, including in mountainous areas, riverbanks, rural villages, and urban areas.

From the data collected, he created maps of existing vegetation and maps of potential natural vegetation. His maps are still used as a basis for scientific research and impact studies, and as a tool for land use, diagnosis and for mapping biological corridors. These maps of potential natural vegetation serve as a model to restore degraded habitats and native plant environments.

From 1980 to 1990, in cooperation with laboratories of phytoecology and universities, Miyawaki led botanical and phytosociological inventories to map vegetation throughout Japan, compiled into a ten-volume, 6,000-page study.

== First experiments ==
Miyawaki's first field trials showed that planted forests, which in composition and structure were closer to what would exist in the absence of human activity, grew quickly and generally showed good ecological resilience. He created a large seed bank (more than 10 million seeds have been identified and classified, according to their geographical origin and soil). The seeds are mostly from remnants of natural forests preserved for generations around temples and cemeteries because of the traditional belief in Chinju no Mori; it was considered unlucky to interfere with these forests. These places have allowed the preservation of thousands of small reserves of native species and tree genes descending from prehistoric forests.

Miyawaki used the principles of this tradition, and proposed a plan to restore native forests for environmental protection, water retention, and protection against natural hazards. His proposals were not initially met with positive feedback, but in the early 1970s, Nippon Steel Corporation, which wanted to plant forests on embankments around its steelworks at Oita, became interested in his work after the death of previous conventional plantations and entrusted him with a first operation.

Miyawaki identified the potential natural vegetation of the area, and studied the forests surrounding two nearby tombs (Usa and Yusuhara). He chose various species of trees that he tested on the substrate to be afforested, and created a nursery where plants were mixed and then planted on the site. The steel corporation was satisfied with the results, and planted forests at its steel mills in Nagoya, Sakai, Kamaishi, Futtu, Hikari, Muroran, and Yawata.

Since then, Miyawaki and his colleagues and partners have covered more than 1,300 sites with multilayered protective forests composed entirely of native species. The method has been tested successfully in almost all of Japan, sometimes on difficult substrates, including plantations to mitigate the effects of tsunamis on the coast, or typhoons in the port of Yokohama, wastelands, artificial islands, fixing crumbling slopes after road construction, and creating a forest on a cliff freshly cut with dynamite to construct the Monju Nuclear Power Plant in Fukui Prefecture.

== International applications ==
Miyawaki instructed people on planting in over 1,700 areas around the world, including over 1,400 sites in Japan as well as in Borneo, Amazonia, and China. He was involved in the planting of over 40 million native trees, together with companies and citizens, to contribute to international forest regeneration. Since 1978, Miyawaki had contributed to vegetation surveys in Thailand, Indonesia, and Malaysia.

His methodological work in the 1970s and 1980s on woodland management also formed the basis for the concept of "tiny forests", where small urban plots of land around the world can be densely planted with many different local species of trees to reintroduce varied wooded habitats that are rich in biodiversity.

=== France ===
In 2026, a new micro-forest is being planted in Berliet Park in Saint-Priest. In 2018, the Miyawaki method was implemented by the boomforest.org team in Paris, France, to restore a 400-square meter area near Porte de Montreuil, in the Boulevard Périphérique, a controlled-access dual-carriageway ring road around the city. In 2021, a 180-square meter area that used to be a parking lot in a residential district near Bordeaux's Saint-Jean railway station was converted into the city's first mini-forest.

=== India ===
In 2013, the Miyawaki method was applied in the Barapani Industrial Area of Umiam in northeast India.

Since that same date, the Anarghyaa Foundation has created Miyawaki forests in rural areas of north Bengaluru. The Anarghyaa Foundation will be creating mini-forests by planting lakh trees with the Miywaki method across Karnataka within the next year {which year?}.

In December 2019, the Annapradokshana Charitable Trust turned unused space in government schools into mini-forests by adopting the Miyawaki system at the Nonankuppam Government Higher Secondary School and the Vivekananda Government Boys Higher Secondary School in Villianur, Pondicherry.

The Sikh NGO, EcoSikh, has planted over 400 forests it calls 'Guru Nanak Sacred Forests' consisting of native plant species, using the Miyawaki method.

In June 2023, Xiaomi India partnered with United Way India (UWI) to create a mini-forest in Delhi NCR, following the Miyawaki initiative to promote ecological balance in the region. Under the program, 12,000 saplings of more than 60 different species will be planted.

Nearly 2 acres of Miyawaki Forest is being developed near Statue of Unity at Ekta Nagar, Gujarat.

=== Italy ===
In 2000, the Miyawaki method was tested for the first time in a Mediterranean ecosystem in Sardinia, Italy, on an area where traditional reforestation methods had failed. The original method was adapted while maintaining its theoretical principles. The results obtained after two and eleven years following planting were positive: plant biodiversity was high, and the new biocoenosis was able to improve without further operative support. On the other hand, between 61% and 84% of the newly planted trees had died after a period of twelve years.

=== Pakistan ===
In January 2021, Masood Lohar, a former UNDP officer, created the Clifton Urban Forest in Karachi, a private initiative operating over 200 acres on a coastline landfill site and following Miyawaki's techniques. In November, Karachi municipality announced a plan for growing 300 Miyawaki forests.

In August 2021, Imran Khan, Prime Minister of Pakistan, inaugurated the largest urban Miyawaki forest project in the world at Saggian. Using a technique pioneered by the late Japanese botanist Akira Miyawaki, the forest covers 12.5 acres and has more than 165,000 plants.

=== United Kingdom ===
In the United Kingdom, Miyawaki's "tiny forest" method was adopted by the environmental charity Earthwatch Europe with the aim to develop a hundred urban projects nationwide by 2023.

=== United States ===
The first Miyawaki forests in the United States were planted in industrial areas of Indiana and Kentucky in 2014. Since then, forests have been planted in New Haven and Madison, Indiana, as well as Camp Washingtion, Ohio. Other midwest forests have been planted in Markham, Illinois, Rochester, Michigan, Grand Forks, North Dakota, La Crosse, Wisconsin, the campus of University of Iowa, and Franconia Sculpture Park in Minnesota.

Massachusetts has at least twenty Miyawaki forests, with three in Cambridge and two newly planted in Worcester. The Cambridge Department of Public Works, with Biodiversity for a Livable Climate and Natural Urban Forests, planted the first in the northeastern United States in Danehy Park in September 2021 and a second in Greene-Rose Heritage Park in November 2022. A third was planted on private property in 2023. There are at least two in Brookline, one in Somerville, and one in Brighton. In May 2024, Worcester completed the planting of two Miyawaki forests—one reclaiming a formerly paved section of the municipal parking lot at the Worcester Public Library, and another on private land bordering a low-income housing complex. Both are in heat island neighborhoods.

Other American Miyawaki forests have been planted in Griffith Park in Los Angeles and on Yakama Indian Reservation in Washington state. A forest was planted in Bridgeport, Connecticut in the summer of 2026.

== Method and conditions for success ==
The method's reconstitution of "indigenous forests by indigenous trees" produces rich, dense and efficient protective pioneer forests in 20 to 30 years, where natural succession would need 200 years in temperate Japan and 300 to 500 years in the tropics. Success requires compliance with the following phases:

- Rigorous initial site survey and research of potential natural vegetation
- Identification and collection of a large number of various native seeds, locally or nearby and in a comparable geo-climatic context
- Germination in a nursery (which requires additional maintenance for some species; for example, those that germinate only after passing through the digestive tract of a certain animal, need a particular symbiotic fungus, or a cold induced dorming phase)
- Preparation of the substrate if it is very degraded, such as the addition of organic matter or mulch, and, in areas with heavy or torrential rainfall, planting mounds for taproot species that require a well-drained soil surface. Hill slopes can be planted with more ubiquitous surface roots species, such as cedar, Japanese cypress, and pine.
- Plantations respecting biodiversity inspired by the model of the natural forest. A dense plantation of very young seedlings (but with an already mature root system: with symbiotic bacteria and fungi present) is recommended. Density aims at stirring competition between species and the onset of phytosociological relations close to what would happen in nature (three to five plants per square metre in the temperate zone, up to five or ten seedlings per square metre in Borneo).
- Plantations randomly distributed in space in the way plants are distributed in a clearing or at the edge of the natural forest, not in rows or staggered

== Results ==
According to the classical theory of succession initiated by Frederic Clements in the U.S., a young native forest with a multi-layered community would need 150 to 200 years to restore itself on bare soil in Japan, and it would take at least 300 years to do the same in the tropics of Southeast Asia.

Miyawaki extensively tested the method in deforested sites in dry tropical zones in Thailand, alluvial tropical forests in the Brazilian Amazon, and the old Nothofagus forest area in Concepción, Chile.

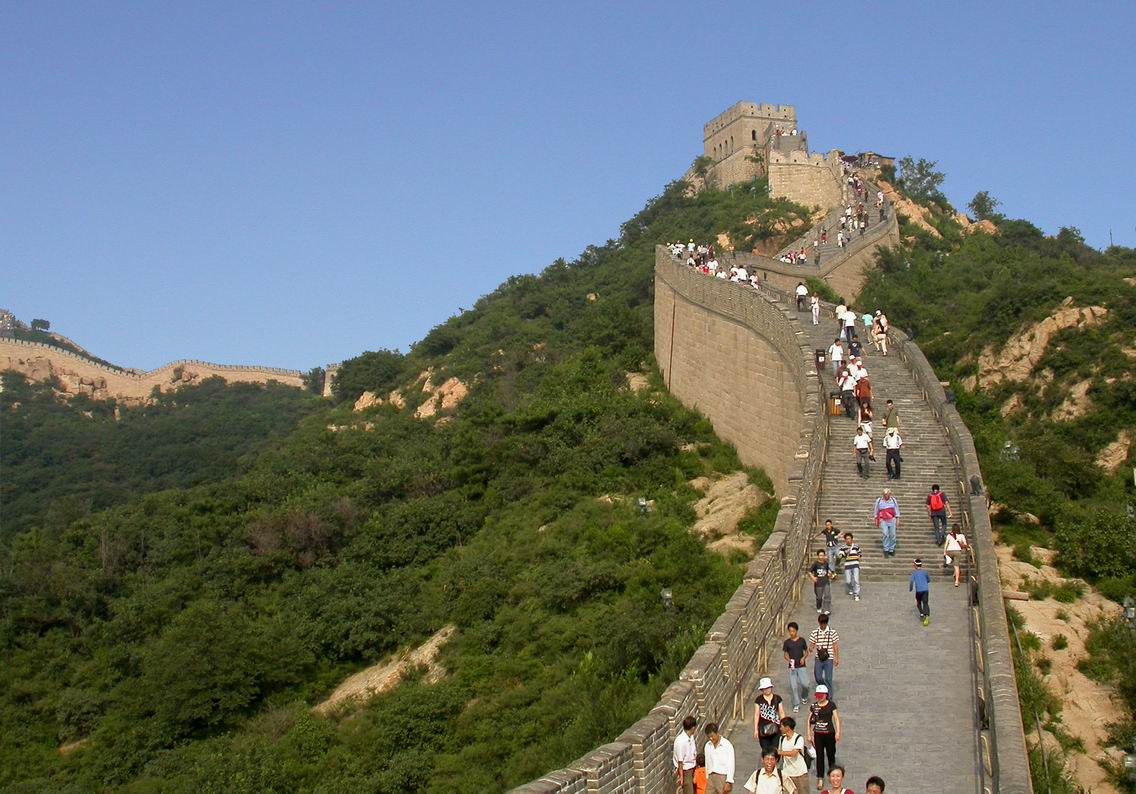
The forest planted along the Great Wall of China

In 1998, Miyawaki piloted a reforestation program dominated by Quercus mongolica along the Great Wall of China, and gathered 4,000 people to plant 400,000 trees, with the support of the Aeon Environment Foundation and the city of Beijing. The first trees planted by groups of Chinese and Japanese, on areas where the forest had long since gone, grew over 3 m high in 2004 and – except for one part – continued to thrive in 2007.

Miyawaki also contributed to the massive reforestation in China by its government and Chinese citizens in Pudong, Qingdao, Ningbo, and Ma'anshan.

Miyawaki received the 2006 Blue Planet Award for environmental conservation.

His method was deemed exemplary in a preparatory report for the 1992 Earth Summit and the 1994 UNESCO biodiversity congress in Paris The method was also presented in 1991 at the Symposium of the University of Bonn, and at the congresses of the International Association for Ecology, the International Society for Vegetation Science, and the International Botanical Congress, which included new aspects such as the links between growth, natural habitat, and estimated carbon fixation.

== Criticism ==
One criticism is the high cost of the initial establishment of a Miyawaki forest (nursery, soil preparation, dense planting) - around 3000 Euros per 100m², with a reasonable pilot project being around 500m².

Other criticisms focus on the efficacy of a man-made forest versus a naturally developed forest.

Miyawaki forests have also been criticized for ignoring site-specific ecological niches and serving as a newer option for corporate greenwashing, while maintaining the timber industry illusion that primary forests can be recreated quickly and easily.

== Biography ==
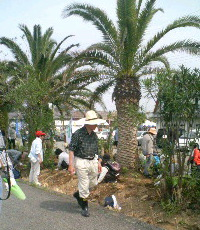
Supervising planting at Kii Tanabe in 2007

- 1928: Born 29 January in Okayama
- 1952: Diploma in biology, Hiroshima University
- 1958–1960: Visiting researcher under Reinhold Tüxen in Stolzenau, Germany
- 1961: Doctor of Science, Hiroshima University
- 1961–1962: Researcher at Yokohama National University
- 1962–1973: Associate Professor at Yokohama National University
- 1973–1993: Founding professor of the Institute of Environmental Science and Technology at Yokohama National University
- 1985–1993: Director of the Institute of Environmental Science and Technology at Yokohama National University
- 1993–: Professor Emeritus of Yokohama National University
- 1993–: Director of the Japanese Center for International Studies in Ecology

He was an honorary member of the International Association for Vegetation Science (1997).

== Publications ==
=== In English ===
- Miyawaki A (1992). Restoration of Evergreen Broad-leaved Forests in the Pacific Region. In: M.K. Wali (ed.). Ecosystem Rehabilitation. 2. Ecosystem Analysis and synthesis. SPB Academic Publishing, The Hague
- Miyawaki A, K. Fujiwara & E.O. Box (1987). Toward harmonious green urban environments in Japan and other countries. Bull. Inst. Environ. Sci. Technol.. Yokohama Natl. Univ. 14: Yokohama.
- Miyawaki A & S. Okuda (1991). Vegetation of Japan Illustrated. Shibundo, Tokyo (Japanese)
- Miyawaki A et al. (1983). Handbook of Japanese Vegetation, Shibundo, Tokyo
- Miyawaki A (1980-1989). Vegetation of Japan. vol. 1-10
- Miyawaki A (1985). Vegetation-Ecological Studies on Mangrove Forests in Thailand, Inst. Environ. Sci. Technol. Yokohama Natl. Univ., Yokohama
- Miyawaki A, Bogenrider, S. Okuda & I. White (1987). Vegetation Ecology and Creation of New Environments. Proceedings of International Symp. in Tokyo and Phytogeographical Excursion through Central Japan. Tokai Univ. Press, Tokyo
- Miyawaki A, & E. O. Box (1996). The Healing Power of Forests -The Philosophy behind Restoring Earth's Balance with Native Trees. 286 p. Kosei Publishing Co. Tokyo
- Miyawaki A, Plants and Human (NHK Books)
- Miyawaki A, The Last Day for Man (Chikuma Shobo)
- Miyawaki A, Testimony by Green Plants (Tokyo Shoseki)
- Miyawaki A, Prescription for Restoration of Green Environments (Asahi Shinbun-sha)
- Miyawaki A, Chinju-no-mori (Native Forests of Native Trees) (Shincho-sha).

=== In Japanese ===
- 日本植生誌 (lit. 'Japanese Plant Journal'), edition 至文堂, 2000, ISBN 978-4-7843-0040-2.
- 植物と人間 (lit. 'Plants and Men'), editions NHK
- 緑回復の処方箋 (lit. 'Prescription for a Green Relaunch')
- 鎮守の森 (lit. 'Forest of the Deities'), Shinshio Journal (新潮)
- いのちを守るドングリの森
- 東京に「いのちの森」を!, 2018, ISBN 978-4-8657-8193-9.
