= Danehy Park =

Public park in Cambridge, Massachusetts

Coordinates: 42.389°N 71.136°W

Thomas W. Danehy Park is a park in North Cambridge, Massachusetts. Its eastern entrance is at 99 Sherman Street. It is bounded on the north by the MBTA Fitchburg Line and to the west by Fresh Pond Mall.

The lands in northwest Cambridge had previously been a brickyard and, from 1952, a city dumping ground. The landfill closed in the early 1970s, at which point the city of Cambridge allowed the MBTA to use the land as a staging area during construction of the Red Line in the late 1970s and early 1980s. The MBTA also dumped soil excavated from tunnels on the site. After a redevelopment effort that cost $11 million, the 50-acre (20 ha) expanse opened to the public in 1990, containing athletic fields, paths, and a wetland area.

The park was named after Thomas W. Danehy, mayor of Cambridge from 1978 to 1979.

Engineering firm Camp Dresser & McKee led development efforts. Opening ceremonies included a skydiver. Danehy Park increased Cambridge's open space by 20%.

Saudi Prince Turki bin Faisal often visited the park with his entourage after its opening, which led to controversy when a limousine was driven onto the park's athletic fields.

The park includes an artwork by Mierle Laderman Ukeles titled Turnaround/Surround. A path made of recycled glass and asphalt designed by the artist leads to the top of a small hill, where two aluminum sculptural benches and a "dance floor" are located.

Danehy Park has been identified by the Society of Architectural Historians and American Society of Landscape Architects as one of the first examples of a landfill redeveloped as a park in New England.

It is the location of Cambridge's first Miyawaki forest, planted in September 2021.
