= Biotechnology industry in Boston =

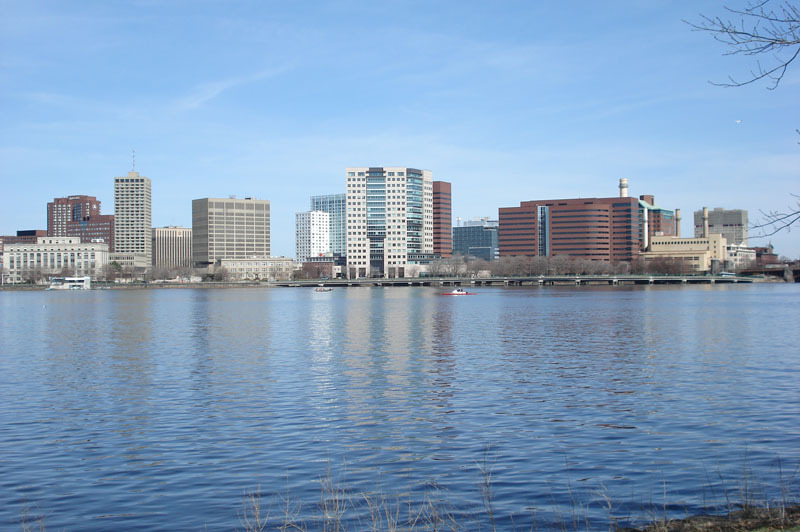
Kendall Square area, viewed from across the Charles River

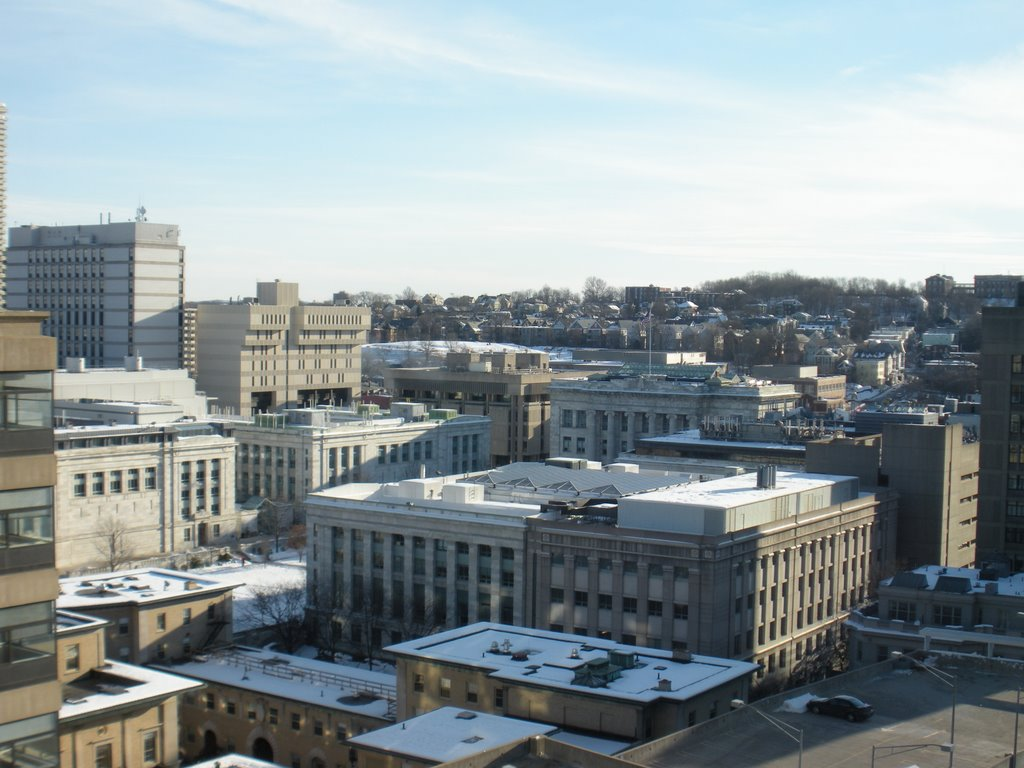
The Harvard Medical School quadrangle and adjacent Longwood Medical and Academic Area in Boston

Greater Boston, primarily Boston and Cambridge, is home to more than 1,000 biotechnology companies, ranging from small start-ups to billion-dollar pharmaceutical companies. The many universities in the area give the region a large network of scientists.

The Kendall Square area of Cambridge holds a large concentration of the life science industry, numbering over 120 companies within a mile, and has been described as the "center of the nation's biotechnology industry". The Longwood area of Boston, about two miles from Kendall Square, is also home to many biomedical research companies.

== History ==
The biotechnology industry in Boston dates back to the 1970s, when genetic engineering was developing. Biogen was the first company in Boston to focus on biotechnology.

In 2008, Massachusetts Governor Deval Patrick announced the Massachusetts Life Sciences Act, promising $1 billion to further the development of the biotech industry. In April 2016, the administration of Massachusetts Governor Charlie Baker announced $20 million in job creation tax incentives to 28 life science companies in the state to create 1,300 jobs. In May 2018, Governor Baker signed into law a $623 million life sciences initiative. Massachusetts is among the top states for biotech jobs. In 2016, venture investment in Massachusetts biopharma companies was $2.9 billion, and more than half of the biotech companies in the state receiving venture capital were located in Cambridge. When Cambridge and Boston were considered together, they received more than 80% of the funding in the state. Seven teaching hospitals are located in Boston, contributing to the research efforts. Five of the top six NIH-funded independent hospitals in the United States are located in Boston. From 2008 to 2020, the Greater Boston biotechnology industry workforce grew approximately 55% from 54,000 to 84,000 workers.

In 2021, Massachusetts biopharmaceutical companies raised a record $13.7 billion in venture capital in a 70% increase from the previous year, while there was approximately 10 million square feet of office and industrial space in Greater Boston being converted into lab space for the life sciences industry as the office vacancy rate in Downtown Boston reached its highest point in a decade with 3.5 million square feet available on the sublease market. During the COVID-19 pandemic, the National Institutes of Health provided billions of dollars in funding to the biotechnology industry in addition to the venture capital firms, and the increase in financing led to demand for lab space in Greater Boston to increase to three times the typical pre-COVID level. While Greater Boston area biotechnology companies began announcing layoffs of 30 to 60% of company workforces (with some firms shutting down altogether) as the 2022 stock market decline began, the Greater Boston biotechnology industry workforce continued to grow from approximately 84,000 in 2020 to 114,000 in 2022.

In May 2022, a conference attended by Massachusetts U.S. Senator Ed Markey, Governor Baker, U.S. Representative Richard Neal from Massachusetts's 1st congressional district, and University of Massachusetts System President Marty Meehan was held at the UMass Club to launch a bid to have the U.S. Department of Health and Human Services locate a regional headquarters of the recently created Advanced Research Projects Agency for Health (ARPA-H) in the Greater Boston area. In June 2022, lab space inventory in Greater Boston was estimated to have more than doubled over the preceding decade from 18.6 million square feet in 2012 to 41 million square feet in 2022 (with the second largest market of lab space in the country in the San Francisco Bay Area trailing Greater Boston by 10 million square feet), and lab space inventory has expanded beyond the traditional hubs in Kendall Square and Longwood across the entire region to include clusters in Watertown, Waltham, and Somerville and into communities comparatively unexpected to host lab space (e.g. Malden, Beverly, and Billerica).

Due to rising interest rates, it was estimated in November 2022 that 80% of the 40 million square feet in proposed lab space construction in Greater Boston would be scaled back or put on hold. In 2022, Massachusetts biotechnology companies raised $8.7 billion in venture capital in a 37% decrease from the previous year, while during the first half of 2023, Massachusetts biotechnology companies raised $3.7 billion in venture capital financing in a 27% decrease from the $5.1 billion raised during first half of 2022. In May 2023, the administration of Massachusetts Governor Maura Healey announced $24.4 million in job creation tax incentives for 43 life sciences companies in the state to create 1,600 jobs, and in June 2023, Boston Mayor Michelle Wu announced a $4 million workforce development program to provide job training to 1,000 Boston residents for entry into the biotech industry.

In September 2023, JLL released a report that found that demand for biotechnology laboratory space nationally and in the Greater Boston area and the San Francisco Bay Area specifically were slowing during the 2021–2023 inflation surge due to a 35 to 40% decline in venture capital financing for life science startup companies and rising interest rates following the building boom that began prior to the COVID-19 pandemic. In the same month, ARPA-H announced that one of its three headquarters would be located in Cambridge. Despite an 11% increase in occupied inventory during the previous year, the vacancy rate for lab space in Greater Boston was estimated to have increased to a 10-year high in the third quarter of 2023 at 11.7% or more than 5 million square feet of unclaimed space, as demand for lab space fell from approximately 8 million square feet in 2021 with only 300,000 square feet unclaimed and 0.1% of newly constructed lab space unleased down to approximately 2 million square feet in 2023 and with 30% of newly constructed lab space unleased and sublease inventory accounting for 40% of all available lab space.

== Local industry ==
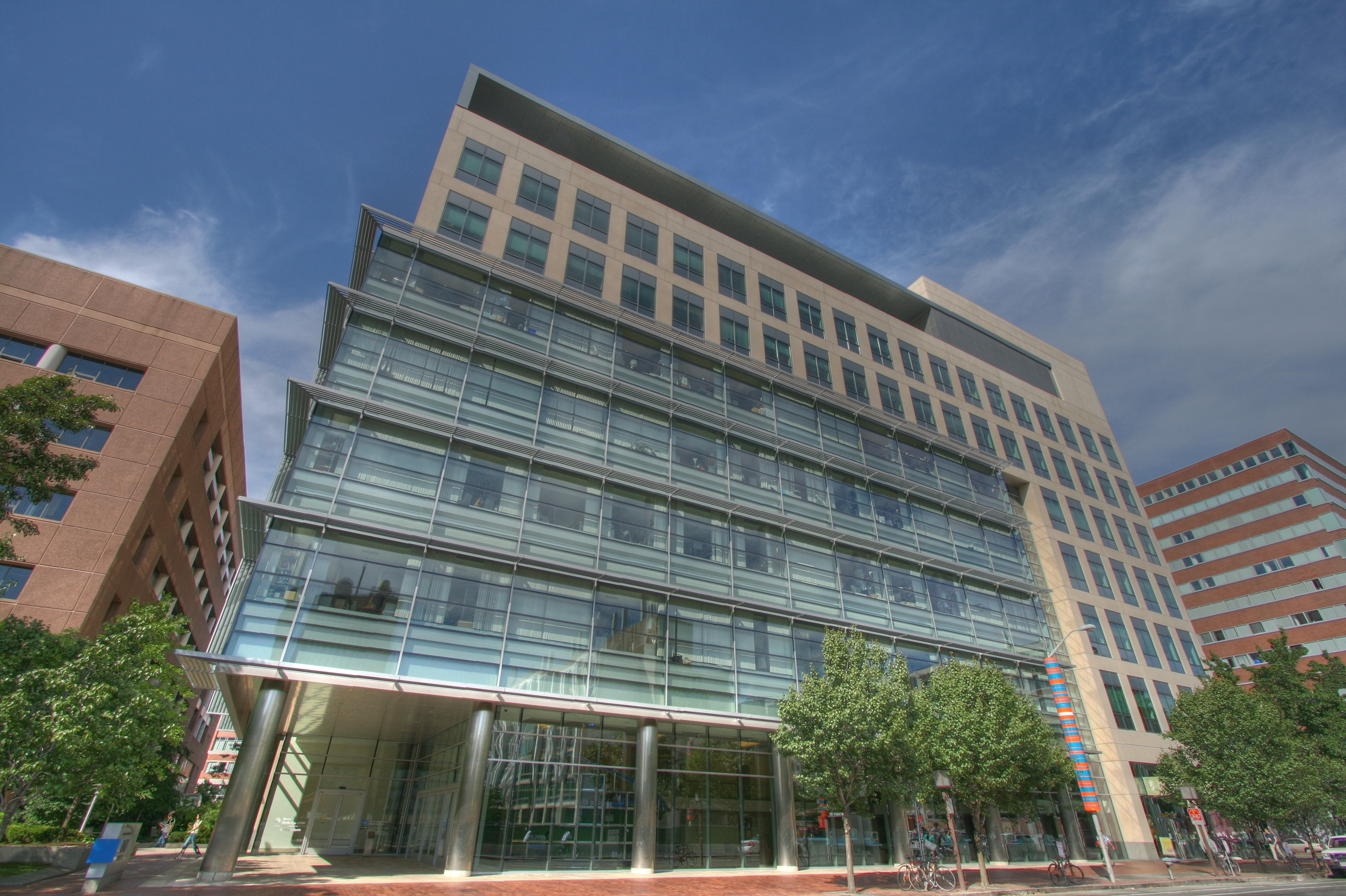
The Broad Institute is located in the life sciences hub of Kendall Square

=== Academic institutes ===
- Broad Institute
- Whitehead Institute for Biomedical Research
- Wyss Institute for Biologically Inspired Engineering
- Mass General Research Institute

=== Biotechnology companies ===
- Abcam
- Addgene
- Biogen
- Boston Scientific
- Conagen
- Foundation Medicine
- GSK
- Genzyme
- ImmunoGen
- Intarcia Therapeutics
- Moderna Therapeutics
- NovoBiotic Pharmaceuticals
- pSivida
- Sage Therapeutics
- Thrombolytic Science International
- Thermo Fisher Scientific
- Vaxess Technologies
- Ventum Biotech
- Waters Corporation

=== Pharmaceutical companies ===
- AbbVie
- Acceleron Pharma
- Aderis Pharmaceuticals
- Agios Pharmaceuticals
- Akebia Therapeutics
- Alkermes
- Alnylam Pharmaceuticals
- Alzheon
- Amgen
- Bayer
- Bristol Myers Squibb
- Editas Medicine
- Eli Lilly and Company
- Intellia Therapeutics
- Ipsen
- Ironwood Pharmaceuticals
- Merck & Co.
- Novartis
- Novo Nordisk
- Ono Pharmaceutical
- Pfizer
- Sanofi
- Sarepta Therapeutics
- Takeda Pharmaceuticals
- Ultragenyx
- Vertex Pharmaceuticals

=== Other related companies ===
- Atlas Venture
- Cytel
- Fast Track Initiative
- IDDI
- Lab Central
- Hatch.Bio Labs
- Massachusetts Biotechnology Council (MassBio)

== See also ==
- List of biotech and pharmaceutical companies in the New York metropolitan area
- Bayside Expo Center#Bay City development
- Morrissey Boulevard#Biotechnology industry
