= Surgical drape =

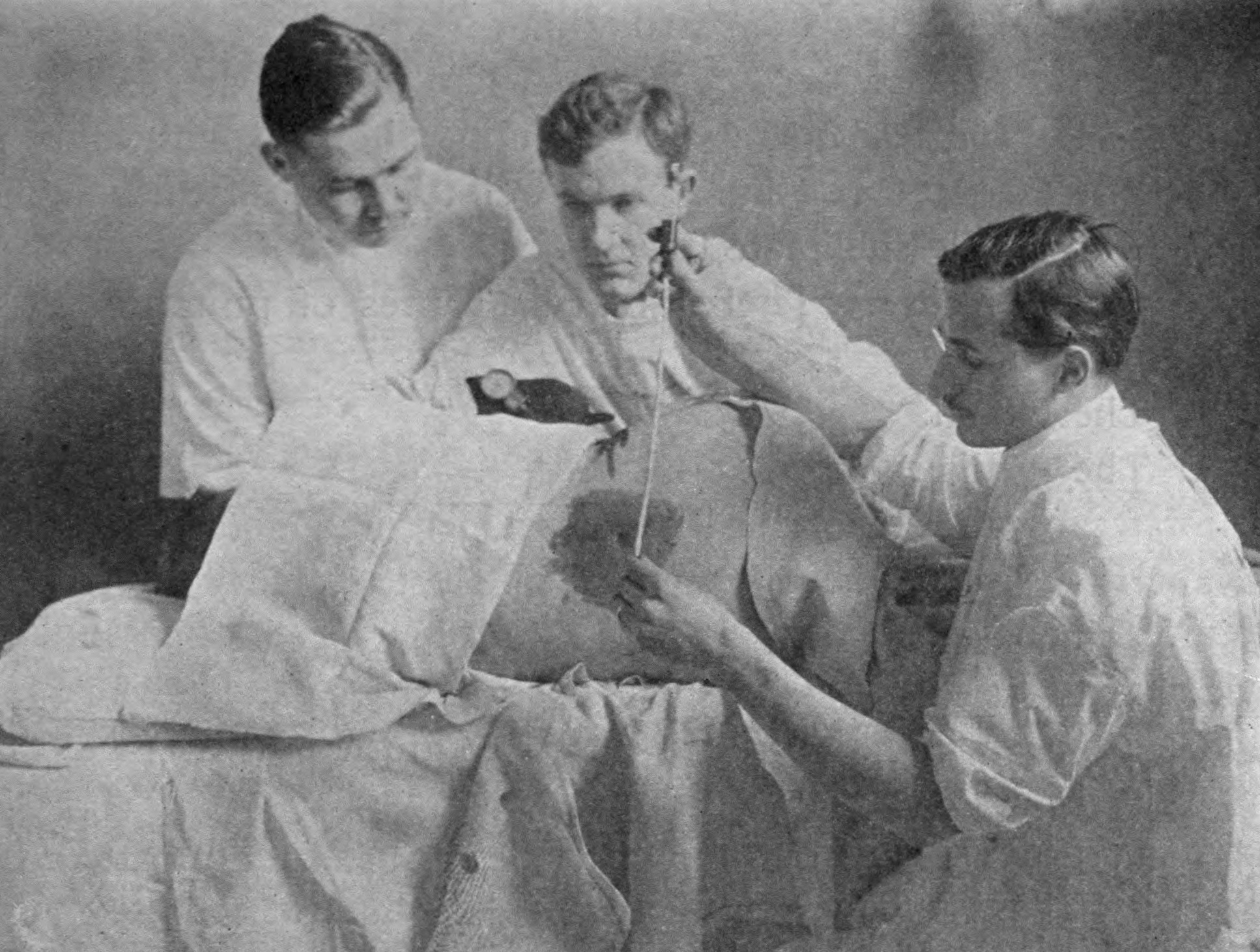
- Site of the operation is draped off with sterile towels

A surgical drape is a sterile sheet used to create a sterile field during surgical procedures with the purpose of preventing the spread of infection from non-sterile to sterile areas and protecting the patient from contamination. The use of surgical drapes is a standard procedure in modern surgery . Surgical drapes come in various shapes and sizes, including those that are made of materials resistant to penetration by liquids and microorganisms.

== Description ==
Sterile sheets are used as surgical drapes to create a sterile field during surgical procedures. Drapes are used to prevent the spread of infection from non-sterile to sterile areas and to protect the patient from contamination. The use of surgical drape not only serves to protect the surgical site, but also expands the sterile field, allowing surgical team members to place sterile supplies onto them.

The use of surgical drapes is a standard procedure in modern surgery and is recommended by many professional organizations, including the World Health Organization (WHO) and the Centers for Disease Control and Prevention (CDC).

Some studies have shown that the use of surgical drapes reduces the incidence of surgical site infections (SSIs), which are suggested to be a significant cause of morbidity and mortality in surgical patients, as well as hospitalization costs.

=== Construction ===
Surgical drapes come in various shapes and sizes, including those that are made of materials resistant to penetration by liquids and microorganisms. The drapes are placed over the patient and surrounding areas to create a sterile field. The edges of the drapes are secured with adhesive tape or other means to prevent the drapes from moving during the procedure.
