= Bridge US =

American legal services corporation

- Type: Private
- Industry: Legal Services
- Founded: 2012
- Founder: Romish Badani; Forrest Blount
- Headquarters: San Francisco, California
- Area served: United States
- Website: www.bridge.us

Bridge US is a San Francisco, California based legal services corporation that offers immigration services and resources in the United States.

== History ==
The company was founded in late 2012 after being incubated at the Harvard Innovation Lab.

In 2013, Bridge US raised $800,000, with backers including 500 Startups and Miriam Rivera, COO and general counsel of the Minerva Project, a venture backed educational institution.

In 2014, Bridge US launched an immigration software platform for lawyers and human resources professionals, which enables companies, whether corporate or small-scale, to efficiently hire immigrant workers. The Bridge US dashboard uses web forms to guide users and companies through the process of gaining visas for foreign labor.

In 2020, Next Act, an initiative launched by Unshackled Ventures, NGO Upwardly Global, and Bridge US to help job seekers, shared data that indicated a rising withdrawal of internships and job offers amidst the COVID-19 pandemic.

It was acquired in 2023 by Boundless Immigration.
