= Alumni Ventures =

American venture capital firm

- Type: Private
- Industry: Venture capital
- Founded: 2014
- Founders: Mike Collins, Luke Antal
- Headquarters: Manchester, United States
- Key people: Mike Collins (CEO)
- Website: www.av.vc

Alumni Ventures (also Alumni Ventures Group, LLC or AVG) is an American venture capital firm based in Manchester, New Hampshire, that pools money from individual accredited investors into venture funds. Many of its funds are organized around the alumni of particular universities.

== History ==
AV was founded in 2014 by Mike Collins and Luke Antal. Collins, CEO, who previously worked at TA Associates, wanted to make venture capital more accessible to individual people and had grown tired of how the industry was mostly limited to the institutional investors and the ultra wealthy. When AV started, Collins raised $1.5 million in funding from alumni of his alma mater, Dartmouth College, for the fund Green D Ventures.

== Structure and fees ==
The firm focuses on fundraising directly from individuals, taking a $10,000 minimum from each investor, rather than getting large investment funding from institutional investors.

Its alumni funds include Green D Ventures (Dartmouth), The Yard Ventures (Harvard), Spike Ventures (Stanford), Castor Ventures (MIT), Purple Arch Ventures (Northwestern), and Strawberry Creek Ventures (University of California-Berkeley). Some students of universities claim the way AV advertises these funds is misleading as it gives the impression they are university officially sanctioned endeavors when they are in fact not affiliated with the universities themselves.

The firm focuses on investing in companies and avoids taking board of directors seats to change the company's direction. Some founders are unaware that AV owns a part of their company.

On March 4, 2022, the U.S. Securities and Exchange Commission (SEC) fined AV $700,000 for making misleading contract statements and breaching operating agreements. The SEC alleged AV's marketing communications claimed to have an industry standard management fee, which was a 2% management fee during each year of its funds’ 10-year term and a separate 20% performance fee. Instead, AV assessed a management fee of 20% of an investor's fund investment at the start which represented 10 years of 2% annual management fees. The SEC also alleged AV commingled funds assets through loans and transfers among the funds, despite language in their operating agreements stating this was prohibited. AV has blamed sloppiness in its marketing materials for the cause of the problem. Apart from paying the fines, AV also returned $4.8 million worth of fees to investors and also hired a new compliance officer who rewrote the policies and procedures of AV to review any "written communication" about fees by AV employees.

== Investments ==
Notable AV investments include Groq, Rigetti Computing, Axiom Space, Oura Health, RapidSOS, Bluesky, and Circle.
