= Surgibox =

Portable inflatable operating theatre

- Type: Surgical device
- Inventor: Debbie Lin Teodorescu
- Manufacturer: Surgibox Inc.
- Website: https://www.surgibox.com/

Surgibox is a portable inflatable operating theater designed to provide a safe and sterile surgical environment for use in settings such as disaster relief areas, humanitarian efforts, and remote combat zones.

== History ==
Surgibox was invented by Debbie Lin Teodorescu while working in response to the 2010 Haiti earthquake, who saw the need to perform urgent surgical procedures without access to an operating theater and sterile operating environment.

== Design and function ==
The patented Surgibox design is used primarily for abdominal, chest, pelvic and orthopedic surgical procedures. It is designed to be portable.

There are three parts in Surgibox, a plastic bubble, a control module and a battery pack. Surgibox is inflated with HEPA using renewable batteries. It weighs less than 5 kilograms and can be transported in a 30-litre backpack.

Surgibox sticks to human skin using adhesives. The skin and the plastic bubble form a sterile space, which allows surgeons to operate through entry ports on the side of the device. The plastic bubble is single-use format.

The Surgibox enclosure keeps the sterile space well within the safety limits of operating theaters and also protects healthcare workers from body fluids.

== Awards ==
- UK Design Museum Design Of the Year finalist
- Harvard Innovations Labs' President's Challenge Grand Prize
- MassChallenge winner
