= Harvard Innovation Labs =

American institution

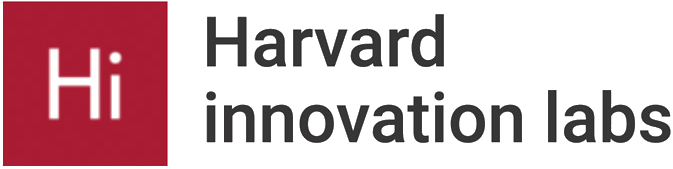

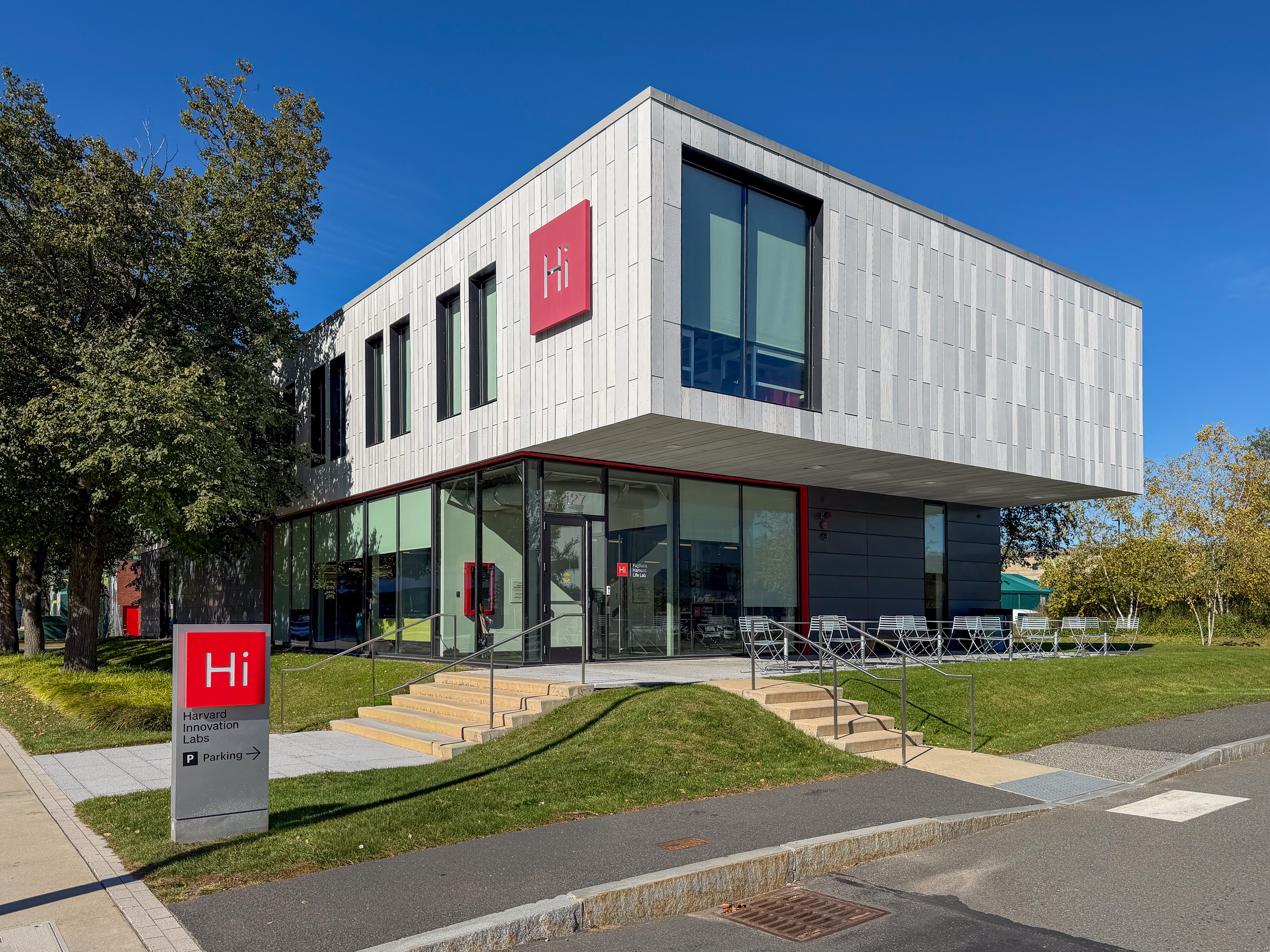
- Pagliuca Harvard Life Lab
- Industry: Education
- Founded: 2011; 15 years ago
- Headquarters: Boston, Massachusetts, United States
- Key people: Matthew M. Segneri (executive director); Thomas Eisenmann (faculty chair)
- Website: innovationlabs.harvard.edu

Harvard Innovation Labs (i-Lab) is an institution which aims to promote team-based and entrepreneurial activities among Harvard students, faculty, entrepreneurs, and members of the Allston and Greater Boston communities.

The i-Lab has incubated more than 4,000 teams and early-stage companies ranging through various stages of the entrepreneurship lifecycle, and these companies have collectively raised over $7 Billion.

== Administration ==
Gordon Jones was named the inaugural director of the i-Lab in 2011. Jodi Goldstein succeeded Jones in 2015 and served in the position through the 2019-20 academic year. Chris Colbert served alongside Goldstein from 2016 as the director of i-Lab until 2019. The current executive director of the i-Lab is Matthew M. Segneri who most recently served as director of the Social Enterprise Initiative at Harvard Business School before succeeding Goldstein in 2020. Professor Srikant Datar serves as faculty chairperson. The i-Lab has approximately 14 administrative and support staff members.

== Facilities ==
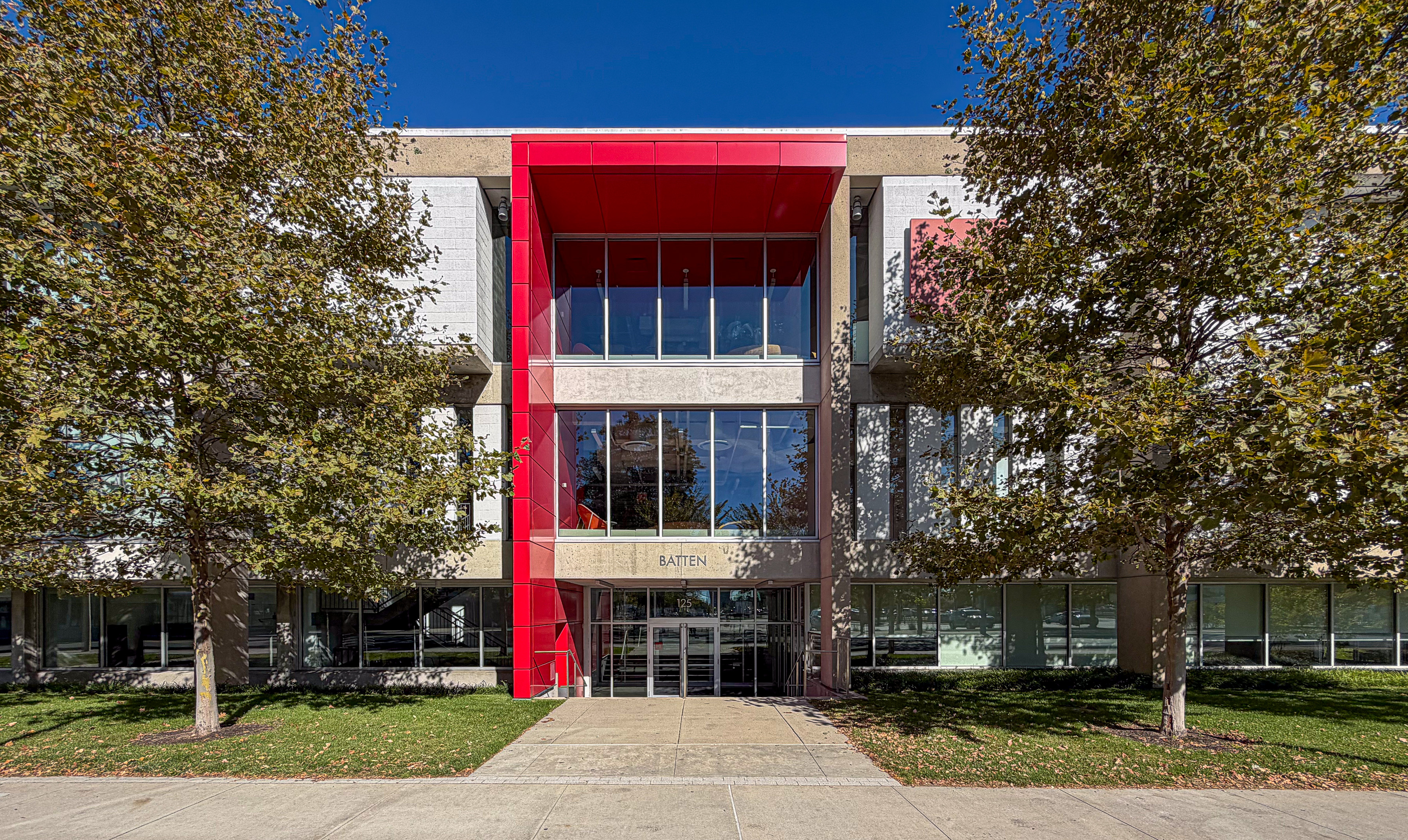
Harvard i-lab at Batten Hall

The i-Lab is headquartered at 125 Western Avenue, Allston, MA 02163. The i-Lab occupies over 30,000 square feet of space divided into three areas: the lobby area which is open to the public, a multi-media lecture hall used to host RSVP events, and a flex-space open area for registered i-Lab residents. The i-Lab also has more than 20 reservable conference rooms and a stocked kitchen.

In 2014, the facilities were extended to include the Harvard Launch Lab, a space for Harvard alumni to continue business incubation. Unlike the i-Lab, which is free for Harvard students, the Launch Lab functions on a pay-for-table model. In 2015, the Launch lab added an addendum facility to foster 35 more teams.

Harvard Business School's public arts program installed Digital DNA, a sculpture from Palo Alto made with recycled circuit boards, outside of the i-Lab in 2018.

== Challenges ==
The i-Lab hosts several competitions open to students across the university ("Challenges"). The Challenges are similar to traditional business plan competitions in which teams submit proposals, give presentations, and are judged by a panel of experts. There are cash and in-kind prizes awarded to Challenge winners. Challenges at the i-Lab include:

- President's Challenge: The President's Challenge is designed to help students develop and execute solutions to complex systemic problems facing the world. Past winners and finalists include Vaxess Technologies and SurgiBox.
- Deans' Cultural Entrepreneurship Challenge: The Deans’ Cultural Entrepreneurship Challenge calls upon visionary and entrepreneurial students to develop solutions for expanding the role of the arts in society and supporting arts and artists in a sustainable manner.
- Deans' Health and Life Sciences Challenge: The Deans’ Health and Life Sciences Challenge encourages students from across the University to find entrepreneurial solutions to the task of delivering affordable health.

== Venture Incubation Program ==
The Venture Incubation Program (VIP) is open to full-time degree-seeking students and select alumni of any of the Harvard schools that are working on an entrepreneurial or innovative ventures. The 12-week program has fall, spring, and summer cohorts. As of November 2018, 1,146 VIP student teams have participated. In the first half of 2020, several VIP teams played significant roles in addressing the COVID-19 global pandemic, from making personal protection equipments (PPE) to providing key economic data for the Harvard COVID-19 Business Impact Center. In February 2022, the Harvard Innovation Labs announced its largest-ever Venture Program cohort, with 628 ventures participating. While the program does not provide funding to teams, it does provide them with:

- Shared co-working space
- Private workshops
- Industry-specific roundtables
- Mentor-matching program
- Founder Dinners with visiting entrepreneurs
- Exclusive Office Hours with guest experts
- i-Lab Staff Advisor
- Technical resources including hosting credits
- Access to an Augmented Reality Studio
- Access to a hardware prototyping lab

== Notable companies ==
The following is an incomplete list of notable companies (raised $100M+ in venture funding) that were incubated at the Harvard Innovation Labs:

- Alfred
- Catalant
- Evisort
- Handy
- Mark43
- Philo
- Plastiq
- RapidSOS
- RightHand Robotics
- SES
- Shield AI
- TetraScience
- Tomorrow.io
- Whoop
- Zoomcar
- Zumper
