= Brooklyn Ice Cream Factory =

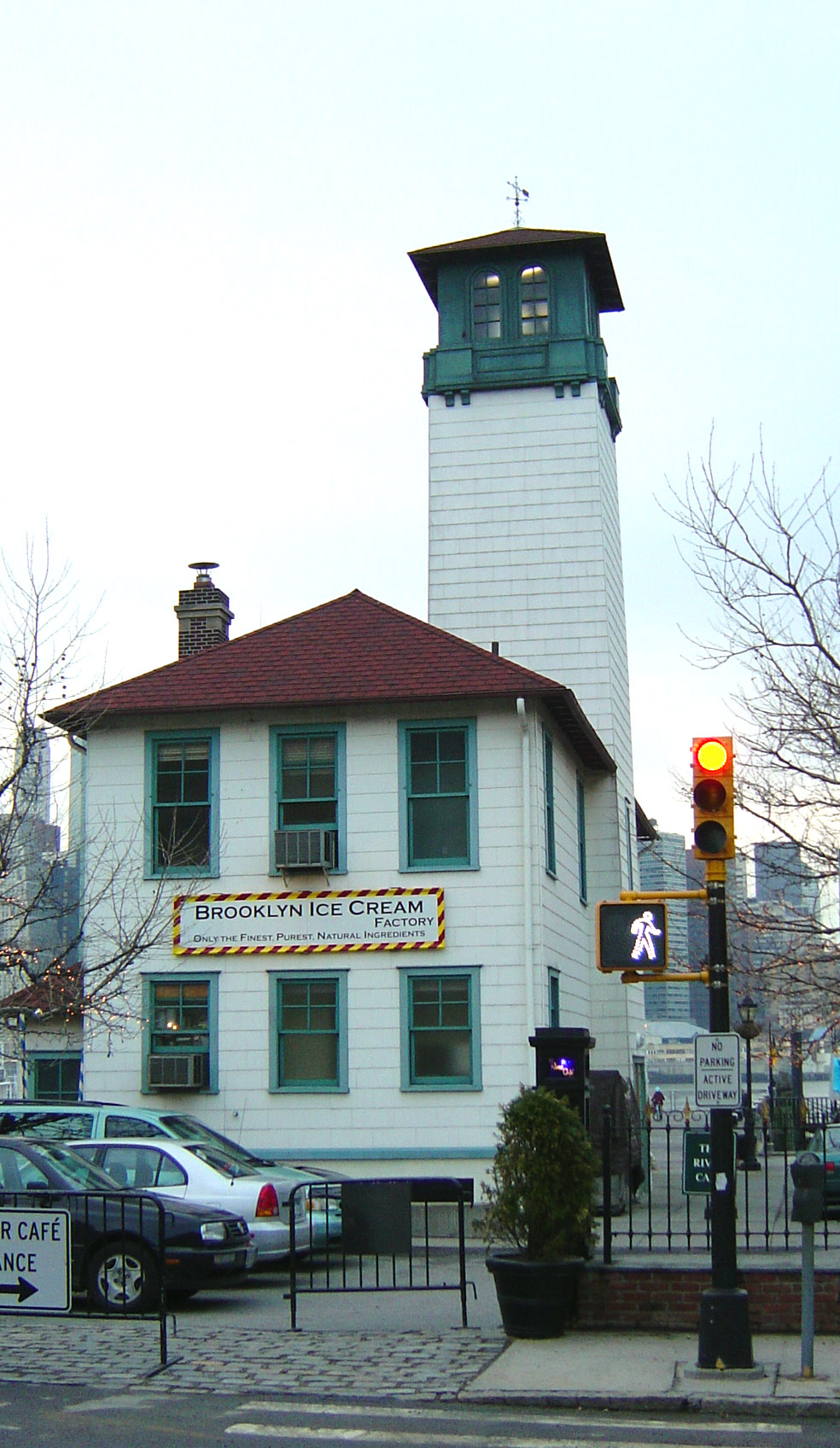
- Brooklyn Ice Cream Factory in 2004
- Interactive map of Brooklyn Ice Cream Factory

Restaurant information
- Established: 2001; 25 years ago
- Owner: Mark Thompson
- Location: 1 Water Street (Original) 14 Old Fulton Street (Current), Brooklyn, Kings County, New York, 11201, United States
- Coordinates: 40.70272°N 73.99450°W
- Website: BrooklynIceCreamFactory.com

The Brooklyn Ice Cream Factory is an ice cream shop in Brooklyn, New York City. Its original location was a converted 1922 fireboat house at 1 Water Street, on the Fulton Ferry Landing Pier, in the Dumbo neighborhood near the Brooklyn Bridge. It was replaced by an outpost of the Ample Hills ice cream stores in June 2019, which was subsequently replaced by an outpost of Van Leeuwen Ice Cream in May 2023. Brooklyn Ice Cream Factory remained in business at a new temporary location in the Greenpoint neighborhood until March 2021, when it reopened across the street from the original location at 14 Old Fulton Street.

== History ==
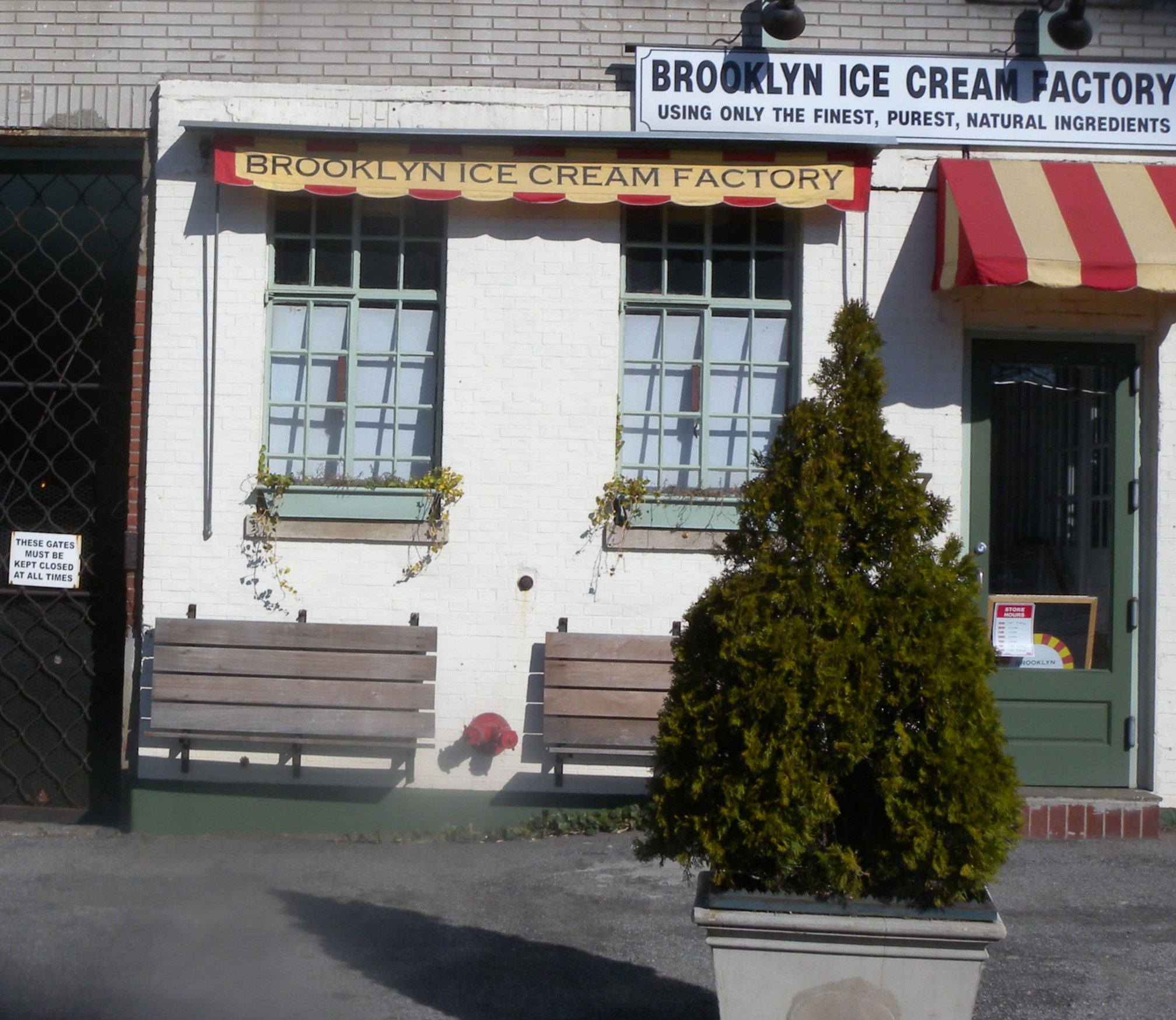
Brooklyn Ice Cream Factory in Greenpoint

The ice cream shop was opened by owner Mark Thompson in 2001, shortly after the September 11 attacks.

It sat near the Brooklyn Bridge in a landmark fireboat house on the Fulton Ferry landing, the oldest in Brooklyn. In the past, firefighters from the nearby marine fireboat station used the building for firefighting practice sessions.

The Fulton Ferry location was replaced by an outpost of the Ample Hills ice cream stores in June 2019. Brooklyn Ice Cream Factory remained in business at a single new location in the Greenpoint neighborhood until March 2021.

== New Location ==
Brooklyn Ice Cream Factory reopened across the street, from its original historic location at the Brooklyn Landing, on March 10, 2021.

== Ice cream ==
All of its ice cream, and its hot fudge, is freshly made. The ice cream is old-fashioned, with less butterfat, and made without eggs. The ice cream is made in small batches of eight flavors known as “The Great 8” (including chocolate, vanilla, butter pecan, strawberry, vanilla chocolate chunk, chocolate chocolate chunk, peaches and cream, and coffee ice) and claims that no preservatives are used. An article in The New York Times described the ice creams as "creamy, ethereally light and perfectly balanced. They practically float into your mouth and leave no heavy film on your palate."

The Clinton St. Baking Company & Restaurant on the Lower East Side used ice cream from the Brooklyn Ice Cream Factory in some of its desserts.

In June 2006, Patrick Bertoletti, a 20-year-old Chicago culinary student, set the 8-minute ice-cream competitive eating record by eating 1.75 gallons of vanilla ice cream at the Brooklyn Ice Cream Factory, winning $2,000 in the process.

== Accolades ==
New York City for Dummies called its ice cream "the best ice cream in New York", as did The Sunday Times and Frommer's New York City 2011. Former Bronx borough president Fernando Ferrer is partial to the restaurant's French vanilla ice cream.
