= C8H18N2O4S =

The molecular formula C_{8}H_{18}N_{2}O_{4}S (molar mass: 238.30 g/mol, exact mass: 238.0987 u) may refer to:

- Burgess reagent
- HEPES
- Valiltramiprosate
