= Digital DNA =

Public sculpture about Silicon Valley

- Weathered condition of Digital DNA as it appeared in public in Palo Alto in 2017
- Artist: Adriana Varella and Nilton Maltz
- Year: 2005
- Medium: Printed circuit boards
- Dimensions: 210 cm × 150 cm (84 in × 60 in)

Digital DNA is a public art project commissioned by the Palo Alto Public Arts Commission for Lytton Plaza in downtown Palo Alto, California. It was created by Adriana Varella and Nilton Maltz and installed in 2005. Digital DNA addresses complicated themes of technology and public space in Silicon Valley. In 2018, the sculpture was removed from the plaza and was later installed outside of the i-Lab at Harvard Business School.

== Commission ==
The Palo Alto Public Arts Commission is primarily funded by the Palo Alto City Council and aims to beautify the city and support (often emerging) contemporary artists while contributing to the cultural life of the community. In 2000, the seven member Commission approved the modern artwork Digital DNA for the 0.2-acre (810 m^{2}) plaza on the corner of University Avenue and Emerson Street.

== Lytton Plaza ==
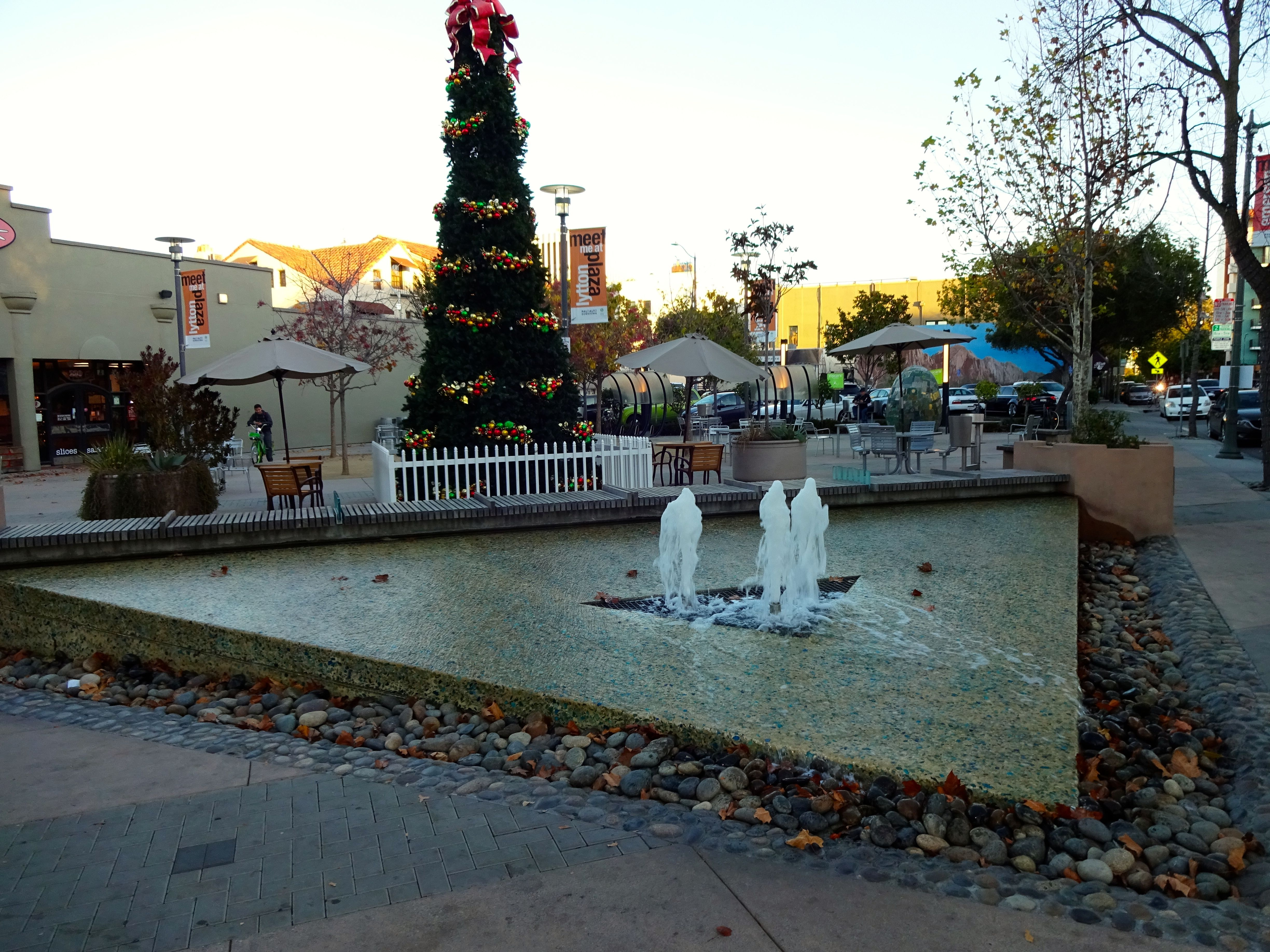
Lytton Plaza as seen from the sidewalk on University Avenue. Digital DNA is in the background.

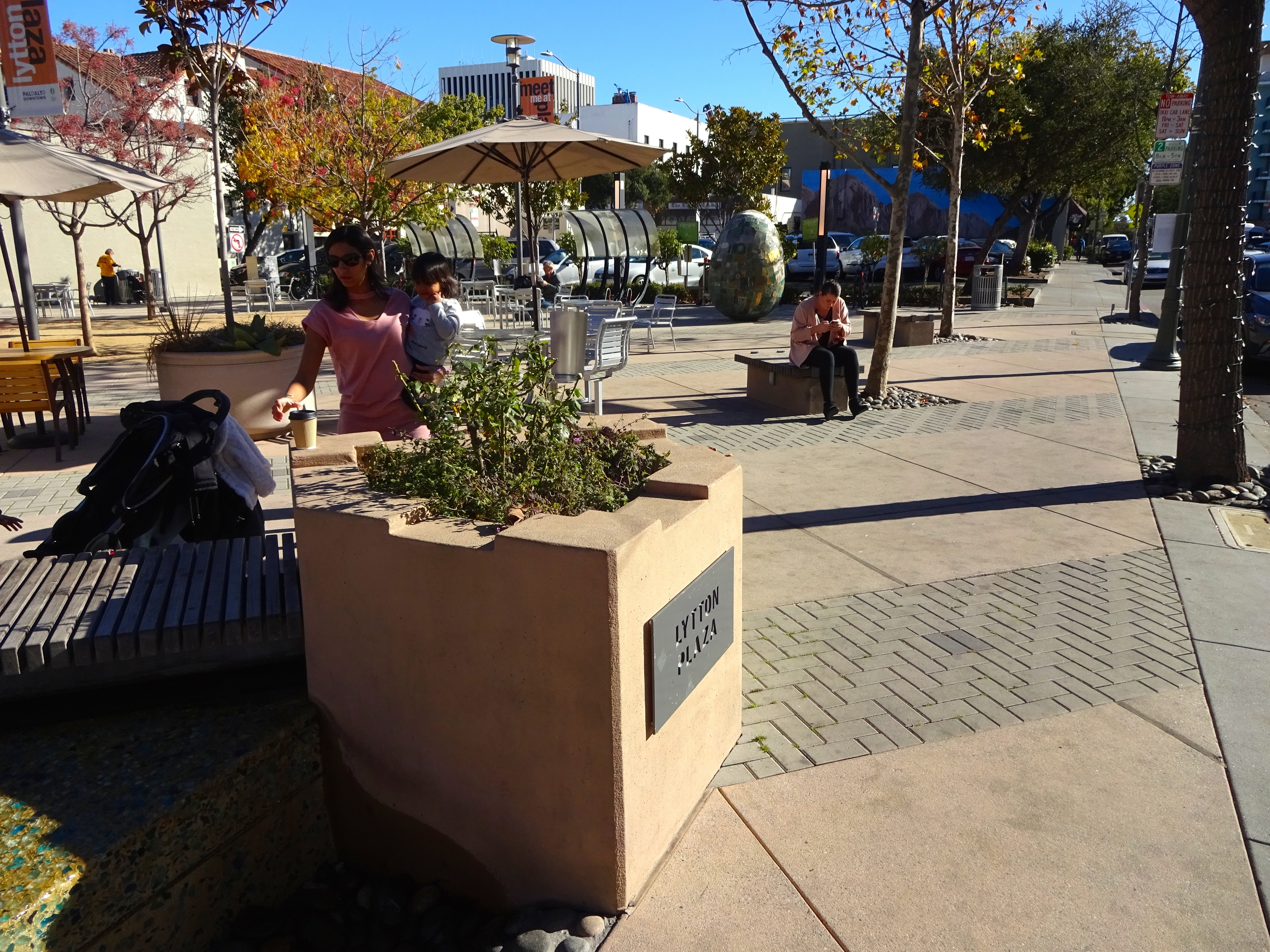
Lytton Plaza, with Digital DNA still installed

Lytton Plaza was created by Lytton Savings on a vacant lot next to the former Savings and Loan. During the 1960s, the plaza was the site of free rock concerts, noise complaints, anti-war demonstrations, and confrontations with police. The plaza was eventually purchased by the City of Palo Alto.

== Design ==
Digital DNA is a seven-foot-tall (by five feet across) egg-shaped sculpture with recycled computer silicon circuit boards applied to polystyrene bead foam with an epoxy fiberglass skin, and finished with UV resistant polyurethane clear automotive paint. Sewn into the surface are phrases relating to technology in many languages (Arabic, Russian, French, Italian, Portuguese, Japanese, etc.).

The "egg" is meant to recognize Palo Alto as the birthplace of Silicon Valley. Linda Craighead, Palo Alto Arts Center Director, feels that the work represents "the power of technology to bring the world together."

== History and controversies ==
=== Thrown out with trash ===
Digital DNA was commissioned in 2000. In 2001, while moving from Palo Alto to San Francisco Varella used her shared garage to store unattached pieces of the artwork. Her neighbor mistook the unfinished work for junk, and threw it out. Varella lost six months of work.

The installation of the piece was originally scheduled for May 8, 2004, but was delayed due to changes in city policy regarding the hiring of city vendors. By June an installer had been hired, and Digital DNA was ready to be installed; however, a conflicting plan for the complete redesign of the plaza had been made public. Former Palo Alto mayor Leland Levy and real estate developer Roxy Rapp proposed a $500,000 revitalization of Lytton plaza. The design featured a central fountain, but did not include Digital DNA.

On June 17, the Palo Alto Public Art Commission held a meeting to discuss the future of Digital DNA in relation to the fountain plan. Levy and Rapp requested that the installation of the artwork be further delayed until their proposal was formally presented to the City Council. The Commission unanimously voted to study the fountain plan, but also reiterated their desire for the immediate installation of Digital DNA.

=== Destroyed by fire ===
Following the vote, Arts and Culture Director Leon Kaplan, the city employee overseeing the project, made a shocking announcement. About a month prior, on May 19, there had been a fire in the San Bruno warehouse where Digital DNA was being stored. 11 days after the original installation date, Digital DNA was completely destroyed.

Because the fire occurred after the installation of Digital DNA had been delayed by city staff, some public officials blamed its loss on city employees. Varella hired an attorney to investigate the city's liability for the loss. Suspicions rose that the fire had been masterminded to allow the fountain plan to move forward.

Insurance reimbursed the city for the cost of the lost sculpture. On August 19, 2004, the Commission voted to fund a second version of the artwork.

In late April 2005 Digital DNA was again ready to be displayed, however, the installation was slightly delayed due to weather and other factors.

=== Dedication June 2005 ===
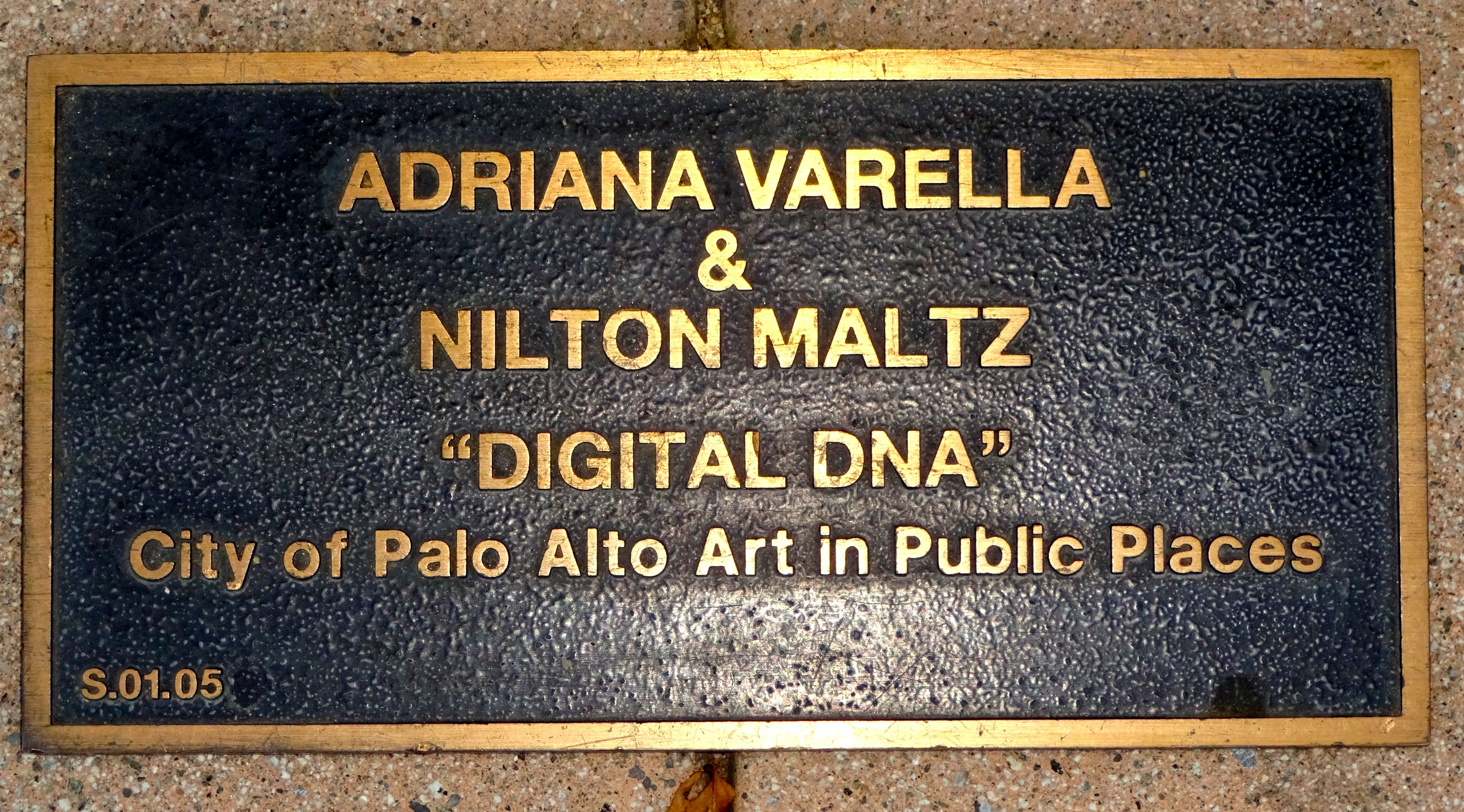
Plaque at the base of Digital DNA

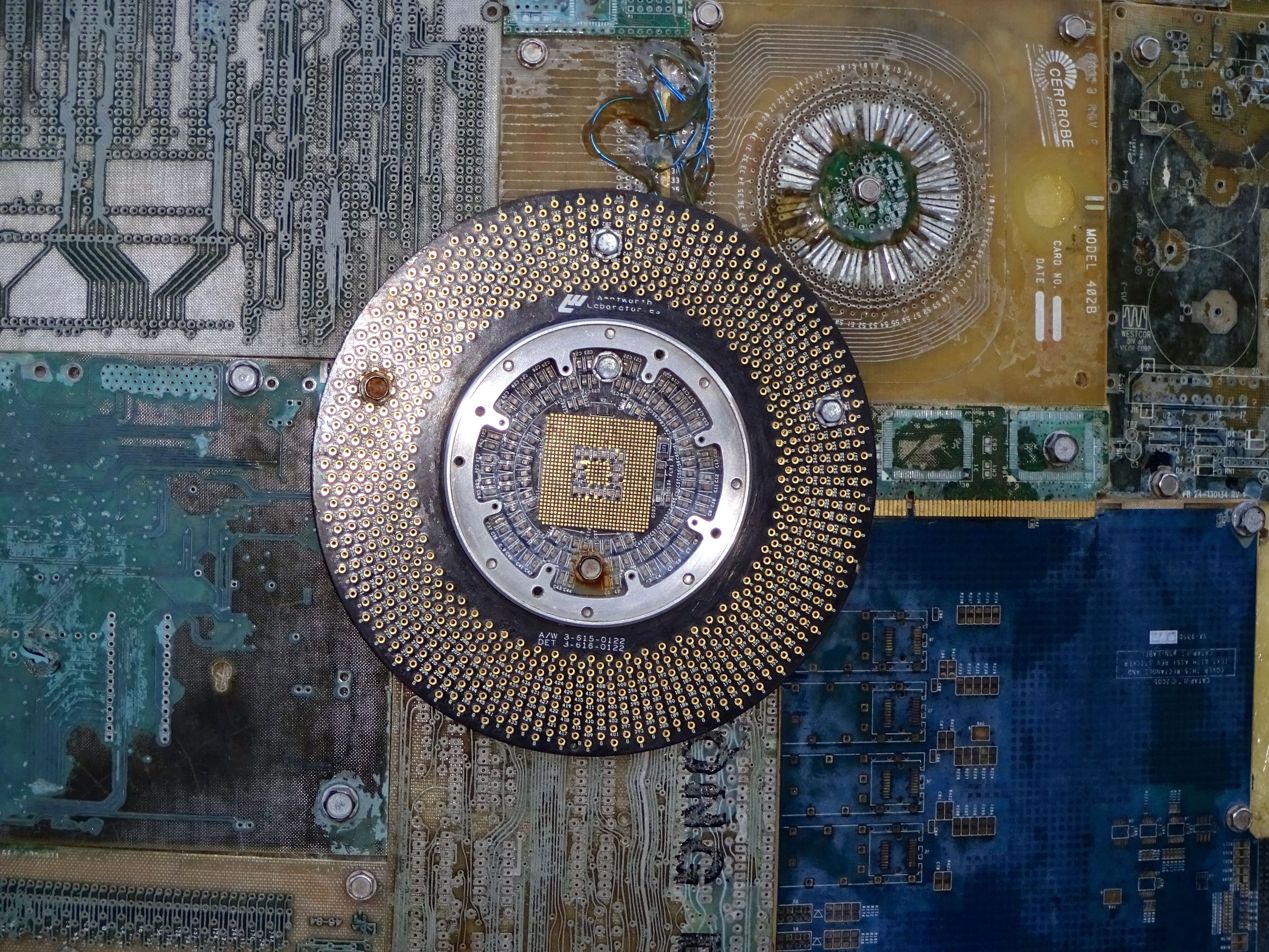
Printed circuit board on sculpture

The second iteration of Digital DNA debuted in Lytton Plaza in May, and was officially unveiled June 9–10, 2005 with a reception and dedication.

=== Vandalism ===
Two weeks prior to the unveiling, Digital DNA was vandalized. Six circuit boards were removed from the sculpture and several wires were pulled out, but Varella was able to repair the damages before the event. An earlier plan to install surveillance equipment in the plaza was reconsidered as a result of the vandalism. Police speculated that the crime was committed by drunken patrons of local bars.

In April 2008, a public-private partnership (including city staff, Levy, and Rapp) renewed the 2004 undertaking to revitalize Lytton Plaza with a large-scale redesign. The old proposal, which did not incorporate Digital DNA, was never approved. Levy expressed the group's desire to present a plan to which everyone can agree. According to Sunny Dykwel, a leader of the advocacy effort, Digital DNA is a beautiful piece of art, which they intend to protect.

=== Vote to remove ===
In August 2017, the city staff issued a report recommending removal, because of the cost of maintenance. The staff was concerned about the continuing expense of maintaining a sculpture that does not hold up under outdoor weather conditions. The staff tried, but failed to find a suitable location within the city, for displaying the sculpture.

In November 2017, the Arts Commission voted to remove the sculpture. In response, about 60 protesters gathered on December 7 at the sculpture. The artist wrapped the sculpture in a tarp labeled "CENSORED."

=== Removal and relocation to Harvard ===
In 2018, the sculpture was purchased by an anonymous art collector, who is also a Silicon Valley entrepreneur and a Harvard University graduate. The sculpture was removed from Lytton Plaza in June 2018. The art collectors wanted to have the sculpture repaired and restored. As of 2019, the Harvard Business School displays the restored work outside the i-Lab on Western Avenue.
