= Alimera Sciences =

American biopharmaceutical sales company

Alimera Sciences Inc.
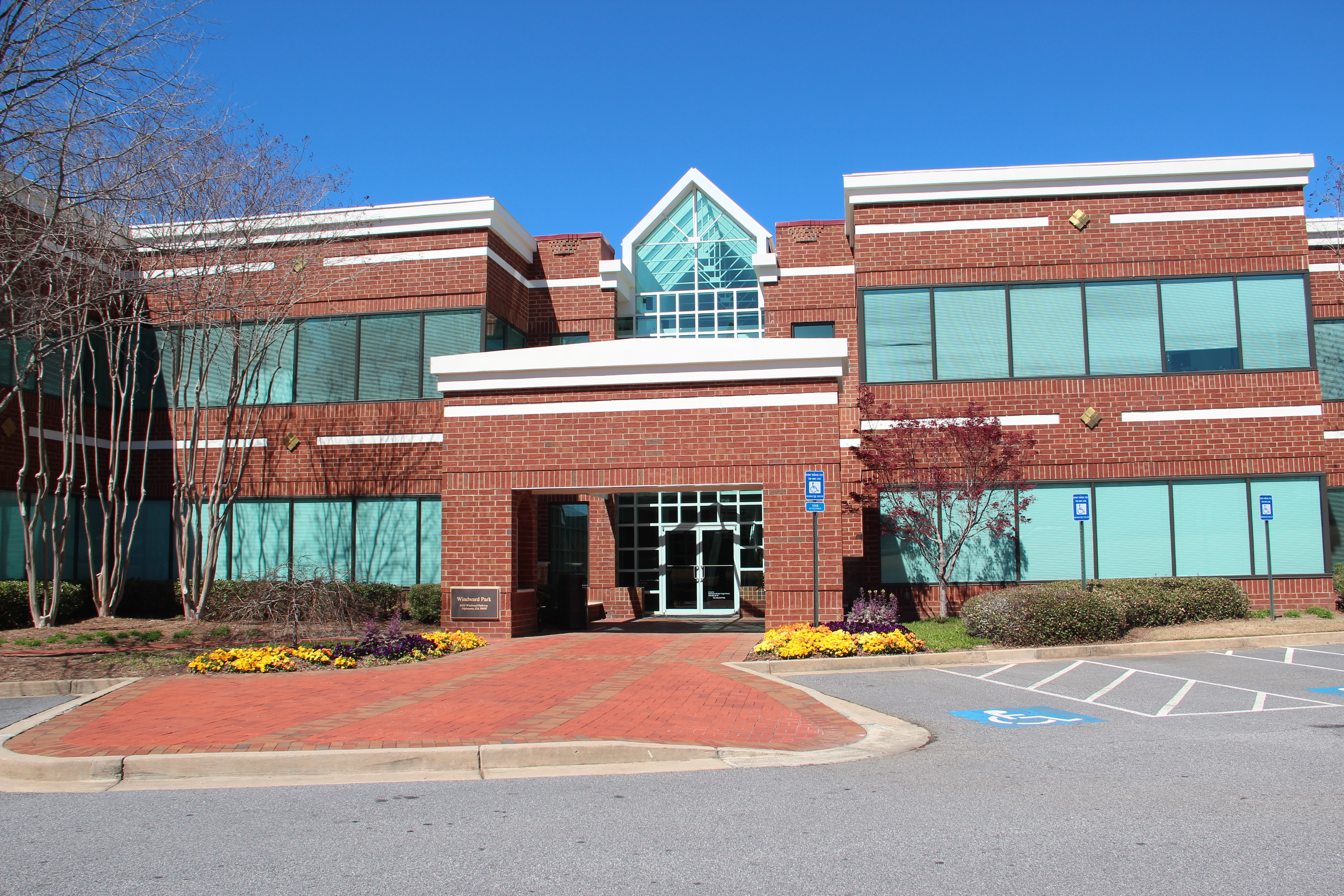
- Alimera Sciences headquarters in Alpharetta
- Traded as: Nasdaq: ALIM (2010-24)
- Industry: Pharmaceutical company; Health care; Biotechnology
- Founded: 2003; 23 years ago
- Defunct: 2024; 2 years ago
- Fate: Acquired by: ANI Pharmaceuticals, Inc
- Headquarters: Alpharetta, Georgia, US
- Key people: Rick Eiswirth, (president and CEO)
- Products: Pharmaceuticals
- Revenue: ▲$54.1 Million(2019)

Alimera Sciences, Inc. was a biopharmaceutical sales company based in Alpharetta, Georgia that specialized in the commercialization and sales of prescription ophthalmic pharmaceuticals. The company's main selling focus was on diseases affecting the back of the eye, or retina.

In September, 2024, ANI Pharmaceuticals, Inc. announced that it had completed its purchase of the company.

== History ==
Alimera was founded in June 2003 by Dan Myers, Daniel White, Dave Holland and Mark Testerman. Three of the founders were previously part of Ciba Vision Ophthalmics, which was renamed Novartis Ophthalmics following a merger.

In 2004, Alimera Sciences introduced Soothe emollient (lubricant) eye drops for people with dry eyes. Soothe was the first lubricant eye drop to feature Restoryl, a lipid restorative that works to re-establish the lipid (oily) layer of tears, promoting sustained moisture retention. Soothe was a mineral oil in water emulsion developed by Chris Brancewicz (then at Clarkson University) for Ocular Research of Boston from 1996 to 2001. Soothe was sold to Bausch & Lomb in August 2007.

In 2006, Alimera Sciences developed and submitted for U.S. Food and Drug Administration approval an application for a prescription to over-the-counter drug switch of 0.025% ketotifen fumarate, for the temporary relief of ocular itch. This product, Alaway, was approved by the Food and Drug Administration in December 2006 and was sold along with a potential future line extension to Bausch & Lomb, which began marketing Alaway in spring 2007.

The company's licensed product, Iluvien, is a sustained release intravitreal implant that delivers sub-microgram levels of fluocinolone acetonide for 36 months. Alimera conducted two phase 3 clinical trials for Iluvien involving 956 patients in sites across the United States, Canada, Europe and India to assess the efficacy and safety of Iluvien at two dose levels. The company submitted the Iluvien new drug application to the FDA in June 2010 and was granted priority review in August 2010. In December 2010, November 2011, and October 2013 the Food and Drug Administration issued complete response letters stating that it was unable to approve a new drug application for Iluvien. Alimera met with the Food and Drug Administration in December 2013 and entered into labeling discussions. As a result, the company plans to refile with the FDA in early 2014.

In July 2010, a marketing authorization application for Iluvien was submitted to seven European countries via the Decentralized Regulatory Procedure with the United Kingdom’s Medicines and Healthcare products Regulatory Agency serving as the Reference Member State. The six Concerned Member States include Austria, France, Germany, Italy, Spain and Portugal.

In February 2012, based on a consensus arrived upon by the Reference Member State and the Concerned Member States, the Medicines and Healthcare products Regulatory Agency issued its Final Assessment Report that Iluvien is approvable. The company was tasked with seeking individual marketing authorizations in each of the seven countries. As of January 2014, Iluvien has been approved in Austria, France, Germany, Portugal, Spain, and the U.K. for the treatment of vision impairment associated with chronic diabetic macular edema considered insufficiently responsive to available therapies. In April 2013, Alimera began selling Iluvien in Germany and the UK, and intended to begin selling in France in 2014. Iluvien is available through the U.K. National Health Service. Alimera filed with the Medicines and Healthcare Products Regulatory Agency in the U.K. as the Reference Member State for 10 additional European Union (EU) country approvals through the Mutual Recognition Procedure.

In 2019, the U.K.'s National Institute for Health and Care Excellence has recommended funding for Iluvien as treatment for noninfectious posterior uveitis. The drug has also been indicated for and funded for the treatment of diabetic macular edema in the United Kingdom.

== See also ==
- pSivida, licensor of Iluvien
