= Ample Hills =

Ice cream company

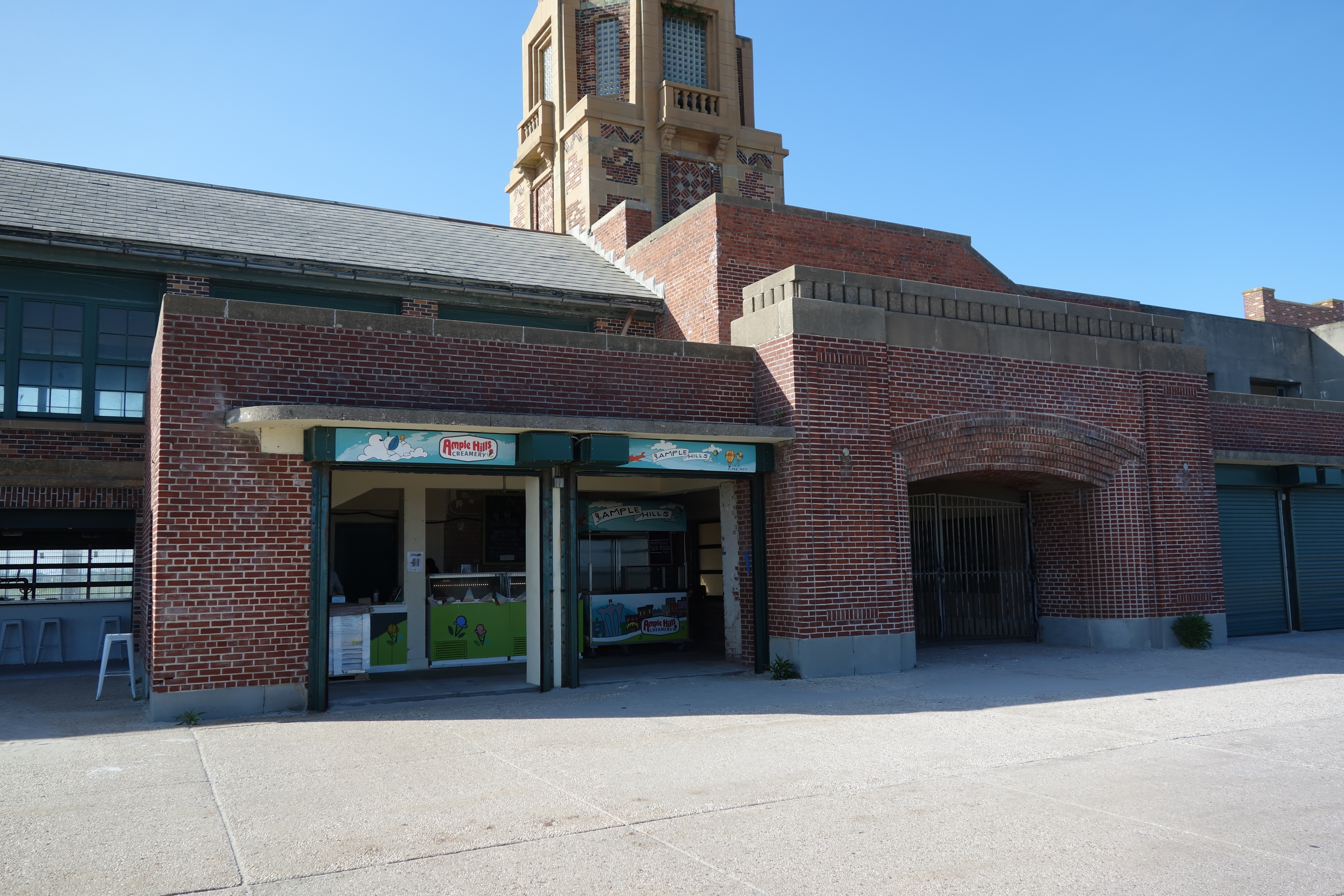
- An Ample Hills store at Jacob Riis Park in New York.
- Industry: Ice cream
- Founded: 2010
- Founders: Brian Smith and Jackie Cuscuna
- Key people: Lisa Teach (CEO)
- Website: www.amplehills.com

Ample Hills is an American ice cream company. Founded by Brian Smith and Jackie Cuscuna as a pushcart in 2010, the company became known for its "playful" flavors. Their first storefront, in Prospect Heights, Brooklyn, opened in 2011, selling out 130 gallons of ice cream in just 4 days. It soon expanded into a chain prominent in New York City, with additional locations at one point in Disney World and Los Angeles.

The company laid off all of its employees and filed for Chapter 11 bankruptcy on March 15, 2020 due to delays in factory construction, operating losses, and other self-described business mistakes. Schmitt Industries acquired Ample Hills from bankruptcy for $1 million in June 2020, with the founders exiting a month later. Due to failure to pay rent and expenses, Schmitt Industries closed all Ample Hills locations on December 19, 2022.

The founders (Smith and Cuscuna) signed a lease to open a new ice cream company and shop, the Social, in March 2021, backed by investors including Norm Brodsky. Backed by these investors, they bought Ample Hills back for $150,000 in June 2023 and brought in CEO and investor Lisa Teach. However, by late 2023, the pair were fired from the company, after clashes with Teach.

The Ample Hills story has been used for several Harvard Business School case studies by Thomas Eisenmann.
