= Clinton Street Baking Company & Restaurant =

American bakery and restaurant

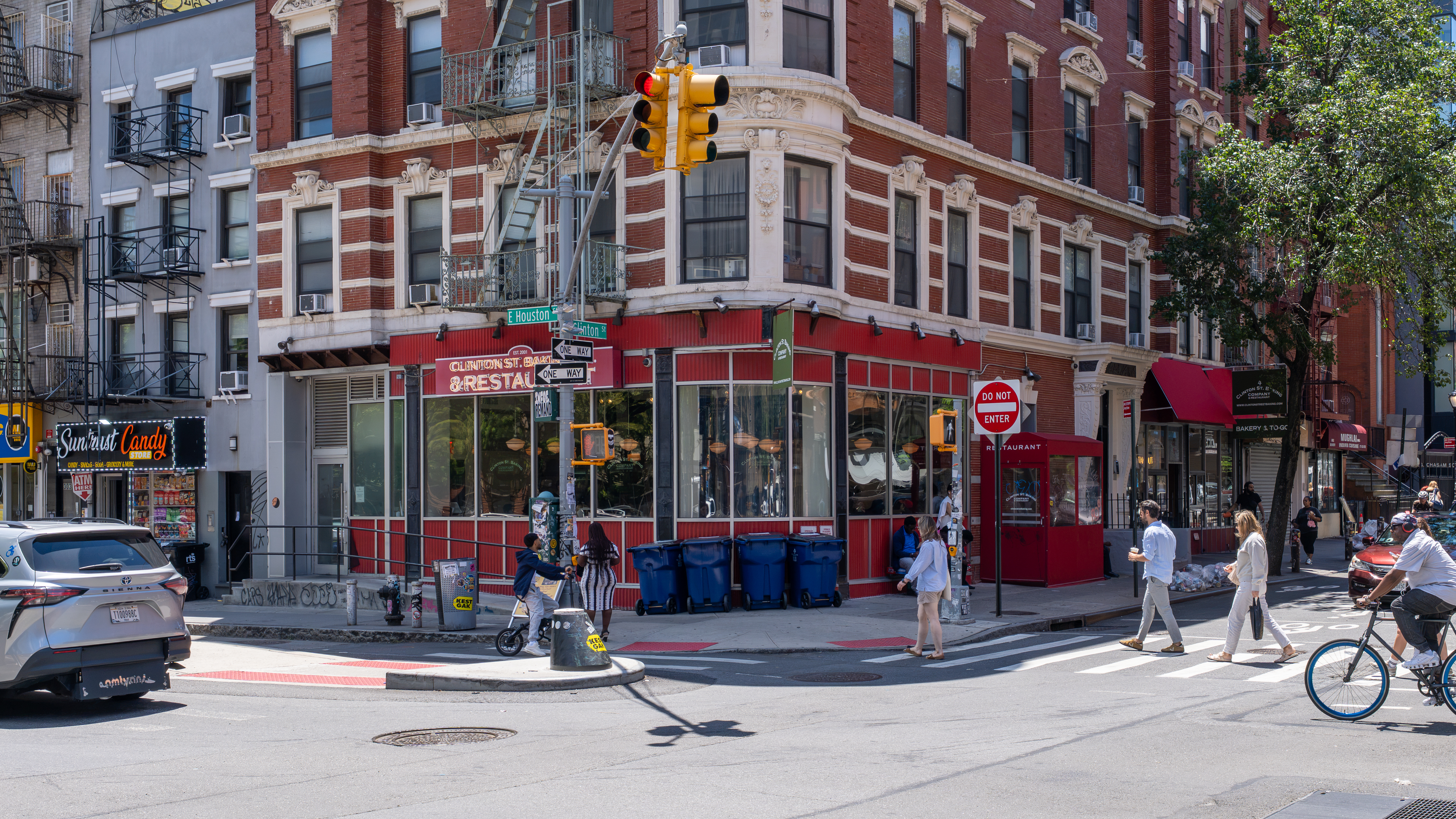
- Clinton Street Baking Company & Restaurant

- Location in Manhattan

Restaurant information
- Established: 2001; 25 years ago
- Owners: Neil Kleinberg & DeDe Lahman
- Head chef: Neil Kleinberg
- Food type: New American
- Dress code: Casual
- Location: 4 Clinton Street (between Houston Street and Stanton Street), on the Lower East Side, New York City, New York, 10002, United States
- Coordinates: 40.7213°N 73.9838°W
- Seating capacity: 32
- Other locations: Sister restaurant: Community Food and Juice in Morningside Heights, New York City
- Website: clintonstreetbaking.com

The Clinton Street Baking Company & Restaurant (CSBC) is an American bakery and restaurant. It is located at 4 Clinton Street (between East Houston Street and Stanton Street), on the Lower East Side of Manhattan, New York.

The restaurant is noted especially for its pancakes, its burgers, and its biscuits and other fresh-baked goods. In December 2010, The New York Times described it as a "brunch magnet", and The New York Daily News said the "legendary" dining destination was "the city's hottest breakfast nook". Time called it a "cult favorite". In 2011, Poor Taste Magazine rated it # 1 in its list of the 100 Best Brunch Spots in America.

== Restaurant ==
The restaurant seats 32 people. It is located on Clinton Street, just off Houston Street, which the New York magazine described as the "hippest restaurant row" on the Lower East Side. The restaurant is next to an 1853 Romanesque Revival traditional synagogue, Congregation Chasam Sopher. It attracts a weekend brunch line that stretches around the corner of the block, which includes New York foodies and many foreign tourists.

=== Menu ===
The restaurant serves refined comfort food and baked items, which are made daily on its premises, with breakfast (which it serves all day), lunch, brunch, and dinner.

Among the items that it is known for are its blueberry pancakes. New York magazine called them the best pancakes in town. February is "Pancake Month" at the restaurant.

It is also noted for its fluffy buttermilk biscuit sandwich with home-made tomato jam, and lauded for its baked goods, including its scones and muffins. Its home-made desserts, including muffins, organic apple crumb, chocolate cake, maple-bourbon-pecan pie, creamy pumpkin cheesecake, and cherry pie, are topped with ice cream from the Brooklyn Ice Cream Factory.

Its meals include cage-free eggs, omelets, granola, brioches, grilled organic free range chicken, buttermilk fried chicken, hamburgers, large warm buttermilk biscuits, cheese grits fries, salads, and market soups. Drinks include lime squash and bellinis.

=== Owners ===
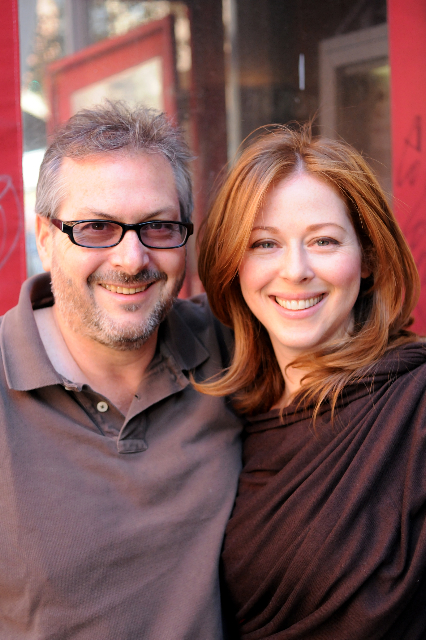
Owners Neil Kleinberg and DeDe Lahman

It is owned by a husband-and-wife team of restaurateurs, seasoned chef Neil Kleinberg and DeDe Lahman. Kleinberg had originally planned to open the business with another partner, but Lahman, who was a former advice columnist and a freelance writer at the time running an apparel company, bought the partner out. Kleinberg has responsibility for the restaurant's kitchen. Lahman is the restaurant's catering director and handles back-end responsibilities such as public relations.

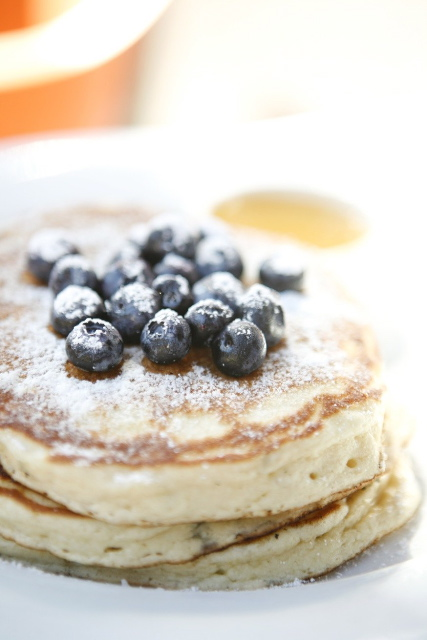
CSBC blueberry pancakes

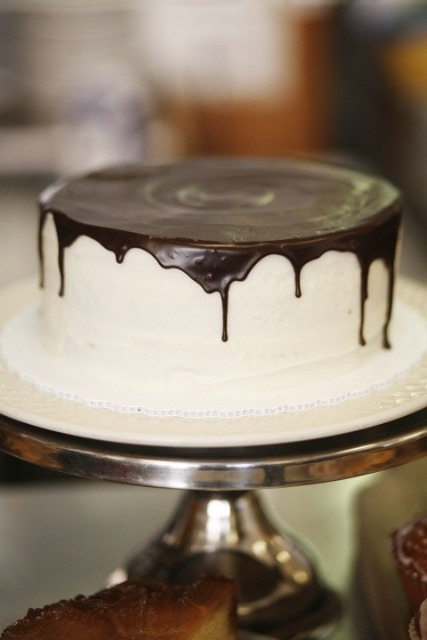
CSBC black-and-white cake

=== History ===
The restaurant began in 2001 as a bakery and a small coffee cafe, and over time became a full-fledged seven-days-a-week restaurant with a liquor license. Kleinberg and Lahman host free cooking and healthy eating classes at the restaurant for neighborhood children.

=== Awards and accolades ===
In December 2010, The New York Times described it as a "brunch magnet", and The New York Daily News said that the "legendary" dining destination was "the city's hottest breakfast nook". Time called it a "cult favorite". The restaurant has been one of Zagat's top picks on the Lower East Side.

Time magazine cited it for having New York City's best pancakes in both 2005 and 2008. The restaurant is noted especially for its fresh-baked goods. USA Today described it as a "charming cafe with outstanding cherry pie".

In January 2009, Bobby Flay challenged the owners of the restaurant to a "blueberry pancake showdown", which was filmed in an episode of Throwdown! with Bobby Flay at the restaurant. In 2010, Kleinberg won Godiva Chocolatier's SWEETest Challenge Award for his Warm Upside Down Pear Cake with pecan ice cream, caramel sauce, and pecan brittle at the third annual Food Network New York City Wine & Food Festival.

In 2011, Poor Taste Magazine rated it # 1 in its list of the "100 Best Brunch Spots in America". In 2011, Zagat ranked it 2nd out of 204, among traditional American restaurants in New York City.

== Cookbook ==
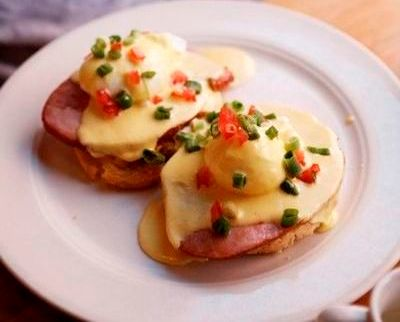
CSBC Eggs Benedict

The Clinton St. Baking Company Cookbook: Breakfast, Brunch & Beyond from New York's Favorite Neighborhood Restaurant (2010) was authored by Kleinberg and Lahman. The book includes what The New York Times describes as the "celebrated" pancake recipe served at the restaurant, as well as the restaurant's other most popular recipes for Eggs Benedict and other preparations. The book was identified by Julia Moskin of The New York Times as one of the year's best cookbooks, in December 2010.

== Sister restaurant ==
The owners opened up an eco-conscious sister restaurant, named "Community Food and Juice", that also serves American food. It is located at 2893 Broadway between 112th and 113th Streets in Morningside Heights, Manhattan, and has an open kitchen and a bi-level dining room.

== In popular culture ==
The restaurant and its pancakes are mentioned in the 2011 book Where I Belong, by Gwendolyn Heasley.
