= LabCentral =

Coordinates: 42°21′43.7″N 71°5′42.3″W

Lab Central, Inc.
- Type: Non-profit
- Industry: Biotechnology, Laboratories
- Founded: September 20, 2012
- Founder: Johannes Fruehauf, Peter Parker, Tim Rowe
- Headquarters: 700 Main Street, Cambridge, Massachusetts, United States
- Key people: Johannes Fruehauf, MD PhD (CEO, Founder); Peter Parker (Founder); Margaret O’Toole (COO)
- Website: labcentral.org

Lab Central, Inc., also known as LabCentral, is a non-profit organization started in November 2013. Operating over 225,000 sq. feet in Cambridge and on the Harvard University campus, LabCentral offers a network of fully permitted laboratory and office spaces for as many as 125 biotech start-ups comprising approximately 1000 scientists and entrepreneurs in the heart of Kendall Square. Additionally, LabCentral is committed to creating a more sustainable and inclusive biotech system supporting developments in STEM, workforce training, and next generation entrepreneurship through its LabCentral Ignite initiative. LabCentral is also home to Gallery 1832 which engages the local community to celebrate artistic innovation.

As a non-profit, LabCentral does not take equity in any of its companies. Its main sources of funding are revenues from laboratory and equipment rentals, as well as grants, donations, and sponsorship contributions. LabCentral officially opened on April 1, 2014.

== History ==
Co-founders Peter Parker of BioInnovation LLC and Johannes Fruehauf of Cambridge Biolabs, first thought of flexible, turnkey laboratory space for startups in 2006 while launching Cequent Pharmaceuticals with technology licensed from Beth Israel Deaconess Medical Center. After selling Cequent, they each established new ventures as residents of the Cambridge Innovation Center, a shared office space for startups established by Tim Rowe. In late 2012, Rowe joined Parker and Fruehauf as a co-founder of LabCentral, and with the help of Steven Tregay of Forma Therapeutics and John Harthorne of MassChallenge, created LabCentral with the goal of allowing entrepreneurs to pool resources.

On February 7, 2013, The Massachusetts Life Sciences Center announced that it awarded LabCentral a $5 million capital grant to fund LabCentral. Triumvirate Environmental also became a founding sponsor with a donation of 2.5 million dollars. Other early sponsors include Novartis Institute for Biomedical Research, Cooley LLP, Edwards Wildman Palmer LLP, and Johnson & Johnson Innovation. MIT Investment Management Company is LabCentral's real estate partner.

On April 4, 2013, LabCentral hosted a groundbreaking event at its 700 Main Street location in Kendall Square, Cambridge. Speakers included Governor Deval Patrick, Senator Mary L. Landrieu, chair of the U.S. Senate Committee on Small Business and Entrepreneurship, Susan Windham-Bannister, PhD, president of the Massachusetts Life Sciences Center, State Senator Sal DiDomenico, and MIT Associate Provost Martin Schmidt.

As of June 2013, LabCentral was approaching $10 million in funding.

In August 2013, LabCentral announced that Vaxess Technologies will be the first company that will move into the facility. Vaxess is a startup created by Harvard graduates who are working to commercialize a Tufts University technology that will stabilize vaccines so they can be shipped and stored without refrigeration.

In September 2013, LabCentral announced that Eppendorf North America became a gold sponsor. Eppendorf North America is a subsidiary of Eppendorf AG, the world's market leader in the field of developing, producing and selling products and services for laboratories.

In October 2013, LabCentral announced that Auxocell Laboratories Inc. had been admitted. Auxocell has developed a new method to harvest Wharton's jelly for use in various medical treatments. Conkwest was also admitted and is the first organization admitted to LabCentral that's working on treatments for cancer.

In November 2013, Life Technologies Corporation was announced as a major sponsor and American Laboratory Trading was announced as gold sponsors.

It was also announced that other organizations such as Bayesian Ventures and 121 Bio moved into LabCentral.

In March 2014, Boston Business Journal listed LabCentral as one of Johnson & Johnson's six bets made in 2014. LabCentral announced a sponsorship from Pfizer. The sponsorship allows Pfizer to nominate two startups per year to gain access to lab space at LabCentral. It was also announced that 11 companies currently reside at LabCentral but that 14 would occupy LabCentral by the end of April.

In April 2014, Governor of Massachusetts Deval Patrick helped celebrate the grand opening of Labcentral and announced a capital funding of $5M for LabCentral.

== Facilities ==
LabCentral's original 70,000 square-foot facility is located in an historic, MIT-owned building at 700 Main Street, Cambridge.

The company has since expanded across three core locations and is also the operating partner at the Pagliuca Harvard Life Lab. To accommodate demand for its growing startups, LabCentral opened LabCentral 610 (33,000 sq. feet) with support from Pfizer in December 2017. LabCentral opened an additional 100,000 sq. feet of shared laboratory and office space in Fall 2021 at 238 Main Street. Designed with a focus on process development and scale-up for biomanufacturing, LabCentral 238’s purpose is to facilitate company transitions from R&D bench-scale science into scalable production of pre-clinical material in anticipation of clinical and GMP manufacturing.

At its core, LabCentral offers fully functional lab space for as many as 125 start-ups comprising approximately 1000 scientists and entrepreneurs. The LabCentral locations are tailored to address the needs of growing biotechs at different stages of their development. Various equipment is available such as Mass spectrometry, electron microscopes, real-time-qPCR, flow cytometry, chemical hoods, centrifuges, biosafety cabinets and incubators, BSL-2-rated suites, High-performance liquid chromatography, and plate readers.

LabCentral services and offerings include equipment maintenance and technical support, co-working and meeting spaces, safety/compliance training, central waste handling, biosafety permits, events and programming, and business development assistance. On-site CRO support (FTE basis), logistical support, and group purchasing are also provided, as are other programs where pooled access reduces costs.

== Application and membership ==
Prospective resident companies apply via the LabCentral website. If the company is a fit for the LabCentral community, they are invited to pitch to a selection committee consisting of LabCentral’s senior leadership, co-founders and members of the board, as well as representatives from LabCentral's founding sponsors. Applicants with the highest potential are admitted to the community and placed at the site best suited to their needs.

Tenants, referred to as "residents", pay a $425 per month fee for membership per person. Benches begin at $3,000 per month. Private lab suites vary in price based on site and size. Additional office space costs $1,000 to $6,000 per month.
