= EyePoint, Inc. =

American pharmaceuticals company

EyePoint Pharmaceuticals, Inc.
- Formerly: pSivida Corp.
- Type: Public company
- Traded as: Nasdaq: EYPT ASX: PVA FWB: PV3
- Industry: Pharmaceuticals
- Headquarters: Watertown, Massachusetts, USA
- Number of locations: 2
- Products: Iluvien
- Website: www.psivida.com

EyePoint Pharmaceuticals Inc. (formerly pSivida Corporation) is a Watertown, Massachusetts company specialising in the application of microelectromechanical systems (MEMS) and nanotechnology to drug delivery.

pSivida obtained porous silicon technology from the British government Defence Evaluation and Research Agency (DERA, now QinetiQ). QinetiQ continues to be a strategic partner.

In June 2004, pSivida acquired full ownership of pSiMedica. In April 2018, pSivida purchased eye products firm Icon Bioscience. Afterwards, it rebranded to its current name of EyePoint Pharmaceuticals, Inc.

== See also ==
- Alimera Sciences, pSvida's partner on Iluvien
