= Thomas Eisenmann =

American economist

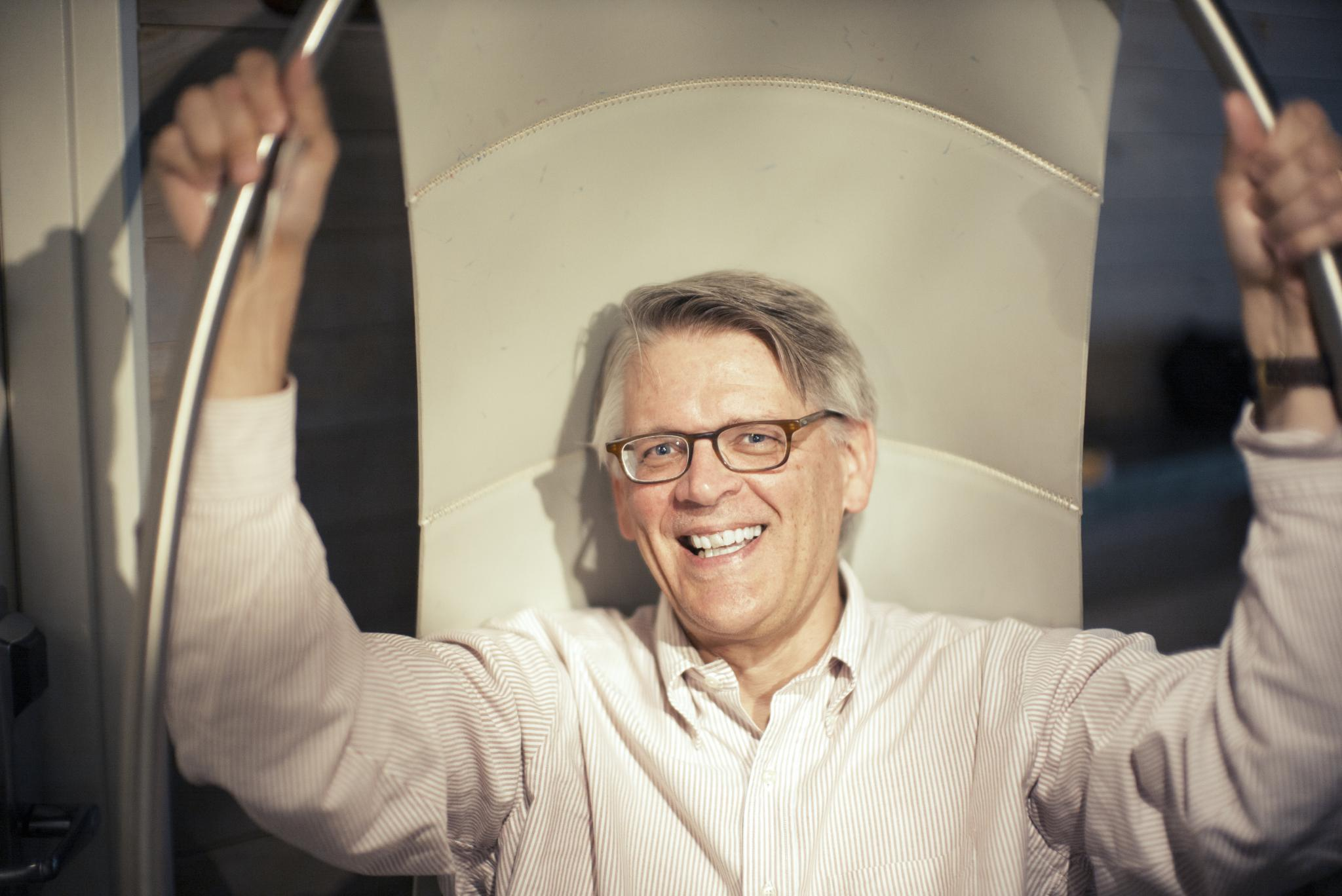
Tom Eisenmann (2014)

Thomas R. Eisenmann is an American economist and currently the Howard H. Stevenson Professor of Business Administration at Harvard Business School, the Peter O. Crisp Faculty Chair at the Harvard Innovation Labs, and the Faculty Co-chair of HBS Rock Center for Entrepreneurship. Eisenmann is also the author of the book Why Startups Fail.

Before teaching at Harvard, Eisenmann was previously a management consultant at McKinsey & Company, where he was co-head of their Media and Entertainment Practice.

== Education ==
- 1998, D.B.A., Business Policy, Harvard Business School
- 1983, MBA, Harvard Business School
- 1979, BA, Economics, Harvard College
