= Triumvirate Environmental =

American waste management company

Triumvirate Environmental, Inc.
- Company type: Private
- Industry: Waste management, environmental
- Founded: 1988 in Boston, United States
- Headquarters: Somerville, Massachusetts, United States
- Key people: John McQuillan Jr. (Founder and CEO)
- Website: www.triumvirate.com

Triumvirate Environmental, Inc. is a commercial waste management and environmental services provider company based in the United States.

== History and overview ==
Triumvirate Environmental was founded as a three-person Boston operation in 1988 by John McQuillan. It provides hazardous waste management services to Education, Healthcare, Industrial, and Life Sciences sectors. The company also provides chemical clean-up, field services, technical training and environmental consulting services. The waste-management company also transports and treats medical waste before extracting material for recycling.

Triumvirate Environmental is currently headquartered in Somerville, Massachusetts and has locations throughout the United States and Canada. In 2014, the company acquired Medical Waste Recovery Inc. of Jeannette, PA and Northern Plastic Lumber Inc. of Lindsay, Ontario. Present CEO of the company is founder John McQuillan.

In February 2025, a stake of Triumvirate was sold to private equity firm Berkshire Partners, valuing the company at $1.8 billion.
