= Alzheon =

- Type: Private
- Industry: Pharmaceutical
- Founded: 2013
- Headquarters: Framingham, Massachusetts, United States
- Key people: Martin Tolar, MD, PhD (CEO); Neil Flanzraich (Executive Chairman of the Board of Directors)
- Website: www.alzheon.com

Alzheon is an American clinical-stage biopharmaceutical company based in Framingham, Massachusetts. The company is developing medicines for patients with Alzheimer's disease and other neurological and psychiatric disorders.

== History ==
Alzheon was founded in July 2013 by Martin Tolar, MD, PhD, a veteran of Alzheimer's drug programs, who serves as president and CEO of the organization. Alzheon completed a $10 million Series A round of financing in April 2015 and started the Phase lb bridging clinical program for ALZ-801, which was completed in July 2016.

In August 2018, Alzheon appointed former IVAX President Neil Flanzraich, JD, as Vice Chairman of Board of Directors.

In August 2020, Alzheon was awarded a $47 million grant over five years from the U.S. National Institute on Aging, part of the National Institutes of Health. The grant is to support the Phase 3 clinical trial of ALZ-801 that began in May 2021

== Pipeline ==
Alzheon's leading candidate, valiltramiprosate (ALZ-801), is an oral prodrug of the active agent tramiprosate that targets neurotoxic soluble amyloid oligomers, and received Fast Track designation from the FDA in 2017.

ALZ-801 oral tablet is being evaluated in Phase 2 biomarker study in early Alzheimer's disease patients with homozygous and heterozygous APOE4 genotype.

ALZ-801 is also in Phase 3 clinical development for high-risk homozygous APOE4/4 patients with early Alzheimer's Disease. Patients with two alleles of APOE4 have up to 20 times the risk of developing Alzheimer's disease.

Alzheon completed a $50 million Series D in April 2022 and will use the funds to complete ALZ-801 clinical trials.
