= Puncture resistance =

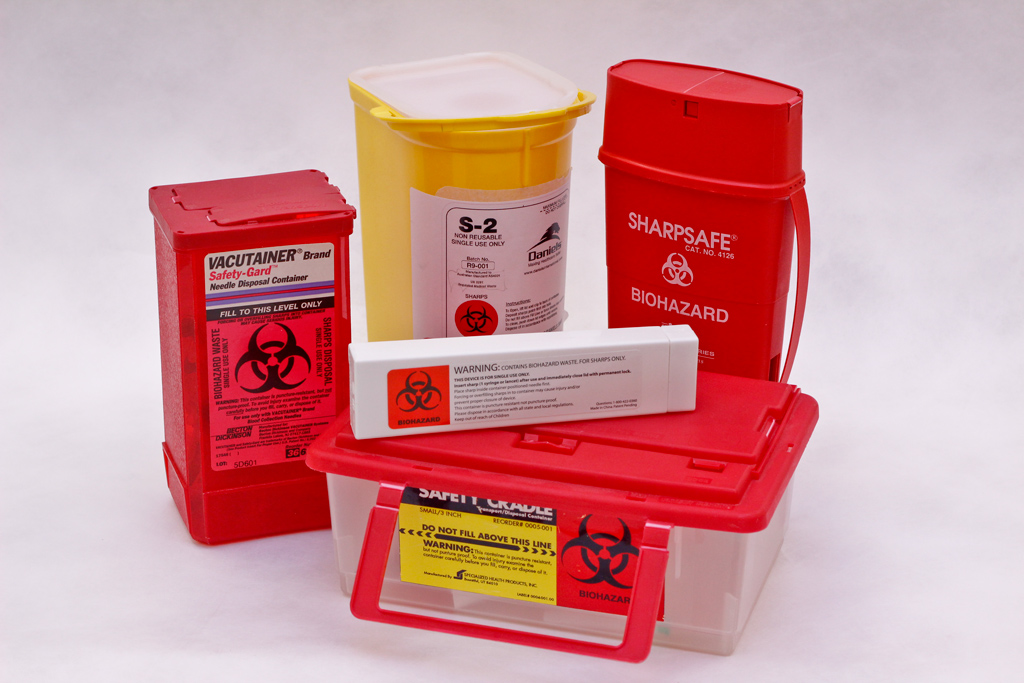
Sharp waste is put in puncture resistant containers to help protect medical personnel

Puncture resistance is the relative ability of a material or object to inhibit the intrusion of a foreign object. This is defined by a test method, regulation, or technical specification. It can be measured in several ways ranging from a slow controlled puncture to a rapid impact of a sharp object or a rounded probe.

Tests devised to measure puncture resistance are generally application-specific, covering items such as roofing and packaging materials, protective gloves, needle disposal facilities, bulletproof vests, tires, etc. Puncture resistance in fabrics can be obtained through very tight woven fabrics, small ceramic plates in fabric coating or tight woven fabrics with a coating of hard crystals. All described methods significantly reduce the softness and flexibility of the fabric.

The puncture resistance will depend on the nature of puncture attempt, with the two most important features being point sharpness and force. A fine sharp point such as a hypodermic needle will require a high ability to absorb and distribute the force to avoid penetration, but the total forces applied are still limited. The EN388 glove standard use a more pencil-like object with a flat tip of 1 mm diameter. The EN388 test is highly dependent on the materials ability to withstand high forces through high tenacity and to a lesser extent to avoid cut or separation of the material.

There is no or limited correlation between the protections provided in the low force/needle protection and the high force/pencil like EN388 test.

Needle-resistant materials as described above are generally pierced by a force between 2-10 N by a 25 gauge needle perpendicular to the fabric. The forces in the EN 388 test results are rated according to a score from 0-4 (0, <20 N; 1, 20 N; 2, 60 N; 3, 100 N; 4, >150 N). A newer test, ASTM F2878-10, is specifically designed to simulate common hypodermic needles in 21-, 25-, 28- gauge.

== See also ==
- Fracture toughness
- ASTM International
- Aramid
