= Thrombolytic Science International =

Thrombolytic Science, LLC (TSI)
- Company type: Private
- Industry: Biotechnology
- Headquarters: Cambridge, MA
- Website: tsillc.net

Thrombolytic Science, LLC (TSI) is a private, clinical stage biopharmaceutical company that was founded in 2006 based on the research of Harvard scientist Victor Gurewich into the potential use of prourokinase to break up blood clots. Gurewich co-founded the company and the founding CEO is business person Alexis Wallace.

TSI's lead drug candidate is a synergistic sequential dual therapy combination of mutant prourokinase (the precursor form of urokinase) and a small dose of tPA [Tissue Plasminogen Activator]. TSI is developing its dual therapy as a potential treatment for conditions caused by blood clots, initially for ischemic stroke and heart attacks.

The company completed a Phase I trial in The Netherlands in 2017.

The company raised $8 million by 2012 mostly from an undisclosed angel investor.
