= Valiltramiprosate =

Chemical compound

Clinical data
- Other names: ALZ-801; BLU8499

Legal status
- Legal status: Investigational

Identifiers
- IUPAC name: 3-[[(2S)-2-amino-3-methylbutanoyl]amino]propane-1-sulfonic acid
- CAS Number: 1034190-08-3
- PubChem CID: 25008296
- DrugBank: DB19191
- ChemSpider: 27819042
- UNII: GHG2B47067
- KEGG: D12218
- ChEMBL: ChEMBL4650301

Chemical and physical data
- Formula: C_{8}H_{18}N_{2}O_{4}S
- Molar mass: 238.30 g·mol^{−1}
- 3D model (JSmol): Interactive image
- SMILES: CC(C)[C@@H](C(=O)NCCCS(=O)(=O)O)N
- InChI: InChI=1S/C8H18N2O4S/c1-6(2)7(9)8(11)10-4-3-5-15(12,13)14/h6-7H,3-5,9H2,1-2H3,(H,10,11)(H,12,13,14)/t7-/m0/s1; Key:NRZRFNYKMSAZBI-ZETCQYMHSA-N

Valiltramiprosate is an investigational new drug that is being evaluated to treat early Alzheimer's disease. It is an amyloid precursor protein antagonist. Phase III results published in late 2025 suggested valiltramiprosate offered some benefit to certain patients genetically predisposed to Alzheimers, primarily when the drug was taken before those paients had developed dementia.

Valitramiprosate is being developed by drug maker Alzheon.
