= Skin disinfection =

Use of medical disinfectants to prevent skin infections

Skin disinfection is a process that involves the application of a disinfectant to reduce levels of microorganisms on the skin. Disinfecting the skin of the patient and the hands of the healthcare providers are an important part of surgery.

Skin disinfection may be accomplished with a number of solutions including povidone-iodine, chlorhexidine, alcohol based solutions, and cetrimide. There is strong evidence that chlorhexidine and denatured alcohol use to clean skin prior to surgery is better than any other commercially available antiseptic, such as povidone-iodine with alcohol.. Moreover, there appears to be a dose-response relationship whereby the concentration of CHX or PVI is related to the risk of infection.

Its importance in health care was determined by Semmelweis in the 1840s.
