= Vaxess Technologies =

Biotechnology company in Massachusetts, United States

Vaxess Technologies Incorporated
- Founded: December 18, 2011
- Headquarters: Kendall Square, Cambridge, Massachusetts, United States
- Number of employees: 42
- Website: Vaxess.com

Vaxess Technologies, Inc. is a company started by a team of four graduate students from Harvard developing a suite of vaccines on the MIMIX sustained dermal delivery platform that combines high temperature stability, improved efficacy, and simplified delivery to improve global vaccine access.

== History ==
Students Michael Schrader, Livio Valenti, Kathryn Kosuda, and Patrick Ho started Vaxess in December 2011, based on a technology created by David Kaplan and Fiorenzo Omenetto. Schrader graduated with an MBA from Harvard Business School in 2012. Valenti attended the John F. Kennedy School of Government. Kosuda had been a Harvard postdoctoral fellow in chemistry, and Patrick Ho had earned a J.D in 2012.

In 2012, Vaxess was awarded $25,000 from Harvard Business School for Harvard's Business Plan Contest in the Business Ventures Track. Vaxess Technologies was a semi-finalist for MIT's $100K Entrepreneurship Competition in the Life Sciences section. In 2012, it won the Harvard President's Challenge in the Global Health section and was awarded $70,000. The company was selected as a finalist for two 2013 MassTLC Awards, Start-Up to Watch and Innovative Technology of the Year: Healthcare/Life Sciences.

In May 2013, Vaxess received $3.75M in funding from Norwich Ventures and an undisclosed amount of money from angel investor Jeffrey Walker.

In August 2013, the company announced that it would be moving out of Harvard's Innovation Lab to a new location at LabCentral in Cambridge.

In December 2013, the Massachusetts Life Sciences Center awarded $1.5M to local startups. Vaxess received $1M of that amount which is the most that the MLSC's Accelerator Loan Program will lend to one organization. Vaxess's CEO Michael Schrader was quoted as saying, "The $1 million Accelerator loan will enable Vaxess to grow the company’s internal R&D capabilities and deliver heat-stable vaccines to patients around the world even sooner."

In January 2014, co-founder Livio Valenti was named by Forbes's 30 Under 30 in Science & Healthcare for his work with Vaxess.

In February 2014, Vaxess added George Siber, M.D. to their organization as the chair of their Scientific Advisory Board. Previously, Siber served as the EVP and CSO of Wyeth Vaccines. He also played a role in bringing Prevnar to market.

In April 2014, Vaxess announced that Thomas Monath, MD, and Russell Middaugh, PhD. would join the company's scientific advisory board. Monath being an expert in the field of vaccinology and Middaugh being an expert in the fields of in the fields of biophysical chemistry and pharmaceutical formulation.

In February 2015, Verizon announced that Vaxess had won one of the $1M Verizon Powerful Answers Awards. Verizon issued approximately $6 million is prizes to 12 different organizations across 4 categories. Vaxess won first place in the Transportation category, above HopOn and Matternet.

In March 2017, Vaxess announced the receipt of $6M in grants from The Bill and Melinda Gates Foundation to advance both an inactivated polio vaccine as well as a measles-rubella vaccine on the company's MIMIX platform. The grants will fund development of both the MIMIX platform as well as these two specific indications over the next two years.

In November 2022, Vaxess announced $27 million in Series B funding. In December 2022, the company announced initial phase 1 clinical trial results for its flu vaccine patch.

In 2023, Vaxess and AstraZeneca announced the development of a skin patch for mRNA vaccines focused on pandemic flu.

In May 2024, Vaxess announced $12 million in funding and named Rachel Sha as CEO of the company.

In May 2025, Vaxess announced $9 million in funding to advance its work in GLP-1, and . In June, the company presented new clinical data on the capability of its drug delivery patch to deliver semaglutide.

== Technology ==
Vaxess's business plan is based around a technology developed by Tufts University Professors Fiorenzo Omenetto and David Kaplan. The technology uses a silk-derived protein called fibroin to stabilize vaccines so that they can be shipped and stored without refrigeration, eliminating the need for the cold chain. Vaxess is working with vaccine manufacturers to develop heat-stable vaccines and targeting a product launch by 2019.
