= RapidSOS =

Technology company

- Type: Startup Company
- Industry: Public Safety, Software
- Founded: 2012; 14 years ago
- Founders: Michael Martin and Nicholas Horelik
- Headquarters: New York, United States
- Products: RapidSOS Connect; RapidSOS Safety; RapidSOS Portal; RapidSOS Premium; RapidSOS Integrations
- Website: www.rapidsos.com

RapidSOS is an intelligent safety platform that securely links data to 9-1-1 and first responders. It connects more than 600 million devices directly to 15,000+ first responder agencies.

Founded in 2012 by Michael Martin and Nicholas Horelik, RapidSOS partners with IoT companies to improve caller data accuracy in 9-1-1 centers. RapidSOS’ first product was the Haven mobile application. Since its foundation, the company has sent emergency data to 9-1-1 telecommunicators without users needing to use an app.

The company has introduced product offerings such as RapidSOS Safety, RapidSOS Portal, RapidSOS Premium, and RapidSOS Integrations. RapidSOS has working relations with companies like Apple, Axon, Uber, Google, Cove, Simplisafe, SiriusXM and MedicAlert to facilitate emergency response.

== History ==
RapidSOS was founded in 2012 by Michael Martin and Nicholas Horelik to address the 911 data challenge. Martin had a personal experience with 9-1-1 connection difficulties when his father fell off of the roof of his home in Rockport, Indiana, breaking his wrist and shattering his hip. Martin's father could not reach 9-1-1 from his cellphone and was lying outside in freezing temperatures until his wife came home and called 9-1-1 from their landline. Also, Martin cites an experience he had after first moving to New York City, when he was followed closely by a man who had intentions to rob him. In wanting to call 9-1-1, he states that he "realized just how difficult it is in the middle of whatever your emergency is to get out your phone, dial a number, and have a coherent conversation about who you are, where you’re located, and what’s occurring."

RapidSOS’ first product was the smartphone app Haven. The app gave users the ability to see family members' real-time locations, "check in" to send their location to their loved ones, and call 9-1-1 on behalf of someone else, sending that person's location and personal information to the dispatch center closest to them.

From 2012 to 2015, RapidSOS studied the data from over 12 million 911 calls. From 2016 to 2017, RapidSOS began testing its platform with location data, working with Emergency Communication Centers (ECCs) across the country. In 2018, RapidSOS worked with Apple to allow U.S. iPhone users who call 911 to automatically and securely share their location data with first responders through the RapidSOS Platform. By the end of the year, RapidSOS partnered with Google to send Android ELS data through the RapidSOS Platform as well.

In March 2023, American online and mobile prepared food ordering and delivery platform Grubhub announced a partnership with RapidSOS. Grubhub announced that the partnership will improve the safety of its drivers via sharing dynamic location data as well as caller ID directly to 911 responders when an emergency call is placed via the Grubhub for Drivers app.

== Featured products ==
RapidSOS sends information from IoT devices and apps to public safety during emergencies and anxious moments.

- RapidSOS Safety is 24/7 AI-enabled safety agent support for customers, employees, and communities.
- RapidSOS Connect is an emergency API for faster, more effective emergency response.
- RapidSOS Portal is a free solution that provides critical and vetted data to 9-1-1 telecommunicators from 500M+ connected devices, including real-time caller location, health profiles, vehicle crash data, and more to support their life-saving work.
- RapidSOS Premium includes all of the features of RapidSOS Portal, plus additional mapping capabilities and workflow enhancements to help 9-1-1 telecommunicators streamline emergency response.
- RapidSOS Integrations is a service that allows GovTech and public safety software partners to integrate life-saving data from the RapidSOS Platform with their software.

== Recognition ==
- 2016: Winners of 21st Century Communities Challenge by Utah Science Technology and Research.
- 2016: Consumer Technology Association's Innovation Entrepreneur Award.

== Funding ==
In November 2018, RapidSOS announced a $30 million Series B funding round, led by Playground Global.

In October 2019, RapidSOS closed their Series B Funding round of $55 million, led by Energy Impact Partners.

In February 2021, RapidSOS closed their Series C funding round of $85 million, led by Insight Partners.

In October 2022, RapidSOS closed additional Series C funding round of $75 million, led by Night Dragon, bringing the company's total raised to over $250 million.
