= Timeline of Cambridge, Massachusetts =

Coordinates: 42.373611°N 71.110556°W

This is a timeline of the history of the city of Cambridge, Massachusetts, United States.

== 17th century ==
- 1630 - English settlers arrive. Site selected by John Winthrop the Younger.
- 1632 - First Parish meeting house built.
- 1636 - The "New College" founded.
- 1636 - Newe Towne was established as a town in the Massachusetts Bay Colony on September 8.
- 1638
  - Newe Towne renamed "Cambridge."
  - John Harvard, a Puritan minister, bequeaths his library and half his monetary estate to the college.
- 1639
  - New College renamed Harvard College for benefactor John Harvard.
  - First printing press in Cambridge.
- 1640 - Bay Psalm Book printed.
- 1642 - Harvard holds its first commencement.
- 1662 - Great Bridge built.
- 1663 - Algonquin-language Mamusse Wunneetupanatamwe Up-Biblum God published.
- 1682 - Cooper-Frost-Austin House built (date approximate).
- 1685 - Hooper-Lee-Nichols House built.
- 1688 - Cambridge Village, later renamed Newton, separated from Cambridge.

== 18th century ==
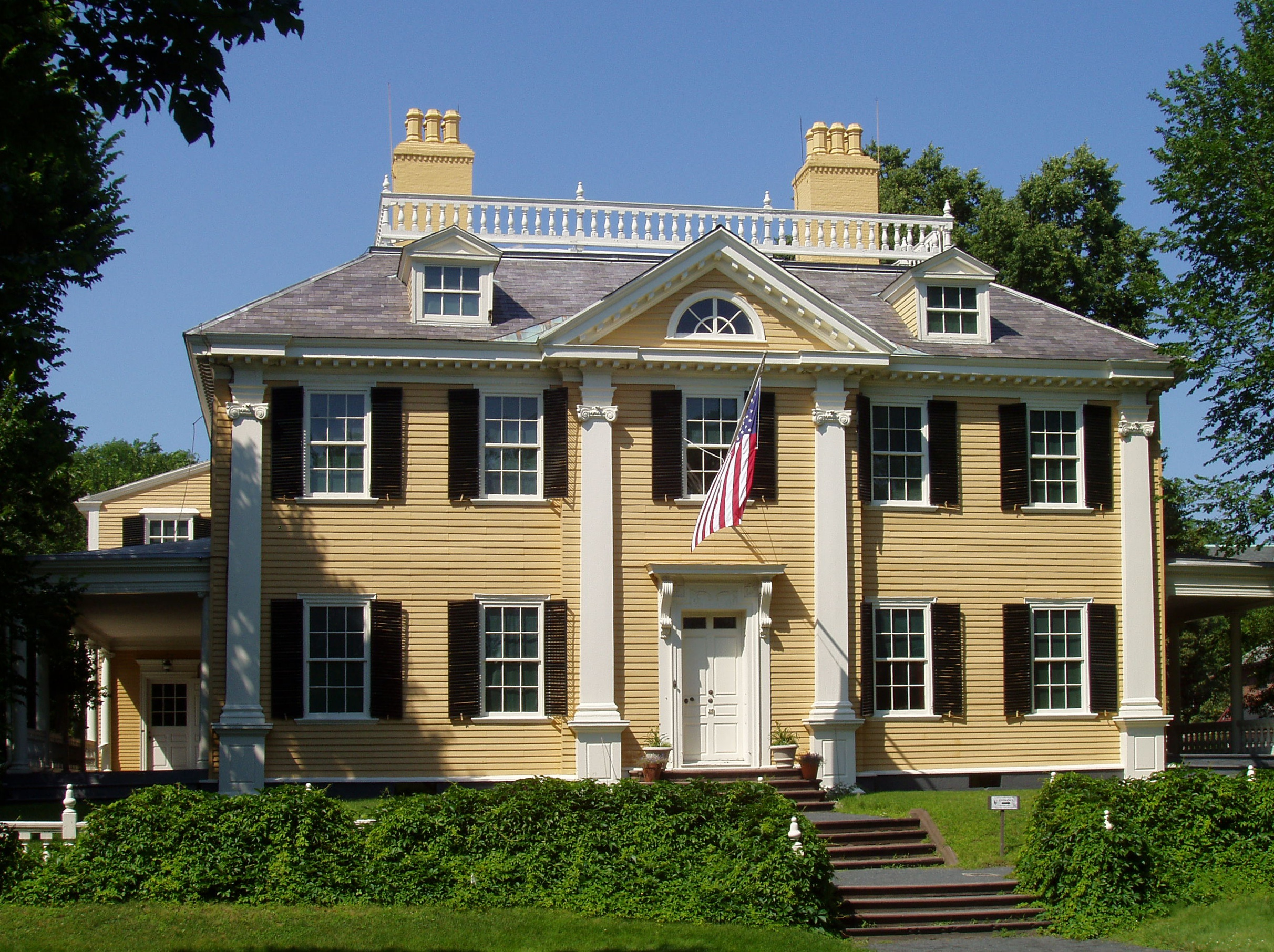
Longfellow National Historic Site, Cambridge, Massachusetts - also known as the Vassall House

- 1713 - Town of Lexington separated from Cambridge.
- 1720 - Harvard's Massachusetts Hall built.
- 1727 - William Brattle House built.
- 1759
  - Christ Church congregation founded.
  - Vassall House built.
- 1760 - Apthorp House built.
- 1767 - Elmwood (residence) built.
- 1775
  - April 18: William Dawes traverses the town en route to sounding warnings on eve of Battles of Lexington and Concord.
  - April 19: Skirmishes between retreating British troops and American patriots at Watson's Corner and elsewhere in North Cambridge.
  - May 12: The New-England Chronicle in publication.
  - July 3: George Washington takes command of American army.
- 1780 - May 19: New England's Dark Day.
- 1782 - Harvard Medical School founded.
- 1793 - West Boston Bridge built.
- 1796 - Fresh Pond Hotel built.

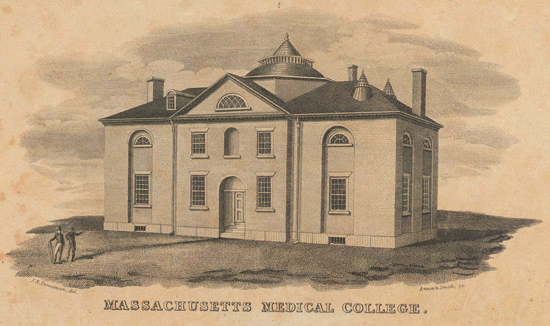
Massachusetts Medical College, Mason Street

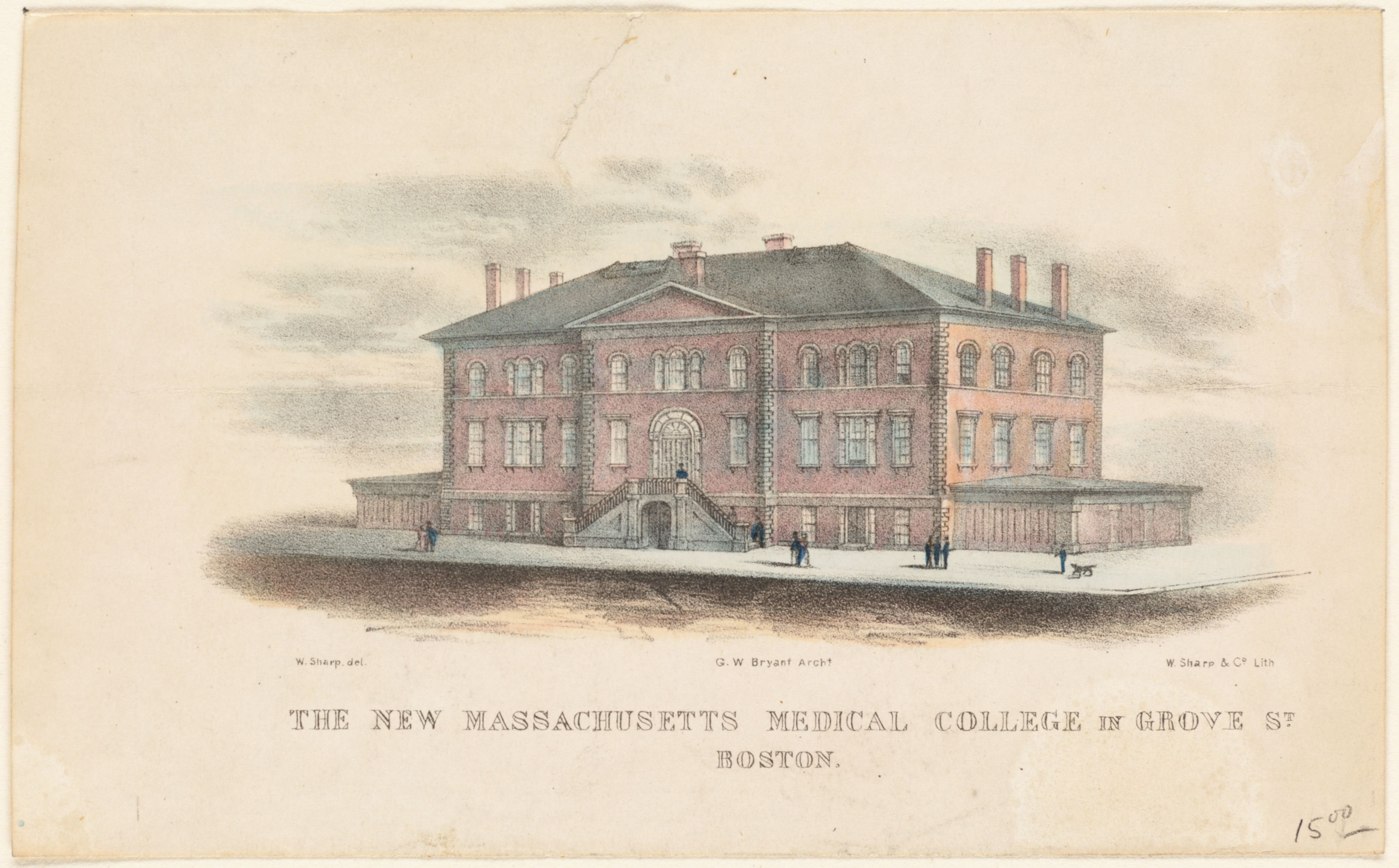
Massachusetts Medical College, Grove Street

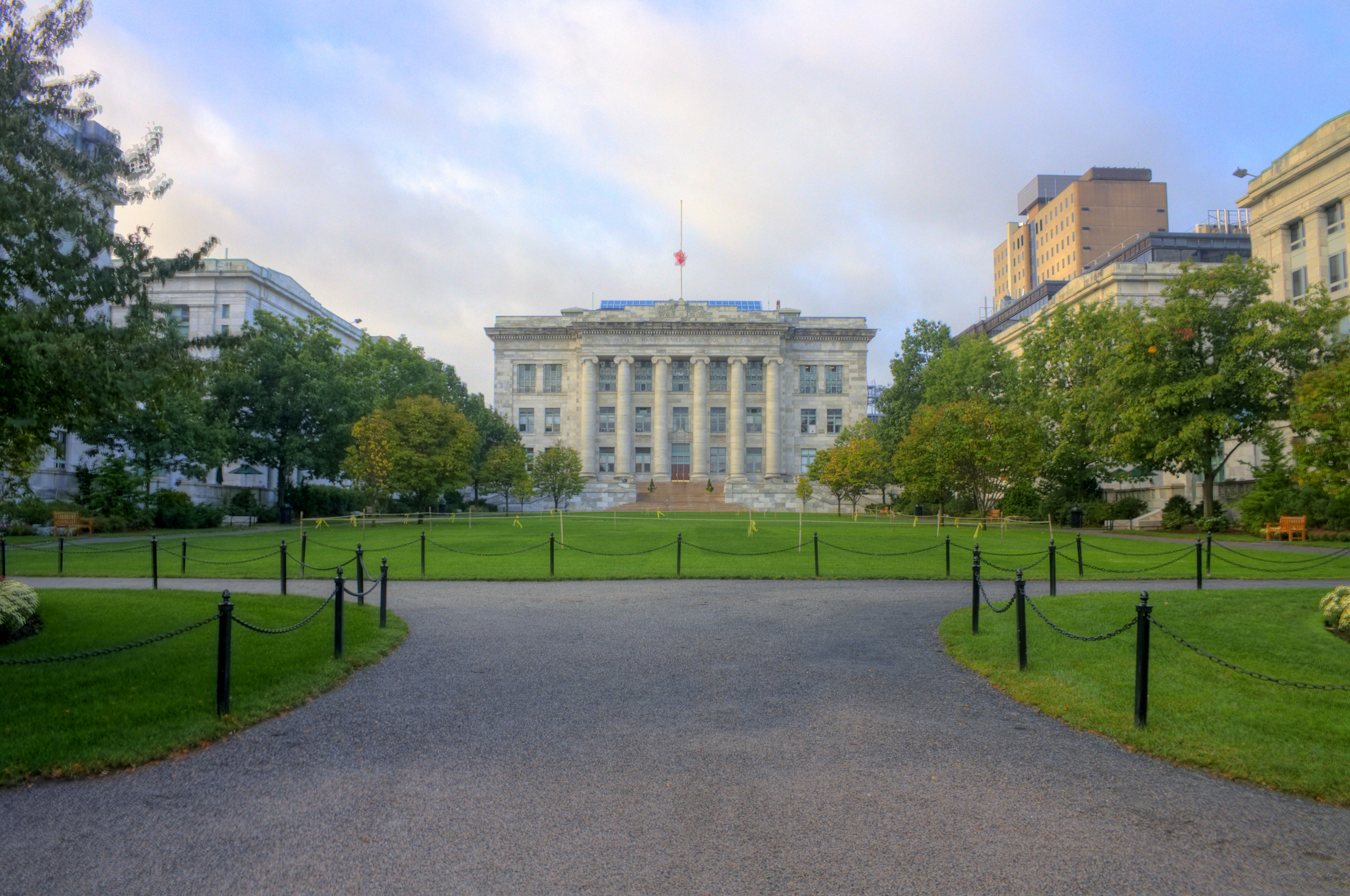
Harvard Medical School quadrangle in Longwood Medical Area.

== 19th century ==
=== 1800s–1840s ===
- 1800 - Printer William Hilliard in business.
- 1805 - Harvard Botanic Garden founded.
- 1807
  - Cambridge and Concord Turnpike opens.
  - Little Cambridge separates from Cambridge and is renamed Brighton.
  - West Cambridge, later renamed Arlington, separated from Cambridge.
- 1809
  - Craigie's Bridge opens.
  - Birth of Oliver Wendell Holmes Sr., physician, poet and polymath.
- 1810 - Amicable Fire Society founded.
- 1814 - Cambridge Humane Society and Female Humane Society founded.
- 1815 - Harvard's University Hall built.
- 1816 - Middlesex County Courthouse (Massachusetts) built.
- 1817 - Harvard Law School founded.
- 1818 - New England Glass Company established.
- 1824 - East Cambridge Charitable Society formed.
- 1826 - Frederic Tudor and Nathaniel Wyeth begin harvesting ice at Fresh Pond.
- 1827 - First Evangelical Congregational church and Second Baptist Church established.
- 1830 - Population: 6,072.
- 1831
  - Mount Auburn Cemetery founded.
  - Cambridge Market Hotel (later Porter's Hotel) built.
- 1832 - Cambridge Fire Department and Cambridge Book Club established.
- 1833
  - Hunt & Co's Circulating Library in business.
  - First Parish meeting house built, corner Church St. and Mass. Ave.
- 1835 - West Cambridge Social Library active.

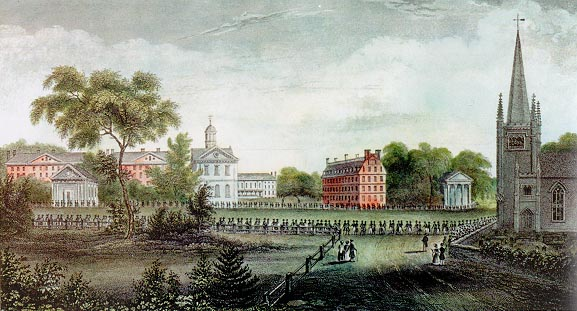
An 1836 illustration by the daughter of Harvard President. Harvard University. Eliza Susan Quincy's drawing of the September 1836 procession of Harvard alumni leaving the First Parish Meeting House and walking to the Pavilion. Eliza Susan Quincy was the daughter of Josiah Quincy, President of Harvard University 1829-45.

- 1837
  - August 31: Emerson gives "American Scholar" speech.
  - East Cambridge Anti-Slavery Society formed.
  - Henry Wadsworth Longfellow moves to Craigie House.
- 1839
  - Hopkins Classical School established.
  - Harvard College Observatory founded.
- 1840
  - Cambridge Magnolia begins publication.
  - St. John's Mutual Relief Society organized.
  - Population: 8,409.
- 1841 - Cambridge Lyceum organized.
- 1846
  - Cambridge Chronicle begins publication.
  - Stickney-Shepard House built.
  - Lexington and West Cambridge Railroad begins operating.
  - Alvan Clark & Sons telescope maker in business.
  - City chartered.
  - James D. Green becomes mayor.
  - Population: 12,500.
- 1847 - Great Refractor telescope installed.
- 1848 - Franklin Library Association founded.
- 1849 - Cambridge Athenaeum incorporated.

=== 1850s–1890s ===
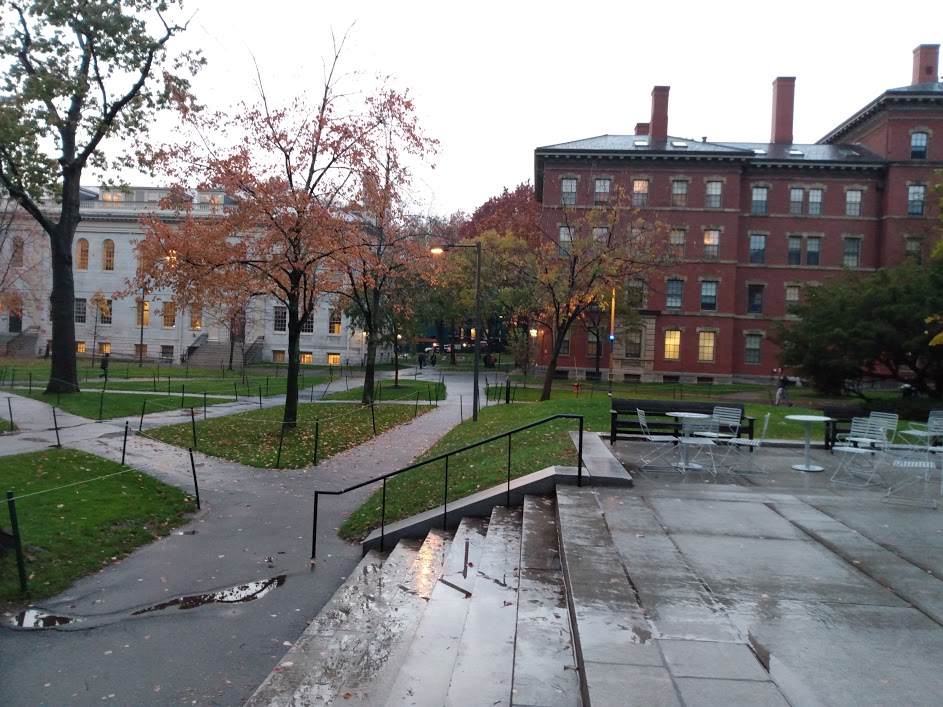
Harvard University, inside Harvard Yard.

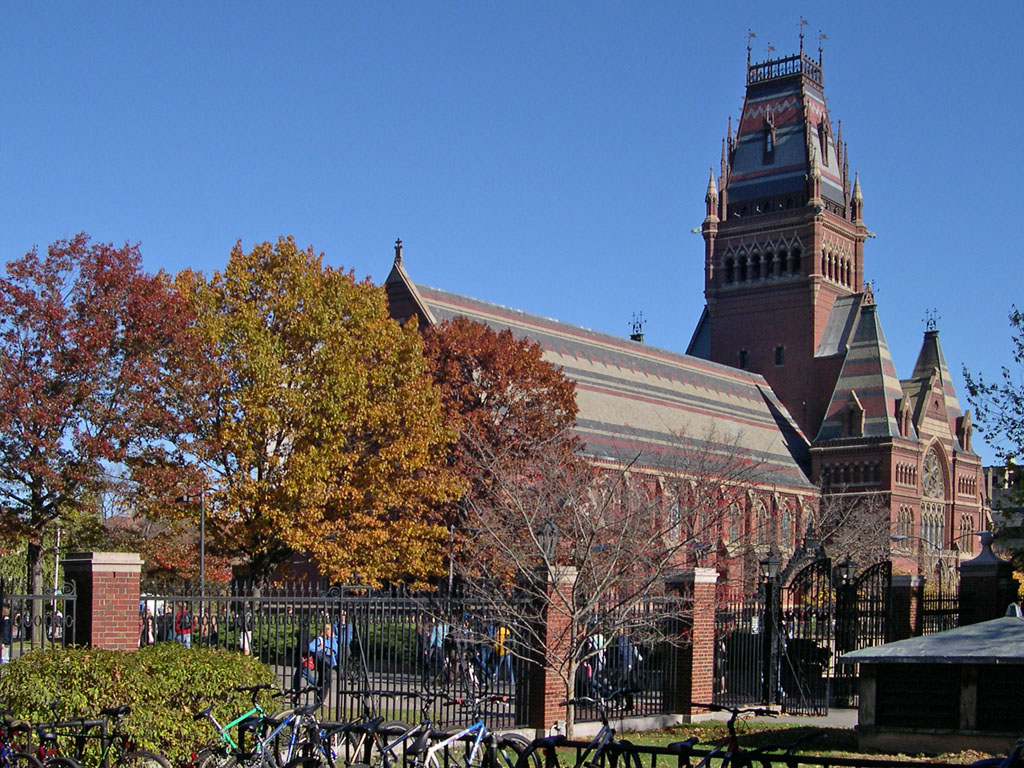
Sanders Theatre at Harvard University, location of many Glee Club concerts

- 1850 - Howard Benevolent Society organized.
- 1852
  - Cambridge Water Works Corporation chartered.
  - Riverside Press established.
- 1854 - Cambridge Cemetery consecrated.
- 1856 - Population: 20,473.
- 1857
  - Cambridge Circulating Library in business.
  - Walden Street Cattle Pass built.
- 1858 - Harvard Glee Club founded.
- 1859 - Museum of Comparative Zoology founded.
- 1860 - Cambridge Horticultural Society organized.
- 1861 - Veterans' Services established.
- 1862 - Sanitary Society active (approximate date).

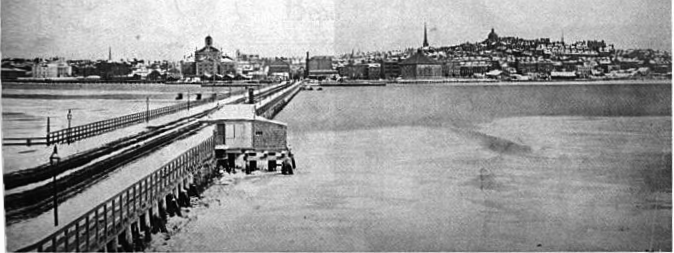
The predecessor West Boston Bridge, circa 1864. before the Longfellow Bridge

- 1865 - Old Cambridge Mutual Relief Society organized.
- 1865 - City acquires Cambridge Water Works
- 1866
  - Peabody Museum of Archaeology and Ethnology and New Church Theological School founded.
  - Cambridge Press newspaper begins publication.
- 1867 - Episcopal Theological School founded.
- 1868 - Cambridge Mechanics Literary Association organized.

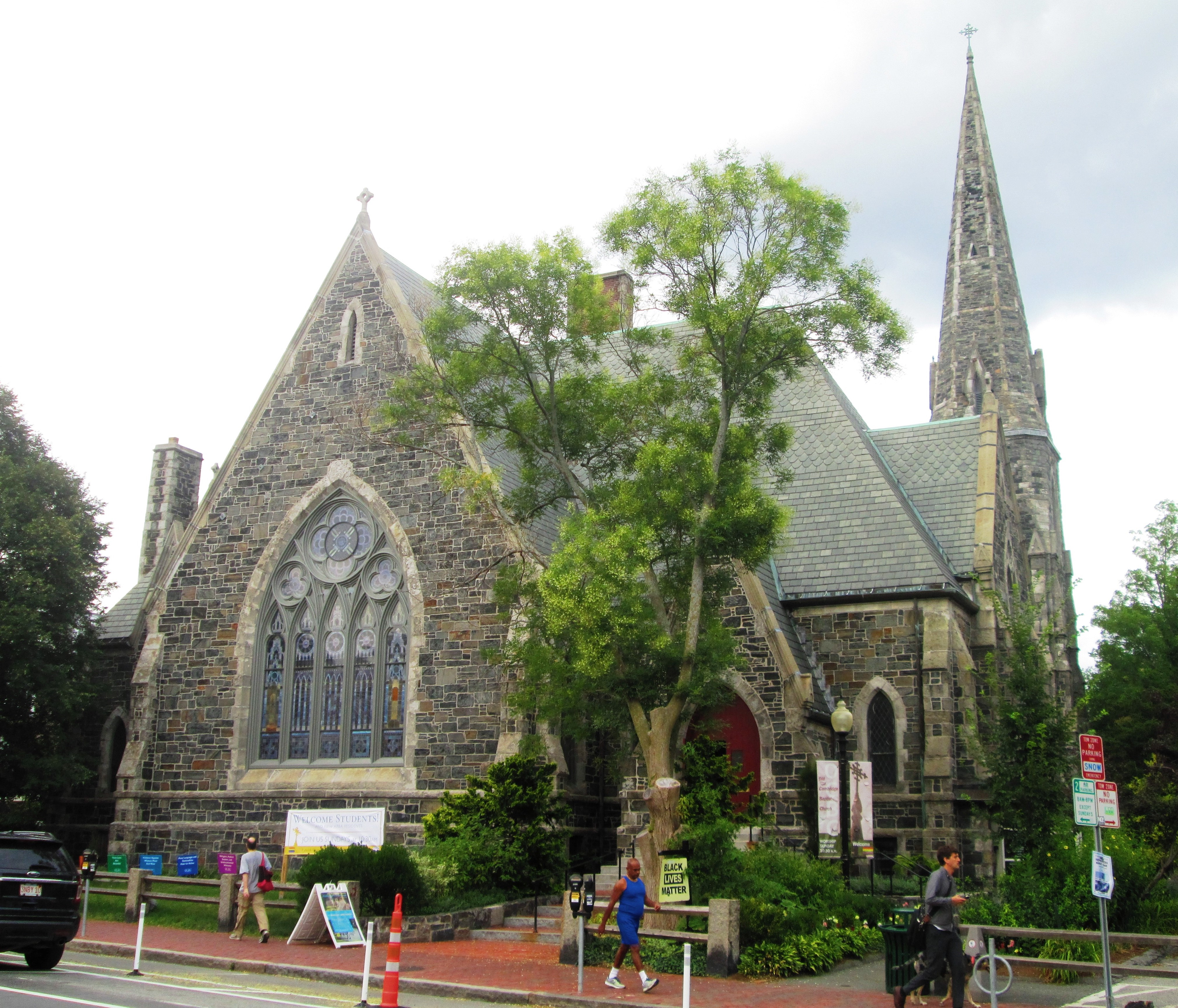
Old Cambridge Baptist Church from Massachusetts Avenue, Cambridge, Massachusetts.

- 1869
  - Old Cambridge Baptist Church built on Harvard Street.
  - North Cambridge Choral Society organized.
- 1870 - Soldiers' Monument dedicated on Cambridge Common
- 1871
  - Cambridge Social Union founded.
  - Alpha Glee Club organized.
- 1872 - Cambridge Choral Society formed.

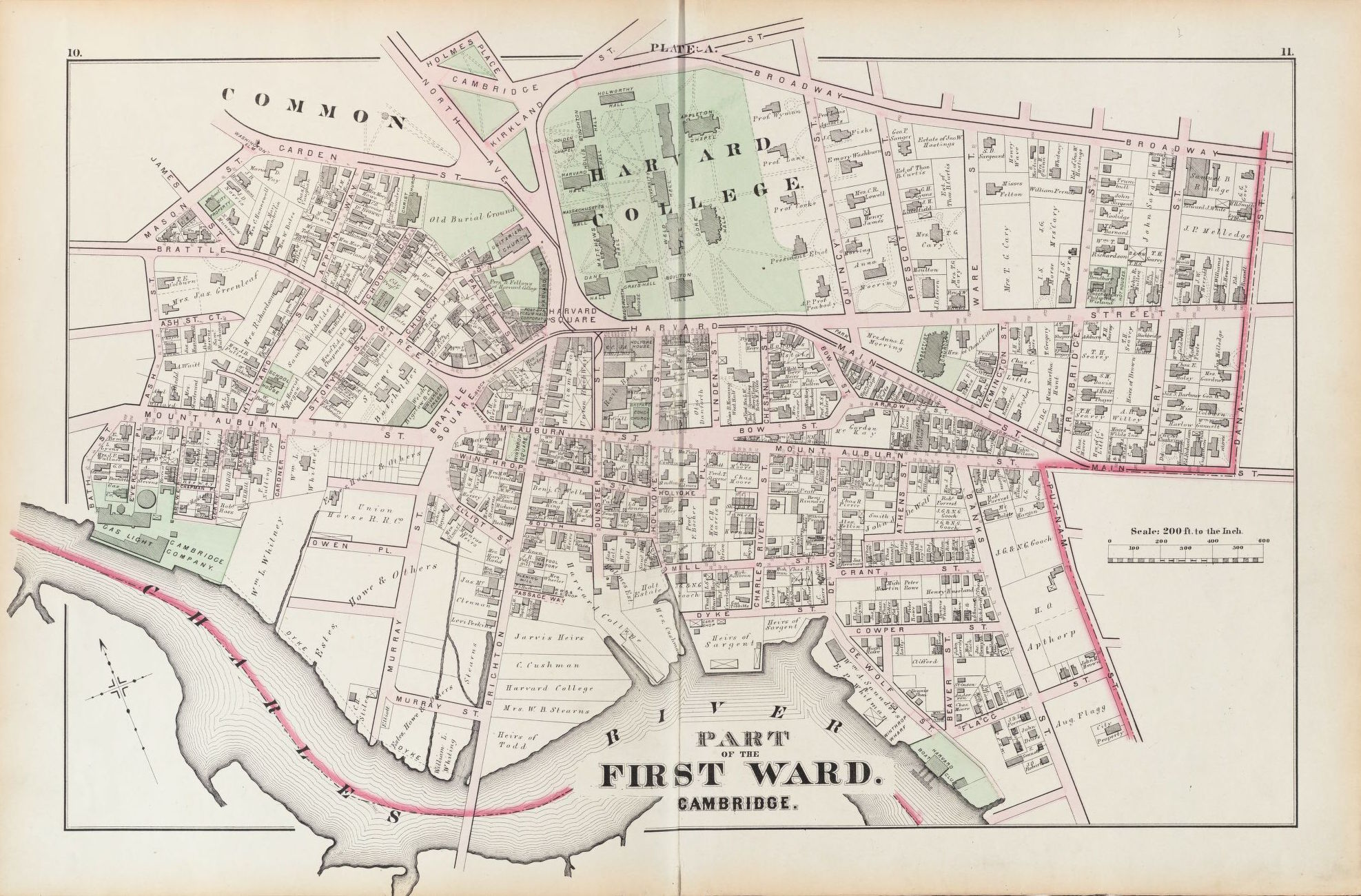
1873 Map of Harvard Square

- 1873
  - The Harvard Crimson newspaper begins publication.
  - Basket Club formed.
- 1875
  - Church of the Ascension organized.
  - Kennedy Steam Bakery built.
  - Population: 47,838.
- 1876 - Harvard Lampoon begins publication.
- 1877 - Harvard's Memorial Hall built.
- 1878
  - The Cambridge Tribune newspaper begins publication.
  - Harvard's Sever Hall built.
- 1879 - Cambridge Public Library established.
- 1880 - Population: 52,669.
- 1881 - Cambridge Club active.
- 1882
  - Society for the Collegiate Instruction of Women incorporated.
  - Harvard Cooperative founded.
- 1883
  - Cambridge YMCA opens.
  - Browne & Nichols School founded.
- 1884 - Odd Fellows Hall built.
- 1886 - Cambridge Hospital, Cambridge English High School (Broadway & Fayette St.), Cambridge Latin School (Lee St.), and Cambridge School for Girls established.
- 1887 - Cambridgeport Cycle Club organized.

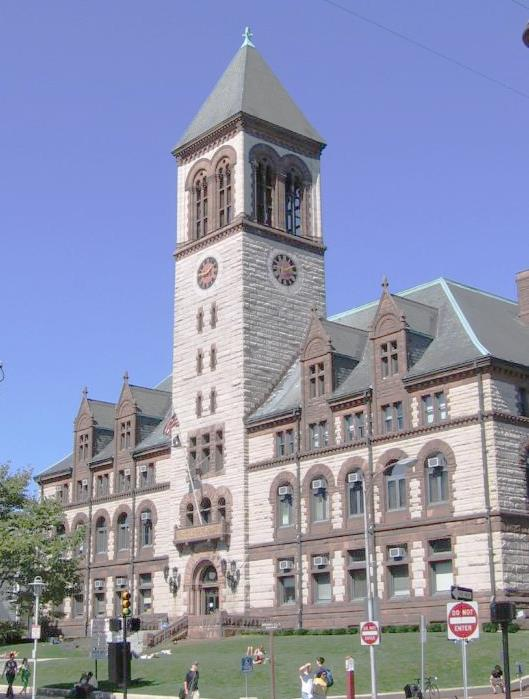
Cambridge, Massachusetts City Hall, located at 795 Massachusetts Avenue

- 1889
  - City Hall, Brattle Hall, and William James' house built.
  - Buckingham School founded.
  - Cambridge Plant Club established.
- 1890 - Population: 70,028.
- 1891 - Harvard Bridge built.
- 1892 - Old Cambridge Photographic Club formed.
- 1893 - Road built around Fresh Pond.
- 1894
  - Radcliffe College chartered.
  - Cambridge Walking Club founded.
- 1895
  - Lechmere Canal built.
  - Keezer's clothier in business.
  - W. E. B. Du Bois earns PhD from Harvard University.
- 1896 - Cambridge Political Equality Association established.
- 1897 - Cambridge Skating Club founded.
- 1900 - Population: 91,886.

== 20th century ==
=== 1900s–1940s ===
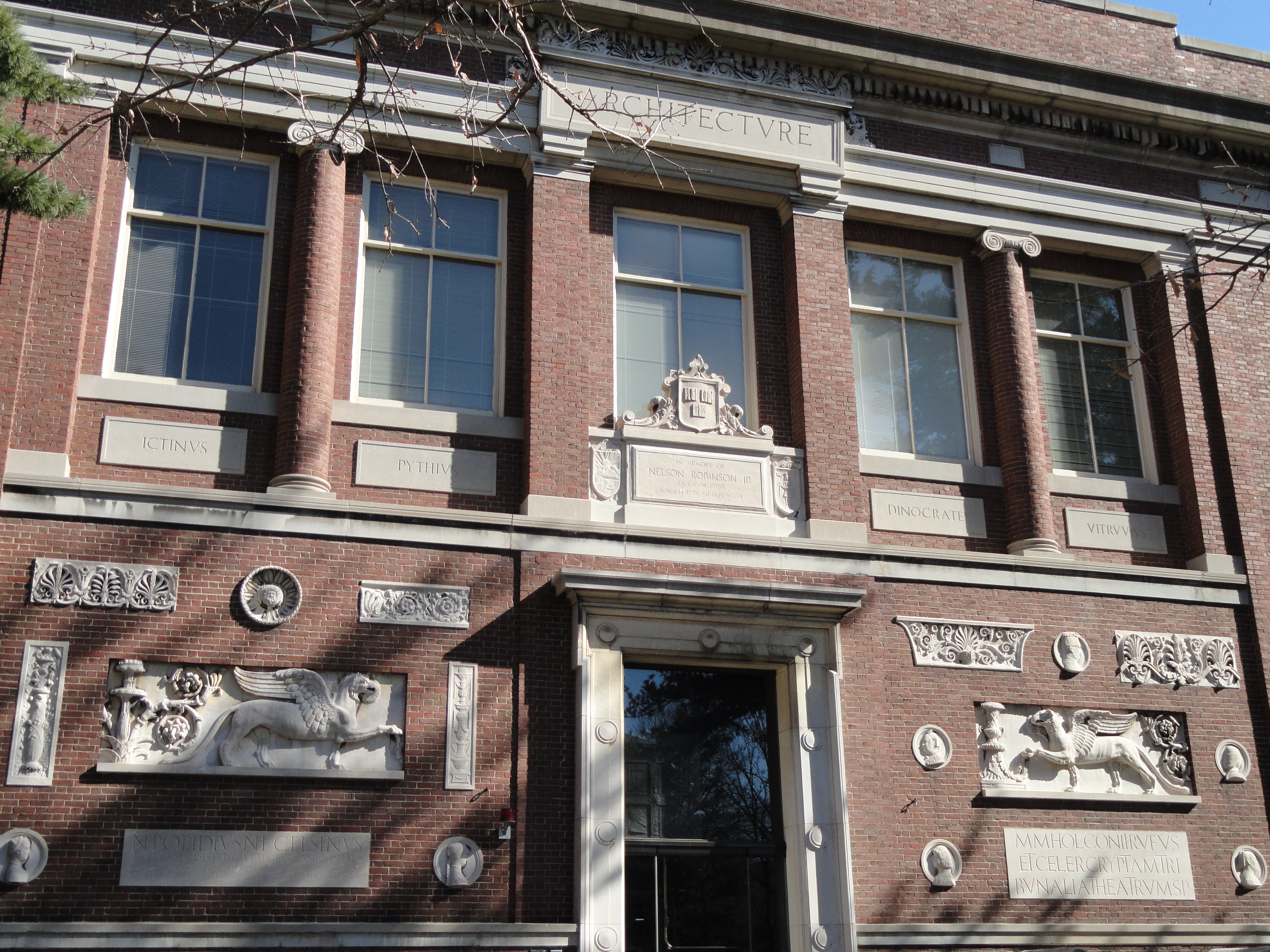
Robinson Hall (Harvard University) Originally constructed in 1904

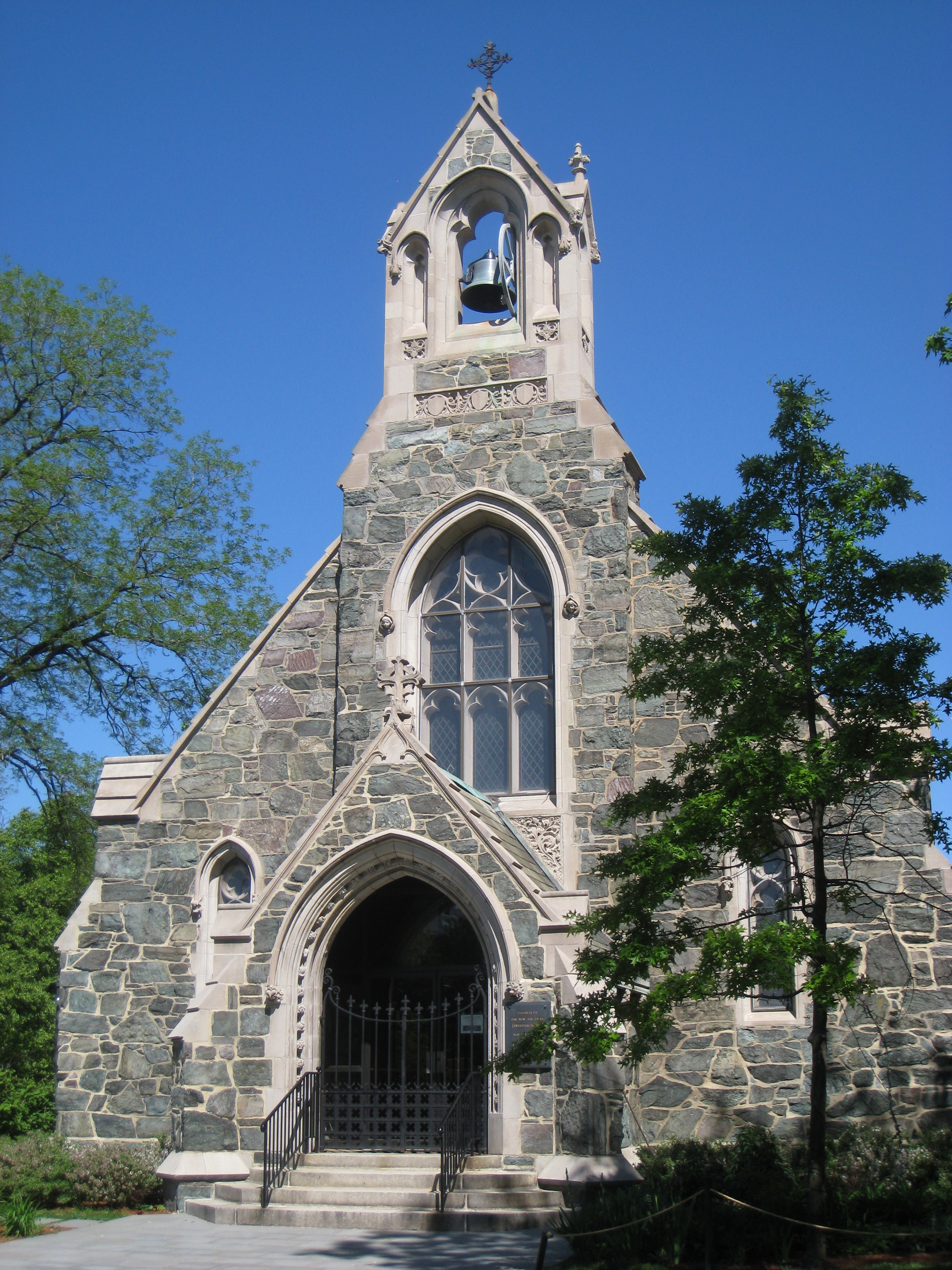
Swedenborg Chapel, Cambridge, MA- built in 1904

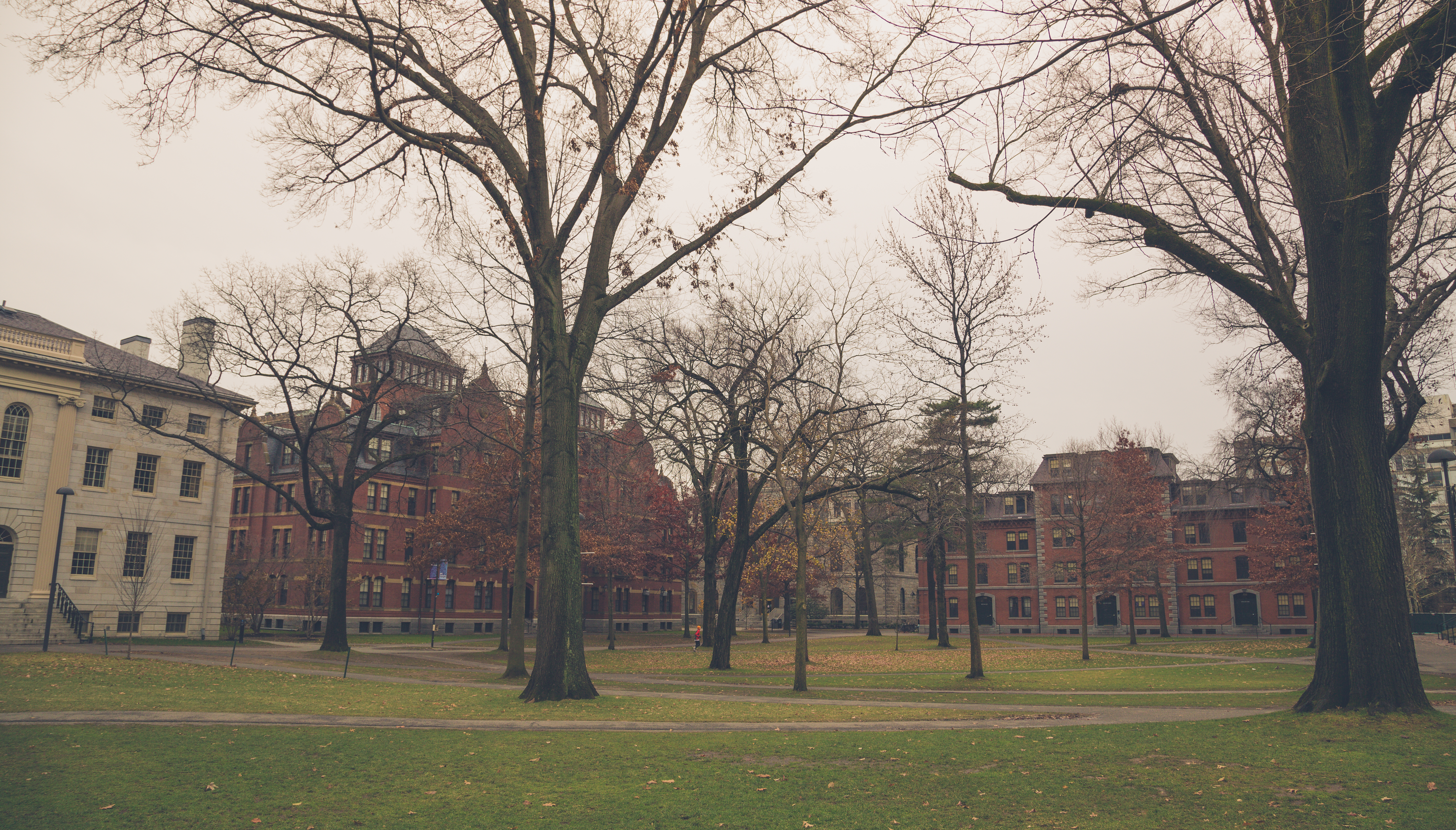
Harvard Yard

- 1901 - Swedenborg Chapel built.
- 1903
  - Cambridge Sentinel newspaper begins publication.
  - Busch–Reisinger Museum opens.
- 1904 - Harvard's Phillips Brooks House Association established.
- 1905 - Cambridge Historical Society founded.
- 1906 - Longfellow Bridge opens.
- 1908
  - Andover Theological Seminary relocates to city.
  - Harvard's Business School established.
- 1909 - Lesley School founded.
- 1910
  - Harvard Extension School founded.
  - Harvard Square Business Association founded.
  - Population: 104,839.
- 1911 - Cambridge Housing Association formed.
- 1912 - The Kendall/MIT, Central, and Harvard MBTA stations open.
- 1913
  - Harvard University Press and Harvard Legal Aid Bureau established.
  - Cohen harness maker in business.
- 1914 - Cambridge Planning Board established.
- 1915
  - Anderson Memorial Bridge and Harvard's Widener Library built.
  - Cooperative Open Air School founded.
- 1916
  - Massachusetts Institute of Technology moves to Cambridge
  - Tasty Sandwich Shop in business, a diner restaurant in Cambridge, open from 1916 to 1997 at 6 John F. Kennedy Street. Behind the counter is chef Don Valcovic,

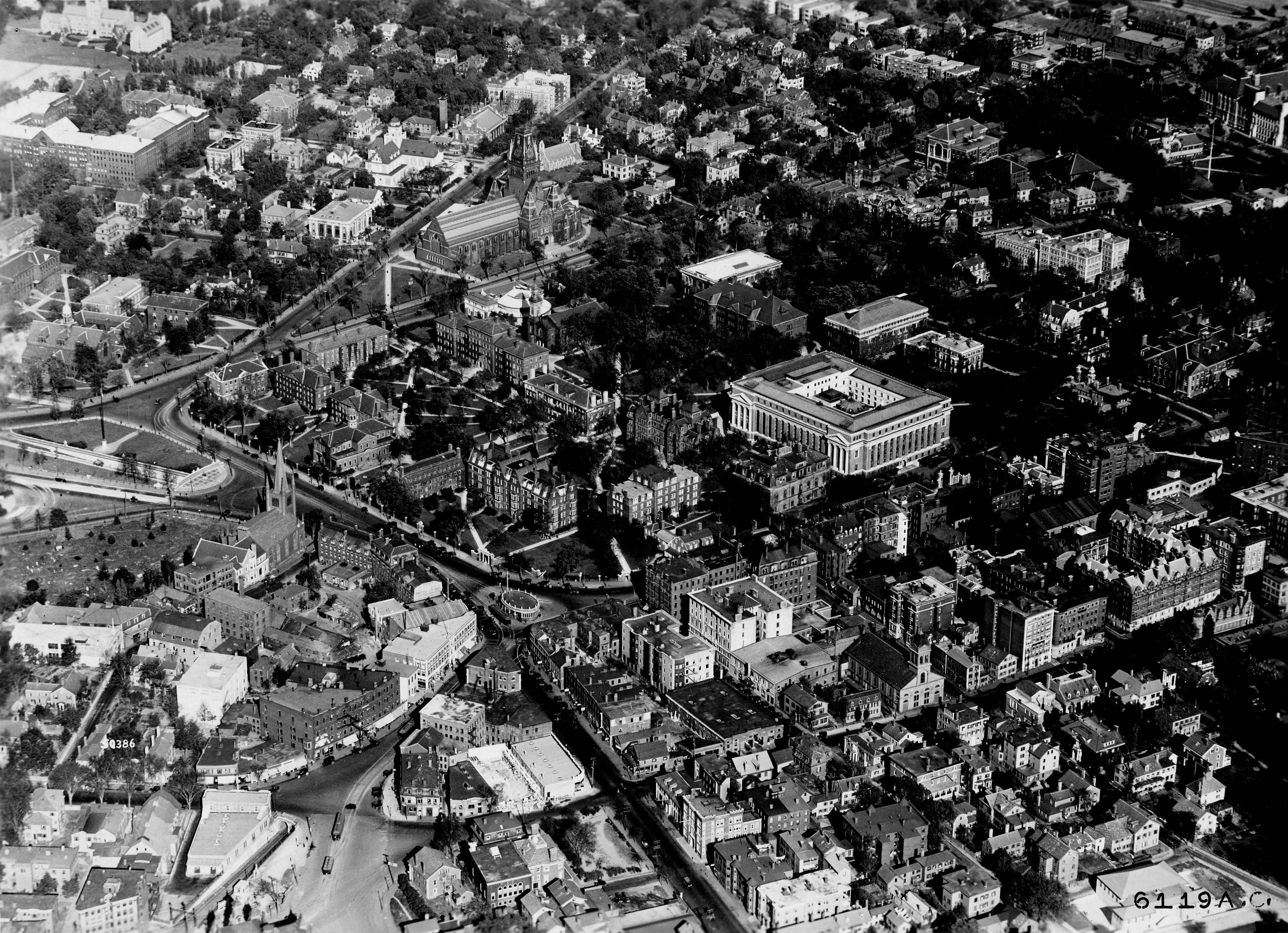
An aerial view of Harvard Square in 1921

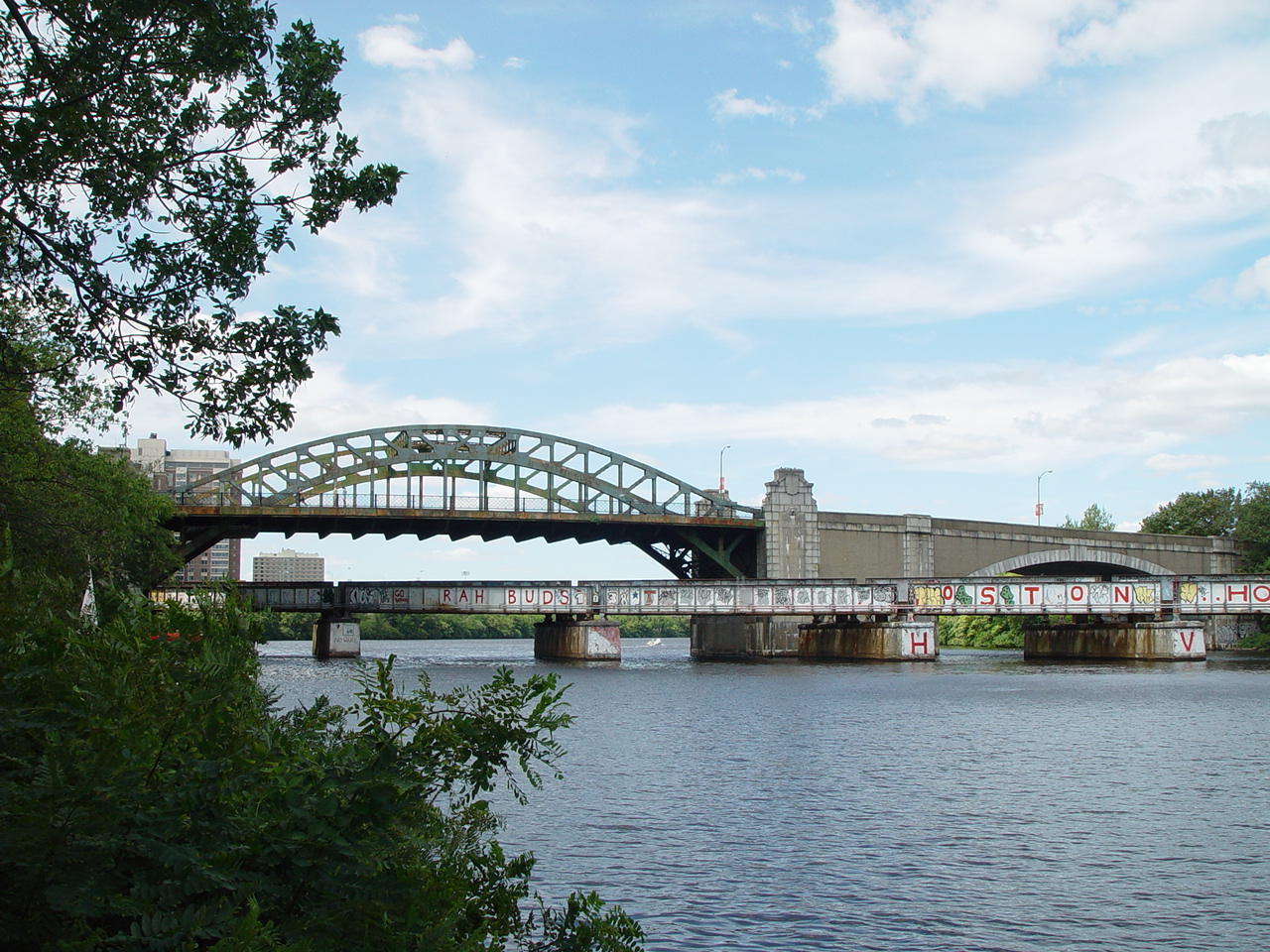
The Boston University Bridge, originally the Cottage Farm Bridge and commonly referred to as the BU Bridge

- 1917
  - Wursthaus restaurant in business.
  - Arthur D. Little Inc., Building constructed.
- 1923 - Washington Elm dies on Cambridge Common.
- 1924 - The Church of St. Paul (Harvard Square) built.
- 1926 - Harvard Square Theater opens.
- 1927
  - John W. Weeks Bridge built.
  - Necco factory opens on Massachusetts Avenue.
  - Grolier Poetry Bookshop and Mac-Gray Corp. in business.
- 1928 - Boston University Bridge built.
- 1929 - Cambridge Community Center founded.
- 1930
  - First Church of Christ, Scientist built.
  - Longy School of Music moves to Cambridge.
  - Russian bells installed in Harvard's Lowell House.
- 1932
  - Harvard Book Store and MIT's Technology Press and School of Architecture established.
  - Harvard's Memorial Church built.
- 1936 - Harvard's Graduate School of Public Administration and Graduate School of Design established.
- 1938
  - Hayes-Bickford Cafeteria in business (approximate date).
  - Harvard's Nieman Foundation for Journalism established.
- 1940
  - National Research Corporation in business.
  - Cambridge citizens vote to adopt proportional representation for elections of its city council and school committee, with first use in 1941.

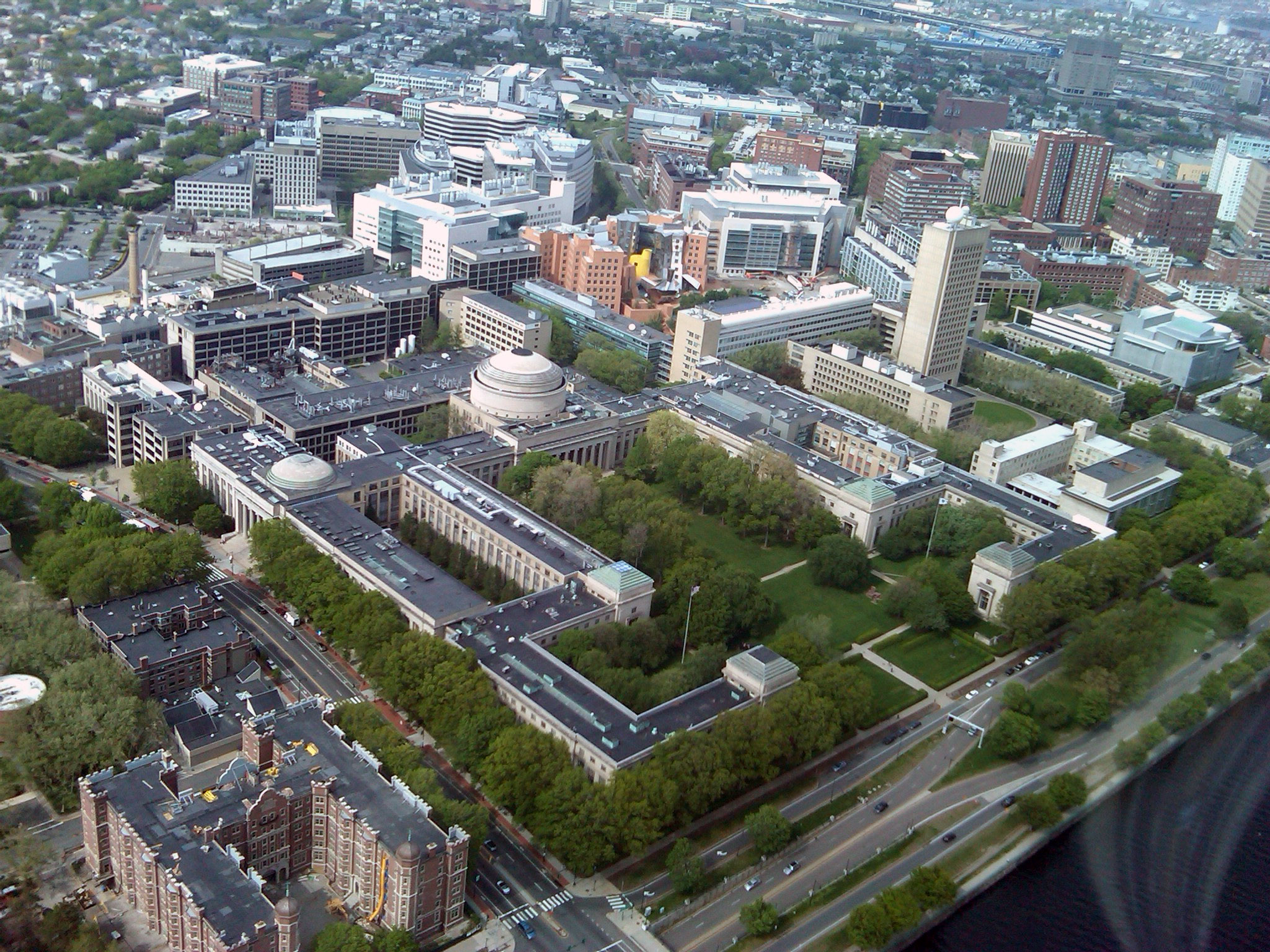
MIT Main Campus Aerial

- 1941
  - Magazine of Cambridge begins publication.
  - Harvard's Houghton Library built.
- 1942 - John B. Atkinson becomes city manager.
- 1945 - Cambridge Civic Unity Committee established.
- 1945 - Irving House established.
- 1946 - WMIT begins broadcasting.
- 1947
  - September 9: Computer bug found at the Harvard Computation Lab.
  - Demise of the Harvard Botanic Garden.
  - Edgerton, Germeshausen, and Grier in business.

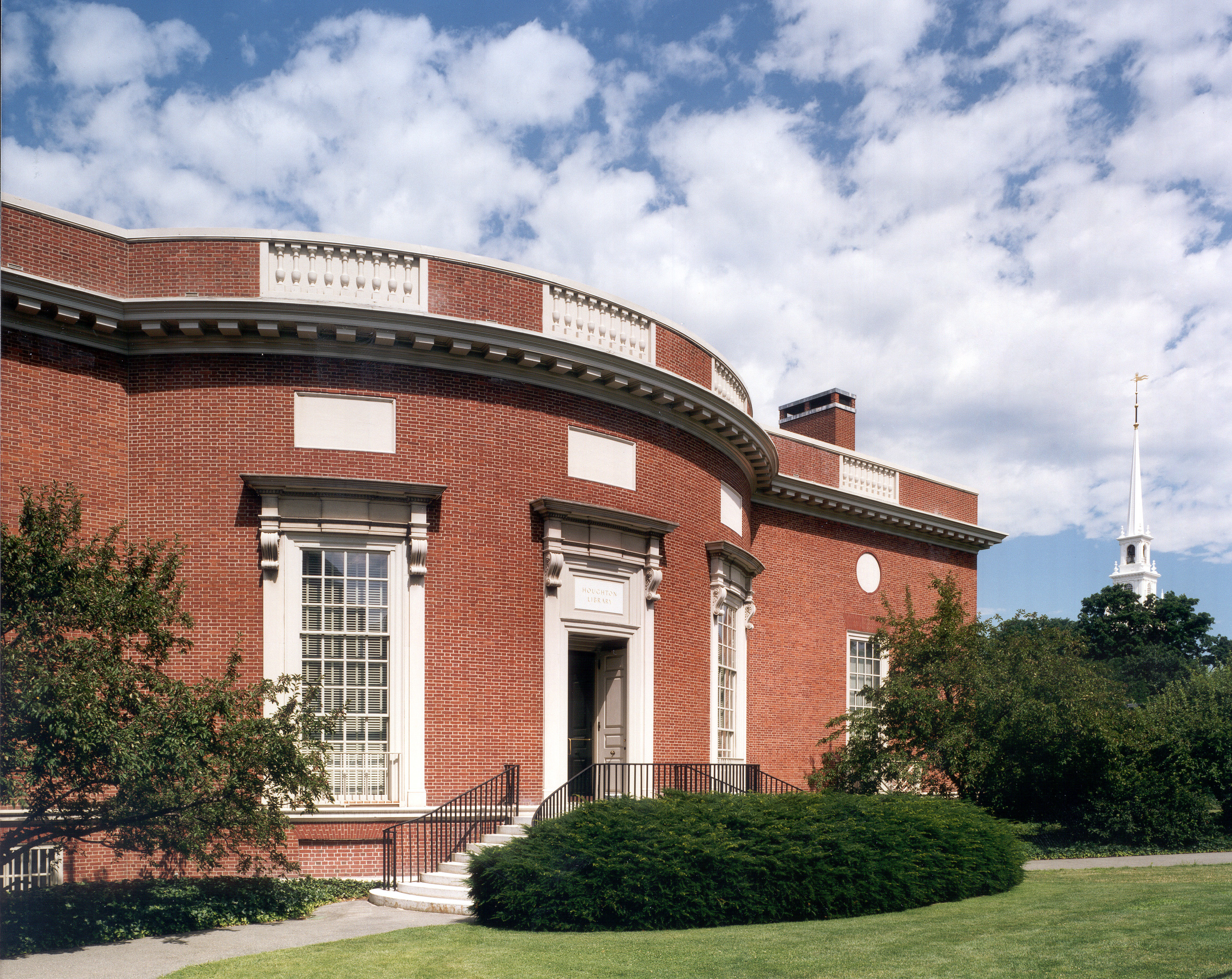
Houghton Library exterior

=== 1950s–1970s ===
- 1950
  - Cardullo's Gourmet Shop in business.
  - Joseph DeGuglielmo becomes mayor.
- 1951
  - Fresh Pond Drive-In opens.
  - WHRB incorporated.
- 1952
  - John J. Curry becomes city manager.
  - MIT School of Industrial Management and MIT Center for International Studies established.
- 1953
  - Brattle Theatre begins screening movies.
  - Harvard Model United Nations conference begins.
- 1954 - Wang Laboratories, Cheapo Records, and Hong Kong restaurant in business.

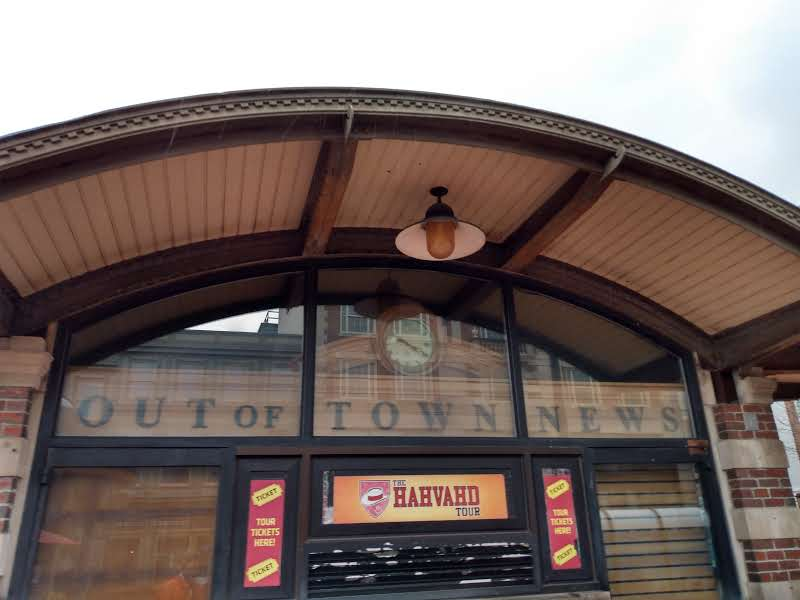
Out of Town News, Harvard Square, Cambridge, Massachusetts

- 1955
  - Out of Town News, Casablanca bar, Elsie's eatery and Ferranti-Dege camera store in business.
  - Smithsonian Astrophysical Observatory relocated to Cambridge.
- 1957
  - Cambridge Buddhist Association established.
  - Pangloss Bookstore in business.
- 1958
  - Club 47 (music venue) opens.
  - Joyce Chen restaurant and Chez Jean restaurant in business.
  - Lisp (programming language) invented at MIT.
  - Smoot measurement established.
- 1959
  - Café Pamplona in business.
  - Harvard/MIT Center for Urban Studies and MIT Artificial Intelligence Laboratory established.
- 1960
  - Bartley's restaurant in business.
  - Harvard's Let's Go travel guides begin publication.
  - Out of Town News opens in Harvard Square and goes to last sixty years selling newspapers from all over the world.
- 1961

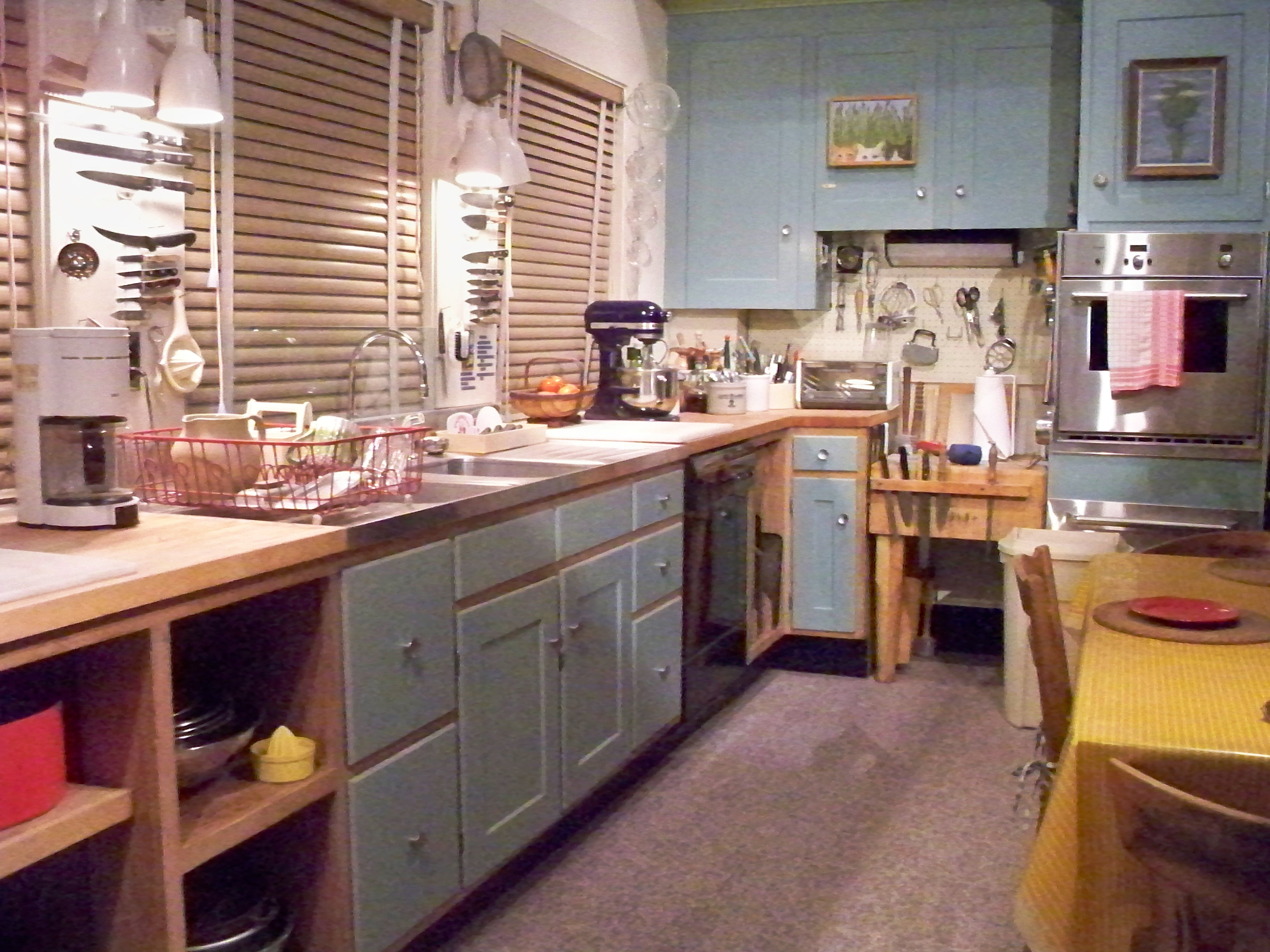
Julia Child's kitchen Smithsonian National Museum of American History.

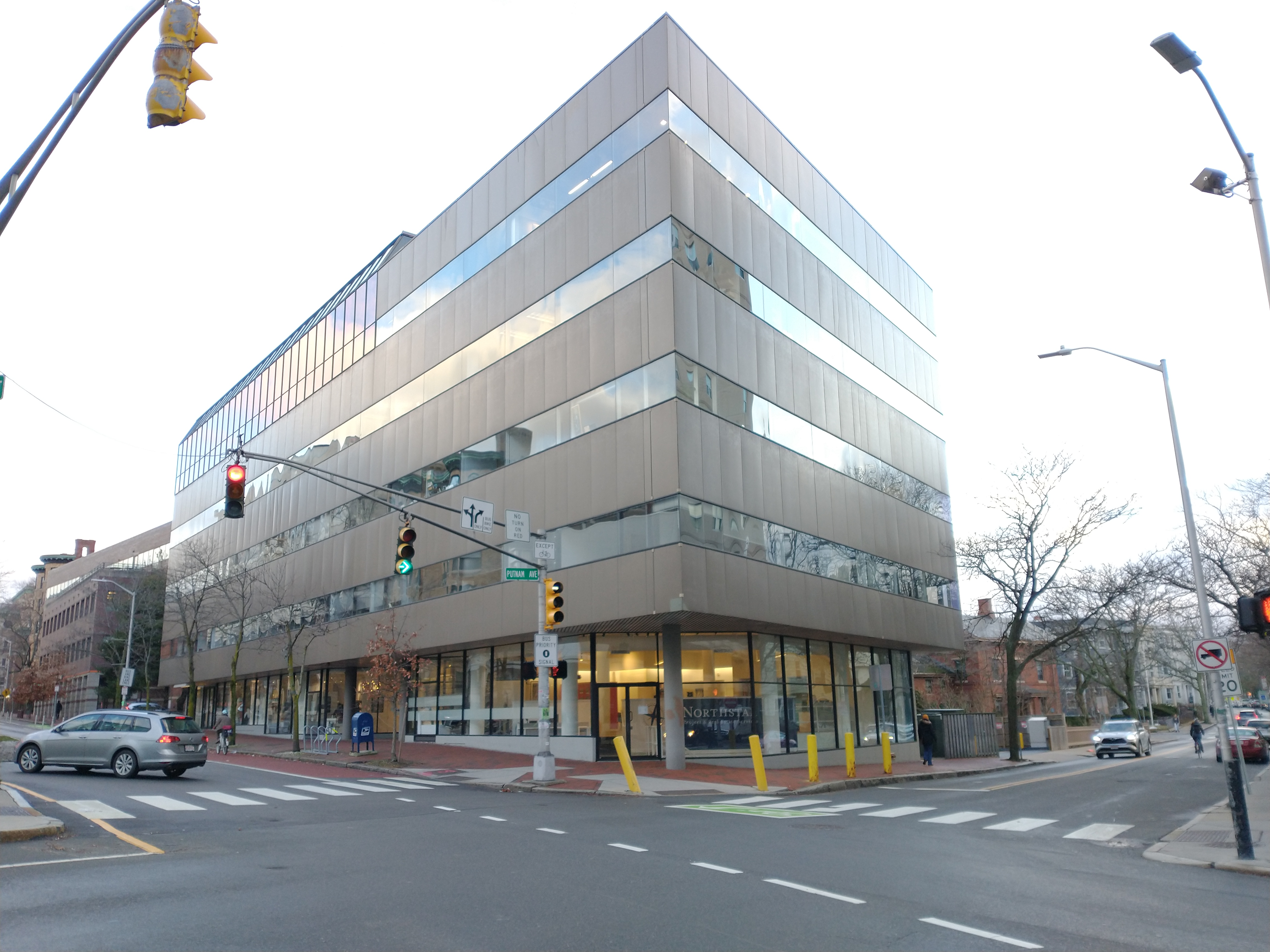
Built in 1970s style, National Bureau of Economic Research. Cambridge, Massachusetts - Harvard Square, USA

  - Julia Child moves to Cambridge.
  - October 14: Fire destroys the original WGBH television and radio studios, at MIT.
- 1962
  - Temple Beth Shalom founded.
  - Fresh Pond Shopping Center built.
  - Cambridge Electron Accelerator in operation.
  - Harvard's Carpenter Center for the Visual Arts built.
  - Cambridge Seven Associates in business.
  - Cambridge Sports Union founded.
- 1963 - Cambridge Historical Commission established.
- 1964 - NASA Electronics Research Center established.
- 1965 - Head of the Charles Regatta established.

- 1966 - Cambridge School Volunteers founded.
- 1967
  - Joseph DeGuglielmo becomes city manager.
  - Cambridge Forum, MIT's Center for Advanced Visual Studies established.
- 1968
  - Cambridge Housing Convention active.
  - Shrdlu computer program developed at MIT.
- 1969
  - Murder of Jane Britton
  - Student antiwar protest.
  - Union of Concerned Scientists, and Harvard's Institute for African and African-American Research founded.
  - Passim and Plough and Stars in business.
- 1970
  - The Middle East restaurant opens.
  - Rent control and Massachusetts Department of Transportation Volpe Center established.
  - Alfred Vellucci becomes mayor.
- 1971
  - Cambridge and Somerville Legal Services established.
  - Grendel's Den pub in business.
  - Revels performance series begins.
- 1972
  - Broadway Bicycle School in business.
  - Longfellow National Historic Site and Cambridge Women's Center established.
  - Harvard's Gund Hall built.
  - October: Protest in East Cambridge against police conduct.
- 1973
  - Harvard–Smithsonian Center for Astrophysics established.
  - Draper Laboratory active.
  - T.T. the Bear's Place and Hacker's Haven car repair shop in business.
- 1974
  - Cambridge Food Co-op, city Arts Council, city Community Development Department, and Buckingham Browne & Nichols school established.
  - James Sullivan becomes city manager.
  - Cambridge Naturals in business.
- 1975 - Coffee Connection in business.
- 1977
  - Cambridge Rindge and Latin School formed.

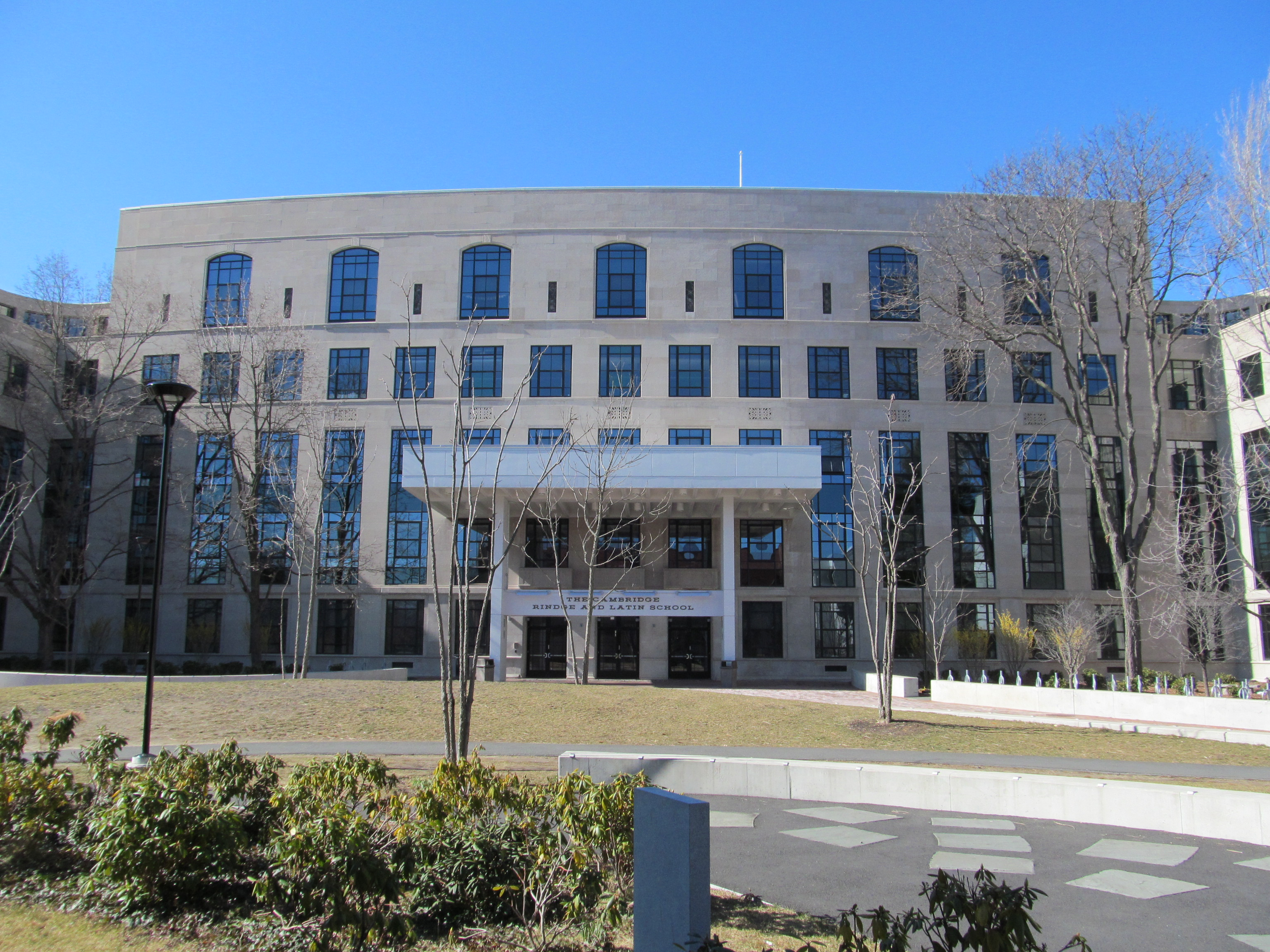
Cambridge Rindge and Latin School (building.Cambridge, MA)Cambridge Rindge and Latin School

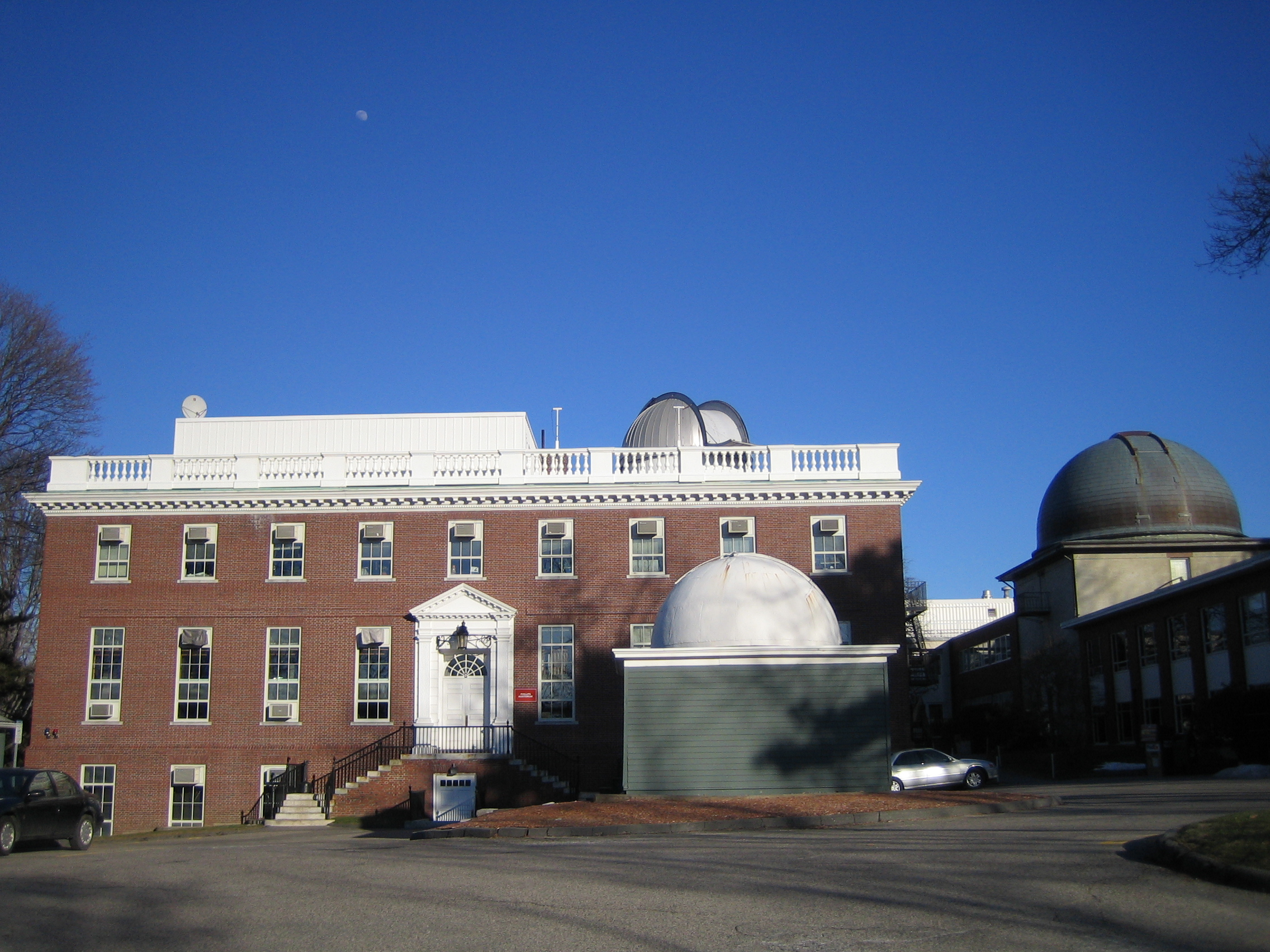
Smithsonian Astrophysical Observatory (SAO) is a research institute of the Smithsonian Institution Harvard, concentrating on astrophysical studies including galactic and extragalactic astronomy, cosmology, solar, earth and planetary sciences, theory

  - River Festival begins.
  - Changsho restaurant in business.
- 1978
  - National Bureau of Economic Research active.
  - Formaggio Kitchen in business.
- 1979 - Harvard's Film Archive opens.

=== 1980s–1990s ===
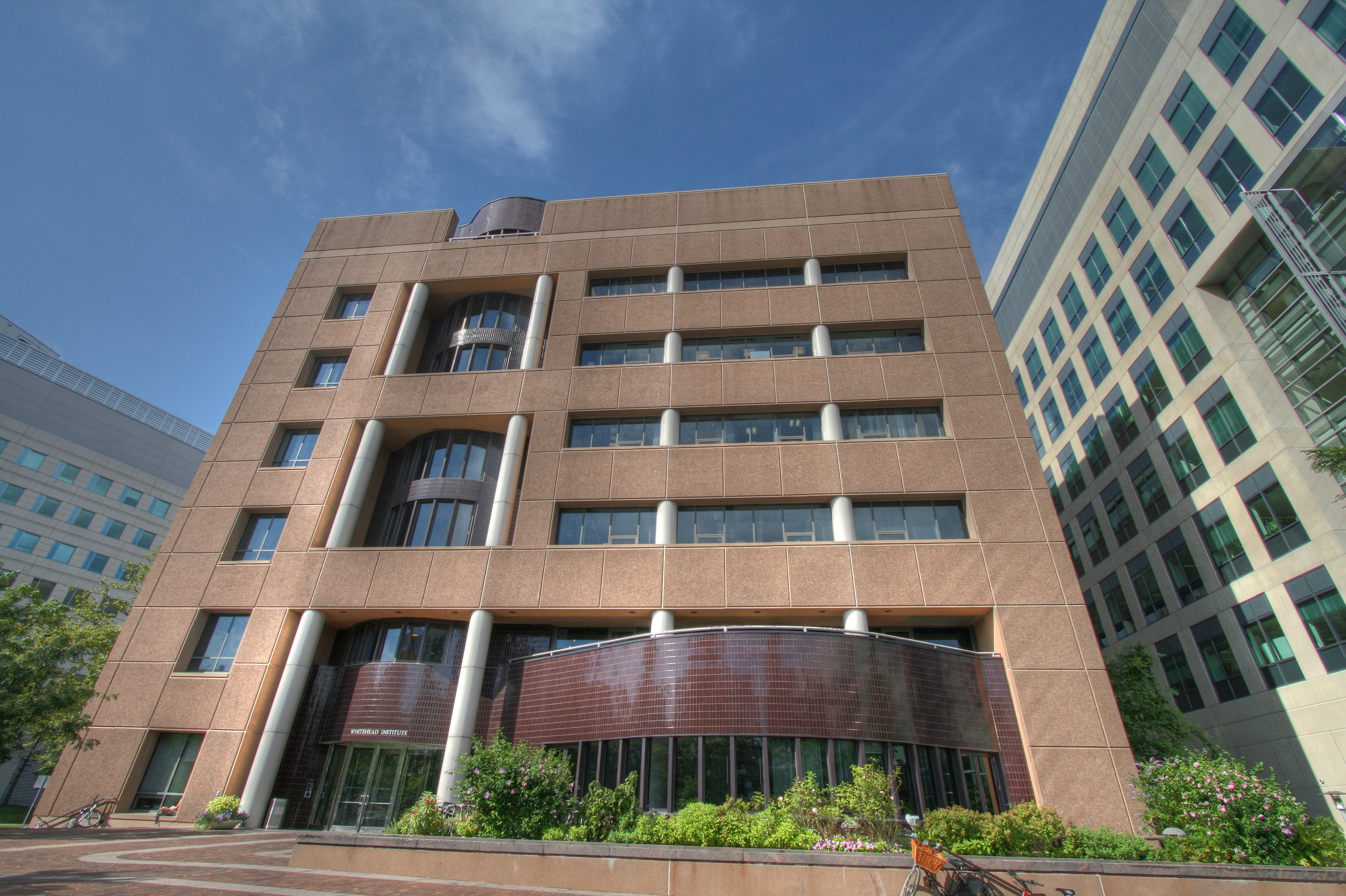
Whitehead Institute for Biomedical Research Cambridge, Massachusetts

- 1980
  - American Repertory Theater and MIT's PiKa housing cooperative established.
  - MIT Museum active.
- 1981
  - American Academy of Arts and Sciences moves to Cambridge.
  - Cambridge College active.
  - Robert W. Healy becomes city manager.
  - Cambridge Center complex construction begins.
- 1982
  - Whitehead Institute for Biomedical Research founded.
  - Biogen, Toscanini's, and Upstairs at the Pudding restaurant in business.
  - Sister city relationships established with Coimbra, Portugal, and Gaeta, Italy.
- 1983
  - Harvard Square Homeless Shelter and Albert Einstein Institution established.
  - Monitor Group and Cambridge Energy Research Associates headquartered in Cambridge.
  - Sister city relationships established with Tsukuba Science City, Ibaraki, Japan; and Dublin, Ireland.
  - Pegasystems Inc. and Forrester Research in business.
  - Premiere of Marsha Norman's play Night, Mother.
- 1984
  - MIT Media Lab, Institute for Resource and Security Studies, and city Police Review & Advisory Board established.
  - Sister city relationship established with Ischia, Italy.
  - Porter MBTA Red Line station opens.
  - Conflict Management Group headquartered in city.
  - Thinking Machines Corporation and Charles Hotel in business.

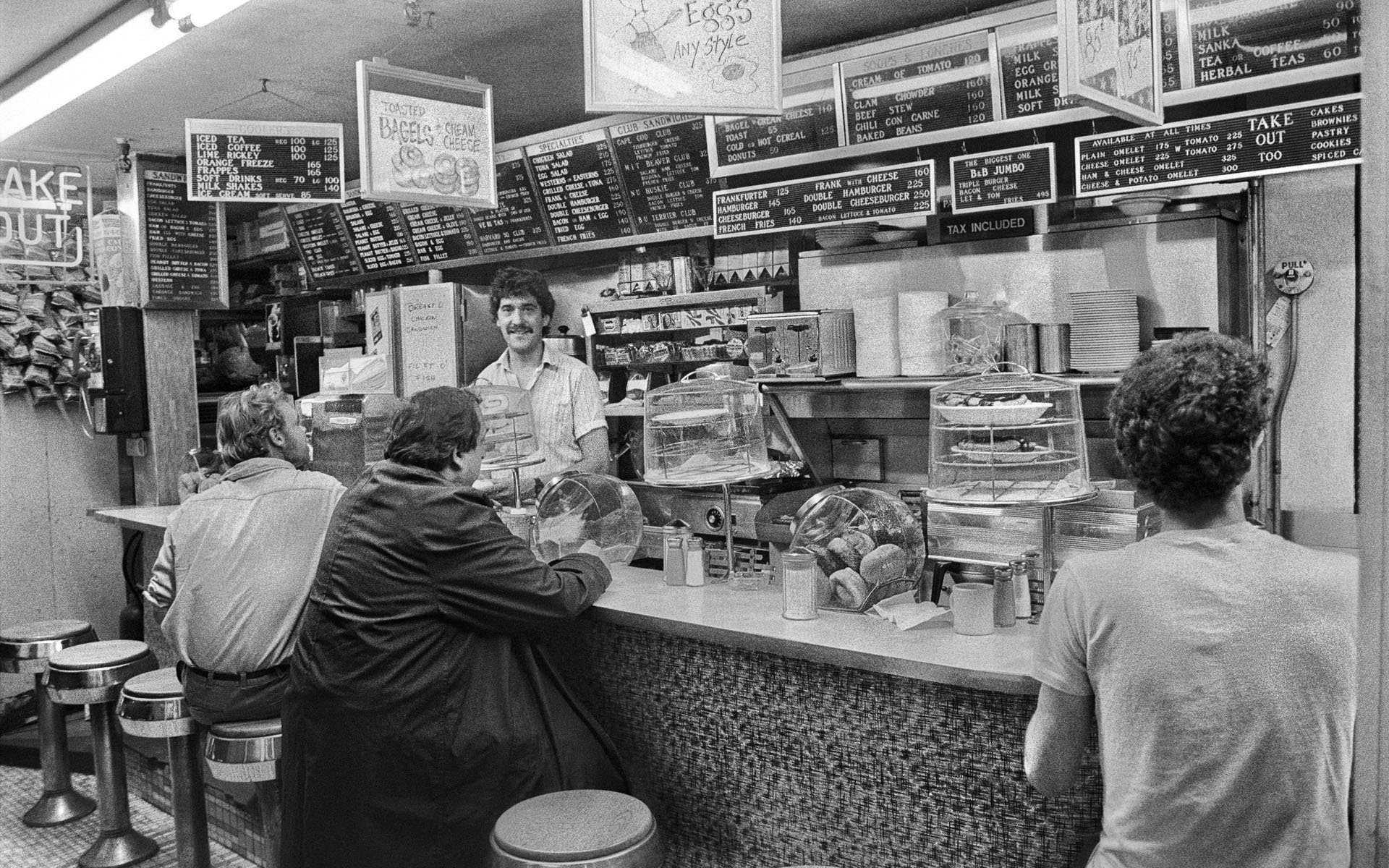
The Tasty sandwich shop in Harvard Square, 1985.

- 1985
  - Alewife (MBTA station) opens.
  - Harvard's Arthur M. Sackler Museum built.
  - Dante Alighieri Society building inaugurated.
  - Memorial Drive partially pedestrianized along Riverbend Park.
- 1986
  - Garment District (clothing retailer) in business.
  - Thinking Machines' Connection Machine invented.
  - MIT flea market begins.
- 1987
  - Sister city relationships established with Yerevan, Armenia; San José Las Flores, Chalatenango, El Salvador; and Catania, Italy.
  - Cambridge becomes a Peace Messenger City.
  - Catch a Rising Star in business.
  - Joseph P. Kennedy II becomes U.S. representative for Massachusetts's 8th congressional district.
- 1988 - Cambridge Community Television and Cambridge Eviction Free Zone established.
- 1989
  - Cambridge Sane/Freeze active.
  - Sister city relationship established with Kraków, Poland.
- 1990
  - CambridgeSide Galleria built.

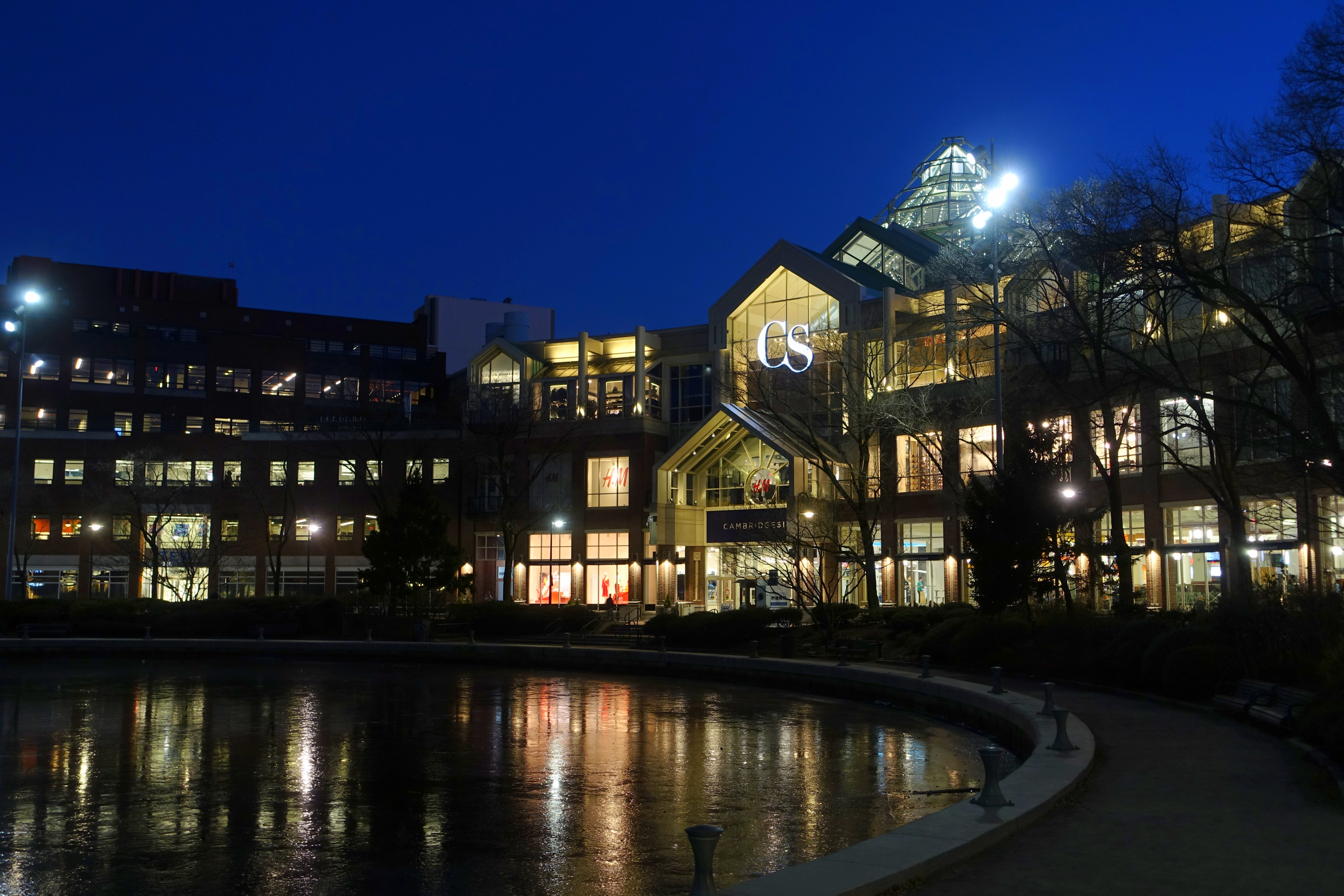
Cambridgeside Galleria, built in 1990.

  - Sapient Corporation in business.
- 1991
  - City Bicycle Committee and Ig Nobel Prize established.
  - MÄK Technologies in business.
- 1992
  - Boston Dynamics (robotics firm) and Dewey, Cheetham & Howe in business.
  - Kenneth Reeves becomes mayor.
  - Sister city relationship established with Florence, Italy.

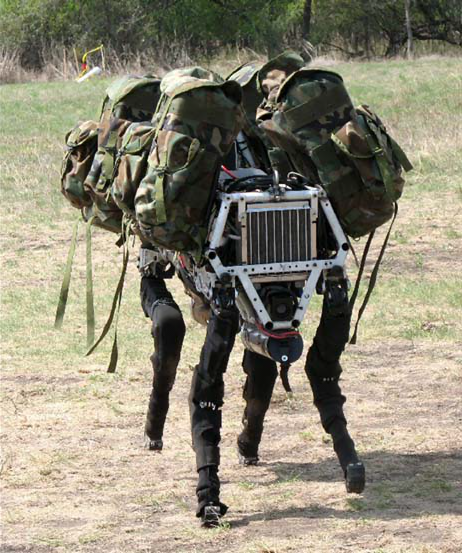
Boston Dynamics BigDog

- 1993
  - City master plan published.
  - MIT's The Tech newspaper web edition begins publication.
  - Timothy J. Toomey, Jr. becomes state representative for 29th Middlesex district.
- 1994
  - Islamic Society of Boston mosque opens.
  - Rialto restaurant in business.
- 1995
  - Kendall Square Cinema opens.
  - Porter Square Neighbors Association formed.
  - Cybersmith and Phoenix Landing (music venue) in business.
- 1996
  - Cambridge Health Alliance and On The Rise nonprofit established.
  - City Dance Party begins.
  - Sheila Russell becomes mayor.
- 1997
  - City website online.
  - Cambridge Civic Journal begins publication.
  - Sister city relationship established with Galway, Ireland.
  - French-American International School active.

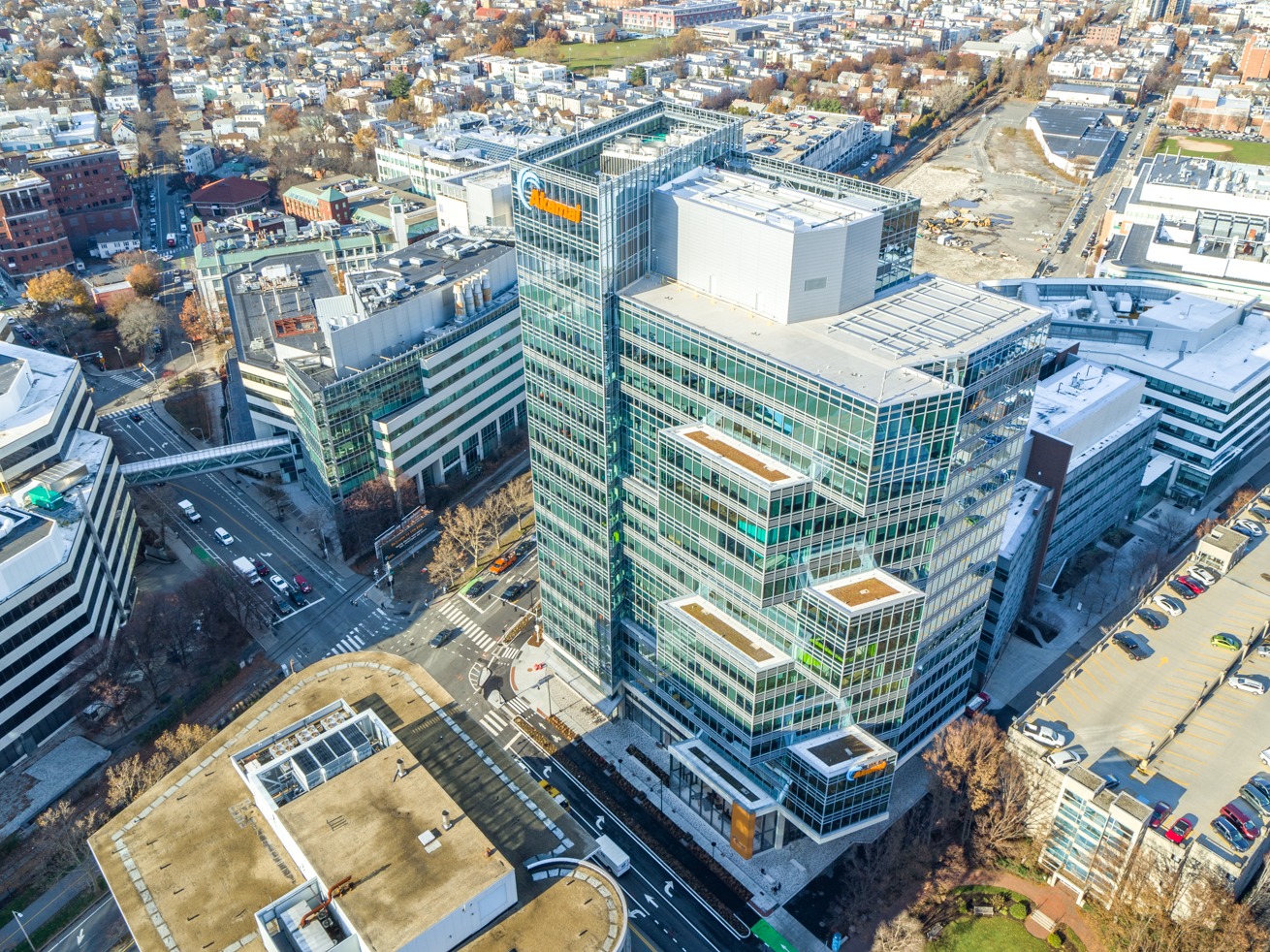
Akamai's headquarters in Cambridge, Massachusetts

- 1998
  - Akamai Technologies in business.
  - MIT's Center for Reflective Community Practice active.
  - Francis Duehay becomes mayor.
  - Harvard's Berkman Center for Internet & Society founded.
- 1999
  - Cambridge Innovation Center in business.
  - Mike Capuano becomes U.S. representative for Massachusetts's 8th congressional district.

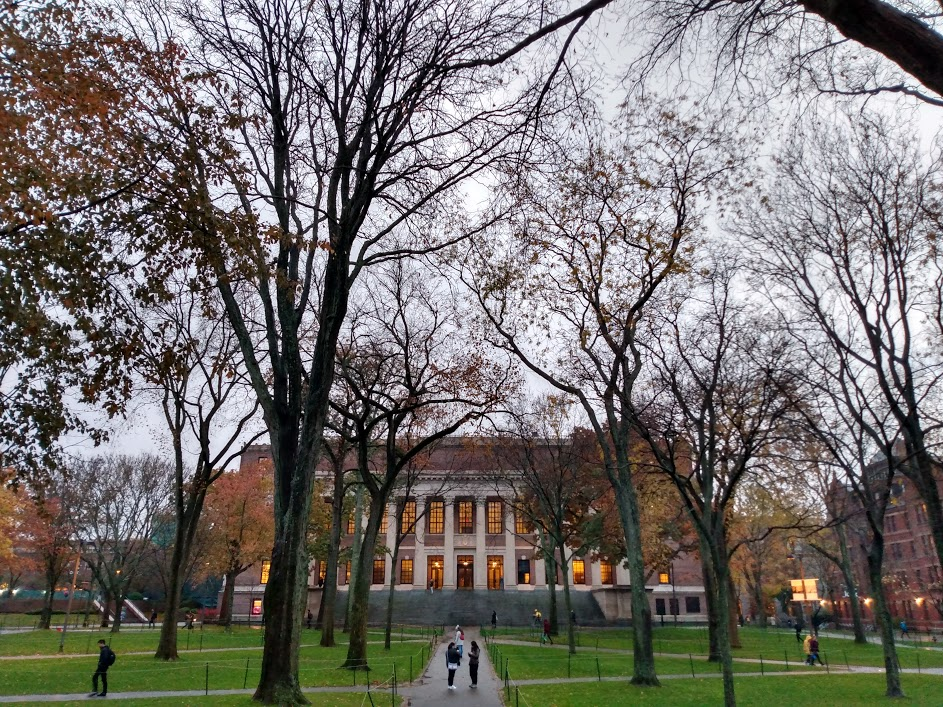
Part of the world-famousHarvard Yard

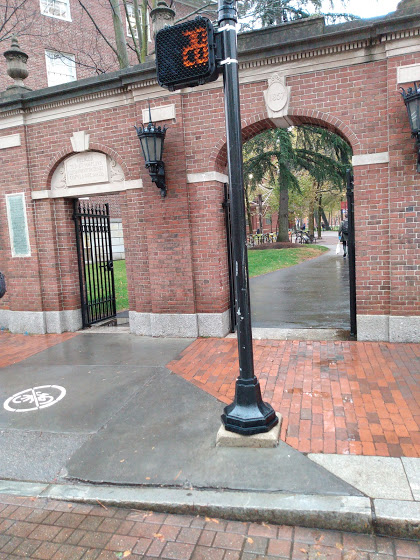
One of many entrances to Harvard Yard, November 2019

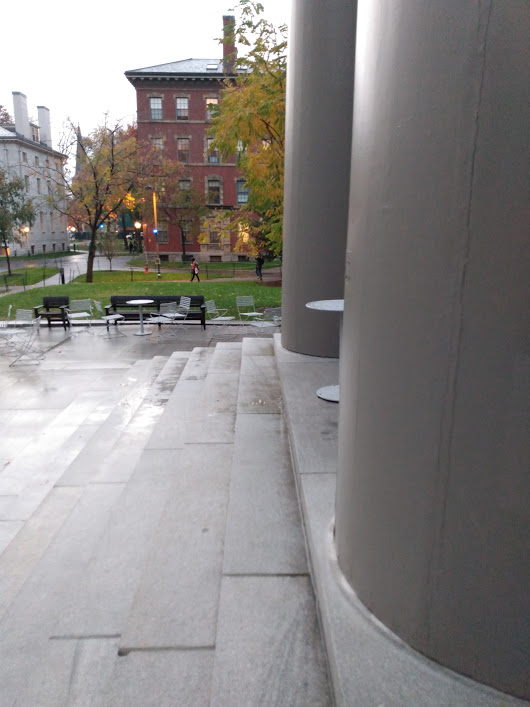
Harvard University,. November, 2019

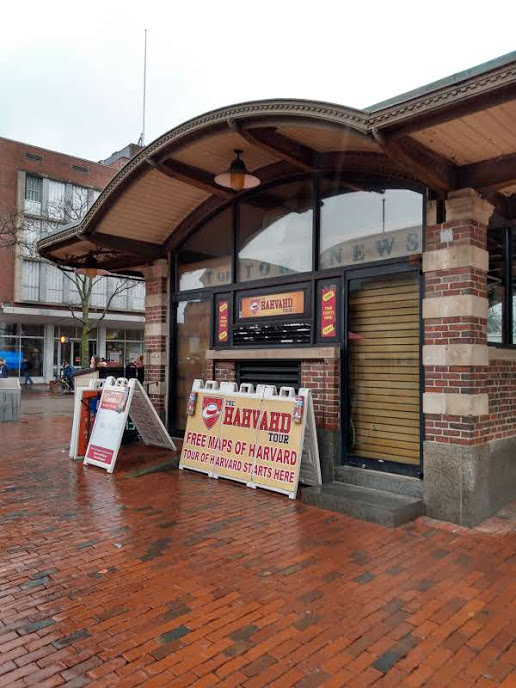
The Out of Town News, Harvard Square, Cambridge, Massachusetts in 2019.

== 21st century ==
- 2000
  - Zipcar in business.
  - Anthony Galluccio becomes mayor.
  - MIT's Kismet (robot) introduced.
- 2001
  - New water treatment plant at Fresh Pond opens.
- 2002 - Michael A. Sullivan becomes mayor.
- 2003
  - Novartis research division headquartered in city.
  - Longwood Players (theatre group) active.
  - MIT's Poverty Action Lab and Harvard's Ash Institute for Democratic Governance and Innovation founded.
  - Sister city relationship established with Santo Domingo Oeste, Dominican Republic.

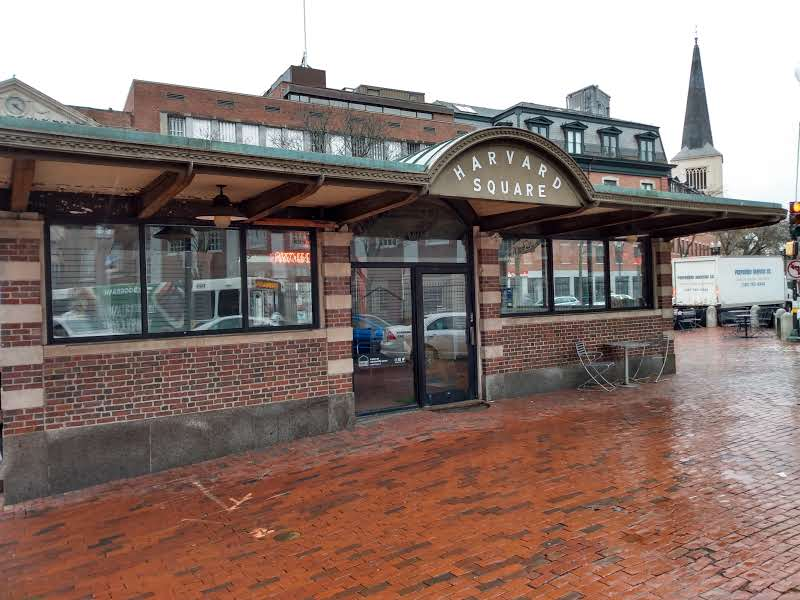
Out of Town News Harvard Square, Cambridge, Massachusetts

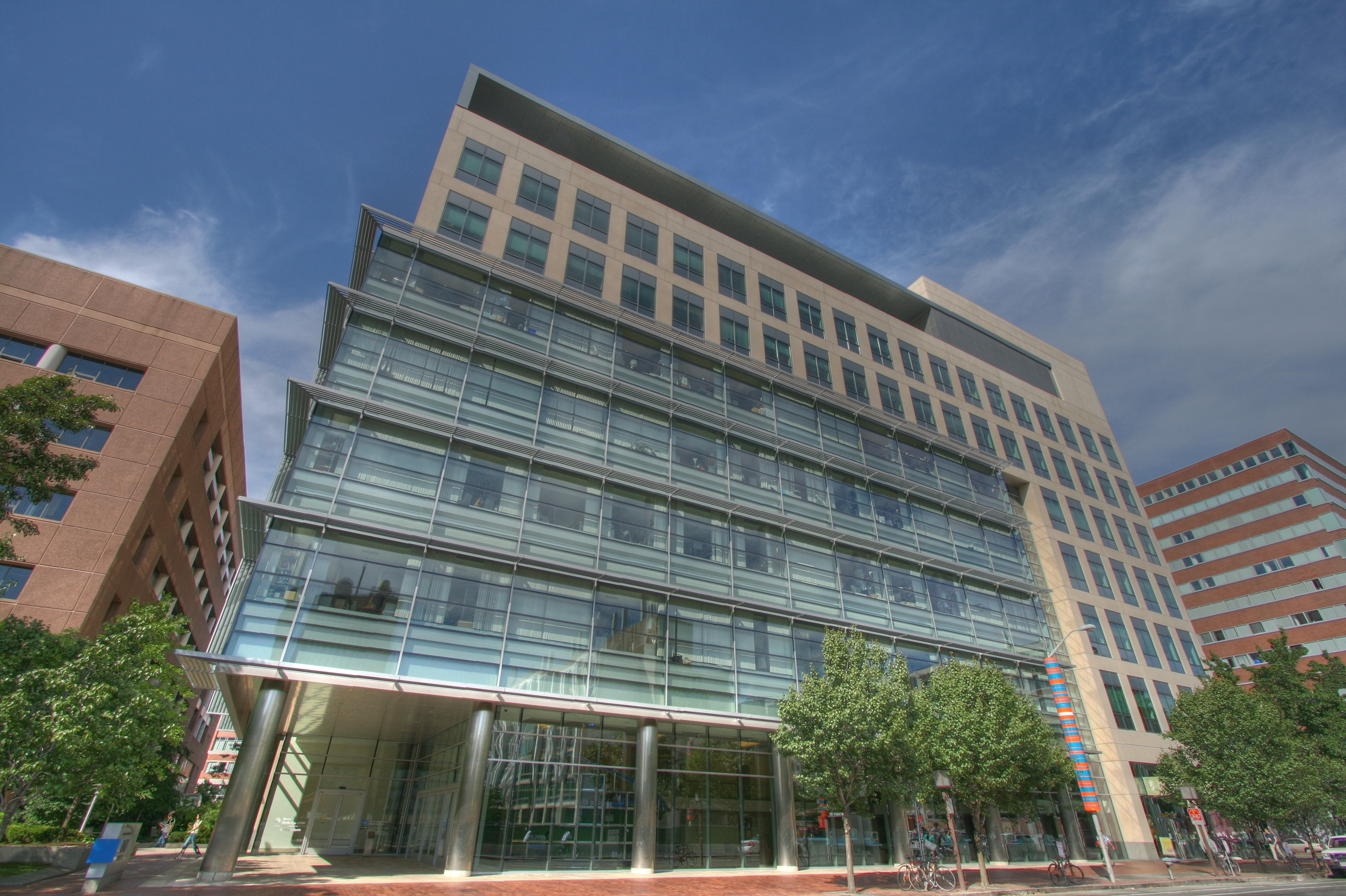
Broad Institute, Community Charter School of Cambridge opens in 2004

- 2004
  - Broad Institute, Community Charter School of Cambridge, and ActBlue (nonprofit) established.
  - MIT's Stata Center built.
  - Sister city relationship established with Southwark, London, England.
  - February 4: Facebook launched at Harvard College.
- 2005
  - Sister city relationships established with Cienfuegos, Cuba; Yuseong, Daejeon, Korea; and Haidian, Beijing, China.
  - Cambridge Day begins publication.
  - Patricia D. Jehlen becomes state senator for 2nd Middlesex district.
- 2006
  - Green Decade Cambridge incorporated.
  - Kenneth Reeves becomes mayor again.
  - Harvard's Rappaport Institute for Greater Boston established.
  - HubSpot in business.

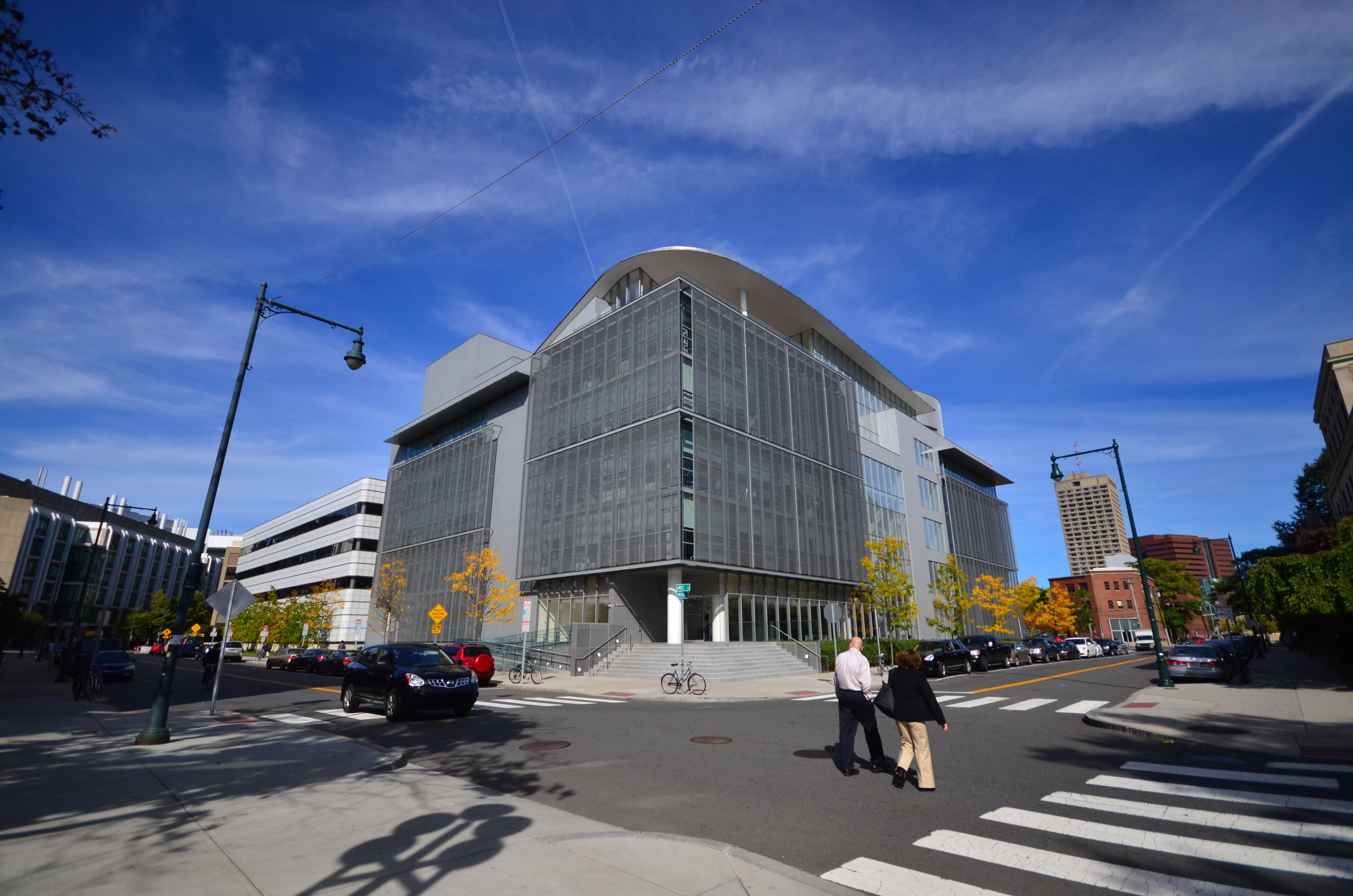
The new Media Lab expansion (Building E14). The original Wiesner Building (E15) is visible at left.

- 2007
  - Microsoft New England Research & Development Center opens.
  - Cambridge Science Festival begins.
  - MIT's Center for Future Civic Media established.
  - Unitarian Universalist Service Committee headquartered in Cambridge.
  - Anthony Petruccelli becomes state senator for 1st Suffolk and Middlesex district.
- 2008
  - Alliance of Cambridge Tenants, and Google Inc. branch established.
  - ImprovBoston moves to Cambridge.
  - Harvard Square Library incorporated.
  - E. Denise Simmons becomes mayor.
  - ROFLCon meme convention begins.
  - Central Square Theater built.
  - Jon Hecht elected state representative for 29th Middlesex district.
- 2009
  - July: Henry Louis Gates arrest controversy
  - West Cambridge Youth and Community Center opens.
  - Kendall Square Association established.
  - Cambridge Open Studios active.
  - Trader Joe's grocery in business at Fresh Pond.
- 2010
  - David Maher becomes mayor.
  - Population: 105,162; metro 4,552,402.
  - Sal DiDomenico becomes state senator for Middlesex, Suffolk and Essex district.
- 2011
  - January 6: Aaron Swartz arrested.
  - Area Four restaurant, Veggie Galaxy restaurant and Danger!awesome in business.
- 2012
  - MIT/Harvard edX launched.
  - Henrietta Davis becomes mayor.
  - Hack/reduce nonprofit founded.
  - Sinclair and Amazon office in business.
- 2013
  - Richard Rossi becomes city manager.
  - Cambridge Open Data Ordinance drafted.
  - Cambridge Happenings in publication.
  - April 18–19: MIT officer killed; manhunt for Boston Marathon bombing suspects takes place.
  - November: Municipal election.
  - December: Katherine Clark becomes U.S. representative for Massachusetts's 5th congressional district.
  - Marjorie Decker becomes state representative for 25th Middlesex district, Dave Rogers becomes state representative for 24th Middlesex district, and Jay Livingstone becomes state representative for 8th Suffolk district.
- 2014
  - City open data portal launched.
  - H Mart grocery and Alden & Harlow restaurant in business.
  - David Maher becomes mayor again.
- 2015
  - January 2015 North American blizzard.
  - September 6: Lawrence Lessig presidential campaign, 2016 headquartered in city.
  - December 3: Fire.

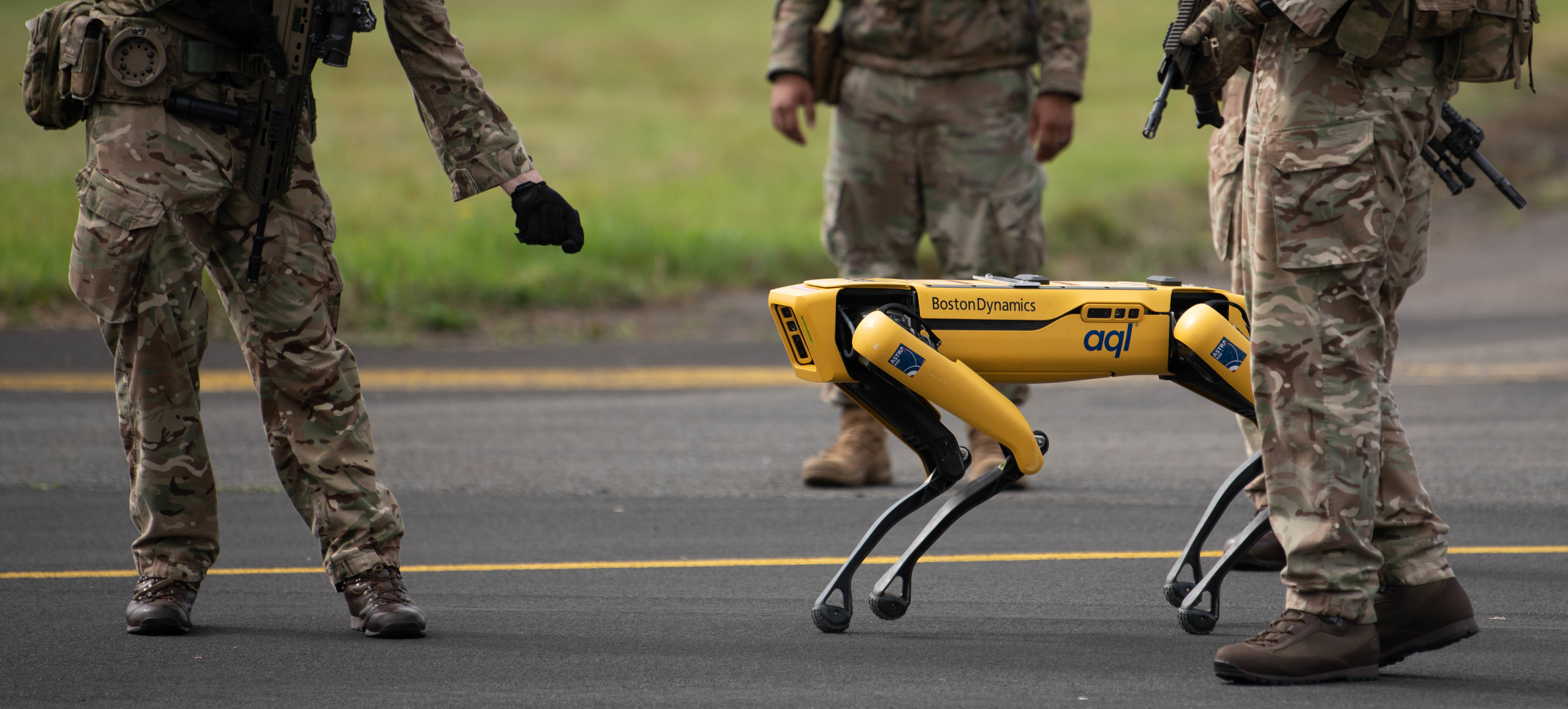
Spot being tested alongside British Royal Air Force service members

== See also ==
- Cambridge, Massachusetts history section
- List of mayors of Cambridge, Massachusetts
- National Register of Historic Places listings in Cambridge, Massachusetts
- List of National Historic Landmarks in Massachusetts, Cambridge section
- History of the Massachusetts Institute of Technology
- History of Harvard University
- Timelines of other municipalities in Middlesex County, Massachusetts: Lowell, Somerville, Waltham

== Bibliography ==
=== Published in the 19th century ===
1800s-1840s

- Abiel Holmes (1801), History of Cambridge, Boston: Samuel Hall, OL 22882322M
- "Cambridge". Edinburgh Gazetteer. Edinburgh: A. Constable and co.; etc., etc. 1822. hdl:2027/nyp.33433000458731.
- Jedidiah Morse; Richard C. Morse (1823), "Cambridge", A New Universal Gazetteer (4th ed.), New Haven: S. Converse
- William Darby; Theodore Dwight Jr. (1834), "Cambridge", New gazetteer of the United States of America (2nd ed.), Hartford: E. Hopkins
- City of Cambridge, Annual Report
  - 1848-1894
  - 1901-1921
  - 2003-present
- Cambridge Directory ... for 1848. 1848.

1850s-1870s

- John Hayward (1857), "Cambridge, Ms.", New England Gazetteer (2nd ed.), Boston: Otis Clapp, OCLC 3441657
- Charter and Ordinances of the City of Cambridge. Riverside Press. 1871.
  - Revised Ordinances of 1889 of the City of Cambridge. Cashman, Keating & Co. 1890.
- Dean Dudley (1872). Cambridge Directory. Cambridge: Published by Dean Dudley at 8 Congress Square, Boston.
- Cambridge Directory for 1873. Boston: Greenough, Jones & Co. 1873.
- Griffith Morgan Hopkins (1873). Atlas of the City of Cambridge. Philadelphia: G.M. Hopkins & Co. – via Harvard University. 1886 ed.
- Annual Report of the City Engineer, City of Cambridge. 1875-
- Cambridge in the 'Centennial': Proceedings, July 3, 1875, in Celebration of the Centennial Anniversary of Washington's Taking Command of the Continental Army. City Council. 1875.
- Greenough's Cambridge Directory. Boston: Greenough & Co.
  - 1875, 1876, 1878, 1879
  - 1880, 1889
  - 1890, 1899
  - 1900, 1909
- Lucius R. Paige (1877), History of Cambridge, Massachusetts, 1630-1877, Boston: H.O. Houghton and Company, OCLC 1305589, OL 7045727M
- "Cambridge (3.)" . Encyclopædia Britannica. Vol. 4 (9th ed.). 1878. p. 732.

1880s-1890s

- Samuel Adams Drake (1880), History of Middlesex County, Massachusetts, Boston: Estes and Lauriat, OL 23400952M
- Exercises in celebrating the two hundred and fiftieth anniversary of the settlement of Cambridge, held December 28, 1880, Cambridge, Massachusetts: University Press, John Wilson & Son, 1881, OL 23359150M
- (Cambridge and parts of Somerville). Vol. 6. New York: Sanborn Map and Publishing Co. 1888 – via Harvard University.
- George F. Crook, ed. Cambridge annual for 1886-1888.
- Blue Book of Cambridge for 1892. 1891.
- Gossiping Guide to Harvard and Places of Interest in Cambridge, Cambridge, Massachusetts: Cambridge Tribune, 1892, OCLC 4571172, OL 6943590M
- Park Commission, Annual Report, City of Cambridge 1894- . 1890s
- Atlas of the City of Cambridge. Philadelphia: G.W. Bromley and Co. – via Harvard University.. 1894?
- Blue Book of Cambridge for 1895. 1890.
- Arthur Gilman (1896), Cambridge of Eighteen Hundred and Ninety-Six, Cambridge: Riverside Press, OL 7062042M
- Walter Gee Davis, ed. (1897), Cambridge Fifty Years a City, 1846-1896, Cambridge: Riverside Press, OCLC 911131, OL 7145491M
- John Wesley Freese (1897), Historic Houses and Spots in Cambridge, Massachusetts, and Near-By Towns, Boston: Ginn & Company, OCLC 1821792, OL 7060328M
- Thomas Wentworth Higginson (1899), Old Cambridge, New York: Macmillan Company, OCLC 2220162, OL 528896M

=== Published in the 20th century ===
- Insurance Maps of Cambridge, Massachusetts. New York: Sanborn-Perris Map Company. 1900 – via Harvard University.
- Records of the Town of Cambridge (Formerly New-Towne) Massachusetts, 1630-1703, Cambridge, 1901, OL 7057190M
- Atlas of the City of Cambridge. Philadelphia: G.W. Bromley and Co. 1903 – via Harvard University. 1916 ed.
- Robert F. Roden (1905), The Cambridge Press, 1638-1692, NY: Dodd, Mead, and Company, OL 6964651M
- Massachusetts Daughters of the American Revolution, Hannah Winthrop Chapter, Cambridge (1907), An Historic Guide to Cambridge, Cambridge, Massachusetts, OCLC 3292475, OL 6981640M
- "Cambridge", United States (4th ed.), Leipzig: K. Baedeker, 1909, OCLC 02338437
- "Cambridge (Massachusetts)" . Encyclopædia Britannica. Vol. 5 (11th ed.). 1910. pp. 96–97.
- Cambridge Directory. Boston: Greenough & Co. 1910.
- Samuel A. Eliot (1913), A History of Cambridge, Massachusetts, 1630-1913, Cambridge, Massachusetts: Cambridge Tribune, OCLC 6876563, OL 6563862M
- Atlas of the City of Cambridge. G.W. Bromley & Co. 1930 – via State Library of Massachusetts.
- Norman Hill White Jr. (1931), Proceedings for the Years 1920 and 1921, Publications, vol. 15, Cambridge Historical Society, hdl:2027/wu.89067481739, "Printing in Cambridge Since 1800"
- Federal Writers' Project (1937), "Cambridge", Massachusetts: a Guide to its Places and People, American Guide Series, Boston: Houghton Mifflin, hdl:2027/mdp.39015014440781 + Chronology
- Survey of Architectural History in Cambridge: Northwest Cambridge, Cambridge Historical Commission, 1977, ISBN 0-262-53032-5
- Police Department, Annual Crime Report, City of Cambridge 1995- 2004-present
- "Cambridge". Historical Data Relating to Counties, Cities and Towns in Massachusetts. Boston: New England Historic Genealogical Society. 1997. pp. 28–29. (Timeline of boundary changes)
- "Commonwealth Communities: City of Cambridge". Commonwealth of Massachusetts Official Website. Archived from the original on February 15, 1998.
- Anthony Mitchell Sammarco (1999), Cambridge, Arcadia Publishing, OL 7981887M

=== Published in the 21st century ===
- "Timeline: 1972-1976", Harvard Crimson, June 5, 2001
- "Timeline 2001-2002", Harvard Crimson, June 6, 2002
- Natalie Moravek (2010), "Walking Tour", William James' Cambridge, Cambridge Historical Society
- "MIT Timeline". MIT 150. Massachusetts Institute of Technology. 2011.
- Rain Robertson (2012). "Cambridge's Culinary Culture". Cambridge Historical Society.
- "A Kendall Square Timeline", Boston Globe, February 2, 2014
- Saul Tannenbaum (February 21, 2014), The Case for Municipal Broadband in Cambridge, NeighborMedia, Cambridge Community Television

== Images ==
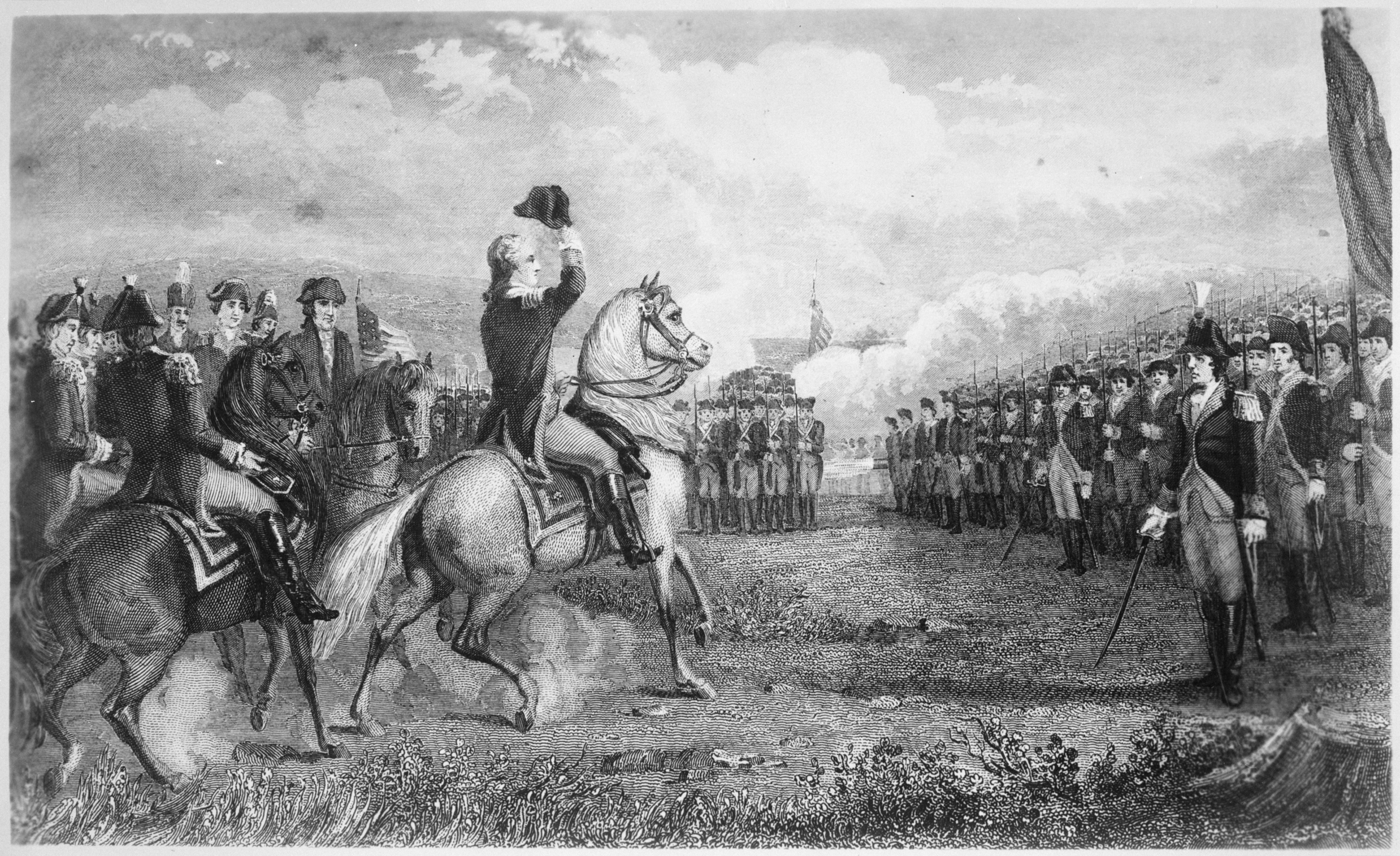
George Washington in Cambridge, 1775

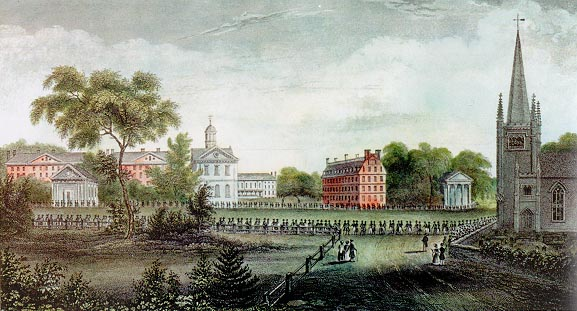
Harvard alumni procession, Harvard Square, 1836

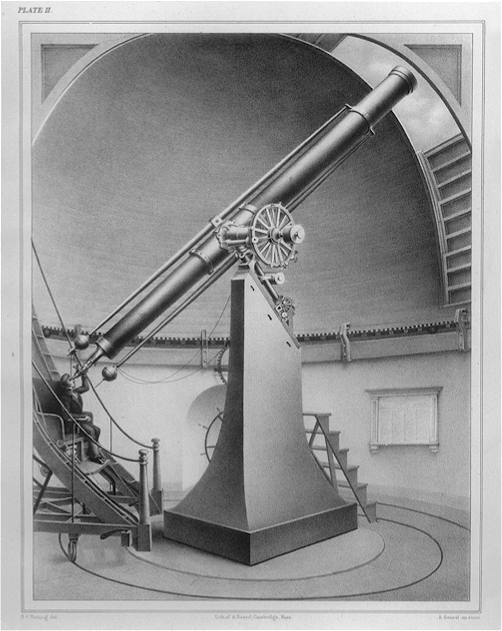
Cambridge Observatory, 1849

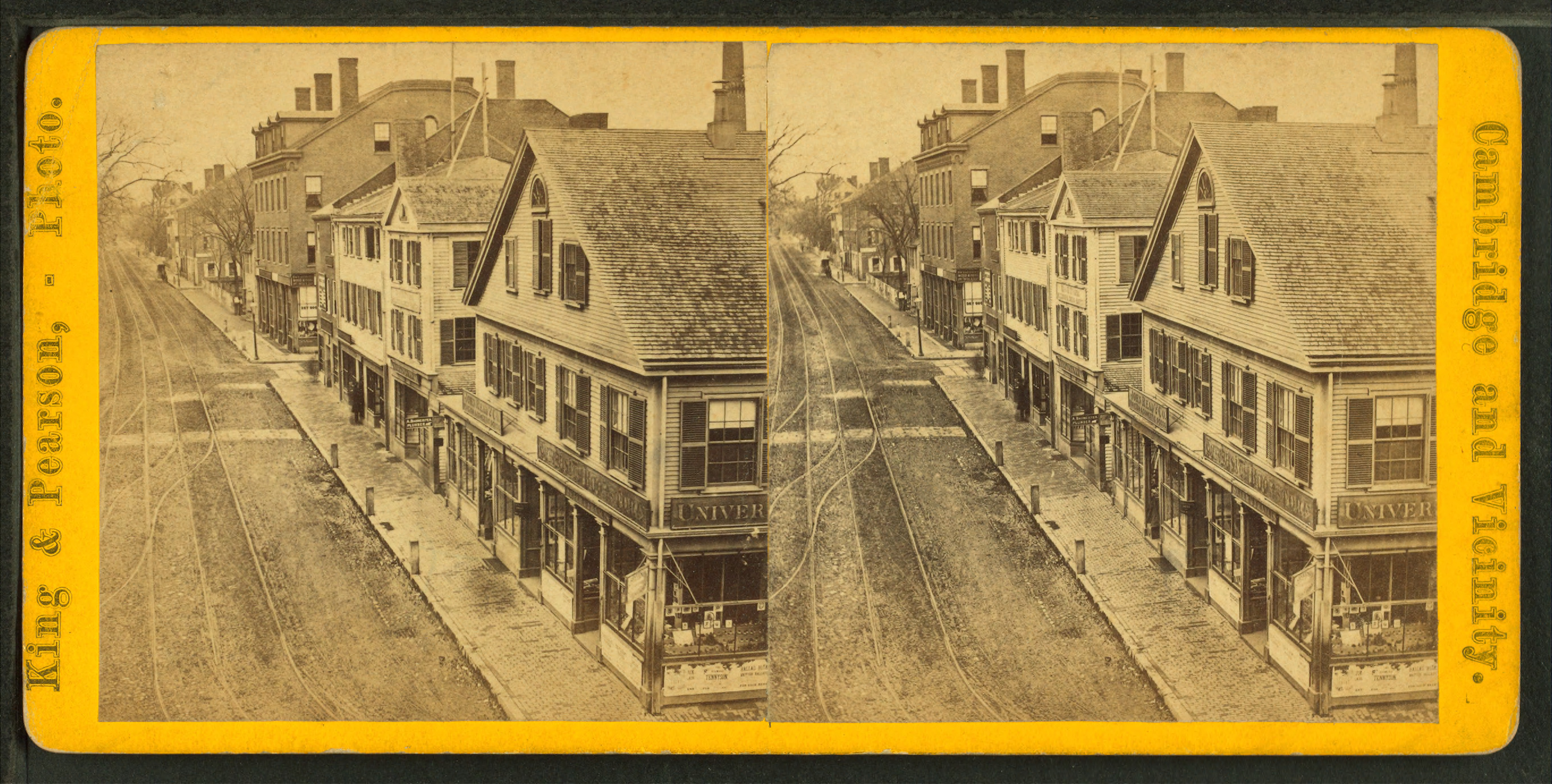
Harvard Square, ca.1880s-1900s

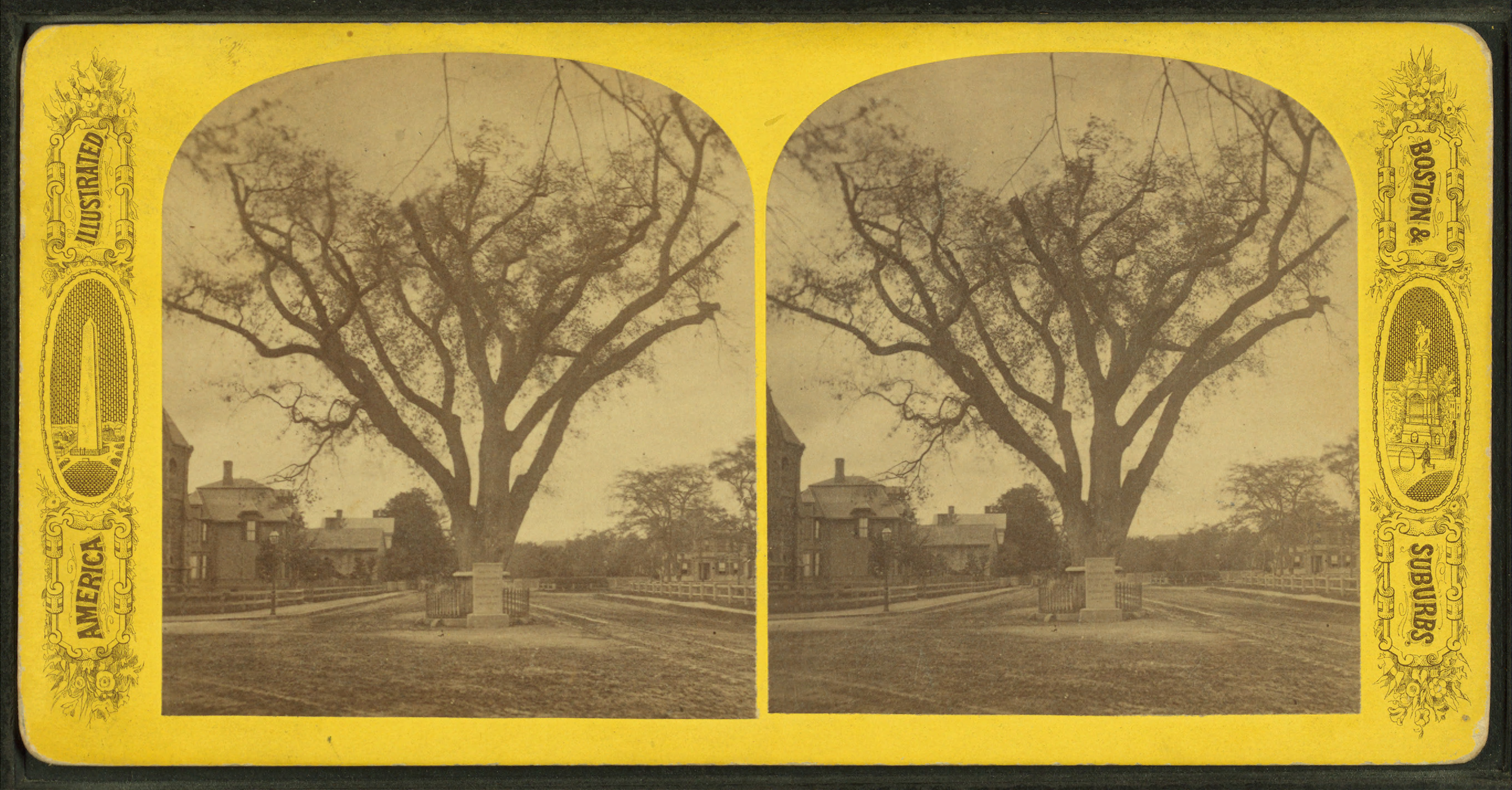
Washington Elm, Cambridge Common, ca.1880s-1900s

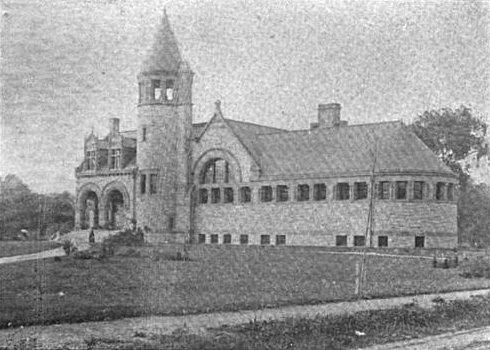
Cambridge Public Library, 1891

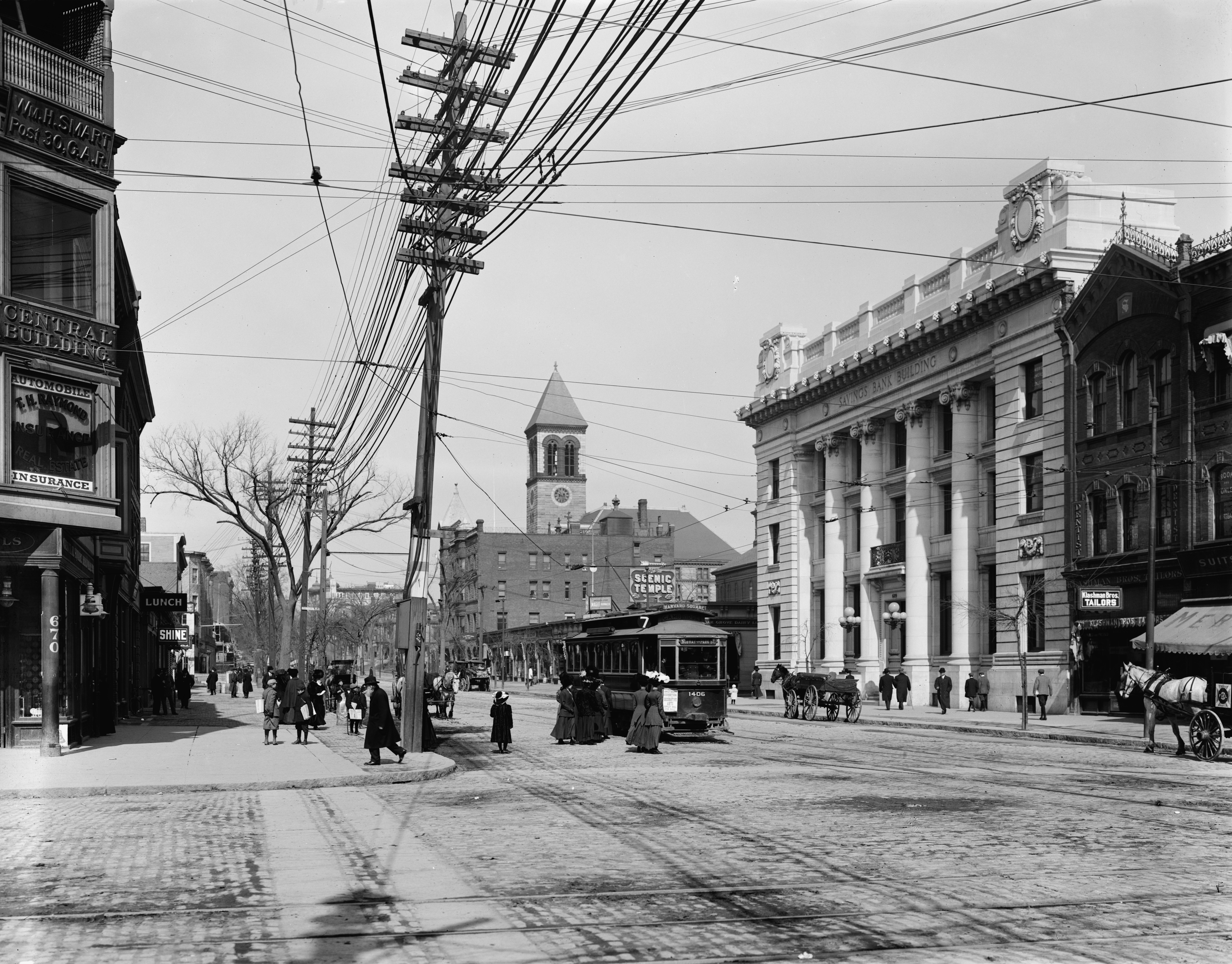
Central Square and Mass. Ave., 1910s

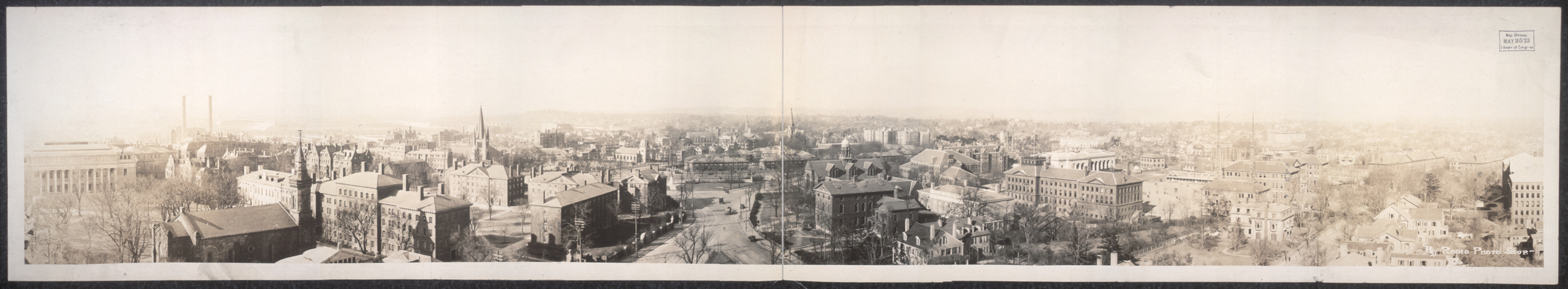
Overview of Harvard Square area, 1919

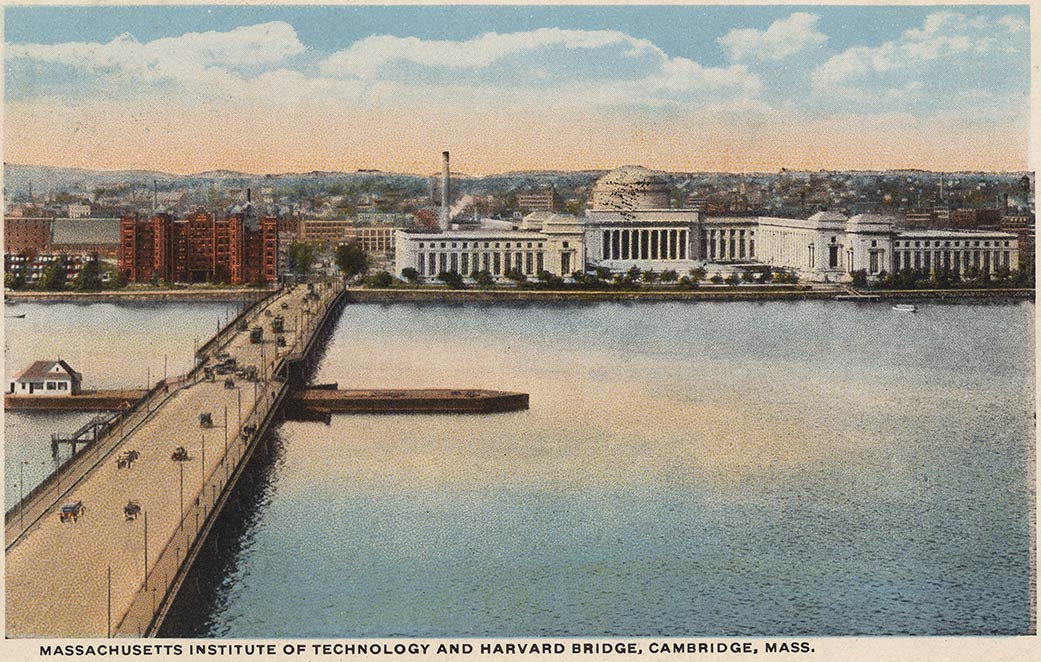
Harvard Bridge and MIT, ca.1920
