= Lechmere (disambiguation) =

Lechmere was a Massachusetts-based retail company.

Lechmere may also refer to:

== People ==
- Lechmere (surname)
- Lechmere, a fictional character in Benjamin Britten's 1971 opera Owen Wingrave, and in the short story by Henry James on which it was based

== In and around East Cambridge, Massachusetts ==
- Lechmere Canal, connecting to the Charles River
- Lechmere Point Corporation Houses, listed on the National Register of Historic Places
- Lechmere Square, at the intersection of Cambridge Street and First Street
- Lechmere station, a stop on the Green Line of the Massachusetts Bay Transit Authority
- Lechmere Viaduct, connecting to the West End neighborhood of Boston
- Lechmere Warehouse station, a former railroad stop in Woburn, Massachusetts

== Other ==
- Lechmere baronets, a title in the United Kingdom, established in 1818
- Lechmere, Inc. v. NLRB, a 1992 case heard by the Supreme Court of the United States
