= East Cambridge, Cambridge, Massachusetts =

Neighborhood of Cambridge, Massachusetts

Coordinates: 42°22′00″N 71°04′48″W

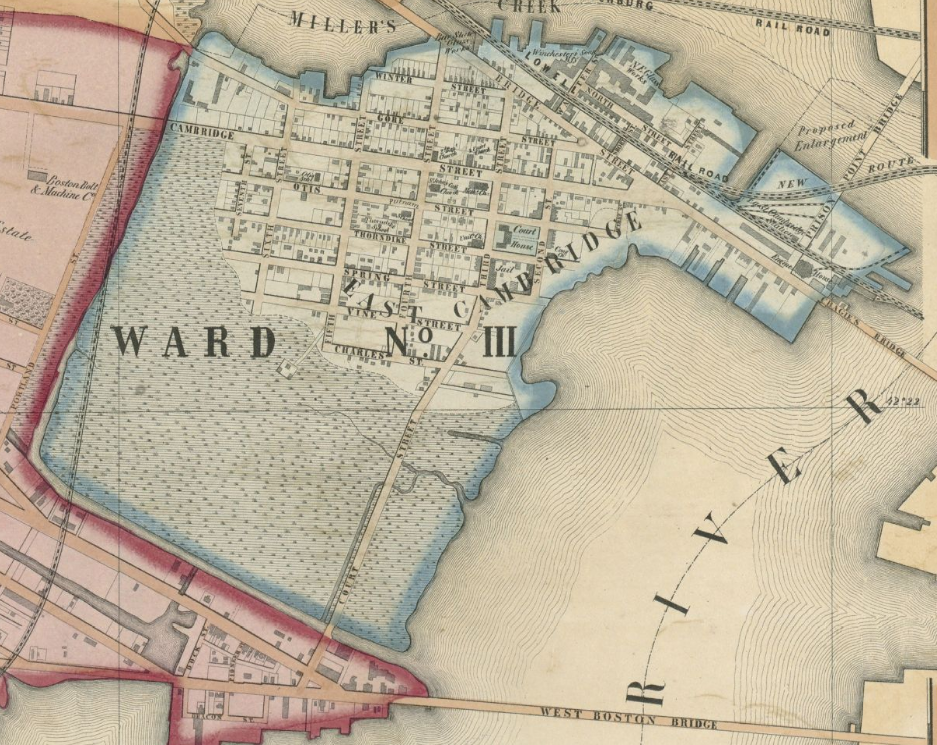
Detail of 1854 map of Cambridge, showing East Cambridge and vicinity. All of the swampy land shown in the ward between the Craigie Bridge and West Boston Bridge (now Longfellow Bridge) has since been landfilled and developed. Miller's River (here labeled Miller's Creek) was also filled and is now mainly a railroad yard. The Broad Canal follows Broadway and Portland Street.

East Cambridge is a neighborhood of Cambridge, Massachusetts. East Cambridge is bounded by the Charles River and the Charlestown neighborhood of Boston on the east, the Somerville border on the north, Broadway and Main Street on the south, and the railroad tracks on the west. Most of the streets form a grid aligned with Cambridge Street, which was laid out to directly connect what is now the Charles River Dam Bridge with what in 1809 was the heart of Cambridge, Harvard Square. The northern part of the grid is a roughly six by eight block residential area. Cambridge Street itself is retail commercial, along with Monsignor O'Brien Highway, the Twin Cities Plaza strip mall, and the enclosed Cambridgeside Galleria. Lechmere Square is the transportation hub for the northern side. The southern half of the grid is largely office and laboratory space for hundreds of dot-com companies, research labs and startups associated with MIT, biotechnology firms including Genzyme, Biogen and Moderna, the Athenaeum Press Building, light industry, an NRG Energy power station (formerly Mirant Kendall), and various small businesses. This half of the neighborhood is generally identified with Kendall Square. Along the waterfront are several hotels and taller apartment buildings.

== History and development ==
East Cambridge was originally an island at high tide, surrounded by marshland. The Millers River, called Willis Creek in colonial times, passed just to the north. The shoreline is shown as Lechmere's Point on Revolutionary War maps, and was the landing point for British troops en route to the Battles of Lexington and Concord.

The investors who constructed Craigie's Bridge encouraged the creation of the grid (which originally only extended to Charles and Sixth). By 1844, the island was connected to destinations on the mainland via a small number of roads: Harvard via Cambridge Street, what is now Kendall Square via Third Street (then Court Street), and two roads to Charlestown/Medford (Gore and Monsignor O'Brien Highway – formerly Bridge Street; this was before Somerville split from Charlestown).

The area became host to the Middlesex County courthouse designed by Charles Bulfinch; industries like soap, furniture, and the Boston Porcelain and Glass Company; merchants; lawyers; and residences from factory worker cottages to the upscale "Quality Row" and "Millionaire's Row".

Freight service between neighboring Charlestown and Lowell opened on the Middlesex Canal around 1802, while the Middlesex Turnpike connected Broadway with points north around 1810. The Boston and Lowell Railroad began parallel freight service in 1835.

The Fitchburg Railroad opened on the north side of the neighborhood in 1843, while the Grand Junction Railroad (later Boston and Albany Railroad) was constructed on the west side in 1847. A B&A rail yard north of Binney and Portland fed freight tracks which ran down neighborhood streets (some of which can still be seen) to industrial customers from Rogers and Potter Streets. (The curve of the yard can still be seen on an industrial building on Fulkerson Street, formerly Ninth.) The quirky Meigs Elevated Railway, a steam-powered monorail, ran as a demonstration project in the late 1800s. "East Cambridge Begins at The Tracks", a controversial slogan in the early 20th century, challenged neighborhood honor between the residents of East Cambridge and Wellington-Harrington.

Considerable landfill expanded the street grid to nearly its modern configuration by the 1920s, connecting with the surrounding neighborhoods but leaving the Lechmere Canal and part of the Broad Canal. The Miller's River has since been completely filled, except for a small remnant under the I-93 Charlestown interchange.

From 1895 to 1940, there was a wide public park between Commercial Street and the Charles River. Designed by Charles Eliot, it was called The Front; part of it was sold for private development in 1950. Another riverside park was eliminated by the Museum of Science, which opened on the Charles River Dam Bridge in 1951. Around 1956–57, additional ramps, referred to as the Cambridge Viaduct, were installed to double the capacity of Memorial Drive under the Longfellow Bridge. The ramps split the road into two carriageways, westbound using the original First Street underpass, and eastbound using the new viaduct. The new configuration prevents safe pedestrian access to a stairway to the Longfellow Bridge, requiring a longer path of travel than by following the original seawall.

The high-rise Middlesex Jail was constructed in 1971 on top of the former Cambridge Superior Courthouse.

The 1978 East Cambridge Riverfront Plan resulted in the redirection of traffic to Commercial Street, improving a narrower strip of parkland along Cambridge Parkway for recreational use. A widened Binney Street, the riverside apartment buildings, the CambridgeSide Galleria, and the re-landscaping of the remaining Lechmere Canal with access to The Front were also enabled by this plan. The plan envisioned relocating Lechmere Station to the north side of Monsignor O'Brien Highway with a pedestrian overpass.

Since the late 1990s, East Cambridge and its neighbor Lechmere Square have undergone a gentrification process, as old factories have been converted into condominiums and office space. The neighborhood is currently the site of most of large scale developments in Cambridge, including North Point, which plans over a dozen residential towers. In 2011, several new restaurants opened in the Kendall Square area. The relocation of Lechmere station was made part of a land swap arrangement to be paid for by the NorthPoint developers, but later became part of the Green Line Extension. The new station opened on March 21, 2022.

== Demographics ==
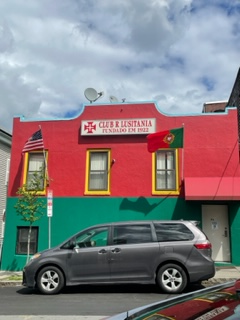
Club Lusitania, a Portuguese-American sports bar and club in East Cambridge on Fifth Street.

There are predominantly Irish and Portuguese natives, with a mix of Polish and Italians along with professionals who work in Boston and Kendall Square. It is predominantly a middle-class neighborhood, with over 96% of residents working in white collar industries.

Per American Community Survey, in 2019 East Cambridge had a population of 12,254 residents living in 5,816 households. The average household income was $140,245. 64% of them were United States born citizens, while 12.64% were citizens from abroad. 23.25% of residents were not United States citizens.

Since 2005, the average household income has risen and real estate values have increased significantly. The boom in Kendall Square area has brought a lot of development and modernization to the area.

== Notable residents ==
Dorothea Lynde Dix became an advocate for the humane treatment of the insane during the Antebellum era, during which time she volunteered as a Sunday school teacher in East Cambridge.
