= Zatko =

Zatko or Zaťko is a surname. Notable people with the surname include:

- Dušan Zaťko (born 1954), Czechoslovak slalom canoeist
- Juraj Zaťko (born 1987), Slovak volleyballer
- Peter Zaťko (1903–1978), Slovak economist
- Peter Zaťko (born 1983), Slovak wheelchair curler
- Peiter Zatko (born 1970), American computer security researcher
- Štefan Zaťko (born 1962), Slovak football manager

== See also ==
- Zatko v. California
