= Stump v. Sparkman =

1978 U.S. Supreme Court case on judicial immunity

- Supreme Court of the United States

Argued January 10, 1978 Decided March 28, 1978
- Full case name: Harold D. Stump, et al. v. Linda Kay Sparkman and Leo Sparkman
- Citations: 435 U.S. 349 (more) 98 S. Ct. 1099; 55 L. Ed. 2d 331; 1978 U.S. LEXIS 74

Case history
- Prior: Civ.No. F-75-129 (N.D. Ind. May 13, 1976) 552 F.2d 172 (7th Cir. 1977) Certiorari granted October 3, 1977, 434 U.S. 815, 98 S.Ct. 51, 54 L.Ed.2d 70
- Subsequent: Rehearing Denied June 5, 1978, 436 U.S. 951, 98 S.Ct. 2862, 56 L.Ed.2d 795 Remand 601 F.2nd 261 (7th Cir. 1979)

Holding
- A judge will not be deprived of immunity because the action he took was in error, was done maliciously, or was in excess of his authority. He will be subject to liability only when he has acted in the clear absence of all jurisdiction.

Court membership
- Chief Justice Warren E. Burger Associate Justices William J. Brennan Jr. · Potter Stewart; Byron White · Thurgood Marshall; Harry Blackmun · Lewis F. Powell Jr. William Rehnquist · John P. Stevens

Case opinions
- Majority: White, joined by Burger, Blackmun, Rehnquist, Stevens
- Dissent: Stewart, joined by Marshall, Powell
- Dissent: Powell
- Brennan took no part in the consideration or decision of the case.

Laws applied
- 42 U.S.C. § 1983

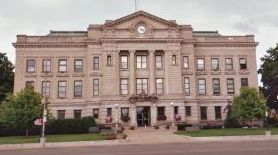
DeKalb County Court House, Auburn, Indiana. The chambers of the Circuit Court judge are at upper left.

Stump v. Sparkman, 435 U.S. 349 (1978), is the leading United States Supreme Court decision on judicial immunity. It involved an Indiana judge who was sued by a young woman who had been sterilized without her knowledge as a minor in accordance with the judge's order. The Supreme Court held that the judge was immune from being sued for issuing the order because it was issued as a judicial function. The case has been called one of the most controversial in recent Supreme Court history.

== Facts ==
In 1971, Judge Harold D. Stump granted a mother's petition to have a tubal ligation performed on her 15-year-old daughter, who the mother alleged was "somewhat retarded". The petition was granted the same day that it was filed. The judge did not hold a hearing to receive evidence or appoint a lawyer to protect the daughter's interests. The daughter underwent the surgery a week later, having been told that she was to have her appendix removed.

The daughter married two years later. Failing to become pregnant, she learned that she had been sterilized during the 1971 operation. The daughter and her husband sued the judge and others associated with the sterilization in federal district court.

The district court found that the judge was immune from suit. The Seventh Circuit Court of Appeals reversed the decision, holding that the judge had lost his immunity because he failed to observe "elementary principles of due process" when he ordered the sterilization. Finally, in 1978, the U.S. Supreme Court, in a 5-3 decision, reversed the Court of Appeals, announcing a test for deciding when judicial immunity should apply and holding that the judge could not be sued.

== Background ==
On July 9, 1971, Ora Spitler McFarlin of Auburn, Indiana, through her attorney Warren G. Sunday, presented a petition to Judge Harold D. Stump of the DeKalb County Circuit Court asking to have her 15-year-old daughter, Linda Spitler, surgically sterilized. The petition alleged that the daughter was "somewhat retarded", was associating with "older youth and young men" and that it would be in the daughter's best interest to undergo a tubal ligation "to prevent unfortunate circumstances."

Judge Stump signed the requested order ex parte the same day that he received the petition. The daughter had no notice of it. No guardian ad litem was appointed to represent her interest, and no hearing was held. Neither the petition nor the order was filed with the clerk of the circuit court, nor did the order cite any statutory authority for the action being taken.

On July 15, Linda Spitler entered DeKalb Memorial Hospital, just four blocks from her home. She was told that she was to have her appendix removed. The next day a tubal ligation was performed on her by Dr. John H. Hines, assisted by Dr. Harry M. Covell, and anesthesiologist Dr. John C. Harvey.

In 1973, Linda Spitler married Leo Sparkman. Failing to become pregnant, she learned from Hines in 1975 that she had been sterilized. The Sparkmans then brought an action for damages under 42 U.S.C. § 1983 and 42 U.S.C. § 1985(3) for alleged deprivation of Linda Sparkman's civil rights against Ora McFarlin, her attorney, Judge Stump, the doctors who performed the operation and the hospital where it was performed. Leo Sparkman asserted a pendent claim under state law for loss of potential fatherhood. Linda Sparkman also asserted pendent state claims for assault and battery and medical malpractice. The case was filed in the U.S. District Court for the Northern District of Indiana.

Linda Sparkman later changed her name to Jamie Renae Coleman and co-authored a 2003 book, The Blanket She Carried, with her friend Paula Headley.

=== Lower courts ===
The district court judge, Jesse E. Eschbach, dismissed the case, holding that the only state action, which was necessary to the federal claims, was Judge Stump's approval of the petition and that he was "clothed with absolute judicial immunity", thereby cutting off the claims against the other defendants as well. The Sparkmans appealed to the U.S. Court of Appeals for the Seventh Circuit, which reversed the dismissal.

Judicial immunity is the principle in which "a judge [has] complete protection from personal liability for exercising judicial functions". Applying the doctrine of judicial immunity adopted by the U. S. Supreme Court in Bradley v. Fisher in 1871 and held applicable to § 1983 actions in Pierson v. Ray in 1967, Judge Luther M. Swygert, writing for himself and Judges Harlington Wood Jr., and William G. East, found that immunity is available only when a judge has jurisdiction over the subject-matter of a case and that it is not available when he acts in "clear absence of all jurisdiction." Although Indiana statute law permitted the sterilization of institutionalized persons under certain circumstances, it provided for the right to notice, the opportunity to defend and the right to appeal. The Court of Appeals found no basis in statutory or common law for a court to order the sterilization of a minor child simply upon a parent's petition. It also held that Stump's action could not be justified as a valid exercise of the power of courts to fashion new common law. Concluding, Judge Swygert wrote:

Even if defendant Stump had not been foreclosed under the Indiana statutory scheme from fashioning a new common law remedy in this case, we would still find his action to be an illegitimate exercise of his common law power because of his failure to comply with elementary principles of procedural due process. Here a juvenile was ordered sterilized without the taking of the slightest steps to ensure that her rights were protected. Not only was the plaintiff not given representation, she was not even told what was happening to her. She was afforded no opportunity to contest the validity of her mother's allegations or to have a higher court examine whether the substance of those allegations, even if true, warranted her sterilization. Finally, the petition and order were never filed in court. This kind of purported justice does not fall within the categories of cases at law or in equity.

Stump and his co-defendants appealed to the U.S. Supreme Court, which granted certiorari and reversed the Court of Appeals.

== The holding ==
Associate Justice Byron White, writing for the five-member majority, disagreed with the determination by the Court of Appeals that there was a "clear absence of all jurisdiction" for Judge Stump to consider Ora McFarlin's petition, noting that Indiana law gave circuit courts "original exclusive jurisdiction in all cases at law and in equity" and jurisdiction over "all other causes, matters and proceedings where exclusive jurisdiction thereof is not conferred by law upon some other court, board or officer." Justice White acknowledged an intervening decision of the Indiana Court of Appeals in 1975 that held that a parent has no common-law right to have a minor child sterilized; but he reasoned that when presented with a petition like Ora McFarlin's, an Indiana circuit judge "should deny it on its merits rather than dismiss it for lack of jurisdiction." Noting that Judge Swygert found no Indiana law that authorized Judge Stump's action, Justice White observed:

...[I]t is more significant that there was no Indiana statute and no case law in 1971 prohibiting a circuit court, a court of general jurisdiction, from considering a petition of the type presented to Judge Stump.

Addressing Judge Swygert's assertion that even if Judge Stump had jurisdiction he was deprived of immunity because of his failure to observe elementary principles of procedural due process, Justice White countered:

A judge is absolutely immune from liability for his judicial acts even if his exercise of authority is flawed by the commission of grave procedural errors. The Court made this point clear in Bradley, 13 Wall., at 357, where it stated "[T]his erroneous manner in which [the court's] jurisdiction was exercised, however it may have affected the validity of the act, did not make it any less a judicial act; nor did it render the defendant liable to answer in damages for it at the suit of the plaintiff, as though the court had proceeded without having any jurisdiction whatever....

=== Test of a "judicial act" ===
The majority opinion went on to decide that the factors determining whether an act by a judge is a judicial act "relate to the nature of the act itself":

1. whether it is a function normally performed by a judge; and
2. whether the parties dealt with the judge in his judicial capacity.

In the view of the majority, Judge Stump's action passed this test. Even if his decision was erroneous, it was within his jurisdiction to consider Ora McFarlin's petition. Moreover, the parties dealt with Judge Stump in his capacity as a judge, not as a private individual. Accordingly, he could not be held liable for the consequences of his actions, even if they were arguably tragic.

== The dissent ==
=== Justice Stewart's dissent ===
Associate Justice Potter Stewart entered a vigorous dissent. Agreeing that judges of general jurisdiction enjoy absolute immunity for their judicial acts, he wrote, "...what Judge Stump did...was beyond the pale of anything that could sensibly be called a judicial act." Stating that it was "factually untrue" that what Judge Stump did was an act "normally performed by a judge", he wrote "...there is no reason to believe that such an act has ever been performed by any other Indiana judge, either before or since."

Justice Stewart also denounced it as "legally unsound" to rule that Judge Stump had acted in a "judicial capacity". "A judge is not free, like a loose cannon", he wrote, "to inflict indiscriminate damage whenever he announces that he is acting in his judicial capacity."

Concluding, Justice Stewart argued that the majority misapplied the law of the Pierson case:

Not one of the considerations...summarized in the Pierson opinion was present here. There was no "case," controversial or otherwise. There were no litigants. There was and could be no appeal. And there was not even the pretext of principled decision making. The total absence of any of these normal attributes of a judicial proceeding convinces me that the conduct complained of in this case was not a judicial act.

=== Justice Powell's dissent ===
Joining in Justice Stewart's opinion, Justice Lewis Powell filed a separate dissent that emphasized what he called "...the central feature of this case - Judge Stump's preclusion of any possibility for the vindication of respondents' rights elsewhere in the judicial system." Continuing, he wrote:

Underlying the Bradley immunity...is the notion that private rights can be sacrificed in some degree to the achievement of the greater public good deriving from a completely independent judiciary, because there exist alternative forums and methods for vindicating those rights.

But where a judicial officer acts in a manner that precludes all resort to appellate or other judicial remedies that otherwise would be available, the underlying assumption of the Bradley doctrine is inoperative.

== Legacy ==
The decision has been called one of the most controversial decisions in Supreme Court history.

External image
- Linda Sparkman views the 1907 Indiana Eugenics Law marker in Indianapolis, April 12, 2007

2007 marked the centennial of the 1907 Indiana sterilization law, the first of its kind in the world. Although Linda Sparkman was not sterilized under any of the eugenics laws still on the books in Indiana in 1971, she was invited to unveil a state historic marker describing the original law on April 12, 2007, in Indianapolis. Indiana repealed all laws concerning sterilization of the mentally ill in 1974.

== See also ==
- Buck v. Bell
- Skinner v. Oklahoma
- Mireles v. Waco
- Absolute immunity
- Compulsory sterilization
- Judicial discretion
- Judicial immunity
- Judicial misconduct
- List of United States Supreme Court cases, volume 435
- Miscarriage of justice
