= Mireles v. Waco =

- Supreme Court of the United States

Decided October 21, 1991
- Full case name: Mireles v. Waco
- Citations: 502 U.S. 9 (more)

Holding
- A state judge is absolutely immune to liability for acts committed while presiding over their court.

Court membership
- Chief Justice William Rehnquist Associate Justices Byron White · Harry Blackmun; John P. Stevens · Sandra Day O'Connor; Antonin Scalia · Anthony Kennedy; David Souter

Case opinions
- Per curiam
- Dissent: Stevens
- Dissent: Scalia, joined by Kennedy

Mireles v. Waco, 502 U.S. 9 (1991), was a United States Supreme Court case in which the court held that a state judge is absolutely immune to liability for acts committed while presiding over their court.

== Description ==
When a defense lawyer failed to appear for a scheduled hearing, the judge not only issued a bench warrant for his arrest, but instructed the police sent to arrest him to "rough him up a little" to teach him not to skip court dates. Although this was entirely unprofessional and possibly criminal, the judge was held, by the Supreme Court, to have absolute immunity from a lawsuit arising from the resulting beating, because the misbehavior occurred entirely within his activities as a judge presiding over a court.

Stevens dissented because he did not believe that ordering police officers to use excessive force was a judicial act. Justices Scalia and Kennedy dissented because the case did not receive briefing and argument before the decision; additionally, they believed the situation was so rare that a Supreme Court decision on the subject was unnecessary.

== See also ==
- Stump v. Sparkman
