= Meigs Elevated Railway =

Experimental monorail in Massachusetts

Coordinates: 42°22′22.6″N 71°04′47.9″W

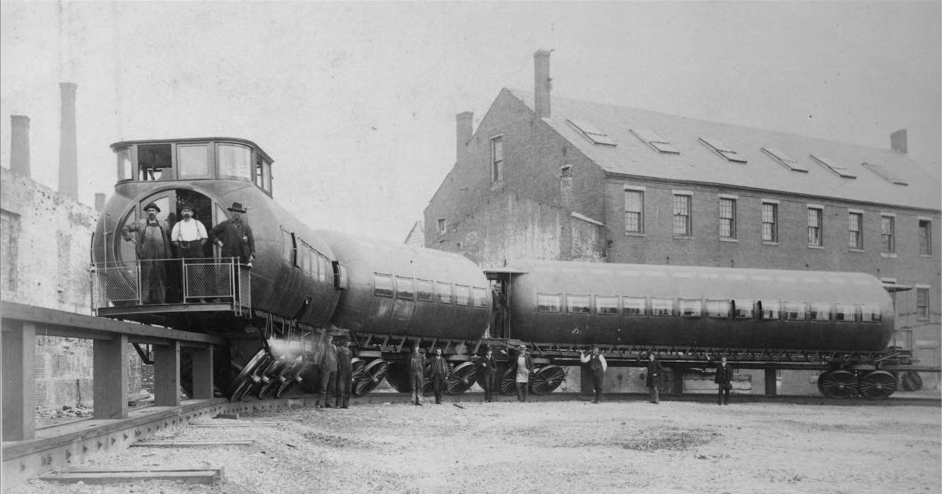

Overview
- Locale: East Cambridge, Massachusetts
- Transit type: Mechanical third rail traction
- Number of lines: 1

Operation
- Began operation: 1886
- Operator: Joe V. Meigs

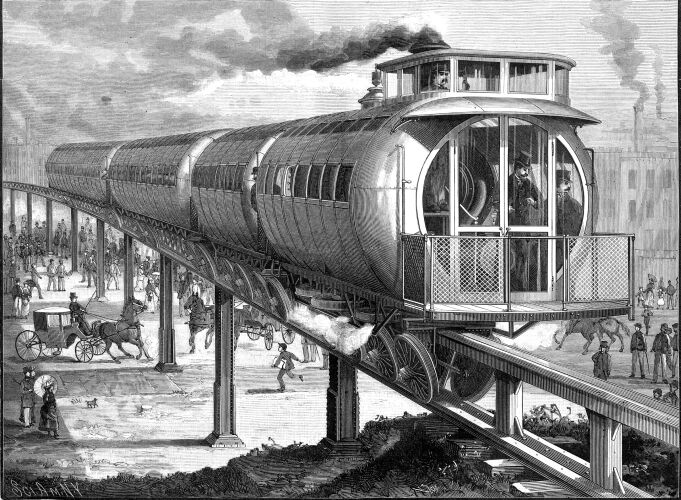
Meigs Elevated Railway

The Meigs Elevated Railway was an experimental but unsuccessful 19th-century elevated steam-powered urban rapid transit system, often described as a monorail but technically pre-electric third rail. It was invented in the United States by Josiah Vincent Meigs (also known as Joe Meigs or Joe Vincent Meigs), of Lowell, Massachusetts, and was demonstrated from 1886 to 1894 in a suburb of Boston called East Cambridge.

== History ==
=== Joe Meigs ===
Josiah Vincent Meigs, who answered to "Joe", was born into a well-connected professional family of Nashville, Tennessee. (His attorney father was a friend of Abraham Lincoln.) He served as captain of the Union Army during the American Civil War, and he made a personal appeal to President Lincoln for permission to raise a detachment of black troops for a colored artillery battery. This was the first of such to serve in the war.

After the war he was a lawyer in Washington. There he became close friends with a fellow veteran, General Benjamin Butler, and the two moved together to Lowell, Massachusetts, where they built adjacent houses. Butler became an influential state politician and was to serve as governor from 1882. Joe Meigs was proving himself to be a capable inventor and was responsible for the Meigs rifle as well as taking out several other firearms patents. In the 1880 US census and in the 1889 Lowell city directory, "inventor" was given as his profession.

=== Company ===
Joe Meigs thought out his rapid transit system in the early 1870s, and he patented it in 1875. It is comparable to the Aldershot narrow-gauge suspension railway, built in England in 1872.

As a result of exploiting his social connections in Massachusetts, he attracted substantial backing, including that of his friend General Butler. So, the two set up the Meigs Elevated Railway Company with Butler as president in 1881. The company hung out its shingle at 225 Bridge Street (now Monsignor O'Brien Highway) in East Cambridge, on a site in an industrial area previously occupied by the works of the Bay State Glass Company. It then began to lobby for a state charter to allow it to build rapid transit lines in the streets of Boston and its suburbs.

The company was finally chartered under state law in 1884. The authorised share capital was $200,000 (about $5,000,000 in 2020 values). However the company was not yet free to construct publicly, because the charter required the approval of the Boston City Council for any construction within city limits. Instead, it allowed the building of a short experimental line at the East Cambridge site. The text included the following proviso:

No location for tracks shall be petitioned for in the city of Boston, until at least one mile of the road has been built and operated, nor until the safety and strength of the structure and the rolling stock and motive power shall have been examined and approved by the board of railroad commissioners or by a competent engineer to be appointed by them.

Meigs amended his design, and he acquired a new patent in 1885.

=== Demonstration ===
The company raised $20,000 cash (about $500,000 in 2020 values), which was enough to build a full-sized experimental model comprising a short section of the elevated railway. This was to demonstrate the benefits and capabilities of the system under widely varying parameters, as demanded by the charter. The 227-foot (69 metre) iron demonstration line was erected on land abutting company headquarters in Bridge Street, and was opened to paying riders in June 1886. The company was permitted to run its line over Bridge Street, to end on property occupied by the hog slaughterhouse of John P. Squire and Company.

The actual erection was performed by a separate company founded by Meigs, the Meigs Elevated Railway Construction Company, which was intended to be in charge of construction of future lines.

The short length of demonstration line in iron was connected to the car shed by a longer wooden version, intended to test the capabilities of the system. This incorporated construction of several types is discernible in a surviving photo of the setup.

The rolling stock comprised three units: a locomotive, a tender and a passenger car.

In July 1886, the Scientific American magazine published an article entitled The Meigs Elevated Railway and containing this assertion:

Everything has worked in the most satisfactory manner, the train rounding the exceedingly sharp curves easily, and mounting the steep grades without trouble.

=== Promotion ===
A fire, supposedly the result of arson, broke out on the night of February 4, 1887, and destroyed Meigs's car shed as well as burning out the experimental coach. The locomotive and tender escaped. A photo survives of the damage, which Meigs claimed amounted to $10,000 ($250,000 in 2020 values).

Meigs wrote an extensive explanation of how his urban transit system would function, complete with diagrams and statistics, and entitled it The Meigs Railway System: The Reasons For Its Departures From The Ordinary Practice. The work was published later in 1887, and followed by a privately published booklet, The Mechanics of the Meigs Railway, in 1888.

However, no urban rapid transit company outside the Boston area made use of the system. The Lake Street Elevated Railroad of Chicago intended to use it when chartered in 1888, but changed its policy and settled on a conventional design before beginning construction.

Some international interest was demonstrated in the same year by the publication in Paris, France of a work by Charles Thirion entitled Nouveau Système de Chemin de Fer Aérien Monorail. Nothing came of this, either. This book shows an early use of the term "monorail" to describe the system.

Also the Massachusetts charter was renewed in 1888, but in December of that year the first electric streetcar line in Boston was opened. The experimental establishment at East Cambridge was mothballed in 1891.

Meigs continued campaigning for a line of his system from Boston to Cambridge, but was hostile to the new electric traction. In 1893, he published a booklet entitled True Rapid Transit wherein he rejected both the building of subways and the use of electric power, insisting that steam engines were more economical. In April of that year, the Cambridge experimental train made a single trial trip which was its last. The line was dismantled in 1894, not because of failure but because it had performed its function and Meigs expected to begin construction of a Boston to Cambridge line soon.

=== Failure ===
In July 1894, the Boston Elevated Railway company was incorporated to build a conventional elevated line from Boston to Cambridge, Roxbury, Charlestown and South Boston. Meigs acquired the franchise, but continued to refuse to countenance the use of electric power. This alienated investors and the public, and he was unable to raise any funds for construction. So, in 1896 he sold the franchise and gave up.

The final failure of the Meigs Elevated Railway was owing to its being rejected by Boston investors. When the Boston Elevated Railway reverted to a conventional layout, the money problem went away and the first stretch of elevated line was opened in 1901.

Joe Meigs died of a stroke at home in Charlestown in 1907, and was buried according to the rites of the Unitarian Church.

=== Remembrance ===
The Meigs system involved two lower load-bearing rails and a central gripper-traction rail, but it has habitually been referred to as a monorail in published sources despite not being one. There is a passing resemblance to the Lartigue Monorail, which in contrast had a central load-bearing rail and two lower guide rails.

In 1876, the Cambridge Historical Commission began a campaign to attach Blue Oval Historical Markers to buildings on sites of historical importance. One was attached to the old Genoa Packing Company building, not at number 225 (which is the Alles Building) but at 221 next door. This was demolished in 2013, and replaced by the Fairfield Inn & Suites which is part of the Marriott chain. The plaque has not reappeared, and is listed by the commission as "marker not currently installed".

The text read: "Meigs' Experimental Railway. Joseph V. Meigs, inventor and entrepreneur, successfully tested a steam-powered elevated monorail train intended for rapid transit use in Boston. 1886."

Joe Meigs's extensive collection of papers and drawings relating to the system, as well as correspondence and genealogical material, is held at the Manuscripts and Archives Department of the Sterling Memorial Library at Yale University. An early notebook of his, 1854–66, includes early sketches of parts of the system and is part of the MIT Libraries collections.

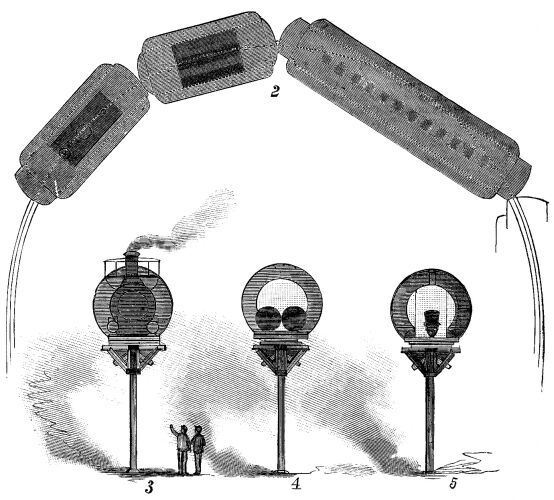
Top view: Fig. 2 is a plan view of a train on a sharp curve, Fig. 3 is an end view of the track and the engine, Fig. 4 is a section through tender and track, and Fig. 5 is a section through the car

== Layout of experimental line ==
The following description is based on a plan, with annotations, published in The Meigs Railway System: The Reasons For Its Departures From The Ordinary Practice, page 177.

The company's premises were on the north side of Bridge Street, number 225 (now Monsignor O'Brien Highway). This road runs roughly east to west. Just west of the company offices, adjacent to and parallel with the street, was a car shed with an adjacent workshop on its north side. Both ends of the shed had large doors through which the train could run.

The experimental line ("trial road") began west of the shed and ran through it at just above ground level, but then rose on a continuous gradient of 2% round a 180 degree curve of 50 feet (15 metres) radius and 165 feet (50 metres) long. The line then ran west parallel to the north side of the car shed, before turning on a 45 degree curve before continuing south-west across the street to its terminus. This section to the second curve also had sections of grades, variable at 4.5%, 5.7% and finally 6.5% on the curve.

Most of the construction was of wood, but the final section of 227 feet (69 metres) over the street was in iron as proposed for future rapid transit construction. Photos exist of the train posed on this section.

The line had differing construction techniques:

- Wooden construction of the cheapest possible kind, suitable "for yard use, not for traffic" -from the beginning of the line to the shed's west door.
- Wooden construction, with low track following the contour of the ground -through the shed to the start of the main curve.
- Wooden construction, with continuous grade secured by increasing the heights of the wooden support posts -around the main curve.
- Wooden construction beginning level but with variable grades thereafter created by varying pole heights -end of main curve to end of second curve. The latter had the steepest grade, at 6.5%.
- Iron construction, increasing in height until the street crossing was reached at a height of 14 feet (4.25 metres) above the ground was reached. Then came a level stretch across the street to the end buffers. This was deliberately built with a slight curve but out of straight track girders to show that the system did not need to have specially curved girders to negotiate shallower curves. A photo exists of the deliberately kinked track.

== Macke's Three-Rail System ==
The Meigs system had a three-rail competitor proposed for Boston between 1888 and 1891, and discussed by the Massachusetts state legislature. Unlike with the Meigs system, no demonstration line was built. It featured two load-bearing rails and a third traction rail in a gully between the two, with vertical driving wheels attached to the rail by wrap-round flanges.

== Description of Meigs system ==
=== Overview ===
Block quotations in the following description are from the 1886 Scientific American article, and the description is based on this.

The basic premise for the design of the system was to make the street-level footprint of the line as narrow as possible, to ameliorate the problem of shadowing created by conventional urban elevated railroads. This entailed a single row of iron pillars of variable height, connected by single horizontal girders. On top of these girders was a pair of load-bearing rails, close together. In between the rails was a row of short posts, bearing a thick third rail. Each item of rolling stock (locomotive, tender or passenger car) had two trucks or bogies, each with four wheels. These wheels were angled inwards to sit on the load-bearing rails. In addition, each truck had a pair of horizontal spring-mounted gripper wheels which pinched the central upper rail. In non-powered vehicles these were for stability and braking, but in the locomotive these provided the drive in addition. This central rail was not load-bearing. The gripper mechanism allowed trains to manage steep gradients.

The rolling stock had the form of horizontal cylinders, including the locomotives, and the edges of the cylinders were rounded. This was an early example of the deliberate design feature of streamlining, which featured in publicity:

This system is as applicable for surface as for elevated railroads. It is cheaper to build than an ordinary road, as the design of the rolling stock allows the contour of the ground to be more closely followed. As an elevated road in cities, the permanent structure presents far less obstruction to light and air than the usual form. The center of gravity of the cars and engine is brought down as low as possible, thereby lessening the effect of leverage caused by wind pressure. The smooth, even surface of the exterior of the entire train serve to decrease the resistance to the wind, and permits a high rate of speed.

=== Permanent way ===
The following description is for the expected standard iron construction. As the experimental line demonstrated, much of the construction could have been replaced with wood (timber).

The hollow iron support pillars were made up of two C-shaped bars, back to back and bolted together with two strap bars. No specifications were given for the cross-section, "which may be varied as demanded by location", but a standard pillar was suggested at 20 feet (6 metres) comprising 6 feet (1.8 metres) underground on foundations specified for the local geology and 14 feet (4.3 metres) clear, with an additional 4 feet (1.2 metres) occupied by the permanent way at the top.

These pillars were to be free-standing, not stayed.

The permanent way on which the trains were to run consisted, firstly of a line of single iron structural support girders on the tops of the pillars. On top of these was a line of narrower single girders or track beams (so-called) to which the load-bearing rails were to be fixed. A pair of U-shaped girders, facing upwards, was bolted to the sides of each track beam, and filled with longitudinal baulks of timber. The upper outer edges of the baulks were beveled at 45 degrees, and the rails fixed to the bevel surfaces so as to be angled out at the same inclination. The rails, baulks and track beam were fastened together with single bolts passing clear through. The gauge of the load-bearing rails was 22.5 inches (57 cm) between the outer edges.

The support girders were not stayed, either.

The track beams were interrupted by short posts 42 inches (107 cm) high and sitting on the support girders, and bearing the central traction rail (also referred to as the upper track beam) which was a girder 17.5 inches (44.5 cm) thick. This thickness included iron straps, replaceable when worn, which were fixed along the sides so as to leave a slot along the bottom of each side. The flanges of the horizontal gripper wheels fitted into these slots. The support posts were supplemented by diagonal trusses, as seen in photos of the experimental line.

The experimental line did not feature junction arrangements, so these only appear in print. A swing bridge arrangement was envisaged:

A junction switch is formed of a single swinging section, turning upon a hinge of great strength attached to one of the pillars. A movement of four or five feet (1.2 to 1.5 metres) by the free end of the switch was enough to permit the cars and trucks on one track to clear the end of the other track. The free end travels upon a carriage provided with rollers, moving upon a supporting rail. Suitable mechanism is provided for operating the switch and locking it in place.

The switch would have had to be operated manually, somehow.

Neither the experimental line nor published illustrations gave any indications as to how routine inspection and maintenance of the permanent way were to have been carried out, without recourse to ladders or scaffolding erected in the street below.

=== Wheel system ===
Each item of rolling stock had two trucks or bogies, with four flanged load-bearing wheels each. The major peculiarity of the latter was that they were not vertical, but angled inwards:

Each truck consists of a horizontal rectangular wrought iron frame, stiffened by cast iron pieces and provided with stiff pedestals bolted to its under side, in which were fixed short axles for the wheels. Each truck had four wheels set at an angle of about 45 degrees, the axles being so inclined.

Since the axles were fixed, the bearings would have been in the wheel hubs.

Also, each truck had a pair of horizontal gripper wheels, located in between the two pairs of load-bearing wheels which were about 4 feet (1.2 metres) apart. These gripper wheels were 42 inches (107 cm) in diameter and 3.5 inches (9 cm) thick, and the two wheels rotated independently of each other, not being coupled. They were also flanged, on their lower edges, and these flanges fitted into the slots in the sides of the central traction rail. The vertical wheel axles slotted into box slides fixed to the frame, containing springs which pushed the wheels against the rail. The functions of the wheels were, firstly, to stabilise the vehicle against any rolling motion and, secondly, to be part of the hydraulic braking system. Meigs considered that the braking power of the wheels was adequate, but allowed that the load-bearing wheels could be provided with brakes too.

The flanges of the gripper wheels were to hold the vehicle onto the track, so that it was unable to fall off. However, the truck frame was also provided with lugs in the event of wheel assembly breakage:

In case any or all of the wheels should break, provision is made to prevent the cars from overturning or leaving the track, by means of a strong shoe, which would slide upon but could not leave the way.

The horizontal gripper wheel design was also followed by the separate pair of traction wheels on the locomotive.

The vehicle undercarriage consisted of two chassis frames, connected by side trusses on which the vehicle body sat and to which was fixed the floor assembly. Each chassis frame had four vertical tubes containing heavy spiral springs, and these fitted into spring sockets bolted to the underneath of the floor assembly. The chassis frame was attached to its truck frame by a centre turn pin stayed by rods attached to sliders, so as to allow free rotation of the chassis on the truck. When running through curves, the trucks turned on the gripper wheels and it was claimed that the design allowed for very tight turning:

It has been found that, by reason of the independent motion of all the truck wheels, curves were followed so closely that the increase of friction of the car wheels passing through curves even as small as 50 feet radius, was too slight to be noticed or measured in a model one-eighth full size. This construction of the trucks would allow a car 50 feet (15 metres) long to from a street only 28 feet (8.5 metres) wide into another of the same width.

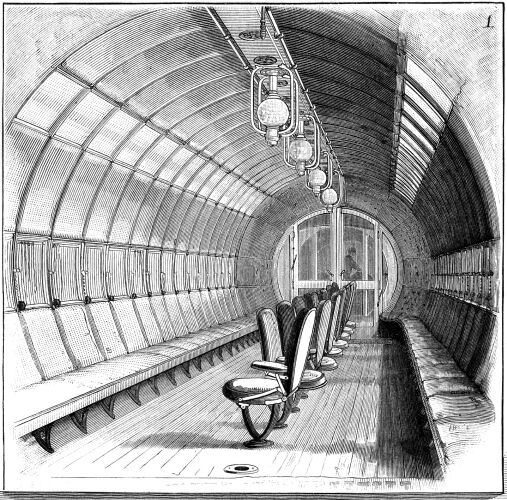
Internal view

=== Passenger car ===
The floor of the passenger car was a frame of C-channel beams of 5 inch (12.7 cm) gauge. It was 51.16 feet (15.6 metres) long, and 7.5 feet (2.3 metres) wide. The cylindrical car body was formed of hoops of light iron T-bars bent into a circle of diameter 10.7 feet (3.26 metres). The publicity emphasised the luxuriousness of the fitting out:

The cars possess many novel features, both outside and inside. The circular section and rounded ends admit of the strongest possible construction, without an overweight of material. The framing of the body is filled in by panels covered with rich upholstering, which covers all the interior. The exterior is sheathed with paper and copper. While adding to the strength, this form is expected to diminish the wind resistance fully one-third. The interior of the car is light, roomy, and pleasing to the eye. The seats are upholstered like the rest of the car, and comfort and luxury have been carefully studied in every detail. At each window was a specially designed device for securing ventilation without the annoyance caused by dust. There is an entire absence of sharp corners, so that, in case of a serious accident, the liability of the passenger being greatly injured is largely avoided.

There is no mention of any insulation, or of heating arrangements for winter. Despite the reference to copper sheathing, the surviving photo of the fire damage indicates that the metal used in the experimental car was cheaper, with a lower melting point.

The car had two rows of horizontal rectangular windows down each side, with the frames fitted in between the hoops and attached to them. The ends had open platforms for entry and exit, with canopies, and passengers passed into the body of the car via swing doors with glass panels and spring closures. Lighting was by hanging oil lamps. There was a continuous run of padded and upholstered seating down each side, with backs resting against the curve of the cylinder. In addition, there was a line of swivel or barbershop chairs along the major axis. The floor had a carpet. A photo survives with the annotation that there was seating for 72 persons. There was absolutely no provision for standing passengers -there was nothing for them to hold on to.

=== Tender ===
The tender was a completely separate vehicle from the locomotive, only connected by the coupling, as discernible in posed photographs. Not described are the arrangements for the fireman to obtain coal for the locomotive's firebox without risking a fall into the street below.

This vehicle was in the same style as the passenger coach, but without end platforms and shorter, at 24.5 feet (7.5 metres). It had the same two rows of windows on each side, but six in each row.

Inside was a water tank, a bunker for the coal and "additional room for other purposes". The possibility of parcels traffic was not plainly stated.

=== Locomotive ===
The locomotive also was in the same cylindrical style, with a floor 29.25 by 7.5 feet (8.9 by 2.3 metres) and having similar fenestration, with seven windows in each lower row. The upper window rows, however, were interrupted by a glazed turret which was the engineer's cab and so had five windows each. For the experimental train this cab only gave a view forwards and to the sides, but drawings of hypothetical trains in service show the cab to have a 360 degree view. Turning engines and marshalling trains to have the locomotive in front would have been very challenging to the system (the experimental line had no turntable), and running in reverse half the time would have been desirable. The front of the locomotive had a large circular door in plate glass panels without protection, and was fronted by an open access platform. There was no cowcatcher.

The two locomotive trucks were close together, but otherwise were of the same design as those of the other vehicle. Between them was a pair of gripper driving wheels, similar to the truck gripper wheels but larger at 44.6 inches (113 cm) in diameter. They had vertical steel (not iron) axles six inches (15 cm) thick. Each wheel had its own driving mechanism, fed from a single boiler.

The following is the Scientific American description of the locomotive specifications:

The boiler was of the locomotive type (that is, a fire-tube boiler), 60 inches (152 cm) in diameter and 15 feet 94.6 metres) in length. It was placed over the driving mechanisms, its center line being 61 inches (155 cm) above the floor. There were 200 tubes, 2 inches (5 cm) in diameter and 7 feet (2.1 metres) long; the firebox was 4.5 feet (1.4 metres) square. The crown sheet was arched, and inclined downward at the back end to allow of climbing and descending grades equal to 15% without exposing any uncovered part to the fire (and so causing an explosion).

The cylinders were 12 by 22 inches (30 by 56 cm); their center lines were placed 18 inches (45 cm) above the floor, and 61 inches (155 cm) apart. The piston rods connected with independent crossheads gliding upon steel girders, supported at their ends by standards bolted to the floor beams.

The driving wheel axles extended through a sliding box containing the journals. The boxes slid in cast iron runners placed at right angle to the line of the engine, and each axle had a crank keyed upon its upper end. The well known slotted yoke connection was used. The slide valves were of the usual locomotive form. The links were placed in a horizontal instead of a vertical position, and were operated by two bellcranks. The throttle valve, link rod, brake and coupling rods, also the connection between the driving boxes for producing pressure against the rails, were operated by hydraulic power, although hand levers were also provided.

Adhesion of the driving wheels to the rails was obtained by means of a cylinder and piston secured to the sliding boxes. The engineer had before him five hydraulic cocks, which adjusted the throttle, links, sliding boxes of the driving wheels, brakes and the coupling rods of the entire train, while just above were steam and hydraulic pressure gauges and indicators, whistle and bell ropes.

The fireman was stationed behind the boiler, at the rear of the locomotive and so well away from the engineer.

The reference to a control for coupling rods was as regards a claimed safety feature:

One turn of the cock controlling the couplings unlocked them and divided the train into its component cars, each of which had a brake which acted automatically upon detachment from the train. This partially destroyed the momentum of the whole, and a collision could only take place by a succession of comparatively light blows from the engine and slowing cars of the train, instead of by a single blow with the momentum of the whole train. The brakes were operated upon the balancing wheels of the trucks.

== Gallery ==
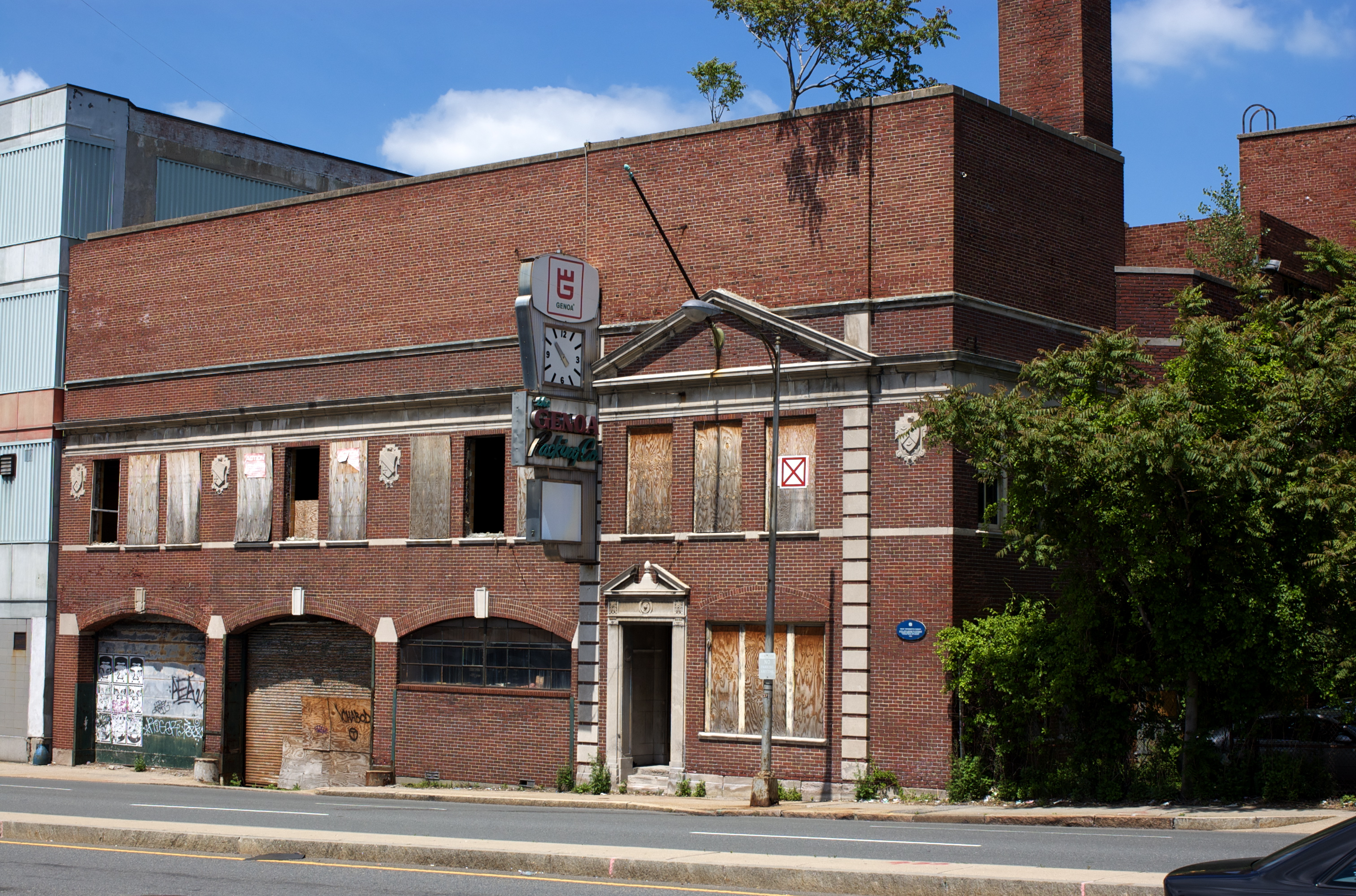
The railway site in 2010. A blue plaque can be seen on the side of the former Genoa Packing Co. building, which was demolished in 2013.

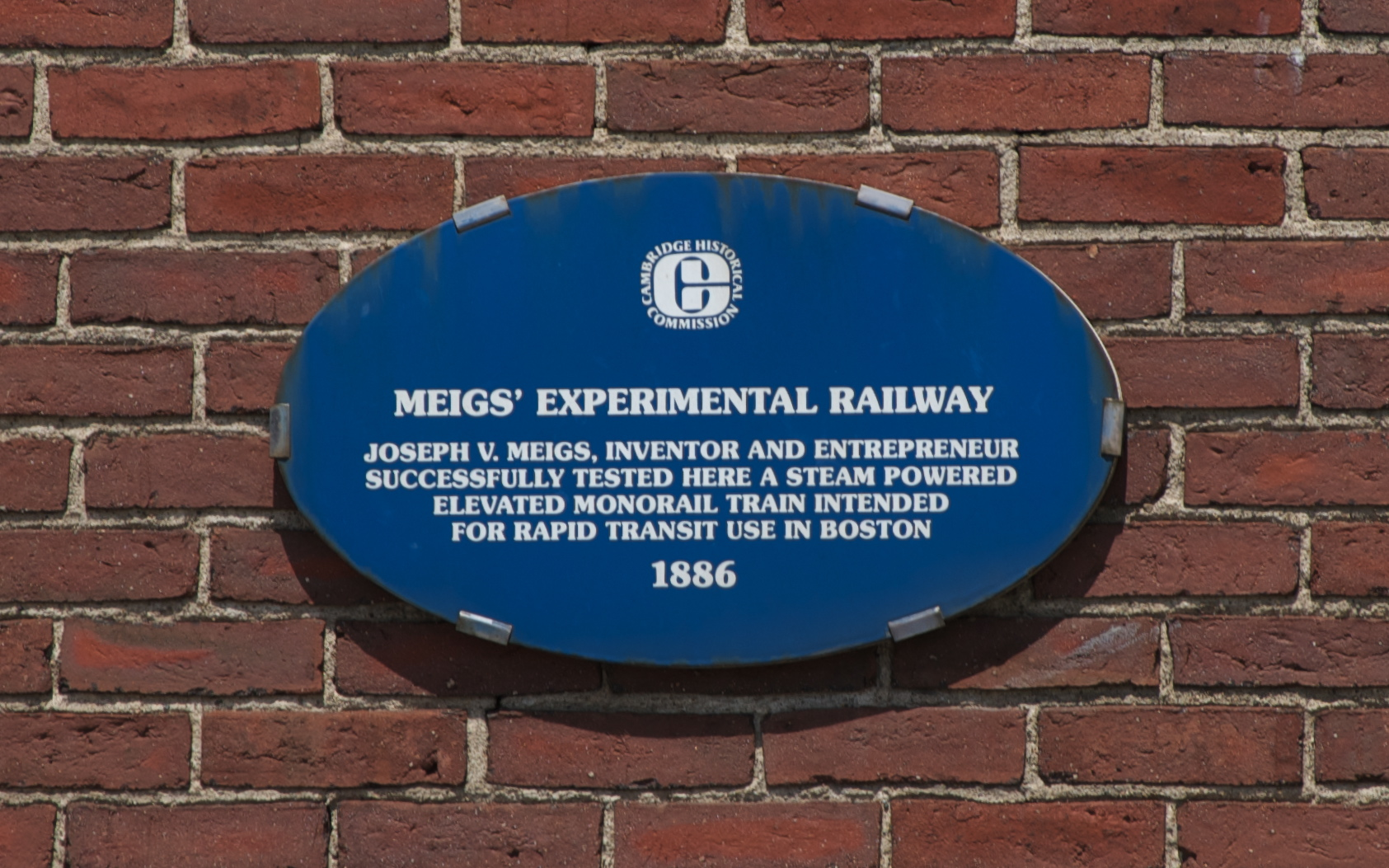
Plaque marking the site on the side of the former Genoa Packing Co. building.
