= List of United States Supreme Court cases, volume 502 =

This is a list of all the United States Supreme Court cases from volume 502 of the United States Reports:

Case name	Citation	Date decided
United States v. Ibarra	502 U.S. 1	1991
Mireles v. Waco	502 U.S. 9	1991
Zatko v. California	502 U.S. 16	1991
Hafer v. Melo	502 U.S. 21	1991
State officers may be held personally liable for damages under § 1983 based upon actions taken in their official capacities.
FRS v. MCorp Fin., Inc.	502 U.S. 32	1991
Griffin v. United States	502 U.S. 46	1991
The Due Process Clause of the Fifth Amendment does not require that a general guilty verdict on a multiple-object criminal conspiracy case be set aside if the evidence is inadequate to support conviction as to one of the objects.
Estelle v. McGuire	502 U.S. 62	1991
Southwest Marine, Inc. v. Gizoni	502 U.S. 81	1991
A maritime worker whose occupation is one of those enumerated in the Longshore and Harbor Workers' Compensation Act may be a seaman within the meaning of the Jones Act.
Wooddell v. Electrical Workers	502 U.S. 93	1991
Gibson v. Florida Bar	502 U.S. 104	1991
Dismissed as improvidently granted.
Simon & Schuster, Inc. v. Crime Victims Board	502 U.S. 105	1991
The Son of Sam law is inconsistent with the First Amendment.
Ardestani v. INS	502 U.S. 129	1991
Union Bank v. Wolas	502 U.S. 151	1991
Department of State v. Ray	502 U.S. 164	1991
INS v. National Center for Immigrants' Rights, Inc.	502 U.S. 183	1991
Hilton v. South Carolina Pub. Rys. Comm'n	502 U.S. 197	1991
King v. St. Vincent's Hosp.	502 U.S. 215	1991
Hunter v. Bryant	502 U.S. 224	1991
In re Blodgett	502 U.S. 236	1992
Smith v. Barry	502 U.S. 244	1992
Yakima Cnty. v. Yakima Nation	502 U.S. 251	1992
The Indian General Allotment Act of 1887 permits a county to impose an ad valorem tax on reservation land patented in fee pursuant to the Allotment Act and owned by reservation members or the tribe itself, but it does not allow the county to enforce its excise tax on sales of such land.
Norman v. Reed	502 U.S. 279	1992
Molzof v. United States	502 U.S. 301	1992
INS v. Doherty	502 U.S. 314	1992
White v. Illinois	502 U.S. 346	1992
The Confrontation Clause does not require that, before a trial court admits testimony under the spontaneous declaration and medical examination exceptions to the hearsay rule, either the prosecution must produce the declarant at trial or the trial court must find that the declarant is unavailable.
Rufo v. Inmates	502 U.S. 367	1992
Dewsnup v. Timm	502 U.S. 410	1992
Wyoming v. Oklahoma	502 U.S. 437	1992
INS v. Elias-Zacarias	502 U.S. 478	1992
Presley v. Etowah Cnty.	502 U.S. 491	1992
Lechmere Inc. v. NLRB	502 U.S. 527	1992
