= Broad Canal =

Canal in Cambridge, Massachusetts

Coordinates: 42.362511°N 71.079211°W

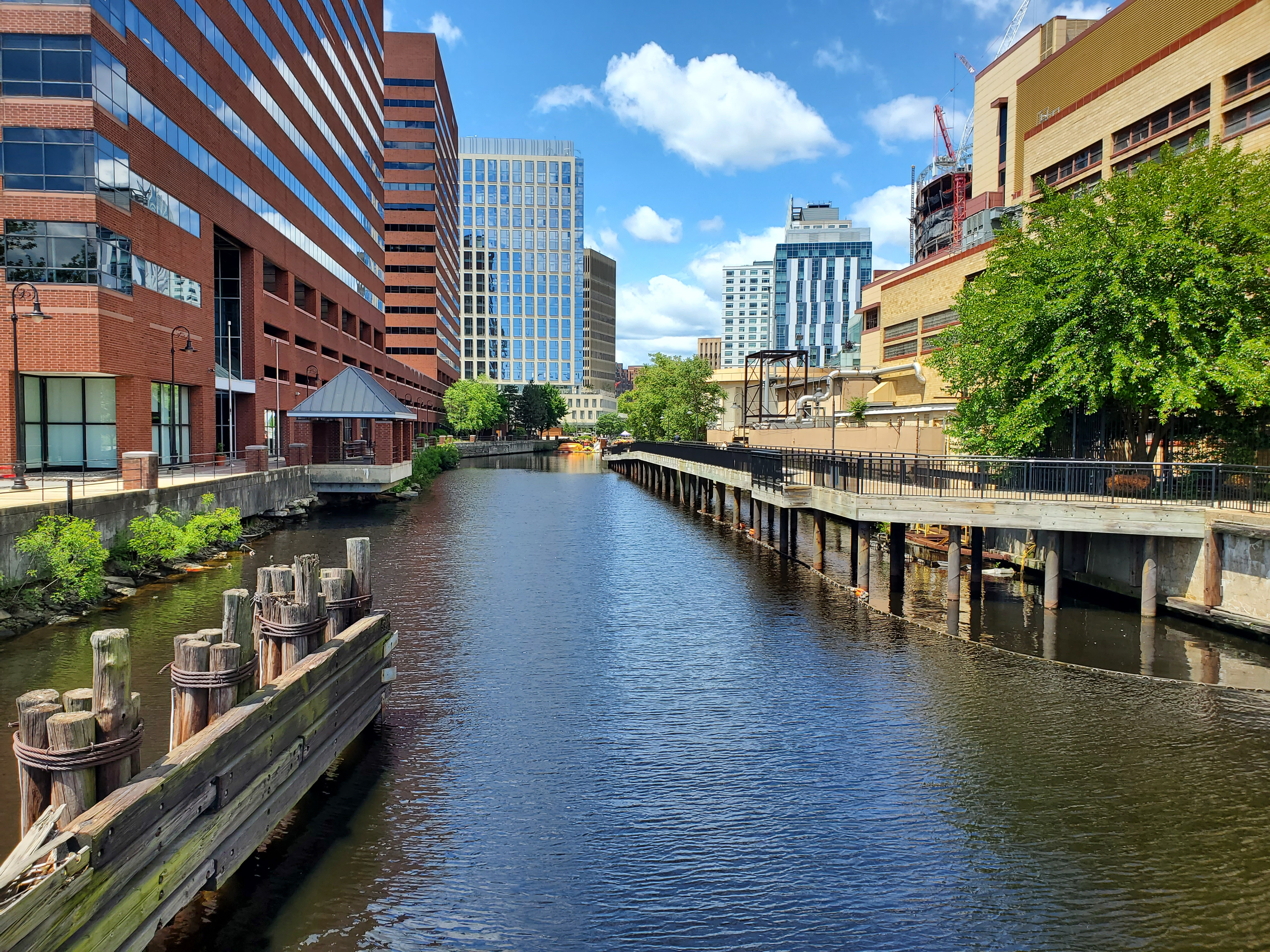
Broad Canal in 2025

Broad Canal is a short canal in East Cambridge, Massachusetts, previously larger and part of the now-vanished canal system that made Cambridge an active seaport.

The canal began in 1806 when Henry Hill, Rufus Davenport, and others laid out a canal system in the land and tidal flats along the Charles River. Broad Canal was dug before 1810, and 80 feet (24 m) wide from the low-water mark to Portland Street. In 1874 the lower part of the canal, between First and Third Streets, was 100 feet (30 m) wide. Connecting canals ran through much of today's East Cambridge.

No visible trace remains of that system, and extensive infills have removed all remnants of Cambridge's seaport docks and wharves. About 1,000 feet (300 m) of the canal still exists between the Charles River and Kendall Square.
