= Harry Potter: The Exhibition =

Traveling exhibition of costumes, props and artefacts of the Harry Potter films

Harry Potter: The Exhibition is a travelling exhibition based on the Harry Potter series of books and films, which features props, costumes, and other artefacts. The first iteration of the Exhibition ran from April 2009 to March 2020. A second iteration of the Exhibition premiered in early 2022.

== First iteration (2009-2020) ==
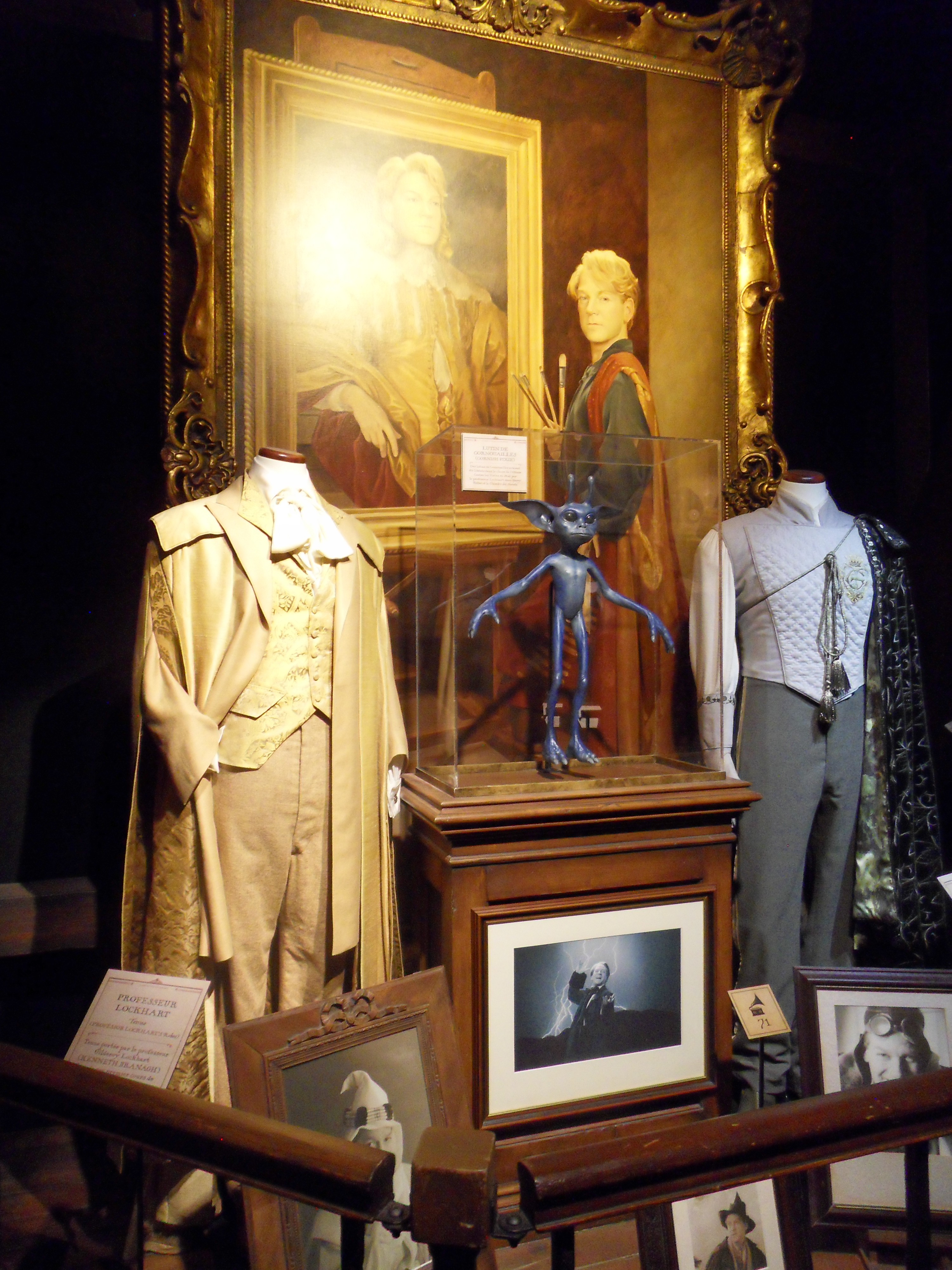
Items relating to Gilderoy Lockhart on display while the exhibition's first iteration was in Paris.

=== Development ===
Warner Bros. Consumer Products, a division of Warner Bros. Entertainment Inc. (the studio which produced the film series), created the exhibition in partnership with Exhibitgroup/Giltspur (which later merged with GES Exposition Services).

=== Tour ===
The exhibition originally opened in April 2009 at the Museum of Science and Industry in Chicago, Illinois, United States. Following its premiere, the exhibition was shown at various localities around the world. The final exhibition of this iteration was at the Pavilhão de Portugal, in Lisbon, Portugal, which ended in March 2020 (earlier than scheduled due to the COVID-19 pandemic).

=== Features ===
The exhibition featured props, costumes, and other artefacts from the creation of the Harry Potter film series. Among the items displayed were Harry Potter's wand and eyeglasses. Also featured were film sets, such the Great Hall and Gryffindor Common Room from the fictional school Hogwarts, which is a major setting in the series. Beginning in 2016, some artefacts from the Fantastic Beasts and Where to Find Them film series were also included.

== Second iteration (2022 - present) ==
=== Development ===
As of 2021, Warner Bros., in partnership with Imagine Exhibitions and EMC Presents, created a new iteration of the Exhibition. This new version still highlights the Harry Potter and Fantastic Beasts series of books and films, and also features stories from the expanded Wizarding World, including Harry Potter and the Cursed Child. Visitors are able to see authentic props and original costumes from the films and have the opportunity to engage with the exhibits.

=== Tour ===
The Franklin Institute in Philadelphia, Pennsylvania hosted the world premiere of the Exhibition in early 2022, which now tours globally.

Since 13 September 2024, the CambridgeSide mall near Boston, Massachusetts, USA has hosted the Exhibition. The exhibit features many authentic props and costumes from the Harry Potter films and the Broadway production. The exhibit also has interactive features and was created and developed by Warner Bros. Discovery Global.
