= Lechmere Square =

Major intersection in Cambridge, Massachusetts

Coordinates: 42°22′15″N 71°4′36″W

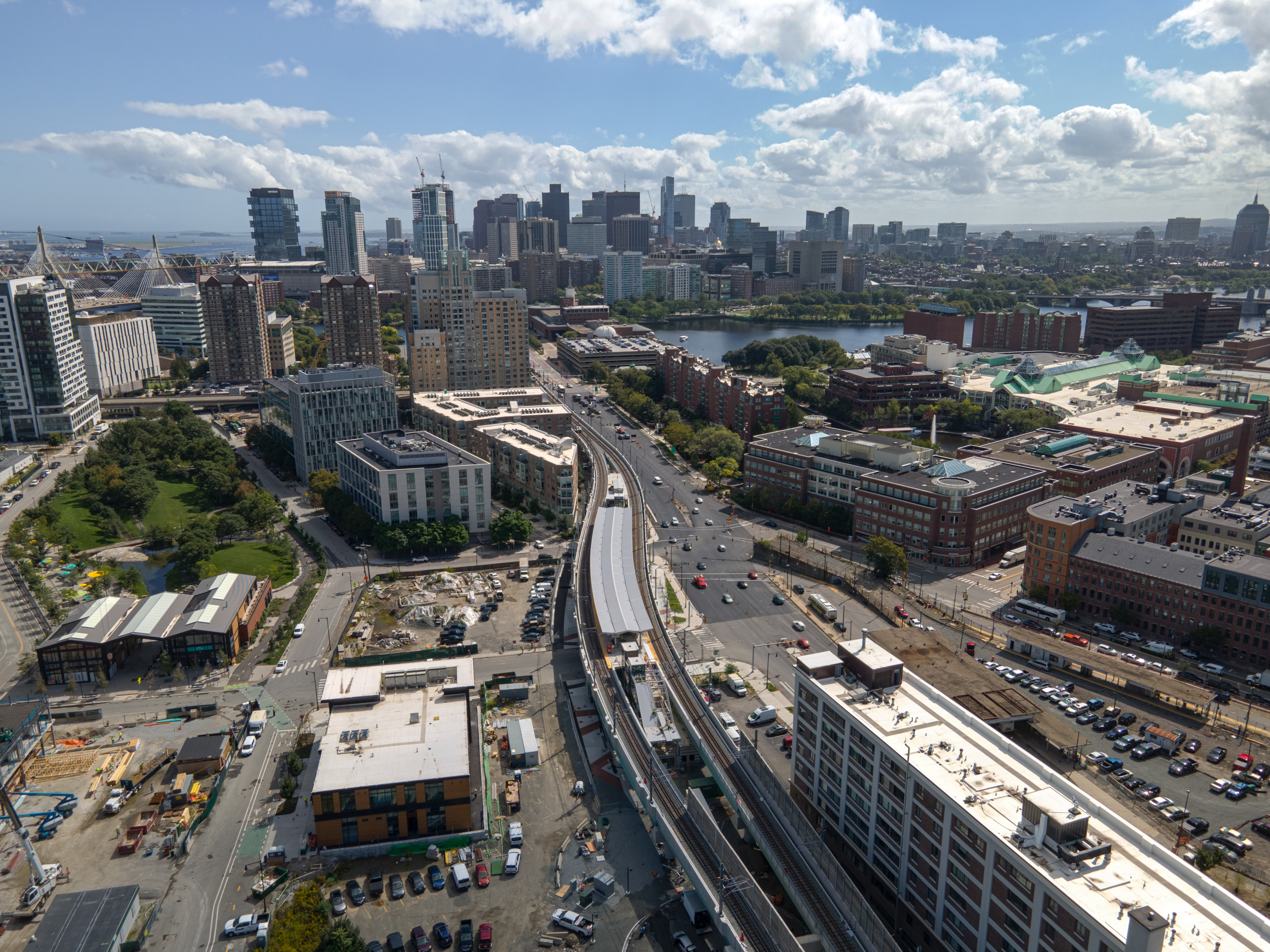
Aerial view of Lechmere Square in 2021, with the new Lechmere station under construction

Lechmere Square (/ˈliːtʃmɪr/ LEECH-meer) is located at the intersection of Cambridge Street and First Street in East Cambridge, Massachusetts. It was originally named for the Colonial-era landowner Richard Lechmere, a Loyalist who returned to England at the beginning of the American Revolution. His lands were later seized by the new American government. The shoreline is shown as "Lechmere's Point" on Revolutionary War maps, and was the landing point for British troops en route to the Battles of Lexington and Concord.

The area was developed by land speculator Andrew Craigie in the early 19th century. Later, a store was founded in the area and named for it. The Lechmere store expanded into a regional chain, which was closed in 1997 as then-parent company Montgomery Ward filed for Chapter 11 bankruptcy.

The area is now best known for the CambridgeSide mall, one of the few full-fledged interior shopping malls within the city limits of Boston and Cambridge, which is on the site of the original Lechmere store (and, when built, incorporated a newly built Lechmere Sales store as one of its anchor tenants). In years past, Lechmere Square was a manufacturing center producing candy, furniture, and caskets.

Lechmere Square and the surrounding East Cambridge are currently undergoing a revival of sorts. The area's factories have been or are being converted into office buildings and condominiums. Several large-scale development projects were begun in 2004 and 2005, and as a result East Cambridge and Lechmere Square have undergone a gentrification process similar to what has been seen in other areas of Cambridge.

Lechmere Square is served by Lechmere station of the Massachusetts Bay Transportation Authority (MBTA). The former surface-level station closed in May 2020 for construction of the Green Line Extension; a replacement elevated station opened on March 21, 2022.

The Charles River, Lechmere Canal, and Memorial Drive are nearby. Lechmere is also located close to the Museum of Science.
