= Immigration and Naturalization Service v. Elias-Zacarias =

- Supreme Court of the United States

Argued November 4, 1991 Decided January 22, 1992
- Full case name: Immigration and Naturalization Service, Petitioner v. Jairo Jonathan Elias-Zacarias
- Citations: 502 U.S. 478 (more) 112 S. Ct. 812; 117 L. Ed. 2d 38; 1992 U.S. LEXIS 550; 60 U.S.L.W. 4130; 92 Cal. Daily Op. Service 614; 92 Daily Journal DAR 983

Case history
- Prior: On writ of certiorari to the United States Court of Appeals for the Ninth Circuit

Holding
- A guerrilla organization's attempt to coerce a person into performing military service does not necessarily constitute "persecution on account of ... political opinion" under the Immigration and Nationality Act.

Court membership
- Chief Justice William Rehnquist Associate Justices Byron White · Harry Blackmun; John P. Stevens · Sandra Day O'Connor; Antonin Scalia · Anthony Kennedy; David Souter · Clarence Thomas

Case opinions
- Majority: Scalia, joined by Rehnquist, White, Kennedy, Souter, Thomas
- Dissent: Stevens, joined by Blackmun, O'Connor

Laws applied
- Immigration and Nationality Act, 8 U.S.C. § 1101(a)(42)

Immigration and Naturalization Service v. Elias-Zacarias, 502 U.S. 478 (1992), is a case in which the United States Supreme Court ruled that a Guatemalan man seeking asylum in the United States of America as a result of forced conscription in a guerrilla army did not establish persecution on account of political opinion, a legal requirement for asylum.

== Facts ==
In July 1987, Jairo Jonathan Elias-Zacarias was arrested for illegally entering the United States without inspection. In deportation proceedings, he testified that six months before he was arrested, in his native Guatemala, two armed, uniformed guerrillas covering their faces with handkerchiefs entered his home. The armed guerrillas demanded that he and his parents join the rebellion, but they all refused. Elias-Zacarias did not want to join the guerrillas because they were against the government, and he was afraid the government would retaliate against him if he joined the guerrillas. Elias-Zacarias left Guatemala in March, 1987, because he was afraid the guerrillas would return.

After an immigration judge denied his application for asylum, and the Board of Immigration Appeals denied an appeal, he submitted new evidence saying that after he had left Guatemala, the guerrillas had returned to his home twice more seeking to recruit him. The BIA rejected the new evidence, saying it would not change the fact that he was not legally eligible for asylum. He appealed this denial to the Ninth Circuit Court of Appeals, which concluded that Elias-Zacarias had established a well founded fear of persecution–of being conscripted into the guerrilla army in Guatemala. The INS asked the Supreme Court to review the Ninth Circuit's decision.

== Opinion of the Court ==
Under the Immigration and Nationality Act, 8 U.S.C. § 1101(a)(42), any alien who is "unable or unwilling to return to his home country because of persecution or a well-founded fear of persecution on account of race, religion, nationality, membership in a particular social group, or political opinion" is eligible for asylum in the United States. The Court emphasized that, when a refugee applies for asylum on account of political opinion, the refugee must actually be expressing a political opinion, and it is the political opinion of the refugee that is important, not that of his persecutors. Because neither of these applied to Elias-Zacarias, the Court had to ultimately deny his application for asylum.

There were many reasons apparent to the Court why a person might not want to join a guerrilla organization, and not all of them were related to a political opinion. He might be afraid of combat, he might want to remain with his family and friends, he might wish to "earn a better living in civilian life." None of these explanations was germane to any political opinion Elias-Zacarias might have been expressing.

And as for the political motives of the guerrillas, the Court found these to be beside the point. The statute, after all, made a refugee eligible for asylum only if the persecution he experienced was "on account of political opinion." The Court thought that the "ordinary meaning" of these words referred to the victim's political opinion, not the persecutor's. "If a Nazi regime persecutes Jews, it is not, within the ordinary meaning of language, engaging in persecution on account of political opinion; and if a fundamentalist Moslem regime persecutes democrats, it is not engaging in persecution on account of religion. Thus, the mere existence of a generalized 'political' motive underlying the guerrillas' forced recruitment is inadequate to establish... the proposition that Elias-Zacarias fears persecution on account of political opinion."

Further, even if the Court were to accept the proposition that not taking a political opinion was in itself a political opinion, Elias-Zacarias had to establish that he feared the guerrillas would persecute him because of that political opinion. The crucial deficiency on this score was that there was no evidence in the record of what the guerrillas' motives were.

=== Justice Stevens' dissent ===
Justice Stevens, writing for himself and two other dissenting Justices, criticized the majority's holding for being too harsh. After all, if he had prevailed, he would simply have been eligible for asylum; the ultimate decision to grant him that status still rested with the United States Attorney General. In his view, the majority's decision overlooked this critical fact.

The discretion that rests with the Attorney General was Stevens's point of departure for two other criticisms. First, "a political opinion can be expressed negatively as well as affirmatively." Choosing not to take sides in a political dispute is itself a political choice, one that the asylum laws should protect just as much as an affirmative political statement. Because the Attorney General ultimately retains discretion to grant or deny an application for asylum, Stevens found it to be imprudent to take away from him or her the discretion to extend that protection to an equally deserving class of refugees. Second, the guerrillas' threat to kill Elias-Zacarias for refusing to join their cause was indisputably "on account of" the political opinion to remain neutral with respect to their fight against the government.

== Aftermath ==
It was assumed following the case that Elias-Zacarias would be deported from the United States. However, Elias-Zacarias won the visa lottery and became a legal resident. In 2006, he became a U.S. citizen.
