= Judges (Protection) Act, 1985 =

Parliament of India
- Long title: An Act for securing additional protection for Judges and others acting Judicially and for matters connected therewith.
- Territorial extent: India
- Enacted by: Parliament of India
- Enacted: 6th September, 1985
- Status: In force

The Judges (Protection) Act, 1985 is an act of the Parliament of India which was enacted in order to provide absolute judicial immunity to judges and others acting in a judicial capacity.

== Provisions ==
Section 2 of the act defines the meaning of "Judge" which along with the usual definition, include:

(a) who is empowered by law to give in any legal proceeding a definitive judgment, or a judgment which, if not appealed against, would be definitive, or a judgment which, if confirmed by some other authority, would be definitive; or
(b) who is one of a body of persons which body of persons is empowered by law to give such a judgment as is referred to in clause (a).

— Section 2 of Judges (Protection) Act, 1985

Section 3(1) provides protection to judges by stating:

(1) Notwithstanding anything contained in any other law for the time being in force and subject to the provisions of sub-section (2), no court shall entertain or continue any civil or criminal proceeding against any person who is or was a Judge for any act, thing or word committed, done or spoken by him when, or in the course of, acting or purporting to act in the discharge of his official or judicial duty or function.

— Section 3(1) of Judges (Protection) Act, 1985.

But this does not prevent the Central Government, the State Government, the Supreme Court of India or any High Court or any other authority under any law in force to take such action (whether by way of civil, criminal, or departmental proceedings or otherwise) against any person who is or was a judge.
