= Judicial immunity =

Immunity of judges from the law

Judicial immunity is a form of sovereign immunity, which protects judges and others employed by the judiciary from liability resulting from their judicial actions. It is intended to ensure that judges can make decisions free from improper influence exercised on them, contributing to the impartiality of the judiciary and the rule of law. In modern times, the main purpose of "judicial immunity [is to shield] judges from the suits of ordinary people", primarily litigants who may be dissatisfied with the outcome of a case decided by the judge. In some countries judges are immune to lawsuits.

== Alternatives ==
In some countries absolute immunity is considered contrary to the rule of law and state liability.

Depending on the jurisdiction, judges may be criminally charged for some forms of courtroom behavior. The method by which judges are removed varies by the judicial system in question; they include removal by other judges on the same or a higher court (in the United States, a judicial council), by a recall election, by the next regular election, or following impeachment by a legislature. In some countries judges have been imprisoned, for example judges in the Kids for cash scandal.

To increase public trust in the judiciary and judicial accountability to voters judicial reforms have been proposed, including improving nonpartisanship and increasing judicial liability for judicial wrongs.

== History ==
Judicial immunity developed gradually over time, evolving into its current-day position. The early origins of the doctrine may be, according to some sources, traced to the preservation of judicial independence from the political forces of the day, although today judicial independence is regarded as a separate principle, and immunity mainly justified from the judge's distance and independence from the parties to a case.

Whilst scholars disagree on the exact history of judicial immunity at common law, most generally agree that its key purposes include preserving the impartiality of the judge, and avoiding attacks on judicial officers as an alternative or a bypass to appeals.

== By country ==
=== India ===
Judges enjoy absolute immunity from prosecution for any act, thing or word committed, done or spoken by them when, or in the course of, acting or purporting to act in the discharge of their official or judicial duty or function, under section 3(1) of the Judges (Protection) Act, 1985. But it does not prevent Central Government or the State Government or the Supreme Court of India or any High Court or any other authority under any law for the time being in force to take such action (whether by way of civil, criminal, or departmental proceedings or otherwise) against any person who is or was a Judge.

=== United Kingdom ===
In the United Kingdom, tribunals are considered judicial in nature and so judicial immunity applies to them at common law. This was accepted by the Employment Appeal Tribunal and subsequently the Court of Appeal of England and Wales in respect of police misconduct hearings constituted under the Police (Discipline) Regulations 1985 (since superseded by the Police (Conduct) Regulations 2008) in Heath v Commissioner of Police for the Metropolis. However, in P v Commissioner of Police of the Metropolis, in which a police officer (an officer of the Crown, but under the Equality Act 2010 treated as an employee in employment discrimination cases) sought review of her dismissal as constituting disability discrimination due to post-traumatic stress disorder, the Supreme Court ruled that the Employment Equality Framework Directive provided directly applicable rights of access to justice in cases of employment discrimination, which, given the supremacy of EU law, overrode the common law rule of judicial immunity.

=== United States ===
The United States, upon independence, inherited from England a common-law heritage of judicial immunity, the Supreme Court even holding that "[f]ew doctrines were more solidly established at common law than the immunity of judges from liability for damages for acts committed within their judicial jurisdiction". Notably, in Bradley v. Fisher, 80 US (13 Wall.) 335, the Supreme Court, referring in dicta to contemporary precedent in England, held that an action ought not to be entertained against a judge for their judicial acts even where allegedly done "maliciously and corruptly", at 349. The breadth of this view, however is often disputed.

In the United States, judicial immunity is among a handful of forms of absolute immunity, along with prosecutorial immunity, legislative immunity, and witness immunity. The U.S. Supreme Court has characterized judicial immunity as providing "the maximum ability [of judges] to deal fearlessly and impartially with the public". The justification is as follows: because of the likelihood of innocent individuals being convicted in a court of law under false claims, the "burden" of being subjected to a court of law (a trial) would "dampen" the judges "enthusiasm" or "passion". Opponents of judicial immunity argue that this doctrine is not adequately justified. For example, judges could be shielded from any personal capacity liability, and still be subject to official capacity liability so that they may be held accountable for their injurious acts – thus "balancing" the "evil" to better protect the fundamental rights of victims.

Judicial immunity does not protect judges from suits stemming from administrative decisions made while off the bench, like hiring and firing decisions. But immunity generally does extend to all judicial decisions in which the judge has proper jurisdiction, even if a decision is made with "corrupt or malicious intent". By way of counterexample: in 1997 West Virginia Judge Troisi became so irritated with a rude defendant, he stepped down from the bench, took off his robe, and bit the defendant on the nose. He pleaded no contest to state charges but was acquitted of federal charges of violating the defendant's civil rights. He spent five days in jail and was put on probation.

Because the immunity is attached to the judicial nature of the acts, not the official title of the officeholder, judicial immunity also applies to administrative hearings, although in some situations, only qualified immunity applies. In determining whether absolute or qualified immunity applies, the U.S. Supreme Court has identified the following factors, according to the Shriver Center's Federal Practice Manual for Legal Aid Attorneys:

(a) The need to assure that the individual can perform his functions without harassment or intimidation; (b) the presence of safeguards that reduce the need for private damages actions as a means of controlling unconstitutional conduct; (c) insulation from political influence; (d) the importance of precedent; (e) the adversary nature of the process; and (f) the correctability of error on appeal.

==== Significant cases ====
The following are a few significant or illustrative cases on judicial immunity in the United States:

===== Stump v. Sparkman (1978) =====
One of the leading decisions on judicial immunity is Stump v. Sparkman. In 1971, Judge Harold D. Stump granted a mother's petition to have a tubal ligation performed on her 15-year-old daughter, whom the mother alleged was "somewhat retarded". The daughter was told that the surgery was to remove her appendix. In 1975 the daughter, going by her then-married name of Linda Sparkman, learned that she had been sterilized. She sued the judge. The U.S. Supreme Court ruled that the judge could not be sued, because the decision was made in the course of their duties. In that regard, it was irrelevant that the judge's decision may have been contrary to law and morally reprehensible.

===== Harris v. Harvey (1979) =====
One significant case where a judge was sued and did not receive immunity is Harris v. Harvey. Sylvester Harris, an African-American police lieutenant in Racine, Wisconsin, was attacked in a variety of ways by Judge Richard G. Harvey. Harris sued Harvey because of (a) comments Harvey made to the news media, (b) threatening letters Harvey wrote to city and county officials who attempted to defend Harris, and (c) parties Harvey held for ranking state officials during which he attempted to get Harris removed from law enforcement. The jury concluded that Harvey was not eligible for judicial immunity for these actions, as such acts were not part of the judge's normal duties (i.e. they were "outside his jurisdiction"). The jury awarded Harris $260,000 in damages. Another judge later added $7,500 in legal fees. The United States Court of Appeals for the Seventh Circuit concurred with the jury's decision. Judge Harvey petitioned the Seventh Circuit court for an en banc rehearing, and petitioned to the Supreme Court, both of which were denied. Harris v. Harvey is the first case in the United States where a sitting court judge has been sued and lost in a civil action; it is a binding precedent in the Seventh Circuit and is persuasive authority in the other circuits.

===== Supreme Court of Virginia v. Consumers Union (1980) =====
In Supreme Court of Virginia v. Consumers Union (1980), the U.S. Supreme Court ruled that the Supreme Court of Virginia did not have immunity from being enjoined in its enforcement capacity where state law gave the court independent authority to initiate certain proceedings against attorneys. Consumers Union was hindered in compiling an attorney directory because many attorneys declined to provide information for fear of violating regulations promulgated by the Supreme Court of Virginia. Consumers Union filed a lawsuit in federal court against the Supreme Court of Virginia and others, under 42 U.S.C. § 1983, seeking to have the regulation declared unconstitutional and to enjoin the defendants from enforcing it. The U.S. Supreme Court affirmed the Supreme Court of Virginia's possession of legislative immunity in some cases, however.

===== Mireles v. Waco (1991) =====
In the case of Mireles v. Waco (1991), when a defense lawyer failed to appear for a scheduled hearing, the judge not only issued a bench warrant for his arrest, but instructed the police sent to arrest him to "rough him up a little" to teach him not to skip court dates. Although this was entirely unprofessional and possibly criminal, the judge was held, by the Supreme Court, to have absolute immunity from a lawsuit arising from the resulting beating, because the misbehavior occurred entirely within his activities as a judge presiding over a court.

== See also ==
- Judicial misconduct
- Diminished responsibility
  - Diminished capacity in United States law
- Qualified immunity
