= Immigration and Naturalization Service v. Doherty =

- Supreme Court of the United States

Argued October 16, 1991 Decided January 15, 1992
- Full case name: Immigration and Naturalization Service, Petitioner v. Joseph Patrick Doherty
- Citations: 502 U.S. 314 (more) 112 S. Ct. 719; 116 L. Ed. 2d 823; 1992 U.S. LEXIS 376; 60 U.S.L.W. 4085; 92 Cal. Daily Op. Service 470; 92 Daily Journal DAR 703

Case history
- Prior: Deportee's deportation was suspended, and the INS appealed for a determination by the Attorney General, who ordered deportation. Meanwhile, deportee sought to reopen deportation proceedings, and permission was granted, but the INS appealed this permission to the Attorney General as well. The Attorney General personally denied the motion to reopen. The Second Circuit affirmed the order of deportation but reversed the denial of the motion to reopen, 908 F.2d 1108 (2d Cir. 1990). Cert. granted, 498 U.S. 1081 (1991).

Holding
- The Attorney General has broad discretion to regulate the reopening of adjudicative proceedings before the immigration department.

Court membership
- Chief Justice William Rehnquist Associate Justices Byron White · Harry Blackmun; John P. Stevens · Sandra Day O'Connor; Antonin Scalia · Anthony Kennedy; David Souter · Clarence Thomas

Case opinions
- Majority: Rehnquist (Part I), joined by White, Blackmun, O'Connor, Kennedy
- Plurality: Rehnquist (Part II), joined by White, Blackmun, O'Connor
- Plurality: Rehnquist (Part III), joined by Kennedy
- Concur/dissent: Scalia, joined by Stevens, Souter
- Thomas took no part in the consideration or decision of the case.

Laws applied
- 8 C.F.R. § 3.2

Immigration and Naturalization Service v. Doherty, 502 U.S. 314 (1992), was a United States Supreme Court case which confirmed that the Attorney General of the United States has broad discretion to reopen deportation (now called "removal") proceedings, as well as other adjudications heard before immigration courts.

== Background ==
John Patrick Doherty was a citizen of Northern Ireland, Ireland, and the United Kingdom. In May 1980, Doherty and fellow members of the Irish Republican Army ambushed a car containing members of the British army, killing one of them. Doherty was tried for murder in Northern Ireland, but escaped from the maximum security prison where he was being held during the trial. He was convicted in absentia and sentenced to life in prison. After escaping from prison, however, Doherty entered the United States illegally in 1982. He was discovered in June 1983, and deportation proceedings were initiated. During these proceedings, Doherty applied for asylum and withholding of deportation. The United Kingdom asked the United States to extradite Doherty, but a federal judge ruled that he was not extraditable because his crimes were considered political offenses for which extradition was not required.

At the conclusion of the extradition proceedings, the deportation proceedings resumed. Doherty conceded deportability and designated Ireland as the country to which he should be deported. He then withdrew his applications for asylum and withholding of deportation. The INS challenged Doherty's selection of Ireland as his country of deportation, but the Board of Immigration Appeals rejected the selection as unsupported by clear evidence. The INS then appealed this determination to the Attorney General. Ultimately, Attorney General Edwin Meese reversed the BIA and ordered Doherty deported to the United Kingdom.

By this time, the Irish Extradition Act had been passed, under which criminals in Ireland would face trial in the United Kingdom. Doherty thus sought to reopen the deportation proceedings in order to present his claims for asylum and withholding of deportation. He asserted that under the Irish Extradition Act, the British would seek to extradite him to the United Kingdom from Ireland if he should return there, and consequently he feared persecution in the United Kingdom. The BIA granted Doherty's motion to reopen, and the INS again appealed to the Attorney General. Attorney General Richard Thornburgh found three grounds for denying the motion to reopen.

The Second Circuit affirmed Meese's order of deportation but reversed Thornburgh's order denying Doherty's motion to reopen. It believed that the Irish Extradition Act, coupled with Meese's denial of his designation of Ireland as his country of deportation (itself an unusual act) was new evidence that entitled Doherty to reopening. It also ruled that following INS v. Abudu, 485 U.S. 94 (1988), the Attorney General lacked discretion to deny reopening once an alien had established a prima facie case for withholding of deportation. Finally, the Second Circuit ordered the BIA to reevaluate Doherty's claim for asylum in light of the "foreign policy concerns" inherent in deporting a member of the IRA to Ireland.

== Opinion of the Court ==
When Attorney General Thornburgh denied Doherty's motion to reopen, he offered three separate grounds for doing so. First, Thornburgh concluded that Doherty did not present new evidence that warranted reopening. Second, he concluded that Doherty had waived his claims to asylum and withholding of deportation when he abandoned those claims during the original deportation proceedings. Third, he concluded that Doherty was ineligible for withholding of deportation and for asylum because he had committed "serious nonpolitical crimes" in Northern Ireland.

Motions to reopen are disfavored, particularly in deportation proceedings, because they can upset the finality of determinations made and simply work to the advantage of deportable aliens who wish nevertheless to remain in the United States. After Abudu, courts review denials of motions to reopen for abuse of discretion. A majority of the Court concluded that Thornburgh had not abused his discretion in denying Doherty's motion for any one of the three reasons he gave.

== See also ==
- List of United States Supreme Court cases, volume 502
- List of United States Supreme Court cases
- Lists of United States Supreme Court cases by volume
- List of United States Supreme Court cases by the Rehnquist Court
