= Lechmere Canal =

Coordinates: 42°22′8″N 71°4′28″W

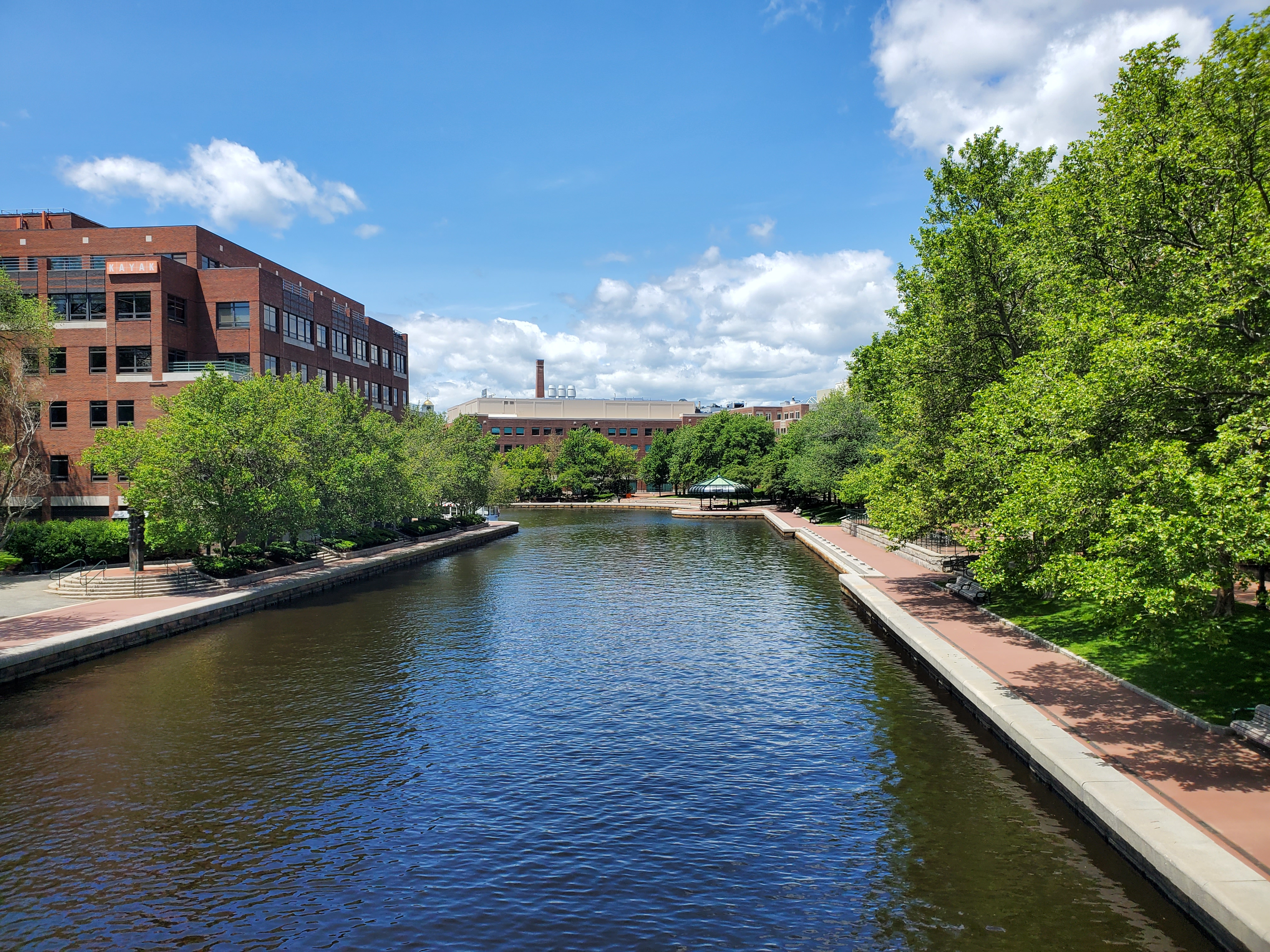
Lechmere Canal in 2025

Lechmere Canal is a short canal in East Cambridge, Massachusetts. It opens onto the Charles River and used to be an active port for Boston Harbor and the Atlantic Ocean.

== History ==
The canal was constructed in 1895, essentially by walling off an existing portion of the Charles around which was laid landfill. The area was an active seaport until the Charles River Dam Bridge was interposed between it and Boston Harbor in 1910.

The canal's original right of way appears to have been granted by several deeds in 1834, as conveyed by the Proprietors of Canal Bridge, the predecessor of the Charles River Dam Bridge. Landing near Water Street, this was the second bridge to connect eastern Cambridge to western Boston, after the West Boston Bridge. In this area on the south side of what is now Monsignor O'Brien Highway was waterfront property. The deeds conveyed canal passage as well as "the privilege of a dock 100 feet in width on the south-westerly side of the aforegranted premises; said dock to be kept open for ever for the common use and benefit of the owners and occupants of the land or wharves on either side and head thereof." Its south spur seems to have been authorized by the Harbor Commissioners in 1874. This extension was allowed to be 120 feet wide and some 900 feet long, and would be created in the midst of landfill as the harbor was filled. After landfilling it would parallel First Street from the current terminus, passing approximately where the main hall of the Cambridgeside Galleria is now, extending to Bent Street.

== Today ==
Today the canal has been incorporated into the East Cambridge Embankment, and serves as a scenic accent to the surrounding neighborhood and park. It is northwest of the Museum of Science near Lechmere Square. It is used primarily by the Charles River Boat Company, which operates pleasure trips from a mooring in front of the Galleria. Private boats can also use the moorings there for mall access.
