= Zatko v. California =

- Supreme Court of the United States

Decided November 4, 1991
- Full case name: Zatko v. California
- Citations: 502 U.S. 16 (more)

Holding
- A repeat petitioner who regularly files frivolous claims using Supreme Court's in forma pauperis filing fee exception must pay full price to apply for a writ of certiorari.

Court membership
- Chief Justice William Rehnquist Associate Justices Byron White · Harry Blackmun; John P. Stevens · Sandra Day O'Connor; Antonin Scalia · Anthony Kennedy; David Souter · Clarence Thomas

Case opinions
- Per curiam
- Dissent: Stevens, joined by Blackmun

Laws applied
- Rules of the Supreme Court 39

Zatko v. California, 502 U.S. 16 (1991), was a United States Supreme Court case in which the Court held that a repeat petitioner who regularly files frivolous claims using the Supreme Court's in forma pauperis filing fee exception must pay full price to apply for a writ of certiorari.

== Description ==
Applying for a writ of certiorari from the United States Supreme Court costs $300. However, in the interest of access, a petitioner may attest that they are too poor to afford the fee, and it will be waived. Soon before Zatko, and over the dissent of three justices, the Court updated its rules to give them more control over this process. In this case, for the first time in its history, the Supreme Court denied such a request because the two petitioners had filed many cases the justices deemed frivolous.

In dissent, Stevens noted that the court routinely denied applications from indigent petitioners without any analysis of the frivolity of their claims, even after the rule change. He thought that singling out these petitioners because they filed many claims was bad policy: "Although the Court may have intended to send a message about the need for the orderly administration of justice and respect for the judicial process, the message that it actually conveys is that the Court does not have an overriding concern about equal access to justice for both the rich and the poor."

== Later developments ==
The court later denied applications to proceed in forma pauperis over Steven's dissent in Martin v. District of Columbia Court of Appeals, Attwood v. Singletary, Jones v. ABC-TV, and Shieh v. Kakita.

== See also ==
- Demos v. Storrie
