= Lechmere, Inc. v. NLRB =

Lechmere, Inc. v. National Labor Relations Board
- Supreme Court of the United States

Argued November 12, 1991 Decided January 27, 1992
- Full case name: Lechmere, Inc. v. National Labor Relations Board
- Citations: 502 U.S. 527 (more) 112 S. Ct. 841; 117 L. Ed. 2d 79; 1992 U.S. LEXIS 555; 60 U.S.L.W. 4145; 120 Lab. Cas. (CCH) ¶ 11,066; 139 L.R.R.M. 2225; 92 Cal. Daily Op. Service 743; 92 Daily Journal DAR 1235

Case history
- Prior: On appeal from the Court of Appeals for the First Circuit, 914 F.2d 313 (1st Cir. 1990); cert. granted, 499 U.S. 918 (1991).

Holding
- Store owner did not commit an unfair labor practice under § 8(a)(1) of National Labor Relations Act by barring nonemployee union organizers from parking lot.

Court membership
- Chief Justice William Rehnquist Associate Justices Byron White · Harry Blackmun; John P. Stevens · Sandra Day O'Connor; Antonin Scalia · Anthony Kennedy; David Souter · Clarence Thomas

Case opinions
- Majority: Thomas, joined by Rehnquist, O'Connor, Scalia, Kennedy, Souter
- Dissent: White, joined by Blackmun
- Dissent: Stevens

Laws applied
- National Labor Relations Act, 29 U.S.C. § 157

Lechmere, Inc. v. National Labor Relations Board, 502 U.S. 527 (1992), is a US labor law case of the Supreme Court of the United States on union rights and private property rights. It forbids nonemployee union organizers from soliciting support on private property unless no reasonable alternatives exist.

== Background ==
Lechmere, Inc. owned a retail store in a shopping plaza in Newington, Connecticut, a metropolitan area near Hartford, and it also was part owner of the plaza's parking lot. Employees of Lechmere, Inc. who drove to work used the lot to park their vehicles during their shifts. The parking lot was separated from a public highway by a strip of land that was almost entirely public property. Local union organizers, not employees of Lechmere, Inc., attempted to organize Lechmere employees by placing promotional handbills on the windshields of cars parked in the employee area of the lot. Lechmere then denied the organizers access to the lot. This act caused the organizers instead to distribute their handbills from the aforementioned strip of public land between the lot and the highway.

Local 919 of the United Food and Commercial Workers filed an unfair labor practice charge to the NLRB (the National Labor Relations Board), claiming that Lechmere had violated §7 of the NLRA (the National Labor Relations Act) by barring them access to the parking lot. The applicable language of the law cited was the guarantee of the NLRA that employees have "the right to self-organization, to form, join, or assist labor organizations" (§7) and that it is an unfair labor practice for an employer "to interfere with, restrain, or coerce employees" in exercising their §7 rights. The NLRB affirmed the union's grievance, and the Court of Appeals enforced the NLRB's decision.

== Opinion of the Court ==
The Supreme Court reversed the lower court's decision based on three primary faults observed with the complaint:

- The NLRA "confers rights only on employees, not on unions or their nonemployee organizers." They reasoned that the NLRA guarantees that employees would be free to organize if they so chose, but the employer is not obligated to allow nonemployee union representatives access to their private property.
- §7 of the NLRA does not apply to nonemployee union organizers unless "the inaccessibility of employees makes ineffective the reasonable attempts by nonemployees to communicate with them through the usual channels." The Court reasoned it was improper to even begin a balancing test and private property rights unless "reasonable access to employees is infeasible."
- The union failed in demonstrating that there were any "unique obstacles" that prevented reasonable union access to the employees. The employees did not live in the shopping plaza and so they were not beyond the union's reach, and the Court further reasoned that the mere size of the city itself did not render the employees "inaccessible." The Court cited the fact that the union had been able to contact at least 20 employees directly regarding the organization.

The opinion of the Court was delivered by Justice Thomas, who was joined by Chief Justice Rehnquist and Justices O'Connor, Scalia, Kennedy and Souter. Justice White filed a dissenting opinion, joined by Justice Blackmun. Justice Stevens filed a separate dissenting opinion.

== Significance ==
After the decision, the Court of Appeals remanded the case to the NLRB to consider whether the Lechmere Company had violated Section 8(a)(1) by directing the non-employee union organizers to leave the public grassy area. The NLRB reaffirmed its previous ruling, holding that "the Supreme Court's vindication of the [employer's] private-property rights, if anything, elevates the gravity of [the employer's] attempt to bar union access to public property."

== See also ==
- US labor law
- List of United States Supreme Court cases, volume 502
- List of United States Supreme Court cases
- Lists of United States Supreme Court cases by volume
- List of United States Supreme Court cases by the Rehnquist Court
