= Lechmere Point Corporation Houses =

Historic house in Massachusetts, United States

- U.S. National Register of Historic Places
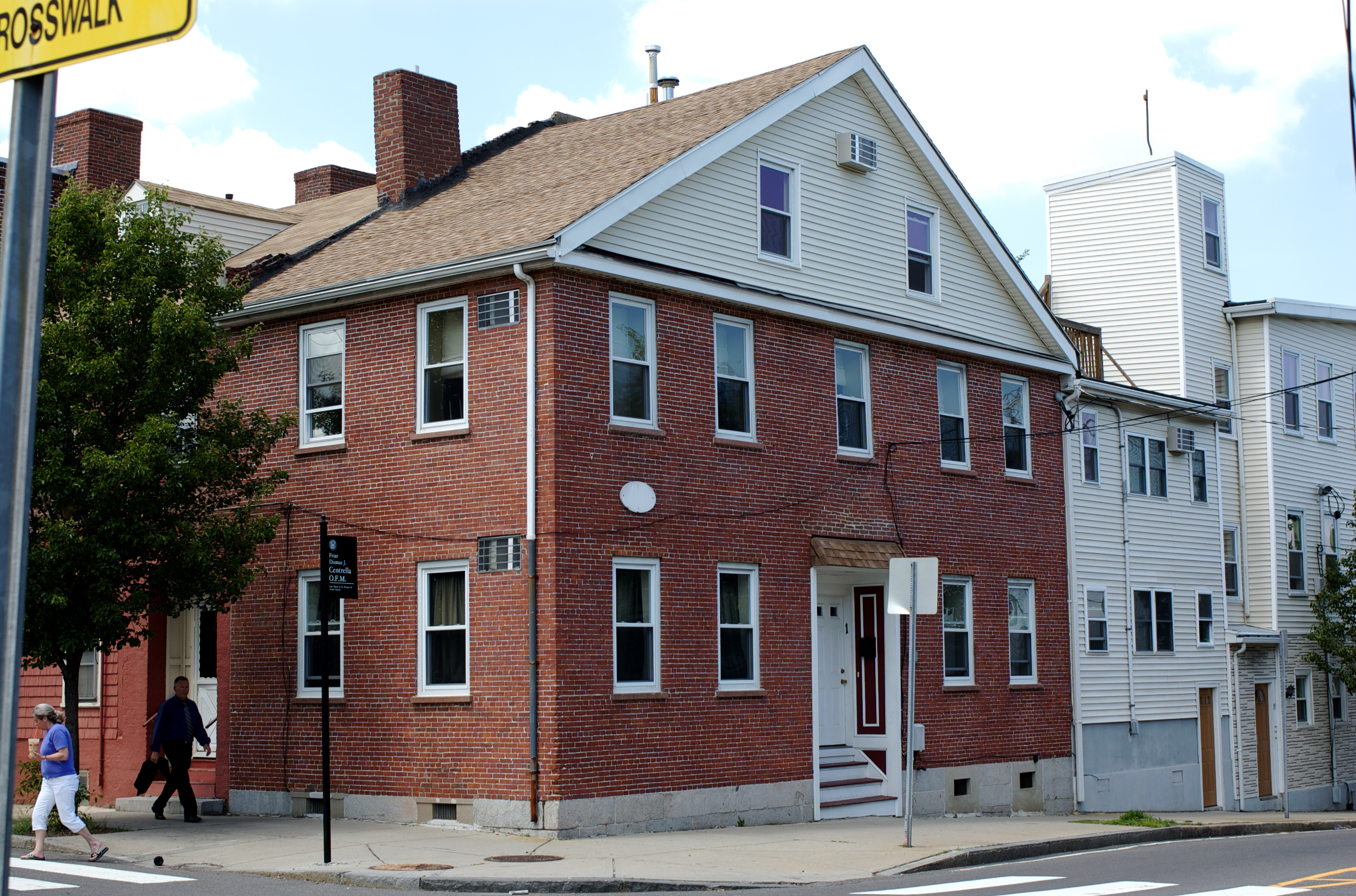
- 47 Gore Street (on the left) and 25 3rd Street (on the right)

- Location within Massachusetts Location within the United States
- Location: Cambridge, Massachusetts
- Coordinates: 42°22′18″N 71°4′49″W
- Built: 1821
- Architectural style: Federal
- MPS: Cambridge MRA
- NRHP reference No.: 82001957
- Added to NRHP: April 13, 1982

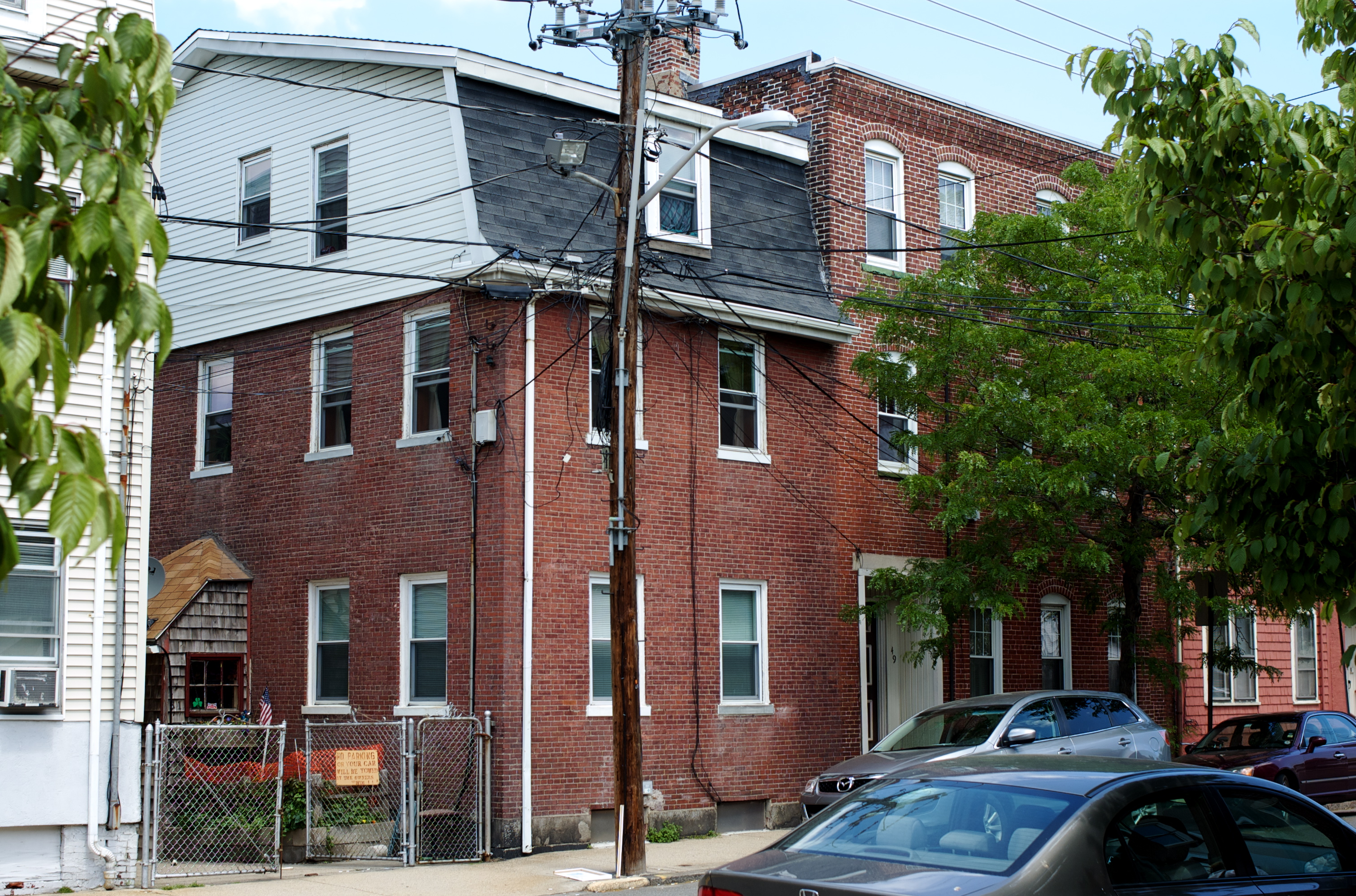
49 Gore Street

The Lechmere Point Corporation Houses is a historic apartment rowhouse at 45–51 Gore St. and 25 3rd Street in Cambridge, Massachusetts. Built sometime before 1821, this 2 1/2-story brick-and-wood structure is the only surviving building to be built by the Lechmere Point Corporation, which developed East Cambridge in the early decades of the 19th century. The house was owned for a time by lawyer and politician Christopher Gore, a principal of the corporation who also speculated in area real estate. Two of the buildings (25 3rd Street and 45 Gore Street) have retained their original gable roofs, while 49 Gore Street has been raised to a full three stories and given arched windows, and 51 Gore Street has had a mansard roof added.

The houses were listed on the National Register of Historic Places in 1982.

== See also ==
- National Register of Historic Places listings in Cambridge, Massachusetts
