= Lechmere (surname) =

Lechmere is a surname. Notable people with the surname include:

- Sir Anthony Lechmere, 1st Baronet (1766–1849)
- Sir Edmund Lechmere, 3rd Baronet (1826–1894)
- Anthony Lechmere (MP) (1674–1720), English Member of Parliament.
- Charles Allen Lechmere (1849–1920), English meat cart driver suspected of being Jack the Ripper
- Edmund Lechmere (MP for Worcestershire) (1710–1805), MP for Worcestershire
- Edmund Lechmere (MP for Worcester) (1747–1798), MP for Worcester (son of the above)
- Sir Edmund Lechmere, 3rd Baronet (1826–1894), Conservative MP
- Kate Lechmere (1887–1976), British cubist painter
- Nicholas Lechmere (priest) (1700/1–1770), English Archdeacon of Winchester
- Nicholas Lechmere (politician, died 1701) (1613–1701), English MP and judge
- Nicholas Lechmere, 1st Baron Lechmere (1675–1727), MP, Solicitor-General and Attorney General
- Nicholas Lechmere, from 1784 Nicholas Lechmere Charlton, (1733–1807), MP for Worcester (called until 1784)
- Nicholas Lechmere (colonel) (1749–1782), British Loyalist commander during the American Revolutionary War
- William Lechmere (1752–1815), officer in the Royal Navy

== See also ==
- Edmund Lechmere Charlton (1789–1845), British politician
- Lechmere Guppy (1836–1916), British-born naturalist, namesake of the guppy fish
- Lechmere Thomas (1897–1981), senior British Army officer
- Lechmere baronets
