= CambridgeSide =

Shopping mall in Cambridge, Massachusetts, United States

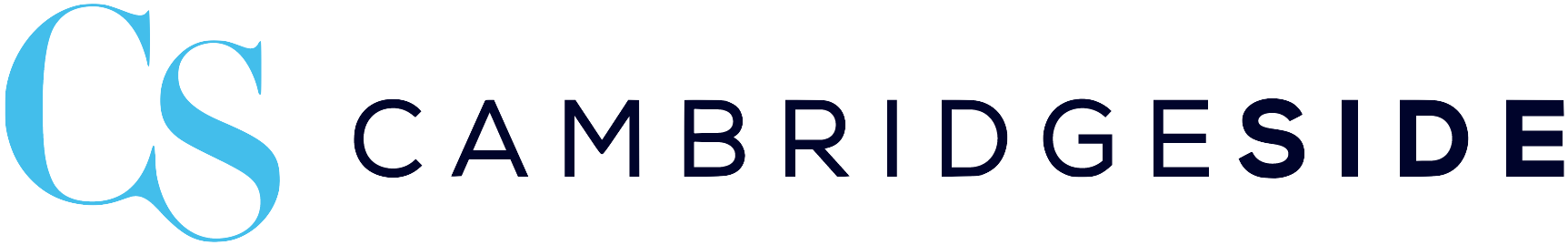

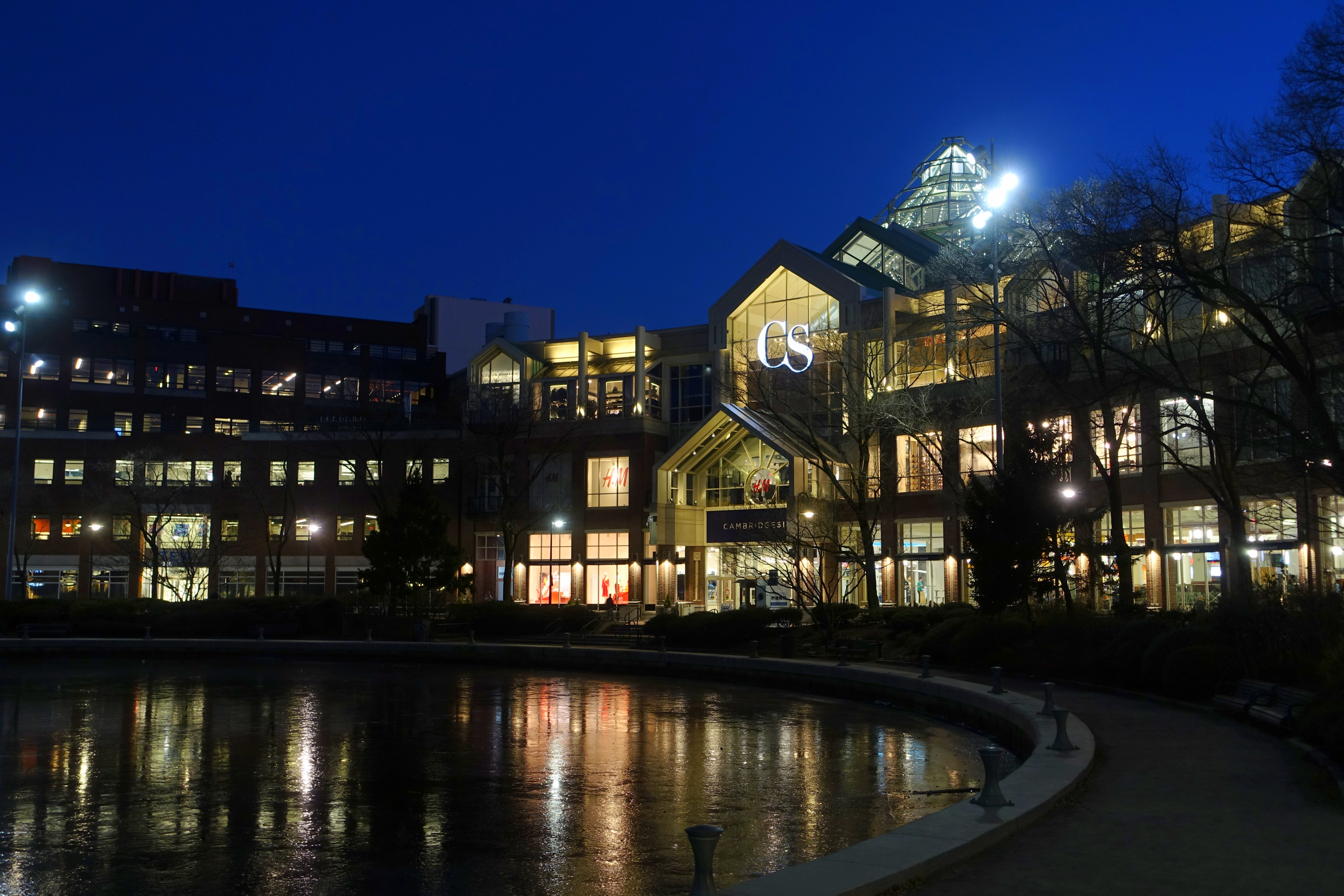
- Exterior of CambridgeSide (2018)
- Location: Cambridge, Massachusetts, U.S.
- Coordinates: 42°22′3″N 71°4′34″W
- Address: 100 CambridgeSide Place
- Opened: September 13, 1990; 36 years ago
- Previous names: CambridgeSide Galleria (1990–2017)
- Developer: New England Development Corp.
- Manager: New England Development Corp.
- Owner: UBS Trumbull Property Fund
- Architect: Arrowstreet
- Num. of stores: 80+
- Num. of anchor tenants: 4 (2 open, other 2 vacant)
- Floor area: 1,000,000 square feet (93,000 m^{2})
- Floors: 3 (2 retail, 1 future office)
- Parking: Parking garage
- Public transit: Lechmere: Green Line
- Website: cambridgeside.com

CambridgeSide (previously CambridgeSide Galleria) is an enclosed shopping mall in Cambridge, Massachusetts, that opened in 1990. As of 2023, the mall is anchored by TJ Maxx. Previous anchors include department stores Filene's, Lechmere, Macy's, Macy's Home and Children's, Best Buy and Sears.

== History ==
The center was an outgrowth of the 1978 East Cambridge Riverfront Plan, which sought to revitalize the then-industrial district between Monsignor O'Brien Highway, Cambridge Parkway, and First Street. The east end of CambridgeSide is near the Museum of Science and the north end of CambridgeSide is near the MBTA Lechmere station on the Green Line E branch. It is also located along the Lechmere Canal off the Charles River.

In October 2018, it was announced that Sears would be closing in December 2018.

In January 2019, Macy's announced that the Macy's Home and Children's store would also be closing in mid-2019.

On December 27, 2020, Macy's closed permanently as part of a plan to close 46 stores nationwide.

On May 14, 2022, it was announced that Best Buy would be closing on June 4, 2022 which will leave TJ Maxx as the only anchor left.

Since September 13, 2024, the mall has hosted Harry Potter: The Exhibition. The exhibit features many authentic props and costumes from the Harry Potter films and the Broadway production. The exhibit also has interactive features and was created and developed by Warner Bros. Discovery Global.

== Notes ==
- King, John (December 24, 1988). "The tide turns at E. Cambridge riverfront". The Boston Globe. p. 41.
- Mehegan, David (September 6, 1990). "The Big Gamble: Can new Cambridge mall make it in gloomy economy?". The Boston Globe. p. 39.
- Community Development Department, City of Cambridge. East Cambridge Riverfront Plan. City of Cambridge, Massachusetts, 1978.
