= Lechmere =

Defunct American retail store chain

Lechmere, Inc.
- Formerly: Lechmere Harness Shop; Lechmere Vulcanizing Company; Lechmere Tire & Sales Company
- Type: Subsidiary
- Industry: Retail
- Founded: June 5, 1913; 113 years ago in Cambridge, Massachusetts, United States
- Founder: Abraham Cohen
- Defunct: November 7, 1997; 29 years ago
- Fate: Bankruptcy And Liquidation
- Headquarters: Cambridge, Massachusetts, United States (1913–1979); Woburn, Massachusetts, United States (1979–1997)
- Number of locations: 27 (1997)
- Areas served: New England; Alabama; Georgia; New York; North Carolina
- Products: Electronics; housewares; appliances; exercise equipment; footwear; music
- Parent: Dayton's (1968–1989); Berkshire Partners (1989–1994); Montgomery Ward (1994–1997)

Lechmere (Note: /ˈliːtʃmɪər/, LEECH-meer) was an American retail store chain founded in 1913 by Abraham Cohen. The name was inspired by the Lechmere Square part of Cambridge, Massachusetts where the first store was located. It originated as a harness shop, and evolved to include tires, electronics, and general merchandise. Most stores were located in New England, although there were some locations in Alabama, Georgia, New York, North Carolina, and South Carolina. Lechmere was shuttered with the bankruptcy and liquidation of parent company Montgomery Ward in 1997.

== History ==
The origins of the chain date to 1913, when Russian immigrant and founder Abraham Cohen purchased a harness shop in Cambridge, Massachusetts. Cohen subsequently renamed it Lechmere Harness Shop for the district of Cambridge it was located in, Lechmere. As the automobile rose in popularity over the next decade, the store began selling tires and was renamed Lechmere Vulcanizing Company. When his children—sons Maurice, Philip, and Norman and daughter Nan—entered the business after World War II, it added sales of consumer appliances. In 1948, the company was renamed Lechmere Tire & Sales Company, and was incorporated. Household goods, televisions, and other goods were added to the merchandising mix in the 1950s, as were luggage, sporting goods, toys, and lawn and garden accessories.

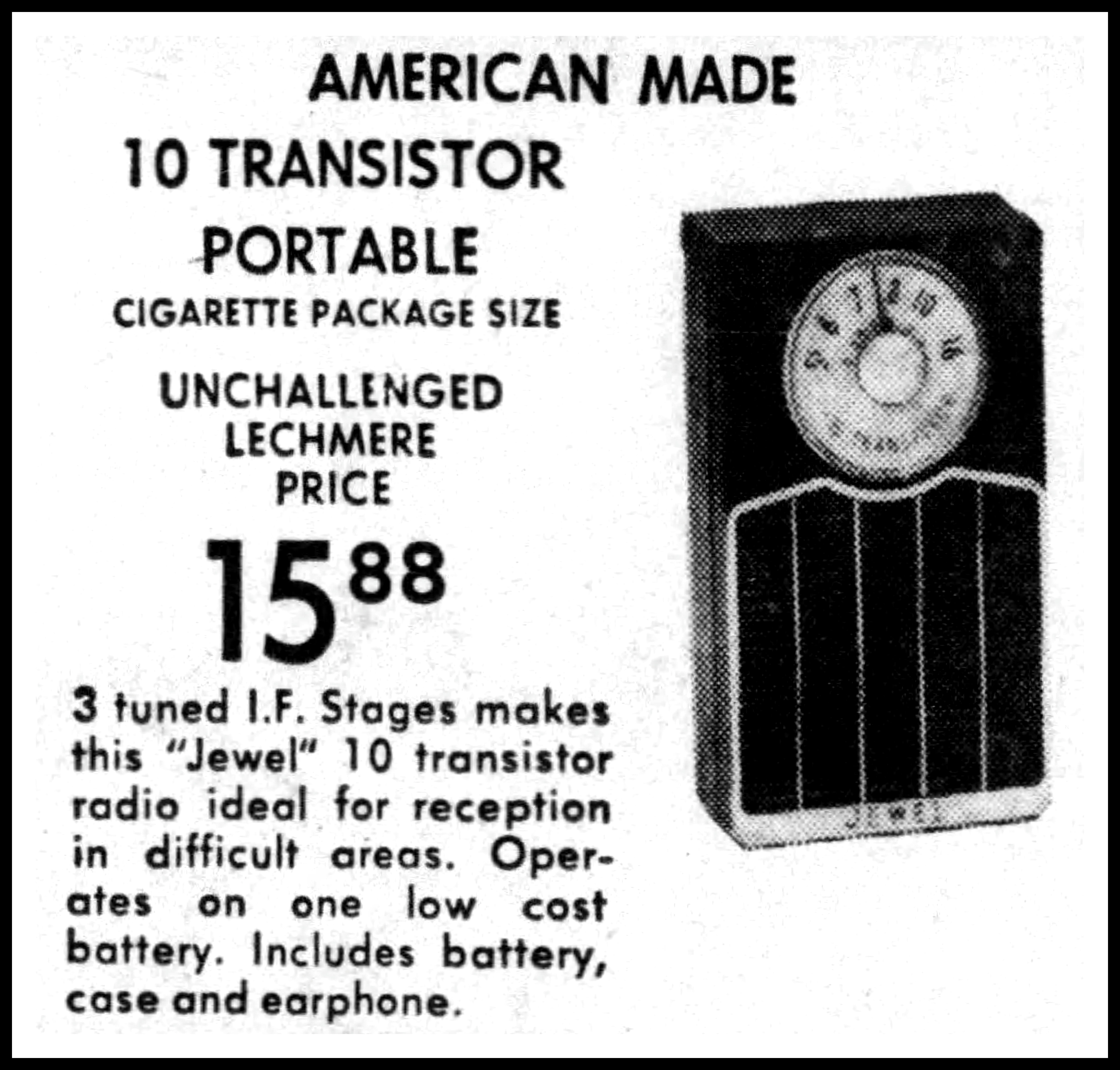
A 1962 Lechmere advertisement for a transistor radio

The first store moved to a former bus garage on 88 First Street in Cambridge in 1956, furthering the expansion of the merchandise mix. Lechmere also began advertising on television in the 1950s, and ended all of its prices in 88 to represent the store's address. The First Street building was expanded in 1962 to a 100,000 square feet (9,300 m^{2}) store, to which office equipment, jewelry, hardware, and further goods were added. A second store later opened on November 1, 1965 in Dedham.

=== Acquisition by Dayton's ===
In 1968, in order to capitalize further growth, the Cohens sold the chain to Dayton's, a department store based in Minneapolis, Minnesota. The new parent company became Dayton Hudson Corporation soon after the purchase, and is now Target Corporation. Dayton maintained Lechmere as a separate subsidiary and mostly left its operations in the Cohens' hands. With Dayton Hudson's resources now behind it, Lechmere opened stores in Danvers and Springfield. Their long-standing logo was introduced in fall 1970 and used until store closure.

The Cohens retained day-to-day control of the chain until the mid-1970s. With the Cohens' retirement, Lechmere's merchandise mix changed to a discount department store line. Due to declining sales, the chain began cutting prices as well. Stores in Manchester, New Hampshire, and Framingham, Massachusetts, were added in 1977 and 1978, respectively.

Lechmere introduced many retailing innovations, including discount pricing and a central pick-up counter to make shopping easier for customers. The merchandising strategy included offering items at many different price points to offer something for every customer and prices on major appliances listed in code so that customers would have to talk to a salesperson to find out the cost. Every year on Washington's Birthday, Lechmere had a sale, which featured 22-cent cherry pies to draw customers.

Despite the opening of new stores, Lechmere's sales continued to decline, until when C. George Scala was named CEO in 1980. He changed the merchandise mix again to housewares, appliances, sporting goods, electronics, and music. In 1981, the company name was simplified to Lechmere, Inc. It also began expanding outside its New England base, including locations such as Charlotte, North Carolina, Birmingham, Alabama, and Atlanta, Georgia. From 1983 to 1988, annual sales grew from $200 million to over $700 million, while operating profit grew from $19 million to $22 million, in approximate figures.

=== Decline and liquidation ===
Berkshire Partners and Boston-based mall developers Steve Karp and Steve Wiener bought the chain from Dayton Hudson in 1989. As a condition of this sale, stores in the Southeastern United States were closed. In 1992, the company successfully went to the Supreme Court in Lechmere, Inc. v. NLRB to block union organizers from being on their property. Berkshire Partners sold Lechmere to Montgomery Ward Holdings in 1994, in a deal worth more than $200 million (~$393 million in 2025).

On August 1, 1997, Montgomery Ward announced that all Lechmere stores were to be closed as part of their bankruptcy reorganization. At the time of the chain's closing, 27 stores remained open, including 20 in New England, 12 of which were in Massachusetts. All six "Home Image by Lechmere" stores were also closed at that time. November 7, 1997, was the last day of business for all locations.
