= Haymarket (Boston) =

Open-air market in Boston, Massachusetts

Haymarket - Boston
- Market (place)
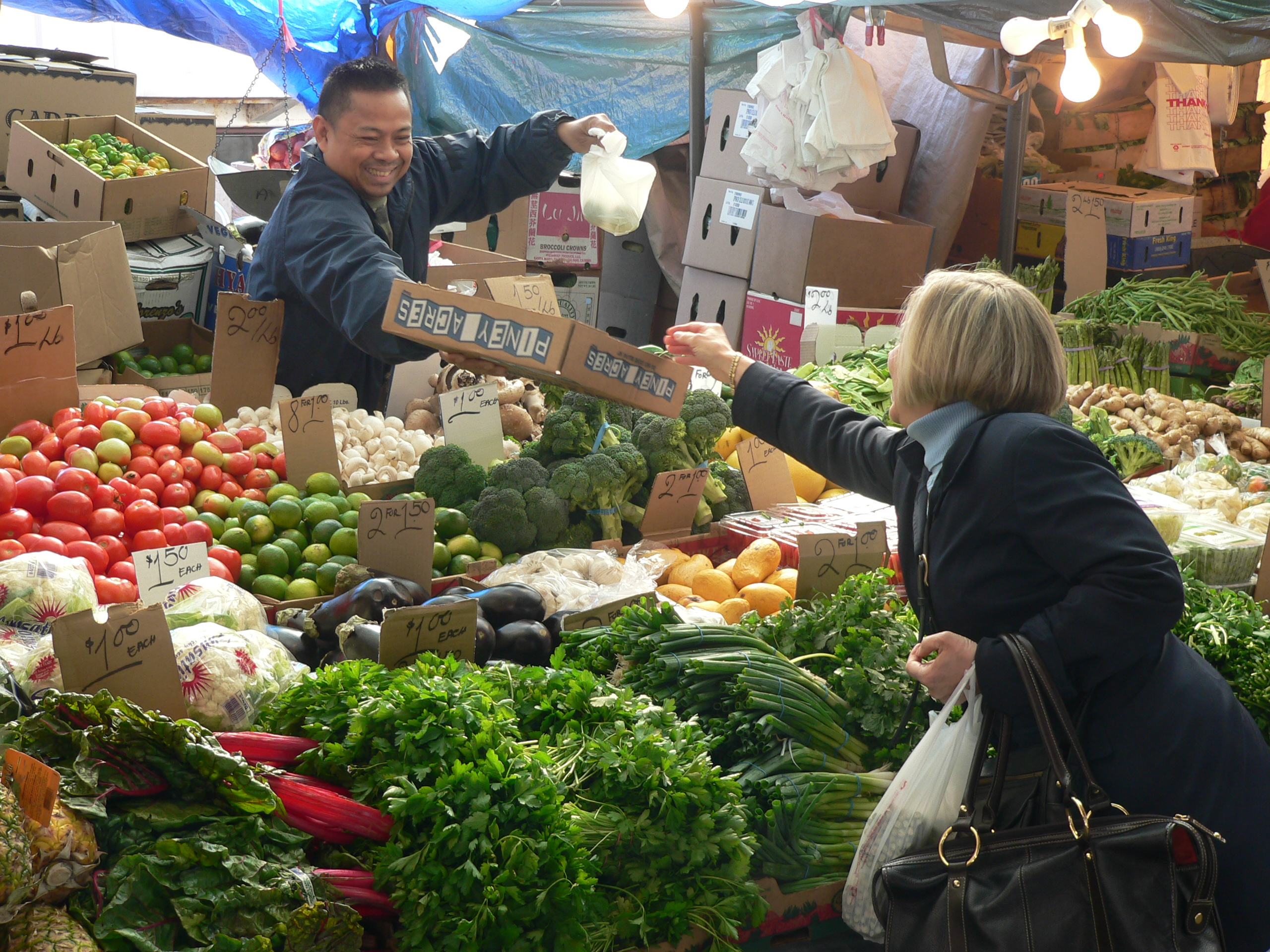
- Features: produce and seafood market
- Opened: Friday and Saturday
- Manager: Haymarket Pushcart Association
- Location: Boston; Blackstone St between Hanover and North Sts
- Interactive map of Haymarket - Boston
- Coordinates: 42°21′41.7″N 71°3′21.9″W
- Website: Haymarket

Haymarket in Boston is an open-air market on Blackstone, Hanover, and North Streets, next to the Rose Fitzgerald Kennedy Greenway between the North End and Government Center.

The market is operated by the Haymarket Pushcart Association, which traces its history to 1820 and formally organized in 1974 to negotiate with the city on issues such as waste removal and traffic. The roughly 50 Haymarket vendors sell fruit, vegetables, and seafood at very low prices. The market offers "produce its vendors obtain from wholesale distribution terminals north of Boston," primarily the New England Produce Center in Chelsea. Prices are low because the wholesale markets need to make room for new shipments arriving over the weekend.

The market is open from 6AM to 7PM every Friday and Saturday. On Saturday nights nearing the 7 pm closing deadline, vendors often liquidate any remaining inventory selling whatever they have left for pennies on the dollar. The market's location and days of operation were established by a 1952 state law and by a 1978 city ordinance. Vendors are licensed by the City of Boston Inspectional Services Department.

The market is adjacent to the MBTA station of the same name, which is served by two subway lines and many bus routes. Inexpensive validated parking for Haymarket shoppers is available at the Parcel 7 Garage. The discount was created as a "mitigation" measure for the impact of the Big Dig highway project on Haymarket.

A study conducted for the Boston Redevelopment Authority in 2009 by the Project for Public Spaces found that "Haymarket attracts one of the most diverse populations of any market we have worked on. ... Customers include almost every imaginable ethnic group and income level. Haymarket is the primary place where most of its shoppers buy produce and it serves a vital role in the Boston food distribution system." In 2015, two Johns Hopkins University graduate students proposed the creation in Baltimore of a market modeled after Haymarket, to address the problems of food going to waste and the lack of access to fresh produce in low-income communities.

== History ==
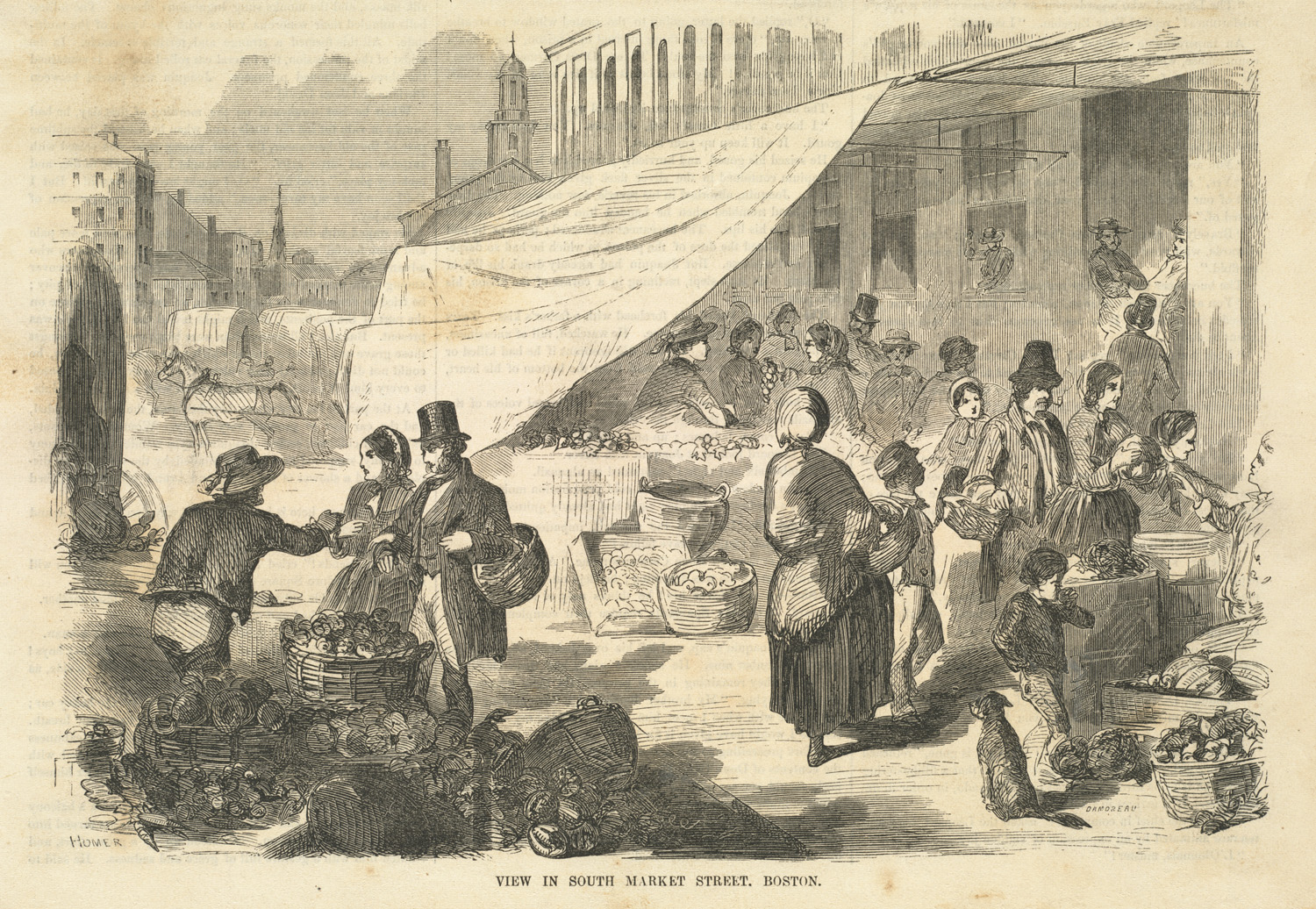
View in South Market Street, Boston (Winslow Homer)

Markets have operated in this part of Boston since the 1600s. The first market buildings were constructed in 1734. The indoor market at Faneuil Hall opened in 1742. Open-air markets have been in continuous existence in the vicinity since early in the 19th century, with many transformations over the years. The Haymarket Pushcart Association traces its roots to 1820.

In the early 20th century, hundreds of street vendors did business on 24 city blocks. Laws passed beginning in 1908 limited the locations where vendors could set up shop. The predecessor of today's market was relocated from Haymarket Square in 1952 to make way for construction of the elevated Central Artery. A state law passed in that year designates the current location of Haymarket for use by "hawkers and peddlers" on Fridays and Saturdays.

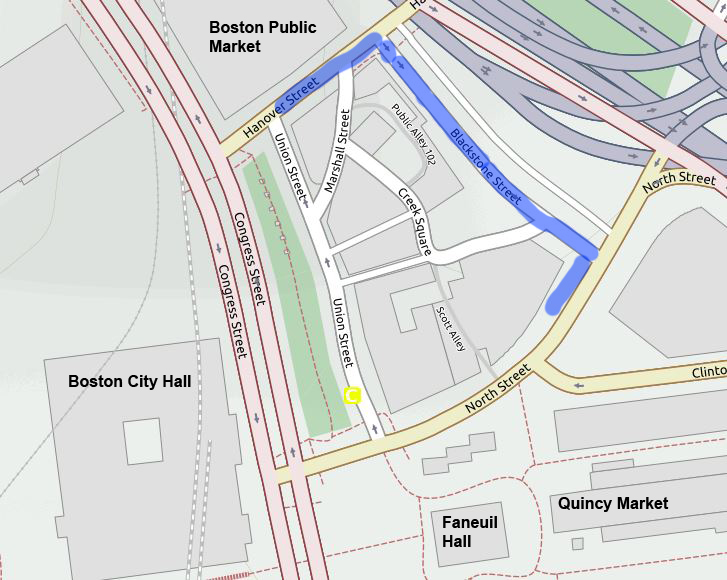
Location of Haymarket pushcart vendors shown in blue on a map of downtown Boston.

Through much of the 20th century, most Haymarket vendors were of Italian ancestry. Today the mix of vendors is more diverse. According to Haymarket Pushcart Association President Otto Gallotto, "This place has always been an immigrants' market with affordable prices. From when the Irish and Italians came to Boston and even now, we have every ethnicity both buying and selling at Haymarket."

The market takes its name from Haymarket Square, a former town square that was located a block to the north, where some vendors operated during the 19th century and the first half of the 20th century. The market is located on the Freedom Trail, adjacent to the Blackstone Block Historic District, which is "the oldest extant city block in the country." This part of Boston has been called the "Market District" since at least 1910. The name was in use through at least the 1950s, then fell out of use, and has recently been revived. The Market District also includes the indoor Boston Public Market (which opened in 2015), Quincy Market, and a market in the proposed Haymarket Square Hotel.

The Pushcart Association celebrated its 200th anniversary in 2020.

== Criticism ==
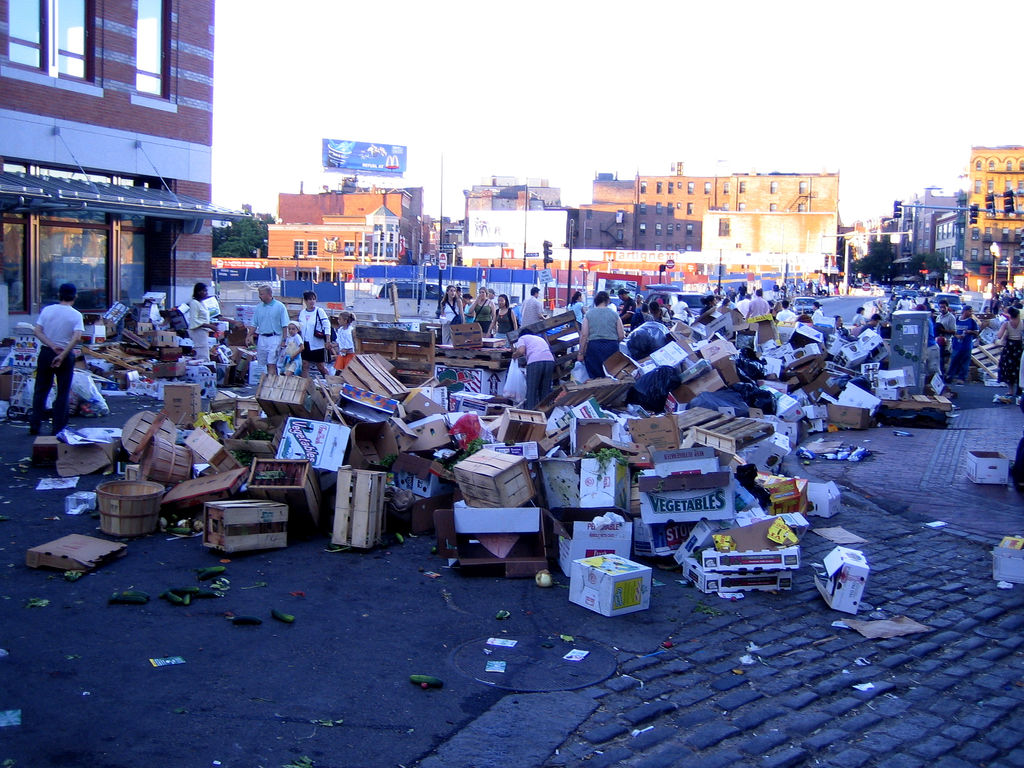
Aftermath of market day, 2005, before installation of trash compactors

Haymarket inspires strong feelings, both for and against, among Boston residents and visitors.

Conflicts between Haymarket vendors and the City of Boston have arisen at times over issues including trash and truck parking. A 2005 Boston Globe article quoted then-Mayor Thomas Menino: "Haymarket is part of the uniqueness of Boston. My parents took me there when I was a kid. I wouldn't want the vendors to not be part of the Boston landscape. We want people to be able to buy affordable fruit and vegetables. But [the vendors] have to meet us halfway. They can't continue to live outside the rules. We have to have constructive dialogue with them."

Concerns about odor and litter led the City of Boston to install several large trash compactors on the site in 2009.

== Art and culture ==
In 1976, the Massachusetts Bicentennial Commission and the City of Boston commissioned a public art installation in the streets and sidewalks used for the market. The installation, called "Asaroton, 1976", by Mags Harries and Lajos Heder, was described by the artists as follows: "The embedded bronze pieces replicate the trash and debris that might normally cover the street. When the stalls and real debris of the farmer's market cover the art, it becomes part of a living experience. On the other days of the week it is a memory of the market." The installation was removed prior to the Big Dig construction, and stored at the Museum of Science. An updated version was reinstalled at Haymarket in 2006.

Scenes in the 1968 movie The Thomas Crown Affair, the 1972 movie Fuzz, and the 1982 movie Hanky Panky were filmed at Haymarket.

Haymarket is a frequent subject for local artists and photographers.

== Recent changes ==
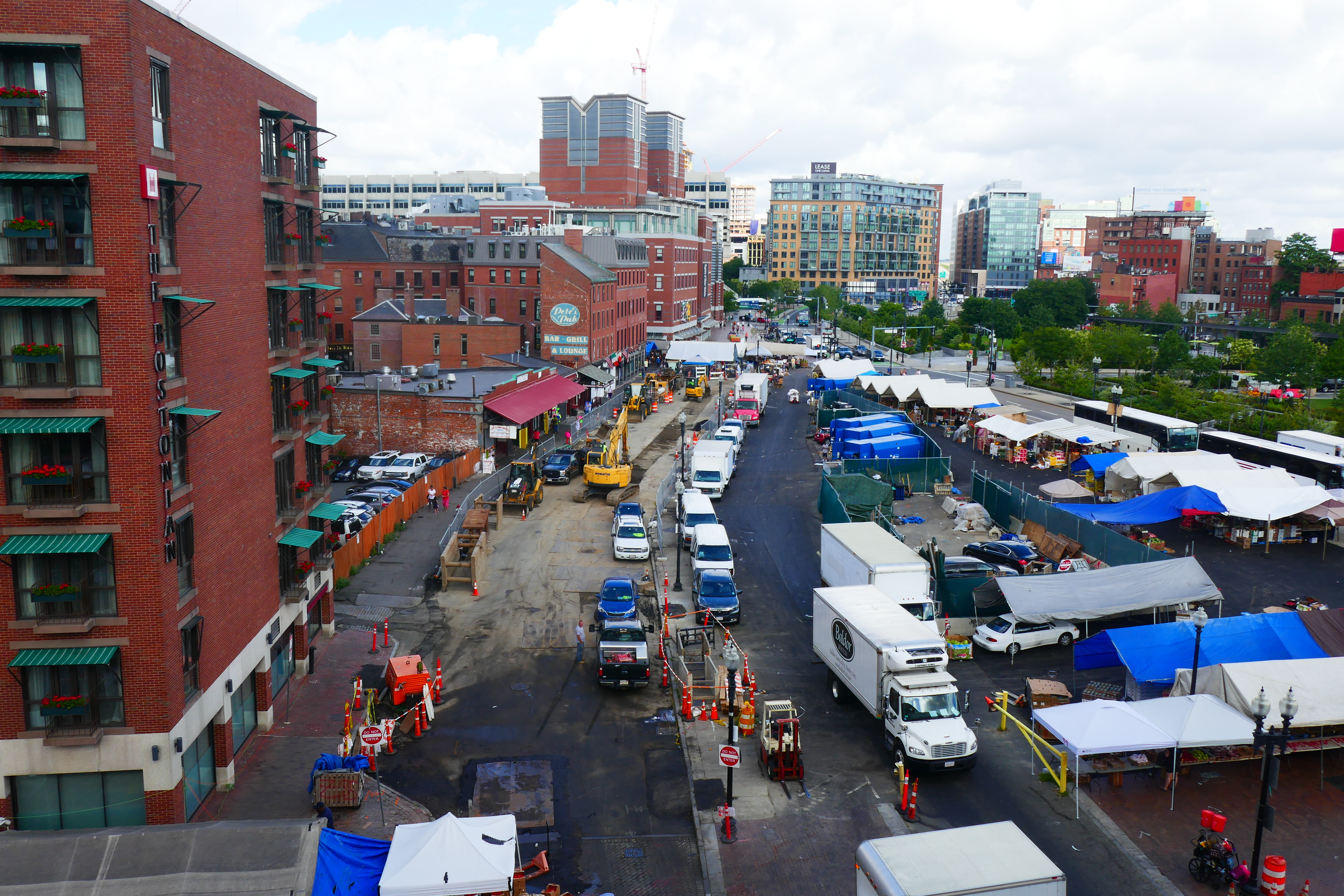
Haymarket pushcart market relocated from Blackstone Street to Parcel 9 in 2018 as Blackstone Street is reconstructed

Haymarket is adjacent to and until 2018 made use of part of a Big Dig development site called Parcel 9. The Massachusetts Department of Transportation (MassDOT) secured a developer for Parcel 9 under a Request for Proposals issued in 2011. The RFP requires the developer of Parcel 9 to work with the Haymarket Pushcart Association on numerous enhancements to the existing market, including creating space for some vendors within the Parcel 9 building; providing waste handling, utility, office, storage, and restroom facilities for the market; and rebuilding the curbs and sidewalks of Blackstone Street and Hanover Street to make the market accessible to customers with limited mobility. The City of Boston Zoning Code includes "design guidelines" for Parcel 9 stating that any building on the parcel must be designed in a way "allowing the Haymarket pushcart/food vendor activities to continue to occur along Blackstone Street."

The Haymarket Pushcart Association initially opposed residential condominium development on Parcel 9, arguing that new condo owners would object to the ongoing operations of the market. Four proposals were received in 2012 response to the RFP, including two apartment developments, a hotel, and a proposal for The Boston Museum.

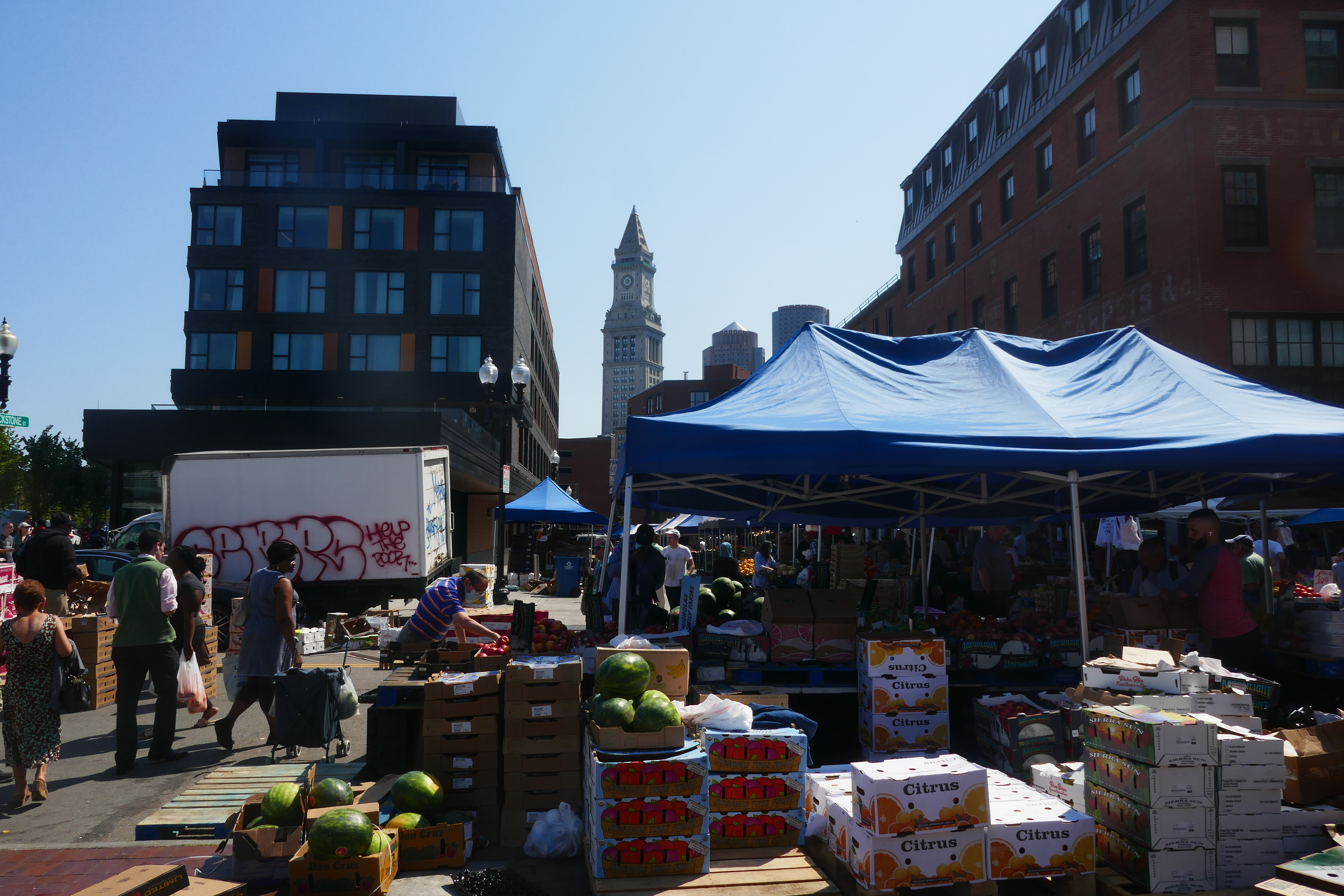
The Canopy Hotel opened in 2022, adjacent to the market

In 2013, MassDOT accepted a proposal from Normandy Real Estate Partners for construction of the "Haymarket Square Hotel." In April 2016, a revised plan for the proposed hotel was submitted for review by the Boston Redevelopment Authority. The BRA board approved the proposal in June 2016.

The initial phase of the project began in 2018, with the relocation of most of the Haymarket vendors from Blackstone Street onto Parcel 9, to permit the reconstruction of Blackstone Street. After this phase was completed, the vendors returned to Blackstone Street, and construction of the "Canopy Hotel Boston Downtown" began in fall 2019. The hotel opened in 2022.

=== Historic photos ===
- Early 20th century photos by Leslie Jones from Boston Public Library
- Early 20th century photos by Arthur Griffin from Griffin Museum of Photography
- 1950s photos by Nishan Bichajian from the MIT Libraries Kepes/Lynch Collection on Flickr
- Historic photos on Digital Commonwealth
- Scenes from Haymarket: Boston Globe 2005 photo essay
