= Haymarket Square (Boston) =

Former square in Boston, Massachusetts

Coordinates: 42°21′48.1″N 71°03′30.8″W

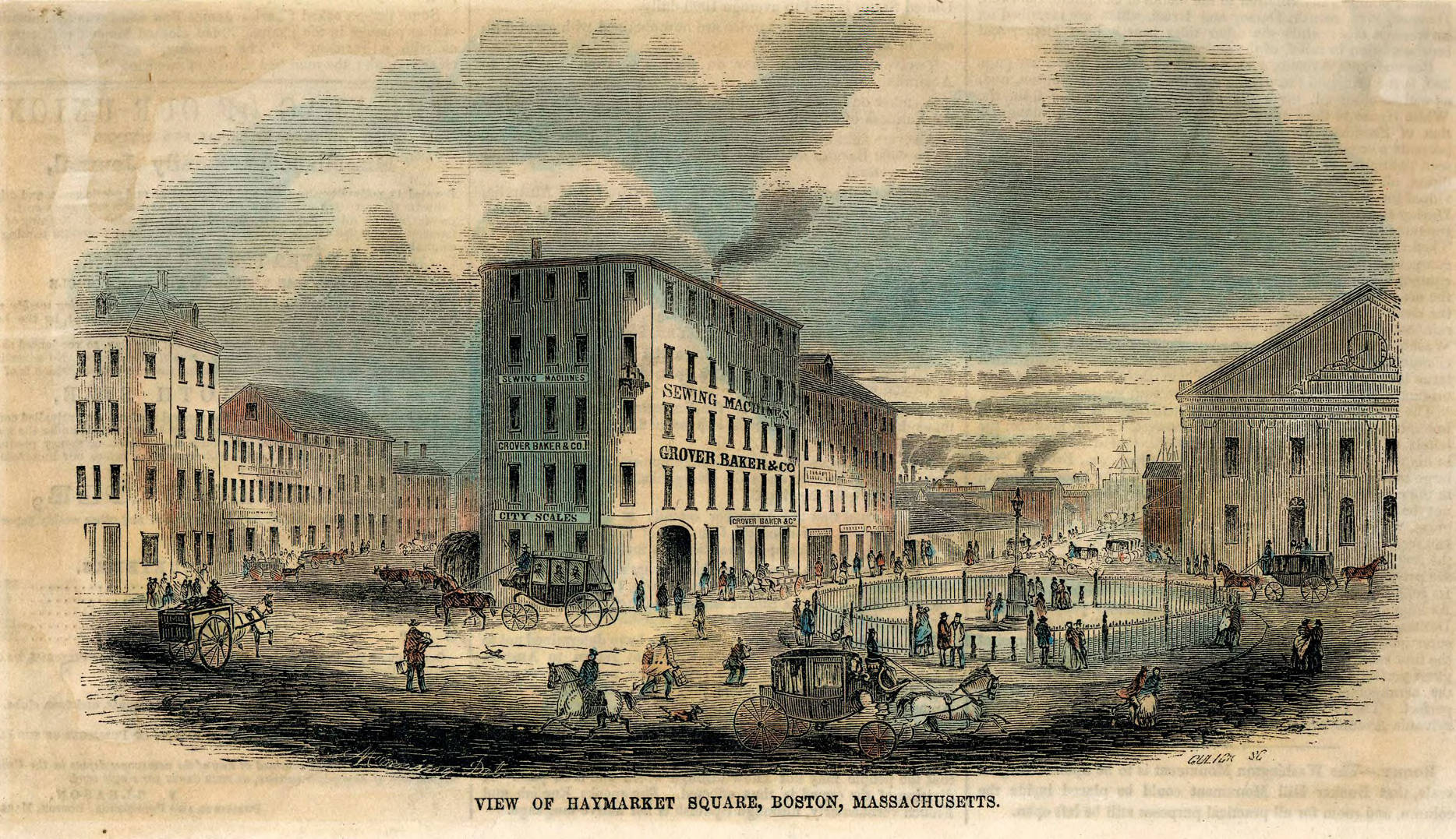
View of Haymarket Square, an 1863 illustration

Haymarket Square is the historic name of a former town square in Boston, located between the North End, Government Center, the Bulfinch Triangle, and the West End. The square was a well-known feature of Boston from the mid-19th century to the mid-20th century, when the buildings around it were demolished to make way for the Central Artery and Government Center. The Haymarket produce market continues to operate at a location near the historic site of the square. The Haymarket MBTA station extends under the former site of the square.

== 17th and 18th centuries: Mill Cove to Mill Pond ==
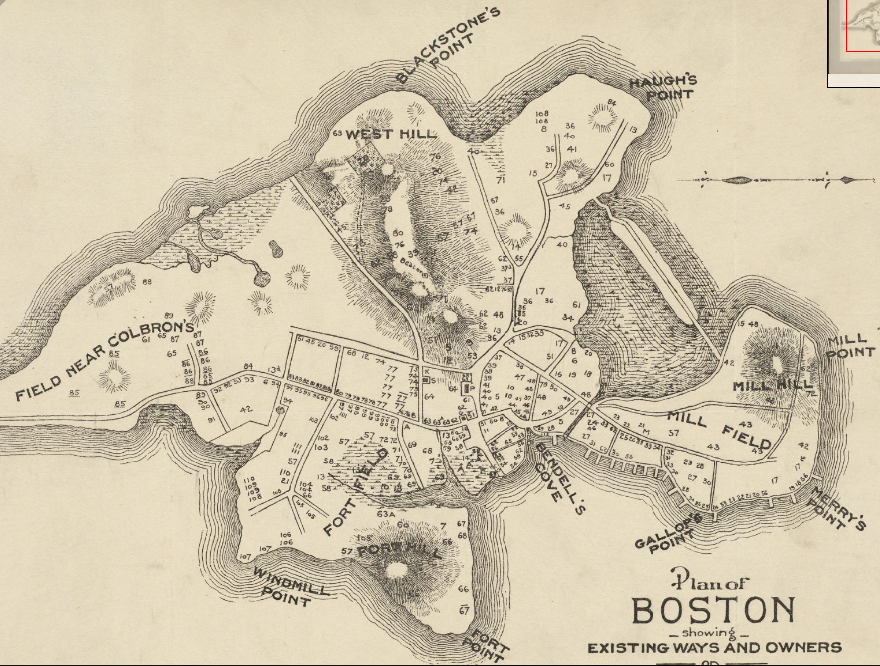
1645 map

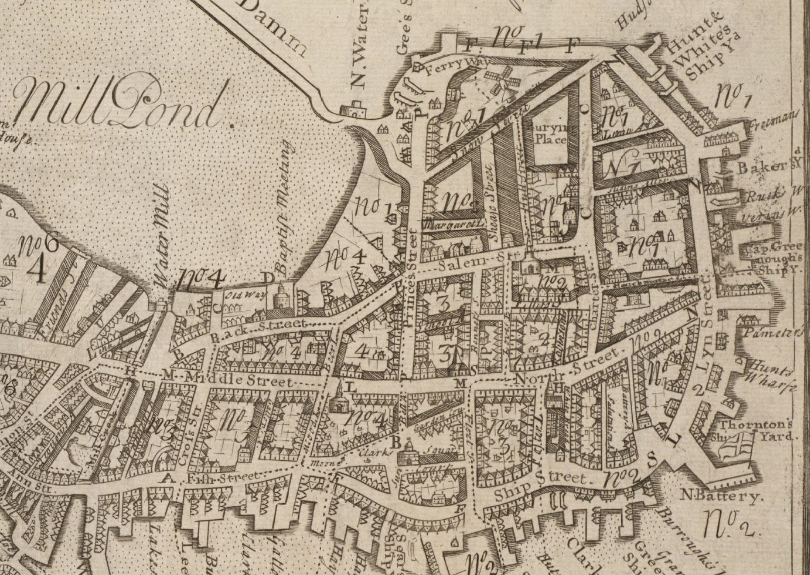
1743 map

During the early years of European settlement, the future site of Haymarket Square was in a part of Boston Harbor called Mill Cove. The cove (not labeled) appears to the southwest of Mill Hill (later renamed Copp's Hill) on the 1645 map.

The mouth of Mill Cove was dammed in the 1640s, turning it into Mill Pond. Several mills and rum distilleries, powered by tidal water flows, were built on the shores of the pond.

The future location of Haymarket was just north of the "Water Mill" shown on the 1743 map.

== 19th century: creation of the square ==
Mill Pond was cut off from most water flows by the mill dam, and was used as a waste dumping site by neighboring homes and businesses. The polluted water was regarded as a source of disease. At the same time, population growth led town officials to look for ways to increase the supply of buildable land.

In 1807, the town of Boston gave the Boston Mill Corporation (under the leadership of William Tudor and Harrison Gray Otis) permission to begin filling in the pond. A street plan for the filled land was proposed in 1808 by Charles Bulfinch. Filling of the pond to create the area now known as the Bulfinch Triangle was completed in 1828. The fill material was obtained by cutting down a portion of Beacon Hill. The future location of Haymarket Square, where Merrimack, Canal, and Charleston Streets converged at the southern tip of the Bulfinch Triangle, appears on an 1826 map.

Maps from as early as 1814 show a market at the intersection of Merrimack, Canal, and Charlestown Streets. The name "Haymarket Square" appears on an 1844 map. No earlier map on the City of Boston atlas includes the name. A drawing published in 1895 entitled "View of the New Land in 1828" also shows the name "Haymarket Square". The name was applied because the square was "the site of one of several public scales used for weighing and selling hay." Images from the mid-1800s show hay being sold in the square. The Haymarket Pushcart Association, which traces its history to 1820, still operates the Haymarket market a block away.

From its opening in 1845 to its demolition in 1897, the most prominent building on the square was the Boston and Maine Railroad depot. According to an 1892 guidebook, "The Boston and Maine Railroad, alone of all lines entering the city on the north side, enjoys the privilege of penetrating within the outer street. Its station is in Haymarket Square, and the open space in front of it gives prominence to the structure." The railroad provided service to Lowell, Portland, and Lake Winnipesaukee.

In 1893, the depot was replaced by North Union Station, several blocks to the north on Causeway Street. The depot was demolished to make way for construction of the Haymarket Relief Station (a branch of Boston City Hospital) and the Canal Street incline (the northern end of the Tremont Street subway, the predecessor to the MBTA Green Line). The Haymarket station on the subway line opened in 1898, with an entrance kiosk in the center of Haymarket Square. Workers excavating for the station and incline uncovered a portion of the wall of the Middlesex Canal, which formerly terminated at the square.

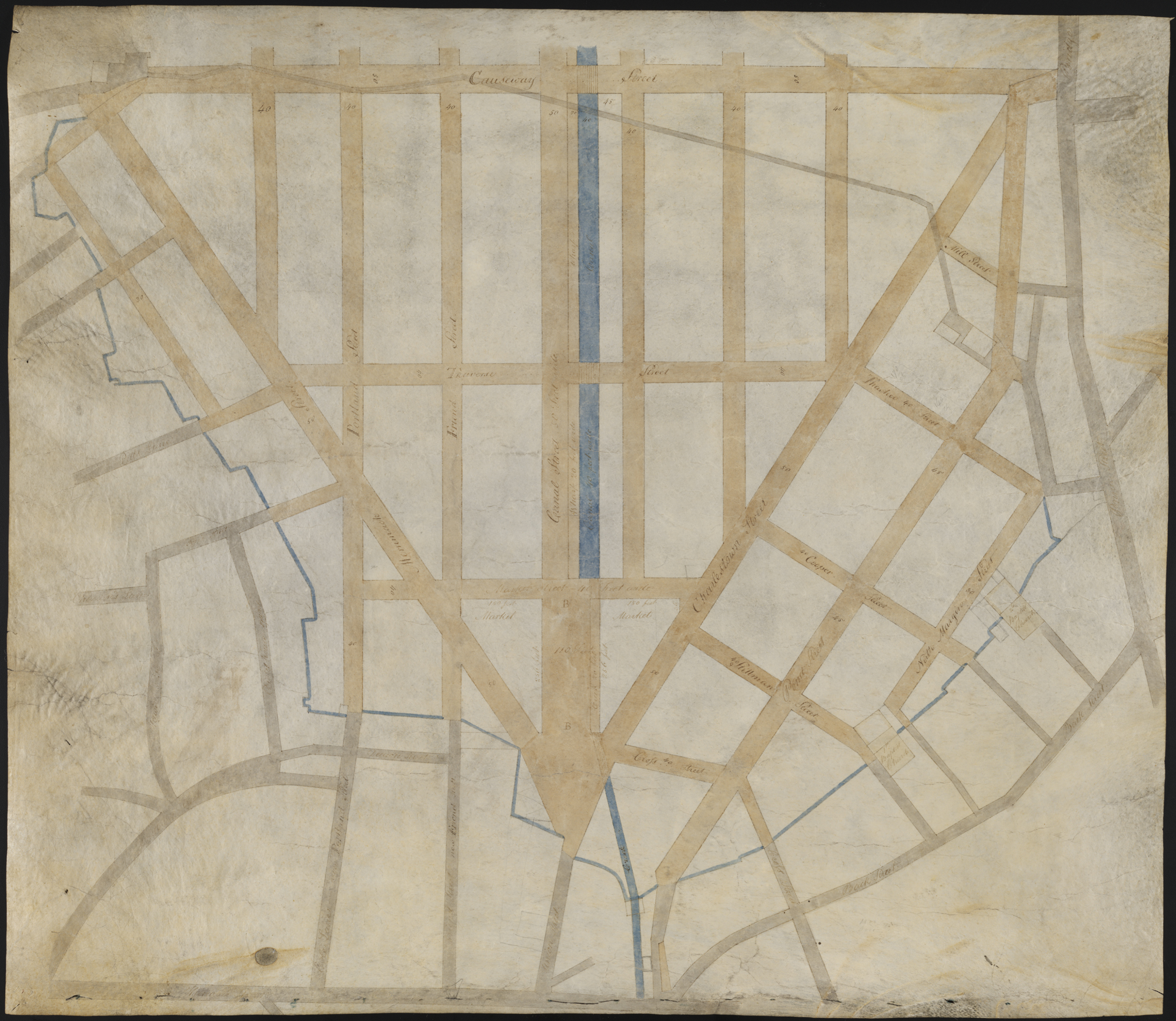
Plan for the filling of the Bulfinch Triangle, 1807. Haymarket Square is at bottom center, at the southern end of Canal Street.

"The Taking Down of Beacon Hill", by John Rubens Smith

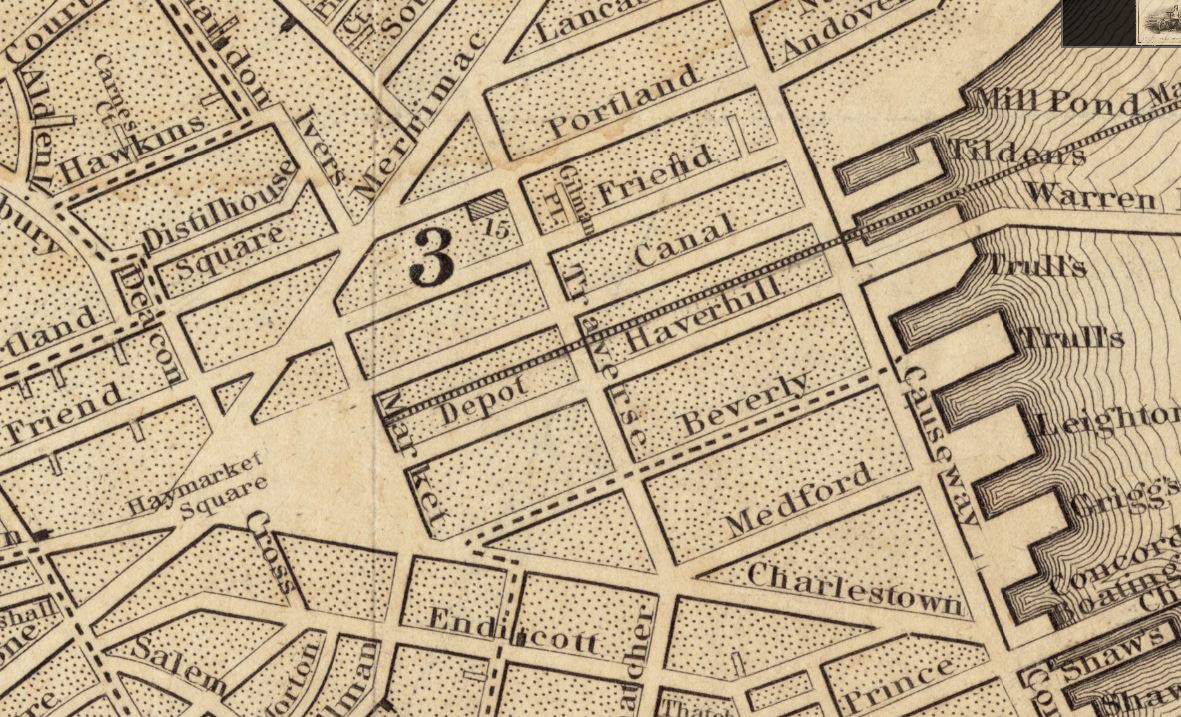
1844 map with the first use of the name "Haymarket Square"

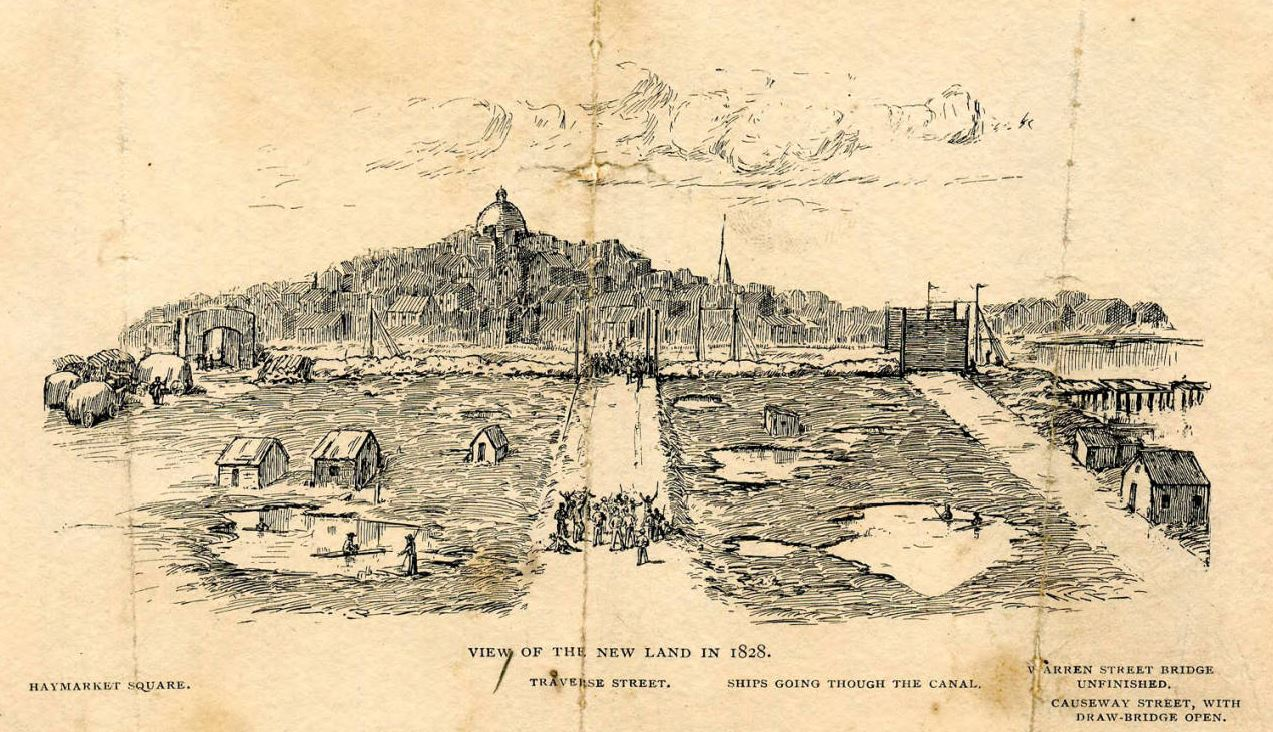
"View of the new land in 1828"

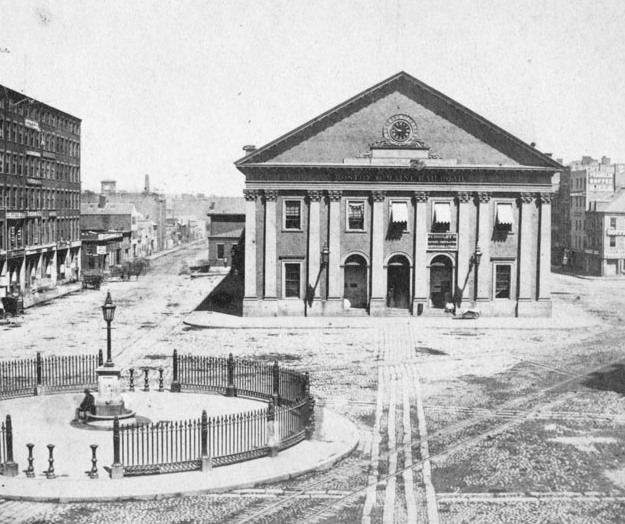
Boston and Maine depot

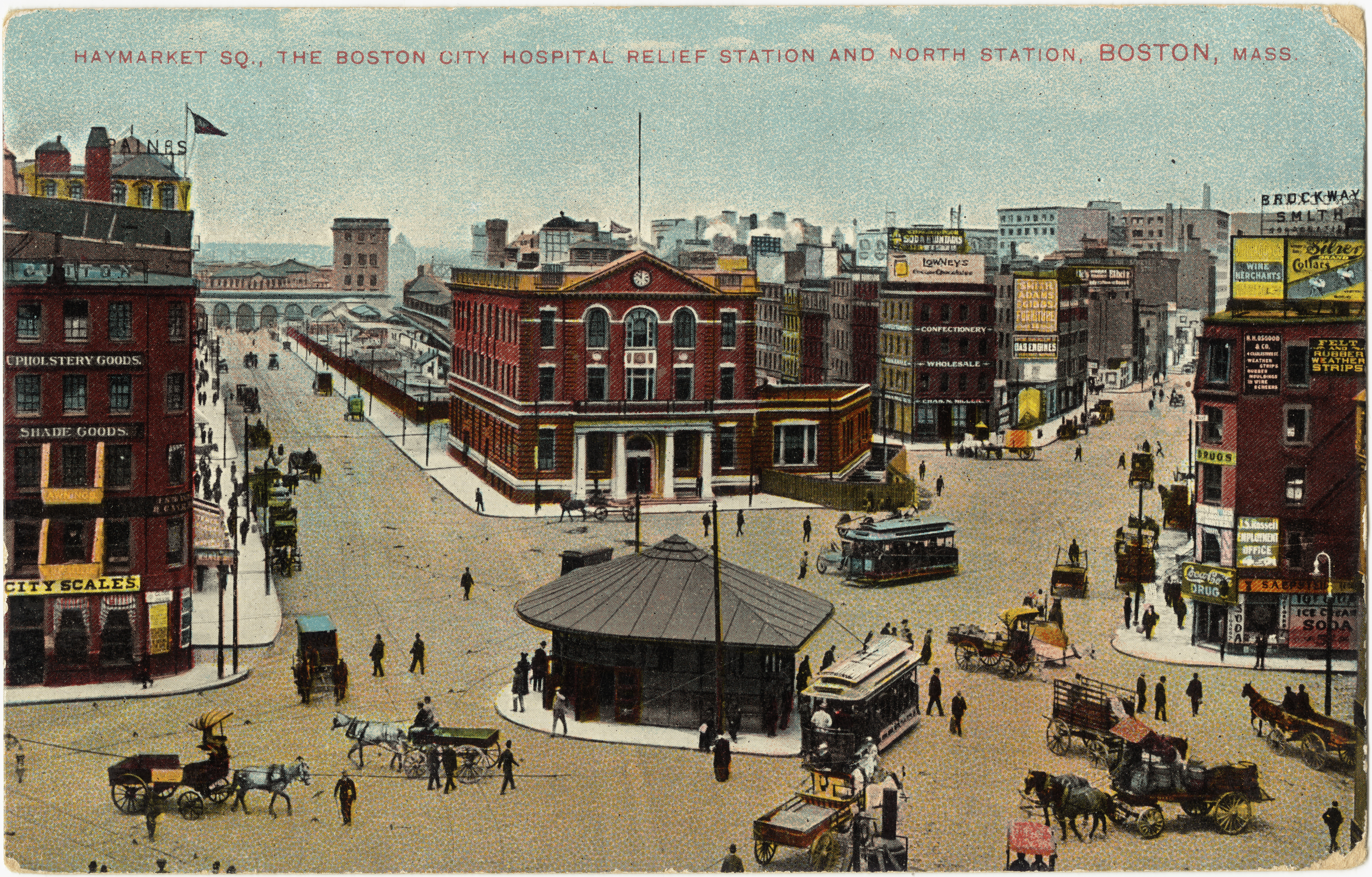
1909 view. The kiosk is an entrance to the Haymarket station of the Tremont Street Subway. The Haymarket Relief Station is at rear.
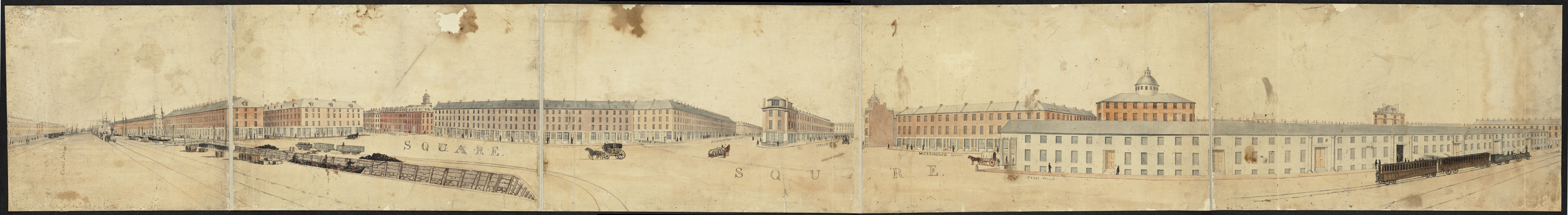
360 degree view of Haymarket Square painted in about 1895, that "purports to show the area in 1835." It shows Haymarket Square connected to Boston Harbor by Canal Street, along which also ran railroad tracks and the canal for which the street was named.

== 20th century: destruction ==
All the buildings around the square, as well as the square itself, were demolished in the 1950s for the construction of the elevated Central Artery or in the 1960s and 1970s for the construction of Government Center. Architectural critic Robert Campbell wrote in 1992 that the former site of the Relief Station resembled "a shell-torn battlefield." During the construction of the 2,300-space Government Center Garage, the MBTA Haymarket Station was rebuilt. The northeast corner of the garage was located on the former location of Haymarket Square.

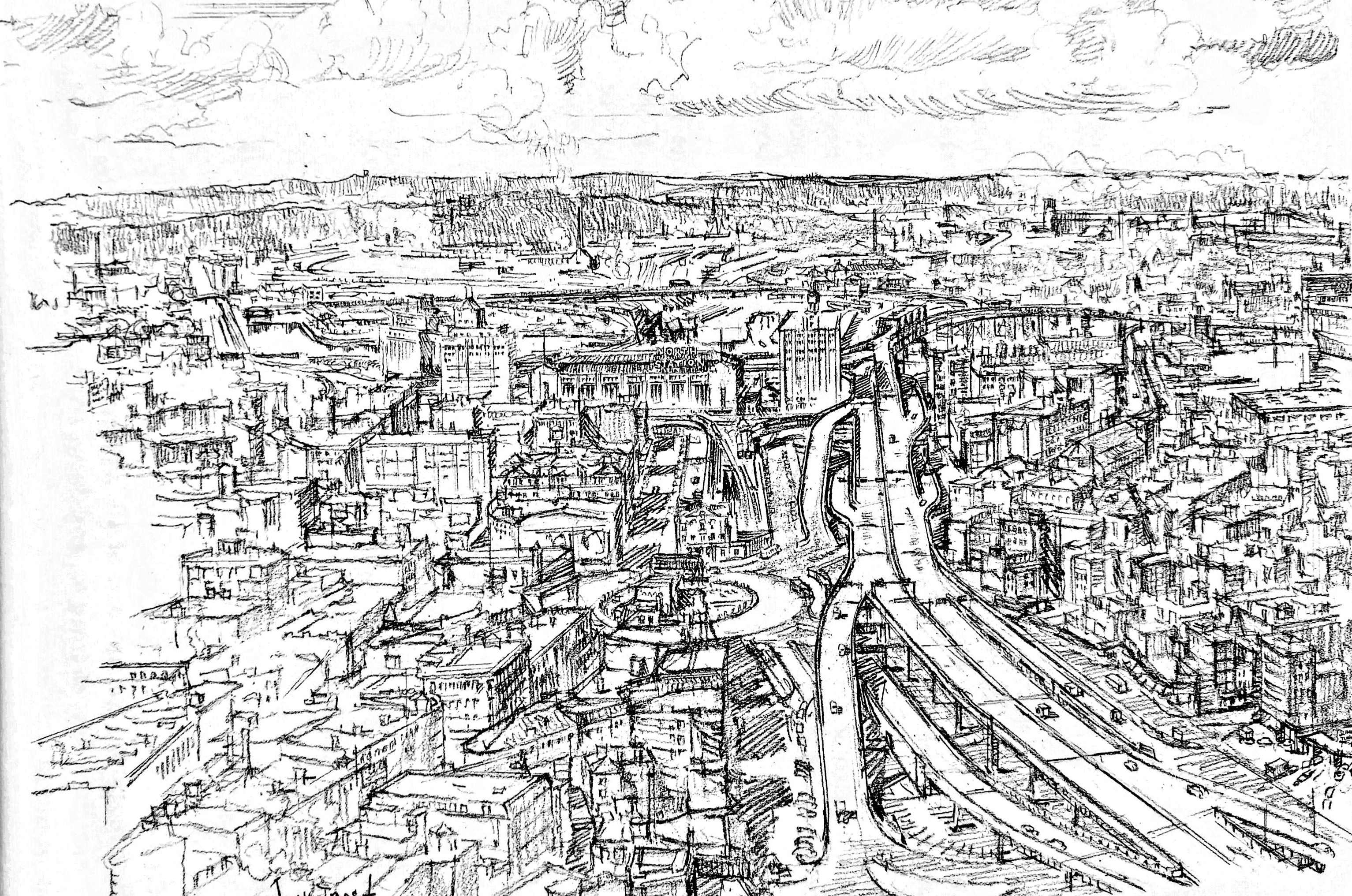
1955 drawing by Jack Frost. Haymarket Square is in the center, with the new Central Artery at right.

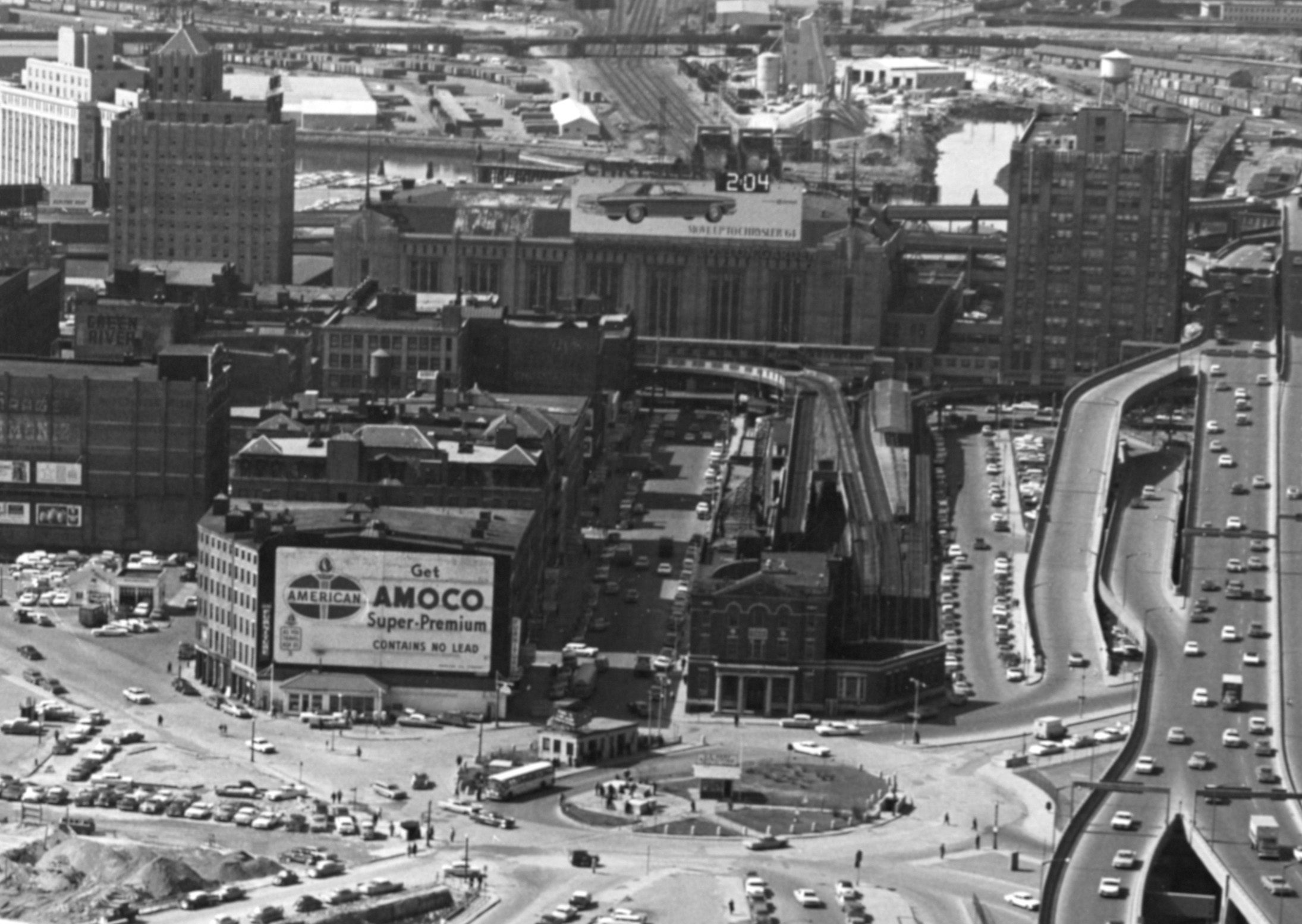
1960s view to the north. The land at the left had been cleared for the construction of Government Center.

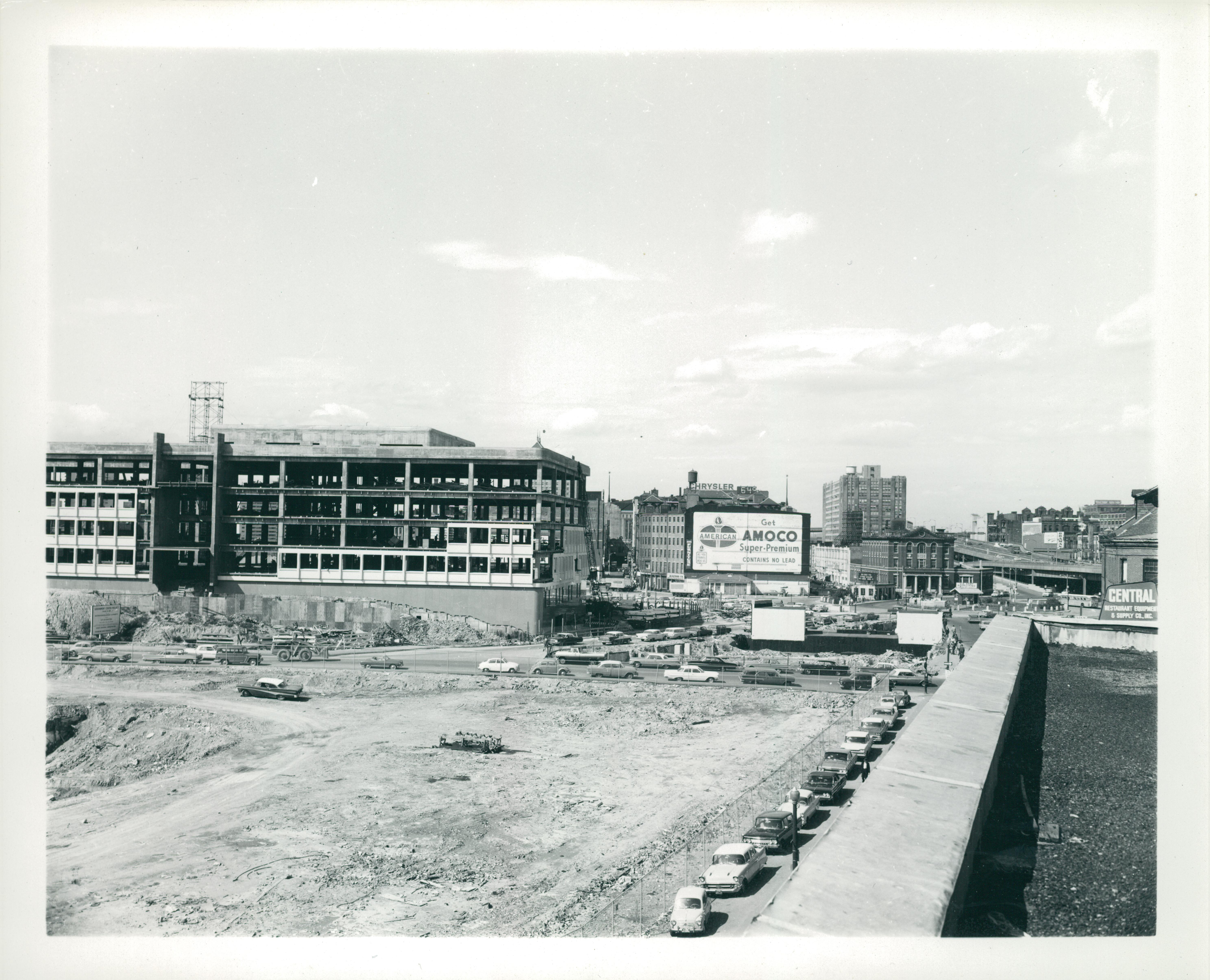
The JFK Federal Building under construction in the 1960s. Haymarket Square and the Haymarket Relief Station are at right.

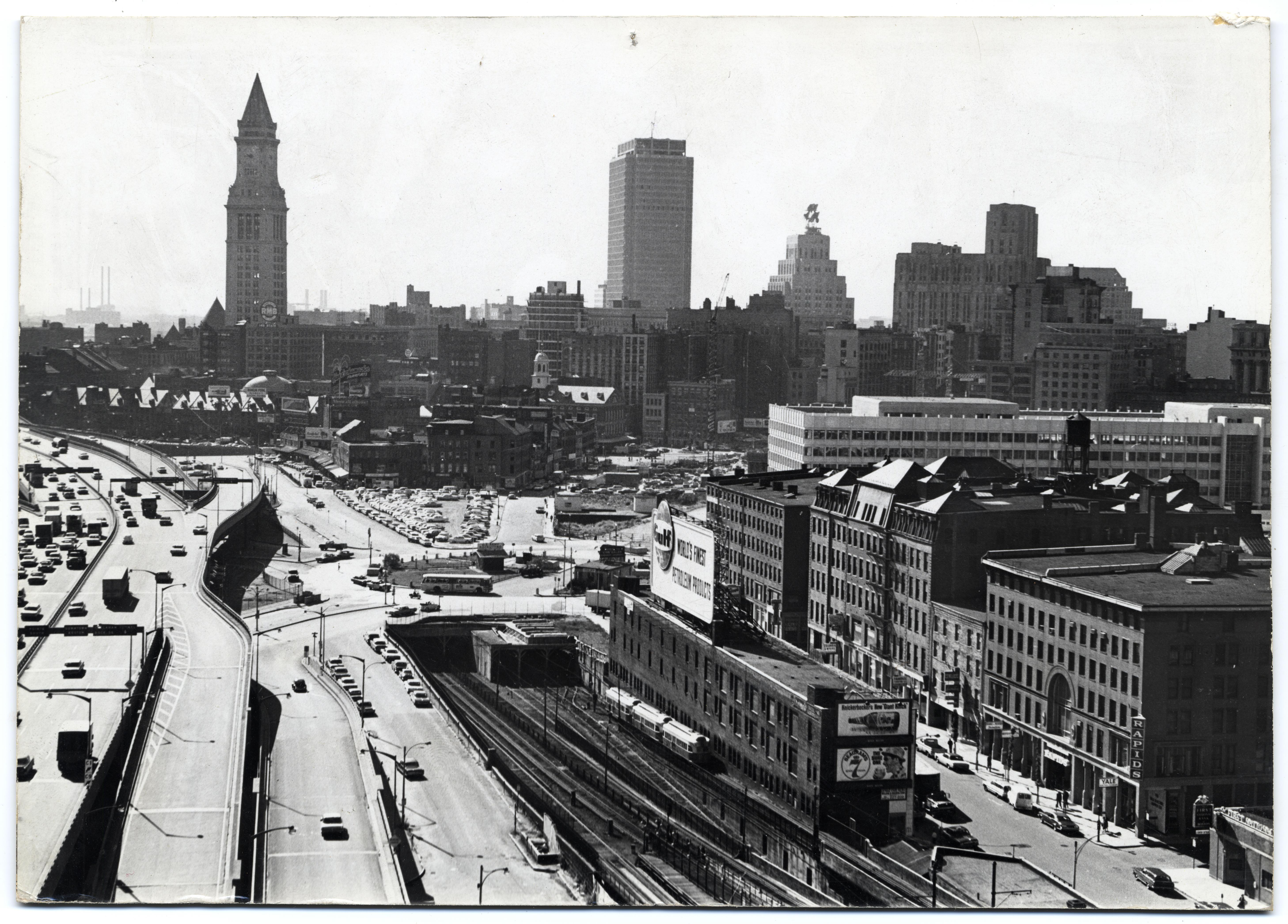
Late 1960s view from the north, with the elevated Central Artery at left. What remains of Haymarket Square is the traffic circle at the center.

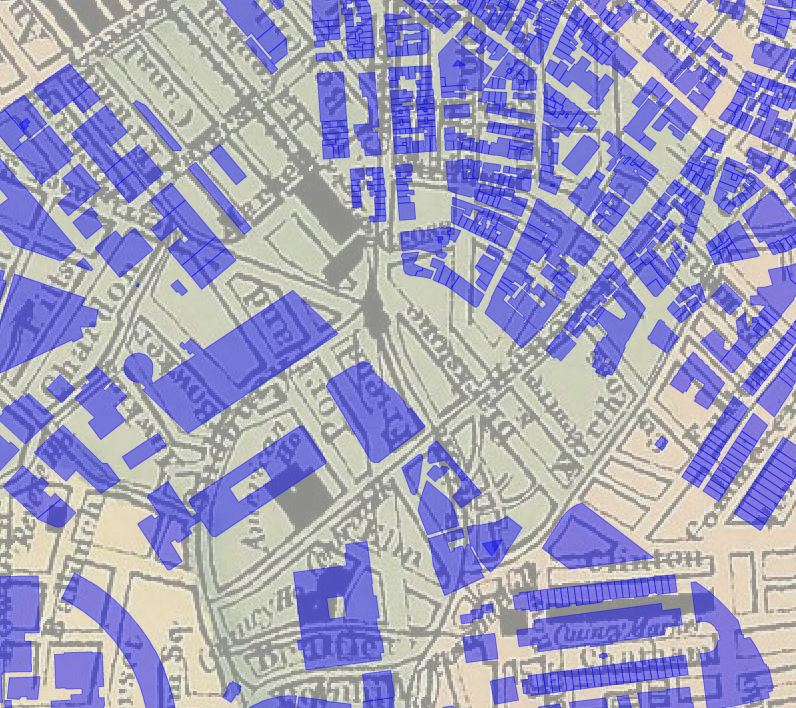
Approximate location of 2006 buildings overlaid on an 1881 map. No 1881 buildings remain.

== 21st century: further changes ==
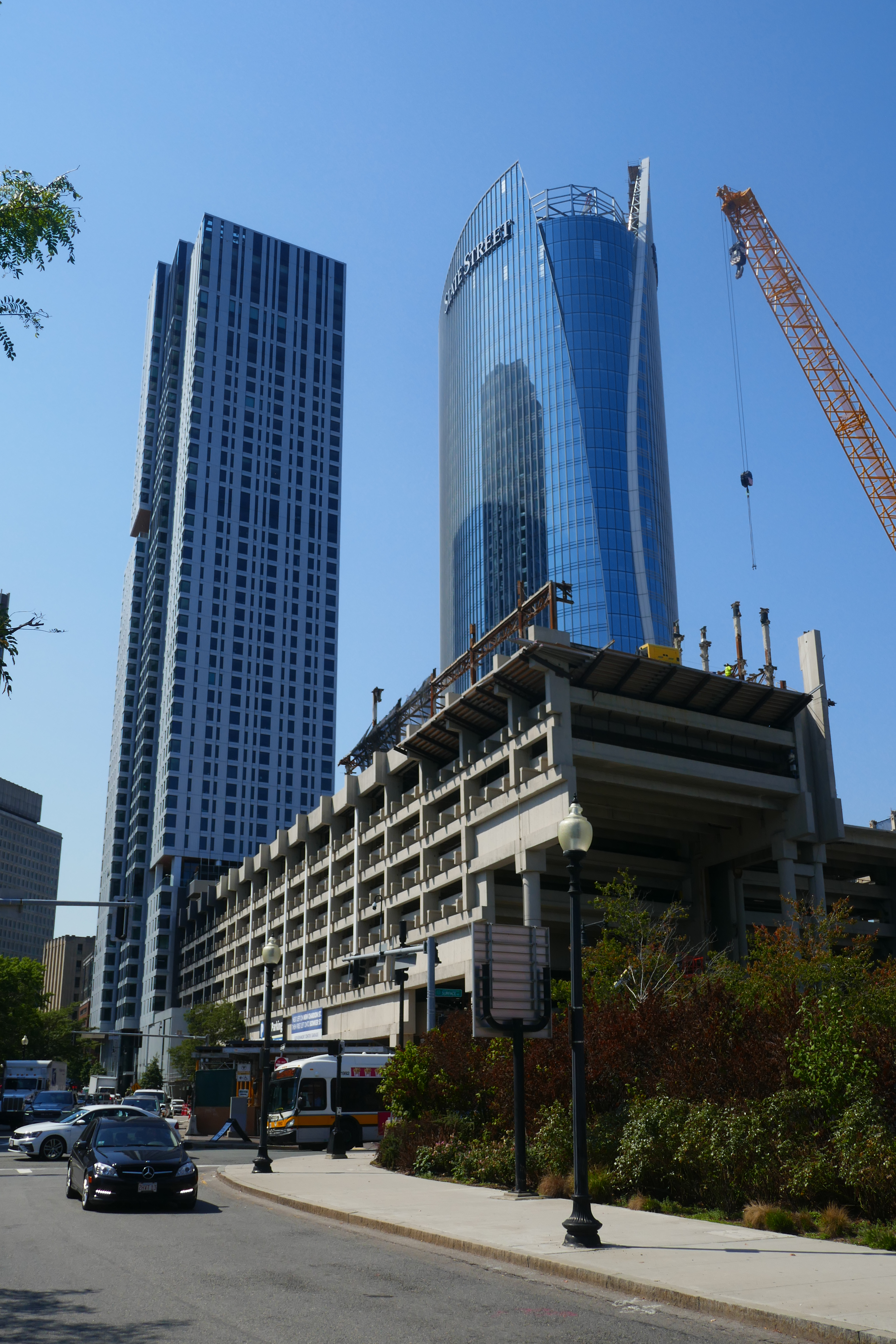
Bulfinch Crossing under construction in 2022

Construction began in January 2017 on Bulfinch Crossing, a 2.9 million square foot redevelopment on the site of the Government Center Garage. The northeast corner of the garage is at the location of Haymarket Square.

"Haymarket Square" was the original name of a hotel and market building which began construction in 2018 on Blackstone Street, a block south of the historic location of Haymarket Square. The hotel's name was later changed to the "Canopy by Hilton Boston Downtown". The hotel opened in 2022.
