= Boston Public Market =

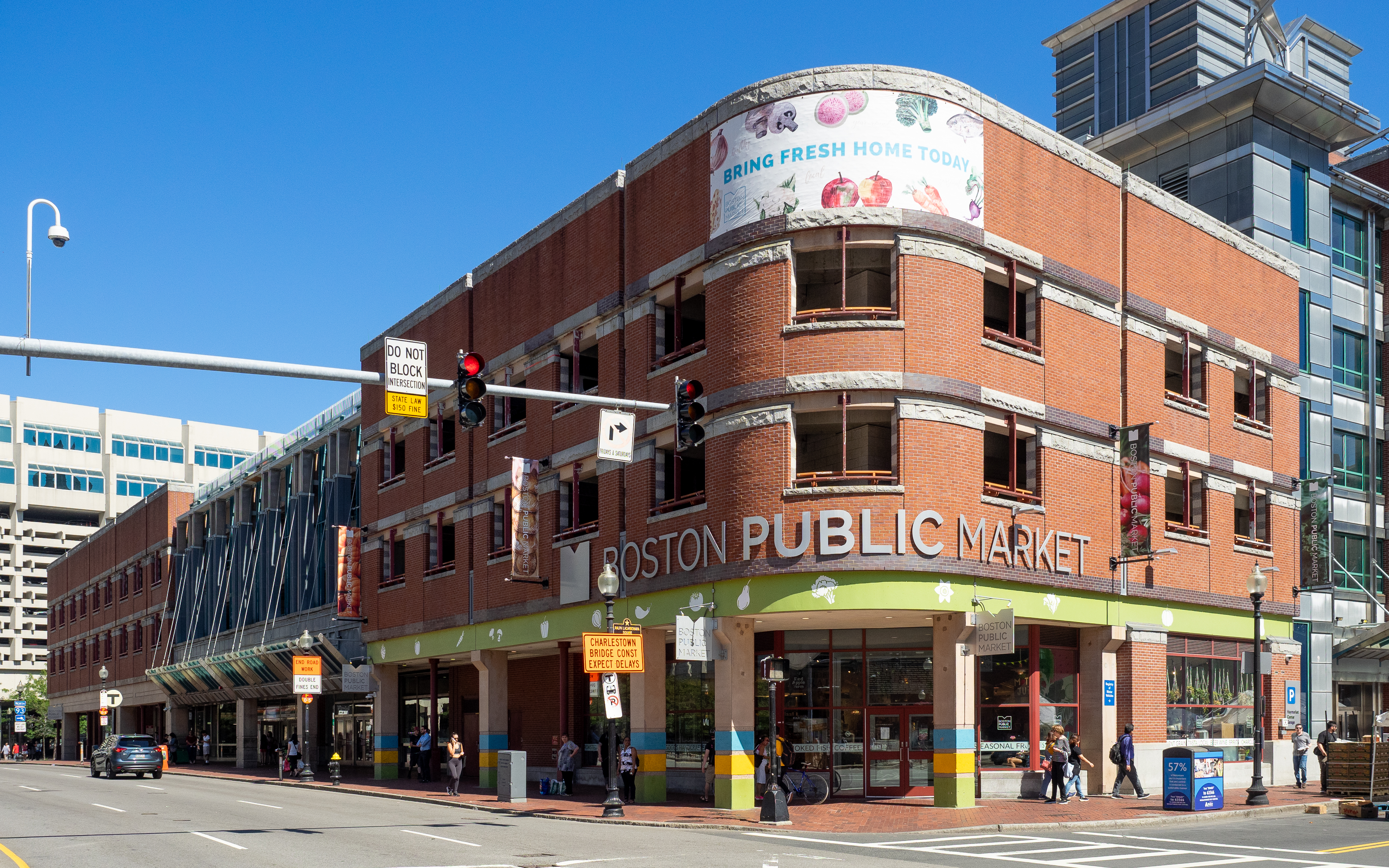
- Main entrance to the Boston Public Market

General information
- Location: 100 Hanover Street, Boston, Massachusetts, United States
- Coordinates: 42.362039°N 71.056895°W
- Opened: 2015

Dimensions
- Other dimensions: 28,000 square feet retail space

Design and construction
- Architects: Arrowstreet (building) and Architerra (market)

Other information
- Parking: 325 spaces

Website
- https://bostonpublicmarket.org/

The Boston Public Market is an indoor public market that opened in July 2015 in downtown Boston, adjacent to the Rose Fitzgerald Kennedy Greenway. The market houses more than 28 year-round vendor stalls, and is open seven days a week. Vendors for the indoor market are selected by the operator, the non-profit Boston Public Market Association, and must sell food and other products that are produced or originate in New England, as well as a limited amount of certain produce that is not able to grow in New England. The market was the first in the United States with an all-local-food requirement. The association operates a second seasonal outdoor farmers' market in Dewey Square, near the southern end of the Greenway.

== Building ==
The market occupies most of the ground floor of a mixed use building constructed as part of the Big Dig highway and tunnel project. The building, on a site known as Parcel 7, also includes ventilation towers for the underground highway, a portion of the Haymarket Station of the MBTA Green and Orange lines, the Haymarket Center Garage, and office space occupied by the Massachusetts Registry of Motor Vehicles. The building's architect was Arrowstreet.

== Market District ==
Markets have been in operation in this part of Boston at least since 1743, when a market opened on the ground floor of the new Faneuil Hall. The three buildings of Quincy Market were added in 1826 and became the Faneuil Hall Marketplace in the 1970s.

Street vendors have sold fruit, vegetables, and other products in the area since about 1830. The street vendors now operate as Haymarket, which consists of temporary stalls on Blackstone and Hanover Streets on Fridays and Saturdays year round, and which is managed by the Haymarket Pushcart Association.

In 2009, the Project for Public Spaces released a "Boston Market District Feasibility Study" commissioned by the Boston Redevelopment Authority (BRA). The proposed district would encompass the Parcel 7 market, a market on the ground floor of a building to be built on the adjacent Parcel 9, Haymarket, and the Faneuil Hall Marketplace.

== History ==
The site that eventually became Parcel 7 was cleared of its former buildings as part of the construction of Government Center in the 1960s. A map in the 1964 Government Center Redevelopment Plan shows that a hotel was planned to be built on the site, but the hotel was never built. A 1969 aerial photo shows the site being used for parking. In 1987, a 19-story hotel and office building was proposed for the site; it was never built.

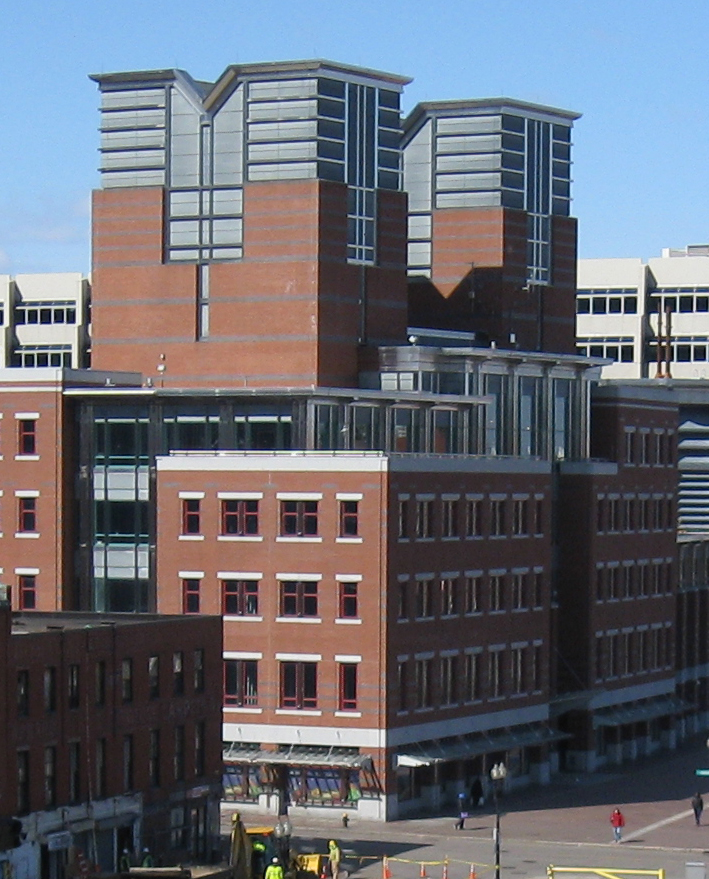
Parcel 7 building before construction of the market

The land continued to be used for parking until construction of the Tip O'Neill Tunnel began in the early 1990s as part of the Big Dig, when the mixed use structure was built on Parcel 7. As a mitigation measure for the loss of this parking lot and other nearby parking, the Parcel 7 garage offers low-cost validated parking to customers of local merchants.

The expansion of the Haymarket MBTA station into the basement of the building was completed in 2000. The parking garage opened for public use in 2001. The Big Dig ventilation equipment in building was put into use when the tunnel opened in 2003. Fit-out of the office space for use by the Massachusetts Turnpike Authority was halted in 2006 following the resignation of Turnpike Chairman Matthew Amorello.

In 2008, the Massachusetts General Court passed an environmental bond authorization that provided "that not less than $10,000,000 shall be expended to establish a program to facilitate the creation of a general public market in Boston to provide local agricultural, seafood and aquaculture, dairy and specialty foods produced in the commonwealth".

In 2009, the Massachusetts Department of Transportation issued a request for proposals from developers to lease the office space, garage, and ground floor market in the Parcel 7 building. Two bids were received, but the state rejected both bids. State officials said neither bid provided high enough lease payments.

The state subsequently decided to keep the office space for state agency use, to retain control over the parking garage, and to seek an operator for the ground floor market. The Massachusetts Registry of Motor Vehicles moved into the office space in 2014.

In 2011, the state Department of Agricultural Resources commissioned the Project for Public Spaces to develop an implementation plan for a market in the building. Later the same year, the department issued a Request for Proposals for the development and operation of a "Public Food Market." The bid submitted by the Boston Public Market Association was the only one submitted to the state. The Association was awarded the project in March 2012.

In 2014, the Boston Public Market Association submitted to the BRA its plans for the market, which were developed by the firm Architerra. The BRA approved the plans in April 2014, and construction began later in the year. The market opened in July 2015.

The estimated construction cost of $15 million was funded with $6 million in grants to the market from the 2008 state bond authorization, $6 million in private donations, and a $3 million loan from The Conservation Fund.

The market's first CEO was Liz Morningstar. She was succeeded by Cheryl Cronin in January 2016.

== Gallery ==
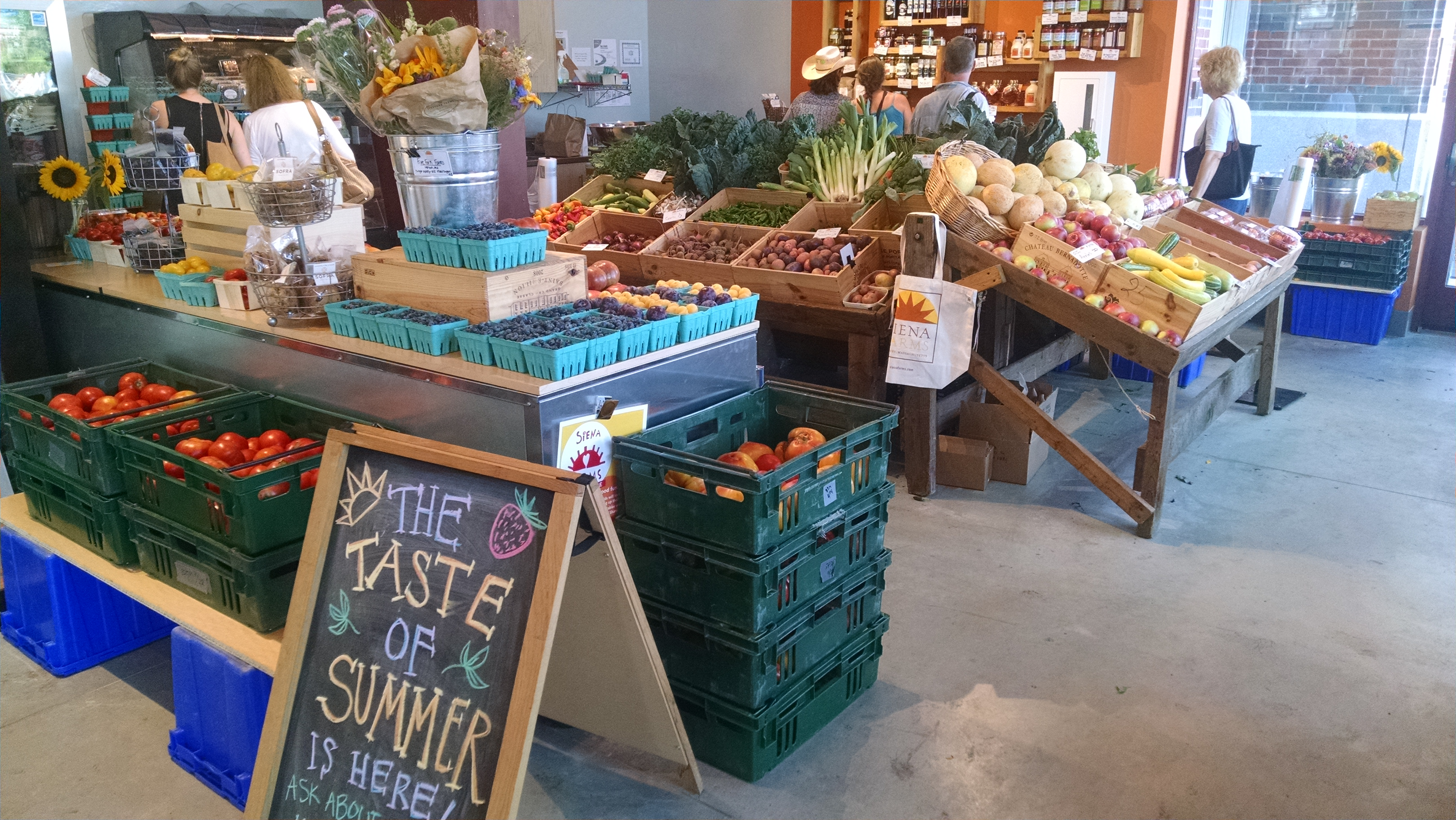
Siena Farms produce stand

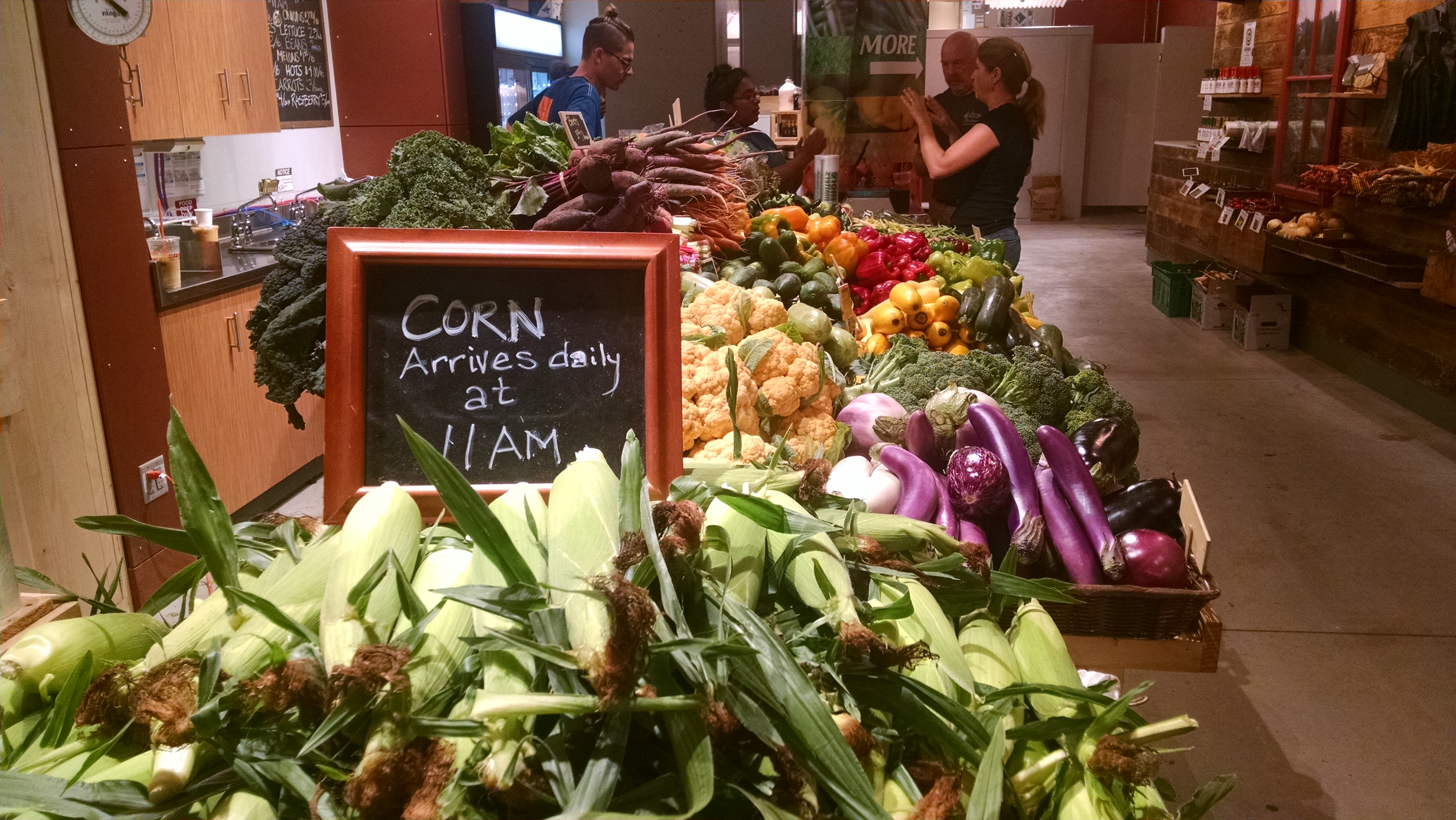
Corn for sale at Stillman's Farm booth

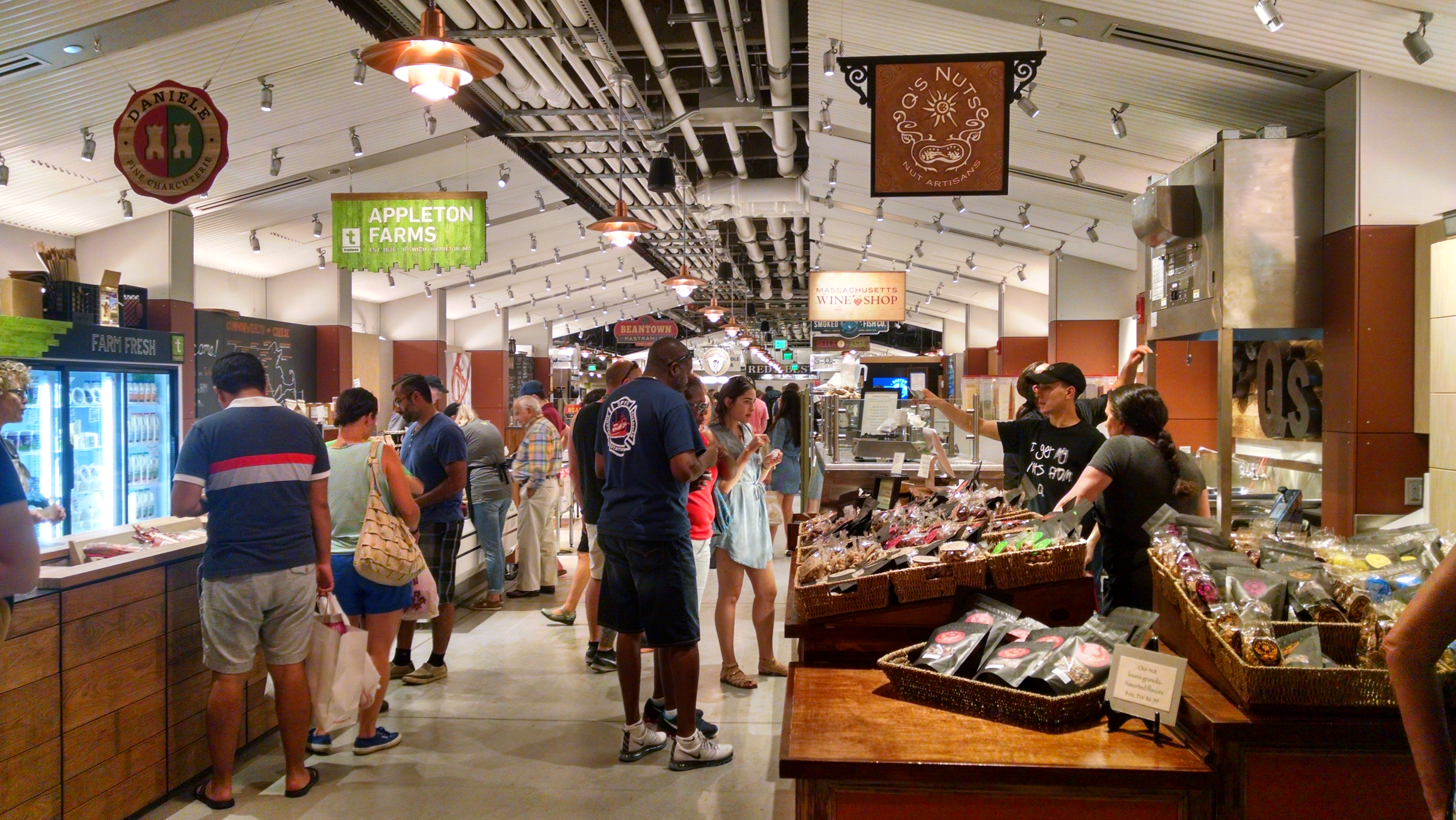
Q's Nuts and Appleton Farms

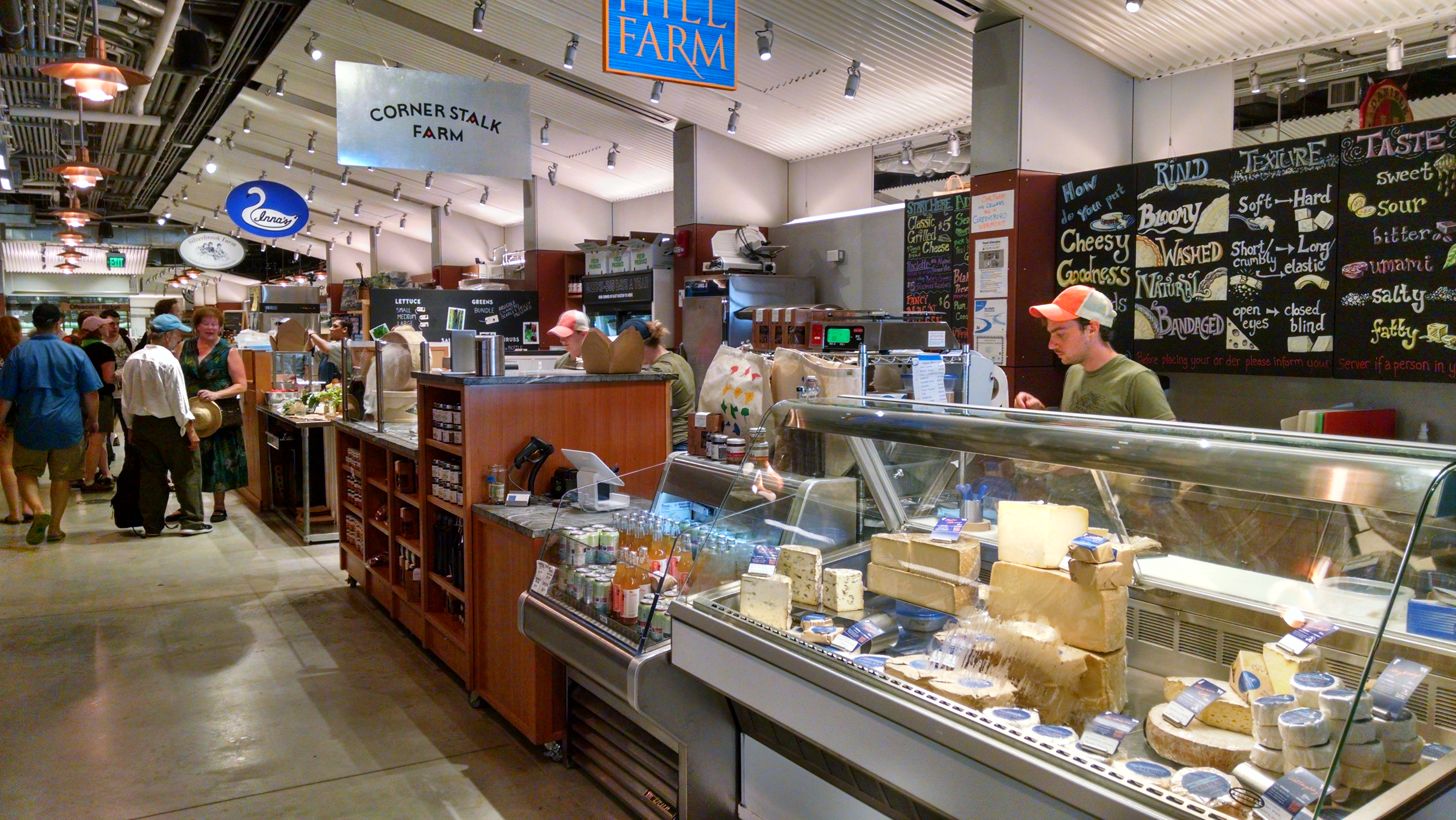
Cellars at Jasper Hill and Cornerstalk Farm

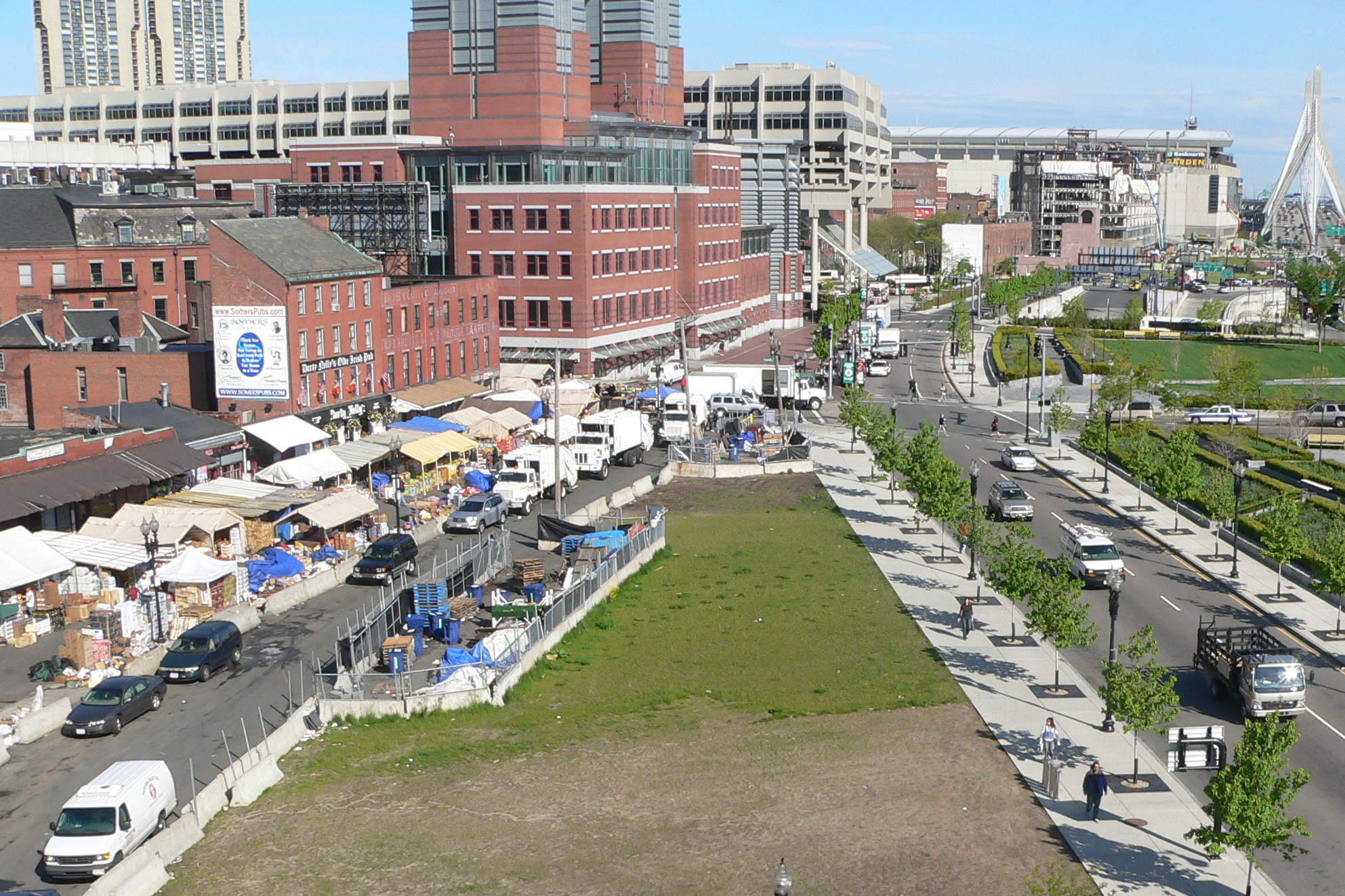
The Parcel 7 building, site of the Boston Public Market, is at top center. On the street at left is the Haymarket Pushcart Market. To the right are the North End Parks.

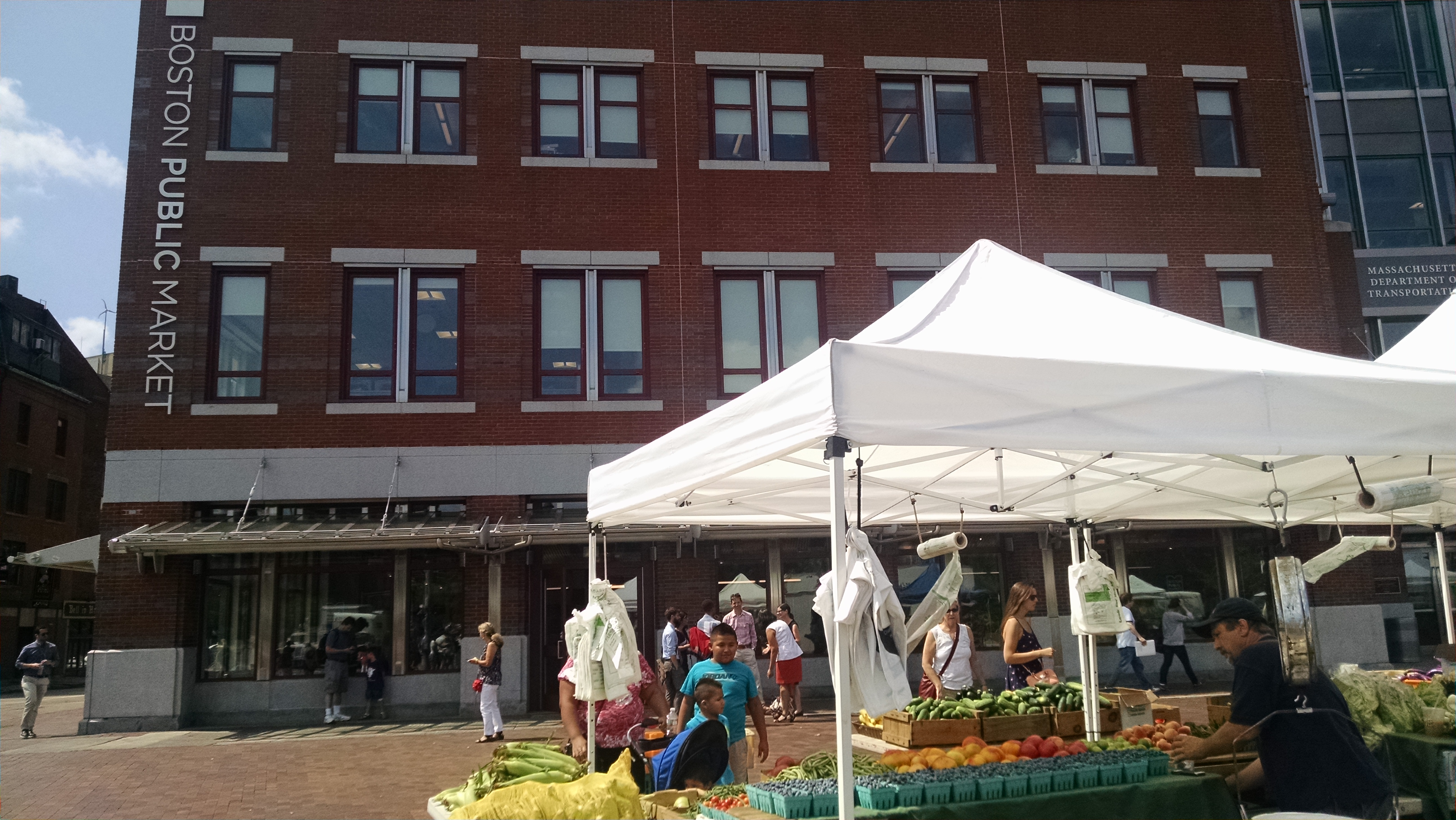
The twice-weekly farmers' market on the plaza adjacent to the building.

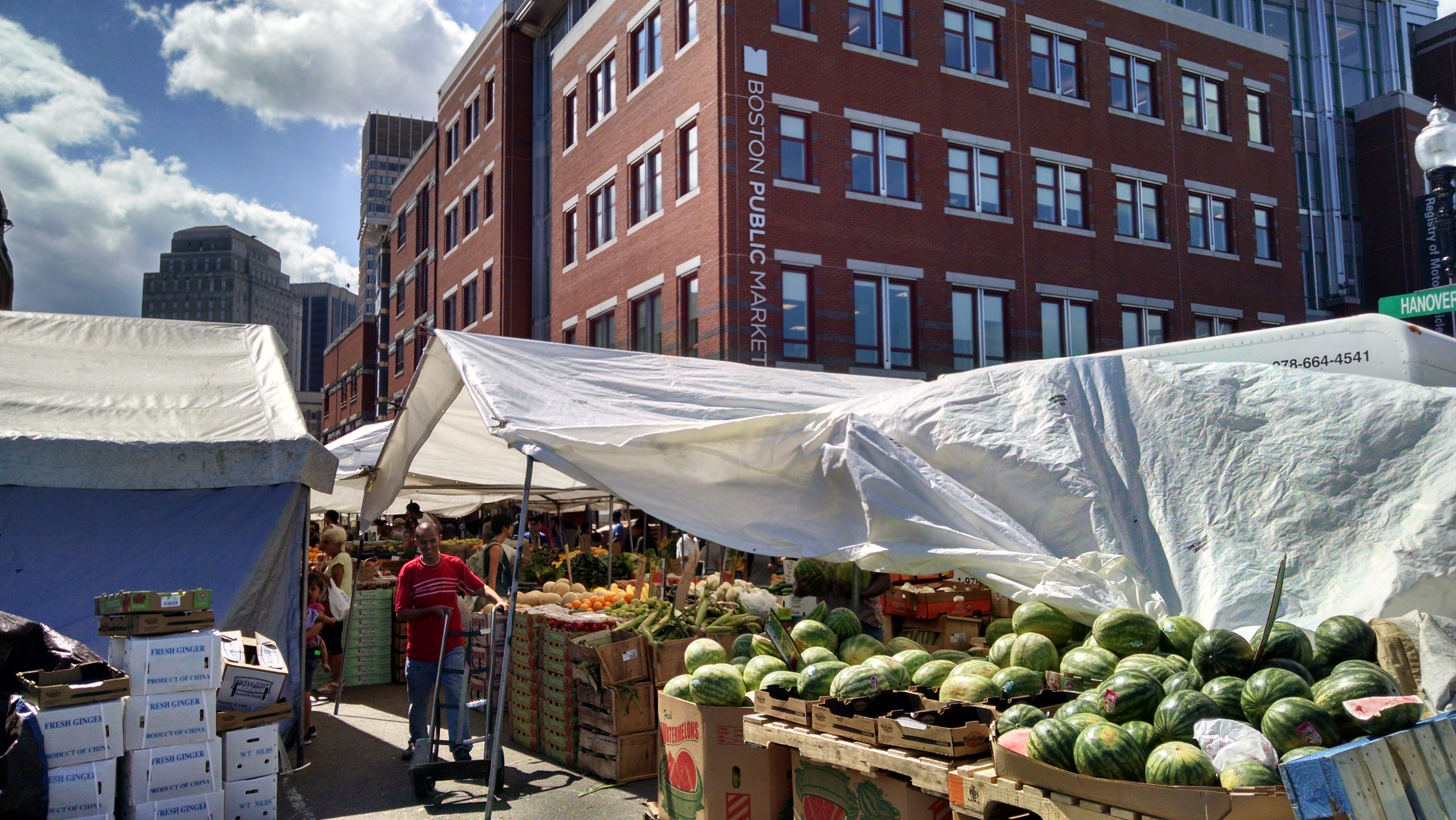
Each Friday and Saturday, vendors from the Haymarket Pushcart Association set up on Hanover Street next to the Boston Public Market.

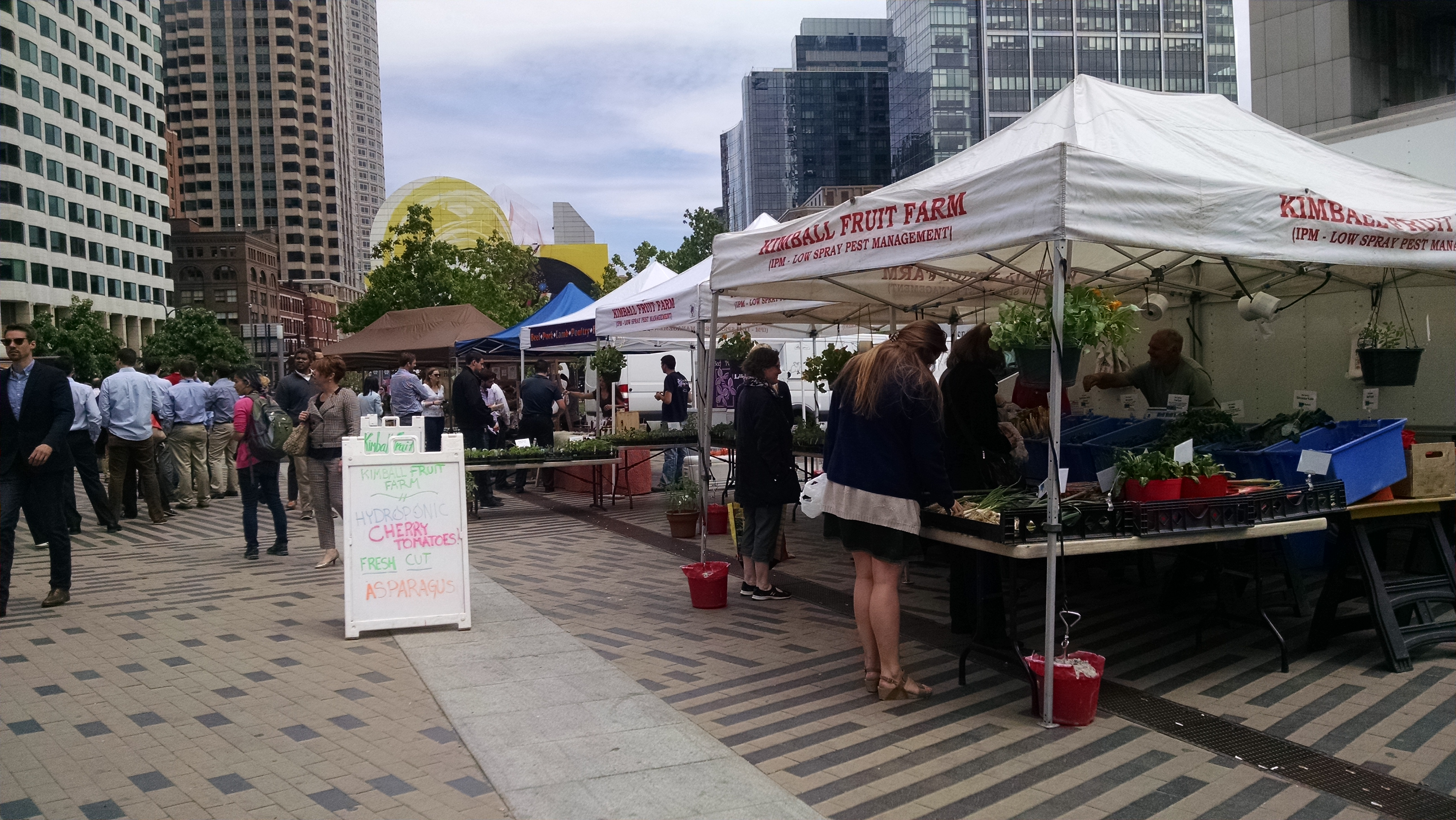
The Boston Public Market Association also operates a farmers' market in Dewey Square on the Rose Fitzgerald Kennedy Greenway.

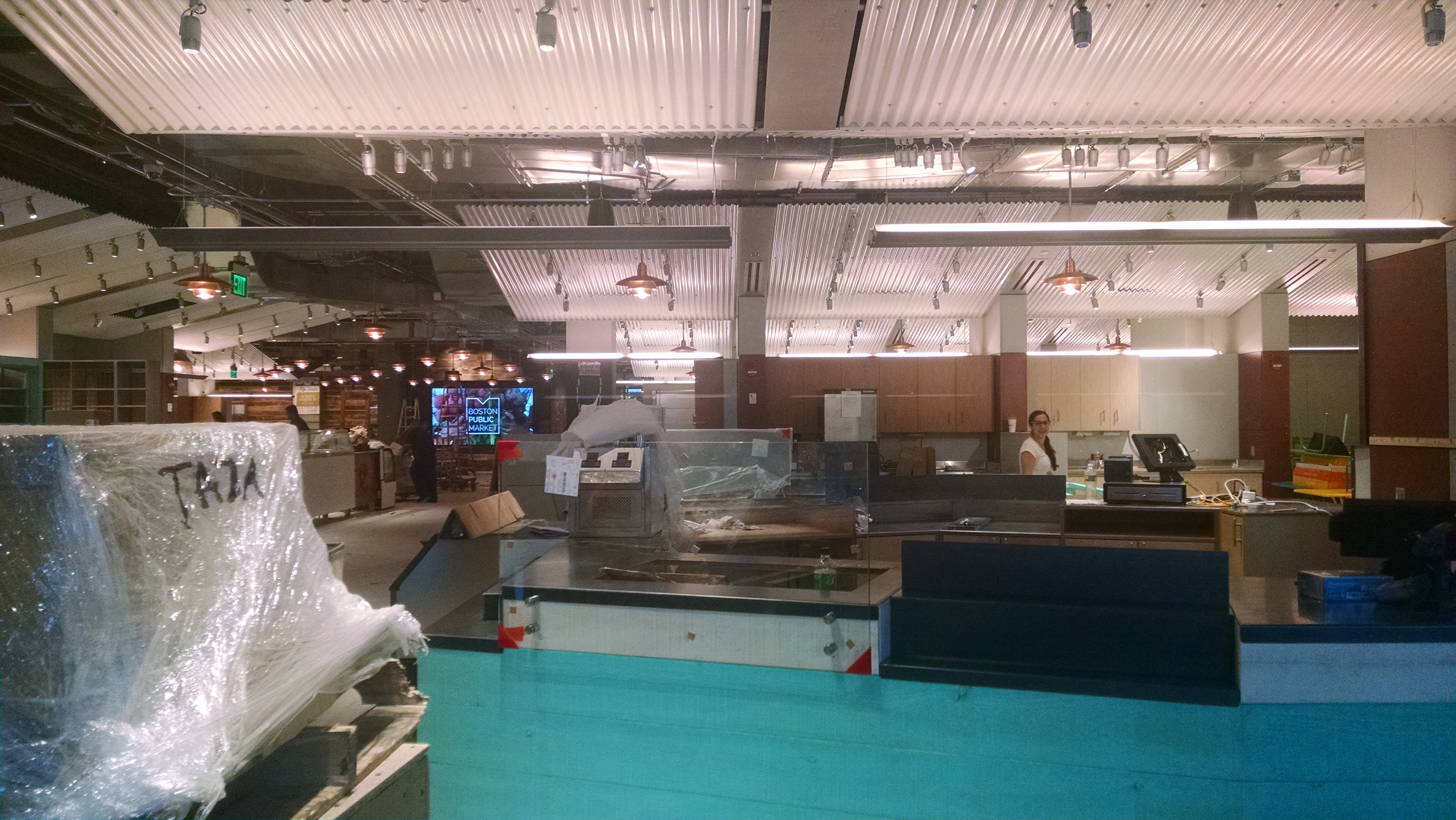
Inside the market a week before opening; view from Congress Street, July 23, 2015

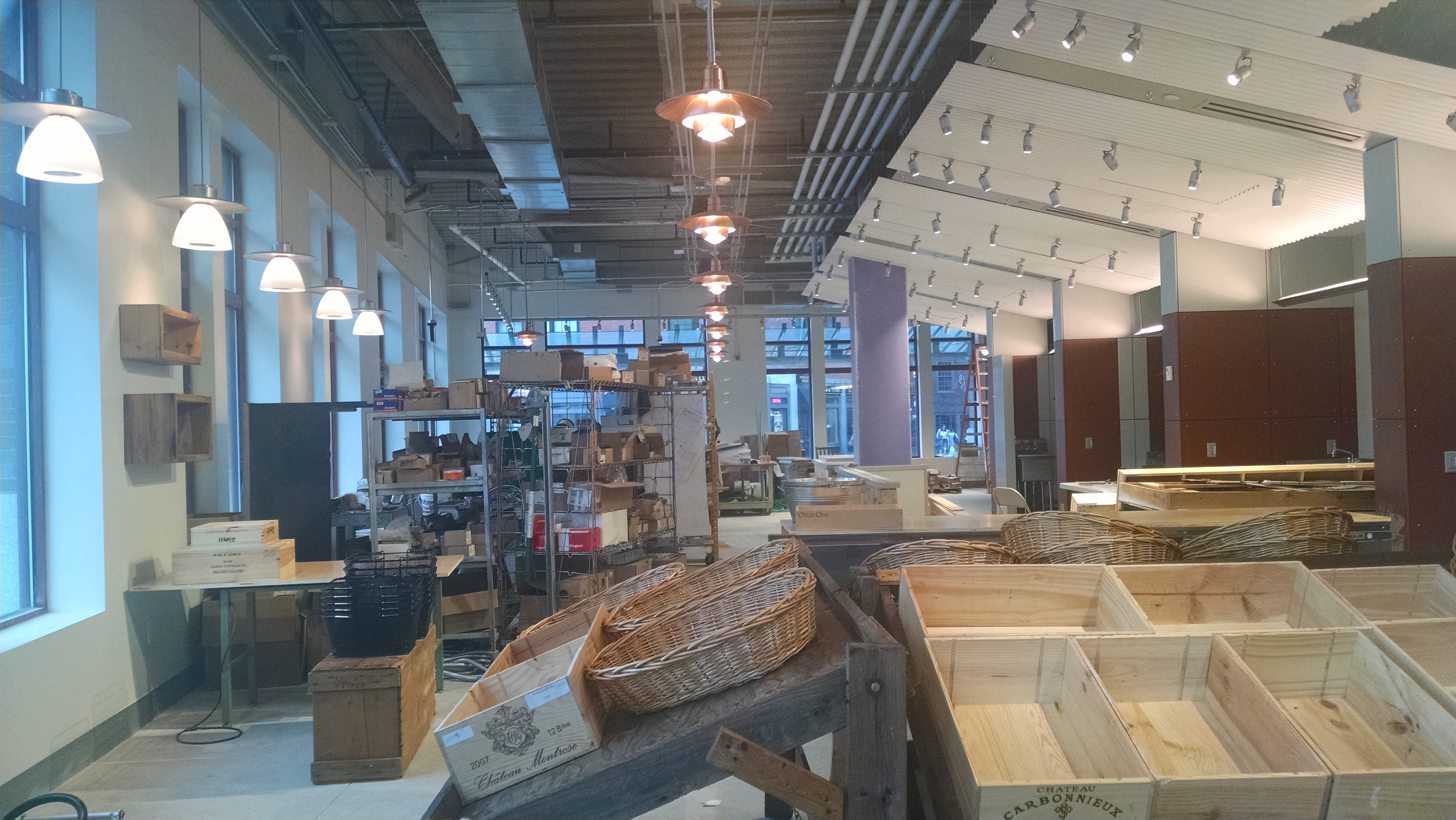
Inside the market a week before opening; view from Greenway, July 23, 2015

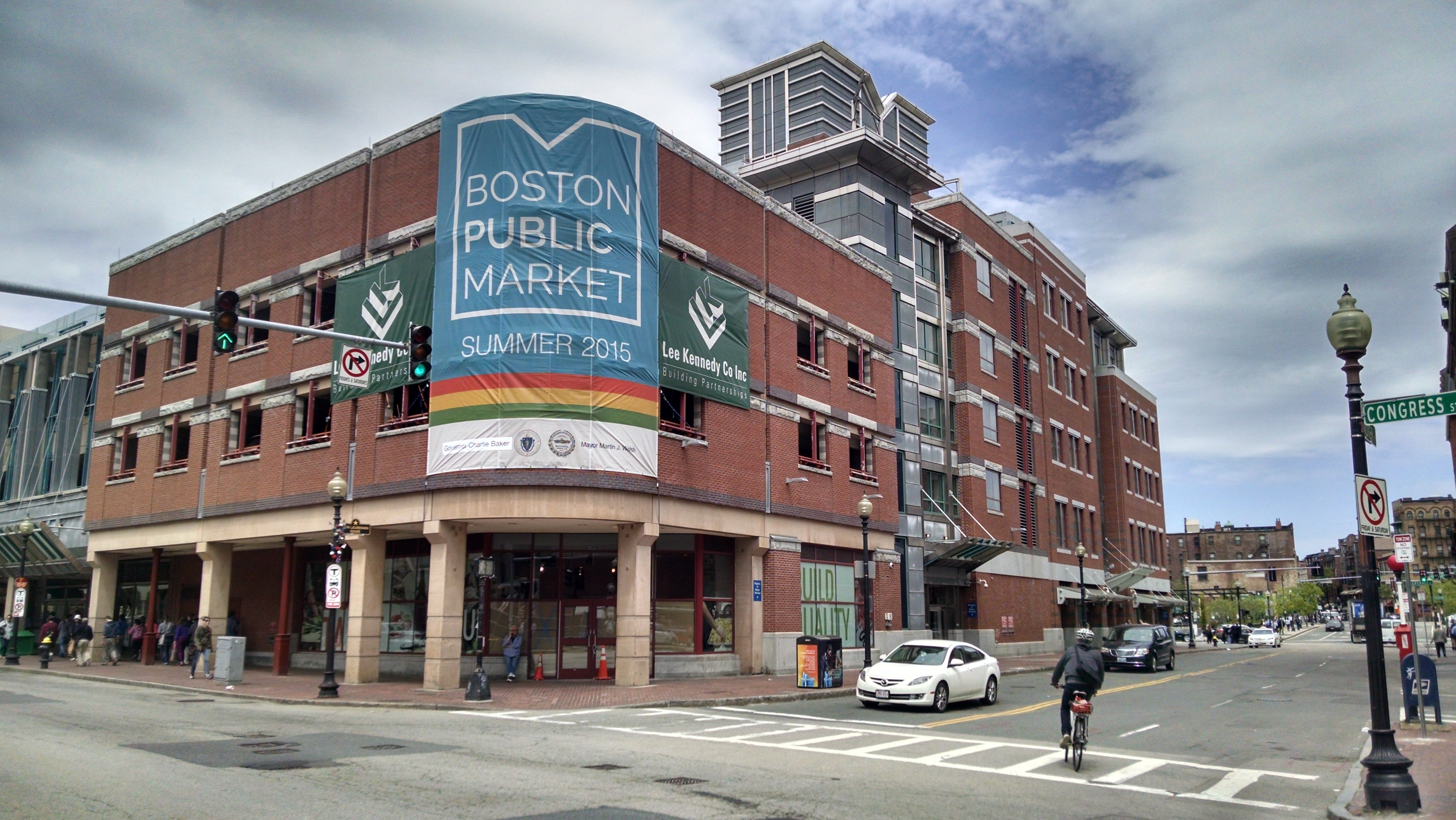
The market under construction, May 2015.

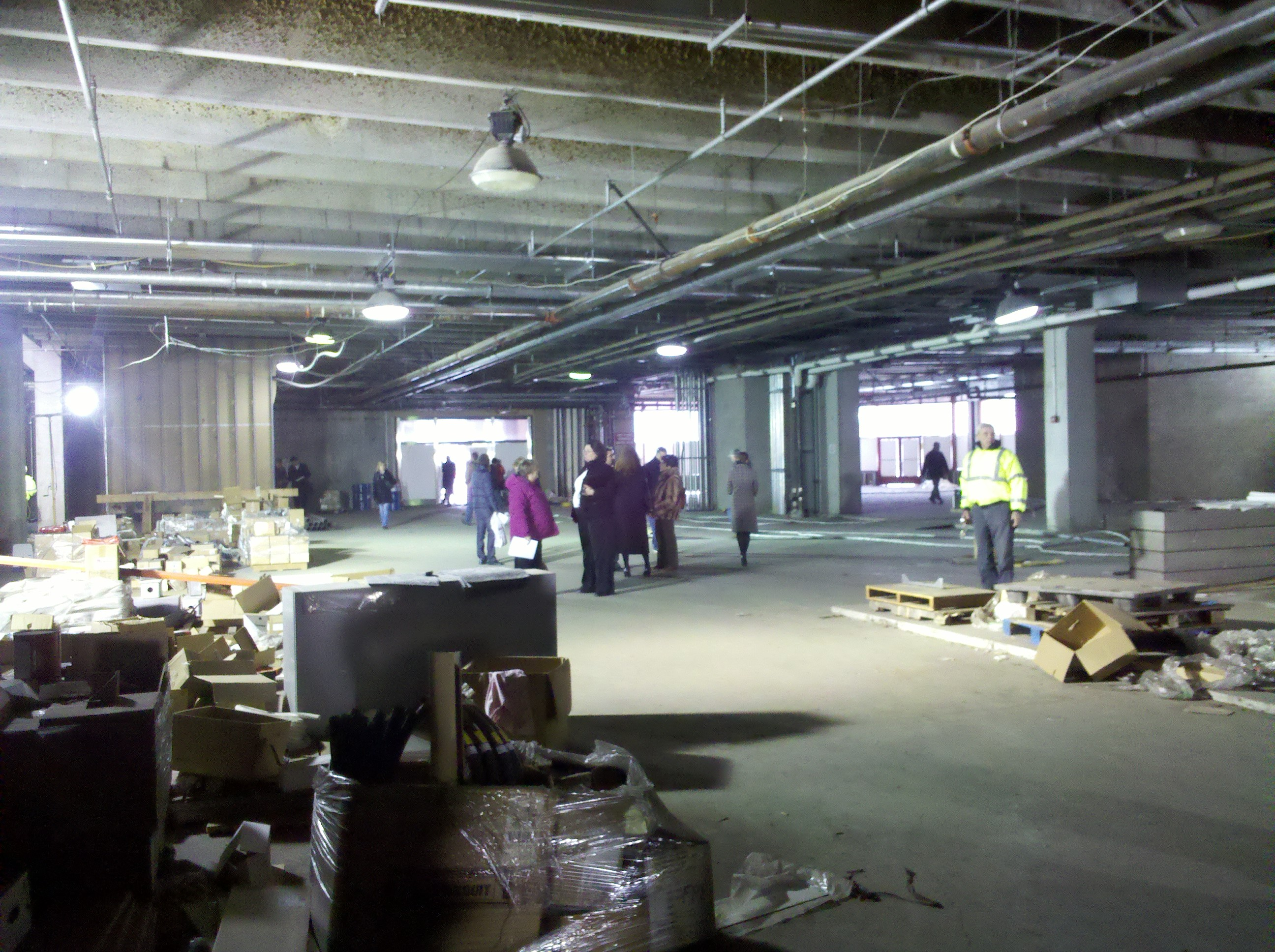
The ground floor of the Parcel 7 garage in 2011, several years before construction of the Boston Public Market began.
