= Shannon Nichol =

American landscape architect

- Education: University of Washington
- Occupation: Landscape architect

Shannon Nichol is an American landscape architect and founding principal of Gustafson Guthrie Nichol (GGN), located in Seattle. Nichol has led many of GGN's landscape design projects, including the designs for Boston's North End Parks, Seattle's Bill & Melinda Gates Foundation campus, and San Francisco's India Basin Shoreline. In 2018, she was elected a member of the National Academy of Design in the category "Architecture."

== Early life and education ==
Nichol was born in Arizona but grew up in the Cascade Range of Washington near Mount Baker. Her father was a systems engineer; her mother an artist and a naturalist. To earn money for college, Nichols worked a variety of jobs, including driving a combine harvester and washing barrels in a cannery.

While studying forestry and pre-engineering at the University of Washington, Nichol was inspired by an evening class with landscape architect Richard Haag. A departmental scholarship enabled her to spend some time at the University of Liverpool. She earned a Bachelor of Landscape Architecture from University of Washington in 1997.

== Career ==
Nichol's college internship led her to a job with the Seattle firm of Anderson and Ray. In 1997, landscape architect Kathryn Gustafson (whose partnership Gustafson Porter was based in Europe) invited Nichol to produce graphics for a competition to design a terrace for the American Museum of Natural History in New York City. When Gustafson's entry won the competition, Nichol, still employed at Anderson & Ray, began collaborating with Gustafson.

In 1999, after three years of collaborating, Nichol and Jennifer Guthrie (her colleague at Anderson & Ray) started a firm in Seattle, inviting Gustafson to join them in a Seattle-based partnership. Each of the three contributed $7000 to the project. The firm's name was initially "Gustafson Partners" (to benefit from Gustafson's name recognition) but was later changed to "Gustafson Guthrie Nichol" (GGN.) The agreement was that Guthrie and Nichol would run the Seattle partnership, while Gustafson continued her European practice and participated as a "visiting fireman."

Nichol leads many of GGN's national projects. In 1999, together with Kathryn Gustafson, she created the winning proposal for Lurie Garden at Millennium Park in Chicago, Illinois. Nichol and her partners focused on using native midwestern plant material that was a part of Chicago's historic identity. The decision to recreate the native Prairie that once dominated the Chicago area led to the inclusion of garden designer Piet Oudolf, in what was his first North American project. The project won several awards, including a General Design Award of Excellence from the ASLA.

Nichol served as design lead for GGN on Boston's North End Parks, two parcels of the Rose Kennedy Greenway adjacent to Boston's North End created between 2003 and 2007. GGN collaborated on the project with Boston design firm Crosby, Schlessinger, Smallridge. The parks were created on land reclaimed from Boston's Big Dig, which Boston zoning required "should be programmed, designed, and detailed for the primary benefit of the adjacent North End community through the development of a series of spaces which invite both residents and visitors to use the park while clearly delineating a neighborhood presence and oversight of the park." According to The Landscape Architect's Guide to Boston, the North End Parks provide the North End with "both a contemporary garden space and a gateway to the downtown areas of Government Center and Haymarket Square." The North End Parks project earned the 2012 Tucker Design Award.

Nichol also served as landscape design lead on the Bill & Melinda Gates Foundation Campus project, completed in 2011, in collaboration with the architecture firm NBBJ. The campus masterplan won a 2014 ASLA Award of Excellence in General Design as well as a 2014 Merit Award in General Design from the Washington ASLA.

In 2016, the San Francisco Parks Alliance and Build Inc. sponsored a competition to design a public 7.5-acre park on the India Basin Shoreline. A concept design by Nichol won the competition for GGN. The proposal focused on a softened shoreline and connections to the existing neighborhood. As of 2019, San Francisco's India Basin Mixed-Use Project was still in planning stages.

Nichol became active in AIA Seattle and other design and architecture organizations, based on her collaborations with architects on urban projects. In 2005, Nichol was named an honorary member of the American Institute of Architects (AIA). In 2014, she was made a Fellow of the American Society of Landscape Architects. In 2018, she was elected a member of the National Academy of Design in the category "Architecture."

Nichol held the Herb and DeeDee Glimcher Distinguished Visiting Professorship from 2014- 2015 at The Ohio State University.

== Projects ==
- Lurie Garden (Chicago) (2000-2004)
- Bill & Melinda Gates Foundation Campus (Seattle)
- North End Parks (Boston) (2003-2007)
- Lower Rainier Vista & Pedestrian Land Bridge (Seattle)
- Gardens at the National Museum of African American History and Culture (Washington, D.C.)
- India Basin Shoreline Park (San Francisco)
- Burke Museum at the University of Washington (Seattle)

== Publications ==
- GGN: Landscapes 1999–2018. Thaïsa Way, Jennifer Guthrie, Kathryn Gustafson, Shannon Nichol, Rodrigo Abela. Portland, Timber Press: 2018.
- Shannon Nichol, David Malda, and Keith McPeters, "The Analogue Version" in Representing Landscapes: Analogue, edited by Nadia Amoroso. Routledge, 214–226.
