= The Boston Museum =

Proposed history museum in Boston, Massachusetts

The Boston Museum logo

The Boston Museum was a proposed history museum for the city of Boston, Massachusetts. The museum had chosen a nickname, "BoMu", before it was terminated.

== Theme ==
The museum proposed to bring the region's 400-year history into focus, inspiring local residents and visitors from across the globe to explore Boston's rich heritage, historic sites and cultural attractions. A 100,000-square-foot (9,300 m^{2}) museum and marketplace concept was in development, with additional plans for a low-lying pedestrian bridge to serve as a gateway to the museum and a critical connector of park parcels along the Rose Kennedy Greenway. The proposal included five core exhibition galleries, a gallery for national touring exhibitions, an all-purpose theater space, educational spaces, a City Room, a ground-floor marketplace, and a green roof.

=== Educational mission ===
The Boston Museum planned to broaden and deepen the appreciation of Boston as a "living classroom" and campus for thematic learning through partnerships with other historic sites and cultural institutions, sharing best practices and working in concert to create new programming and enrichment activities for educators and students throughout the region. It also hoped to reach out to national audiences through extensive use of electronic links and new media technology.

The Boston Museum planned to be a transformative educational experience for learners of all ages and styles. Its galleries would have used a wide variety of approaches aimed at engaging families, school children and adults at all stages of life. Most importantly, the stories visitors encountered would have had personal resonance, whether of ancestors arriving on Long Wharf or their own physical relationship to the place of Boston.

== Location ==
If designated by the Massachusetts Turnpike Authority, the museum would have been built on Parcel 9 in Downtown Boston, adjacent to the Rose Kennedy Greenway, Faneuil Hall, the Quincy Market, and abutting from the downtown Haymarket. The Boston Museum would have built a pedestrian bridge on Parcel 12, which would have directly connected the Greenway to the museum. In October 2005 the Massachusetts Turnpike Authority designated the project as the official developer for Parcel 12.

== Structure ==
The planned building was to have been designed by Cambridge Seven Associates. Since beginning in approximately March 2010, Rose Kennedy Greenway planners believed the Greenway was better suited for natural attractions than for large buildings, Boston Museum planners, including CEO Frank Keefe began looking for another location off the Greenway.

The original planned building was designed by Moshe Safdie and Associates and was estimated to cost $124 million. The proposal included exhibition galleries, theater spaces, a series of education and meeting rooms, a grand hall for large public meetings and a grand concourse. The building would also have featured restaurants and an information center, as well as green space. The Safdie Proposal was superseded by a new plan calling for a different design due to Parcel 12 site conditions. The need to build over two highway ramps would have added such additional cost that the Boston Museum Project sought permission to construct a smaller alternate project on Parcel 9 "The Haymarket". Parcel 12 would then have been used as the site of a sculptural bridge leading pedestrian traffic across to be able to enter the museum or walk on toward North Station.

=== Core galleries ===
- Place Over Time would have told the story of the ecological and economic transformation of Massachusetts.
- Conscience and Confrontation would have explored the periodic eruption of political contention ruling Massachusetts, which has often set an agenda for political change across the nation and the globe.
- People of the Bay would have explored the succession of cultures, from native peoples through the latest wave of immigrants, as they created personal, family, community, and inter-group experiences in this region.
- Innovation Odyssey would have focused on the region's many breakthroughs and “firsts” that have had a global reach, spreading liberty and the abolition of slavery, advancing the causes of universal education and expanded health care, igniting both the Industrial Revolution and the Information Age.
- Sports Town was envisioned as an entry point for visitors who might not see themselves as typical museum-goers. They would have been drawn into the gallery - and the museum beyond - because exhibit content would have related to their lifelong passion of sports, which had many "firsts" is Massachusetts.

== Termination ==
In November 2012, the Massachusetts Department of Transportation rejected the Boston Museum's bid to be designated as the developer of Parcel 9, adjacent to the Rose Kennedy Greenway, a site created by the Big Dig highway construction project.

In January 2013, the Board of the Boston Museum voted to terminate its efforts to build a museum and to disband the organization.

== People involved ==
=== Board of directors ===
- Louis Miller - Boston Museum Board Chairman; Rackemann, Sawyer & Brewster
- Roger Berkowitz - President and CEO, Legal Sea Foods
- Janey Bishoff - Bishoff Communications
- Janice Bourque
- William M. Bulger - President Emeritus, University of Massachusetts
- Jill Ker Conway - President Emerita, Smith College
- Ralph Cooper - Veterans Benefits Clearinghouse
- Callie Crossley - WGBH Commentator
- Anne D. Emerson - President Emerita, Boston Museum
- David Feigenbaum - Senior Principal, Fish & Richardson
- John Fish - CEO, Suffolk Construction
- Ronald Lee Fleming - Founder, Townscape Institute
- Richard M. Freeland - Massachusetts Commissioner of Higher Education
- William Galatis - Dunkin' Brands Franchisee
- Perrin M. Grayson, Esq.
- Frank Keefe - CEO, Boston Museum
- Don Law - President, Live Nation - New England
- Alyce J. Lee
- Tunney Lee - Professor Emeritus, Senior Lecturer, MIT
- Kevin McCall - CEO, Paradigm Properties
- Jane Manopoli Patterson
- James E. Rooney - Massachusetts Convention Center Authority
- William B. Tyler - Chairman Emeritus - Board; Rackemann, Sawyer & Brewster
- James B. White - President Emeritus -Board; Elaw Corporation
- Linda Whitlock - Former Nicholas President & CEO, Boys and Girls Clubs of Boston
- J. David Wimberly - Chairman Emeritus, Frontier Capital Management

=== National Advisory Committee ===
- Lou Casagrande - Dean of Education, Social Work, Child Life and Family Studies, Wheelock College
- Spencer R. Crew - Executive Director and CEO, National Underground Railroad Freedom Center
- Drew Gilpin Faust - President, Harvard University
- Henry Louis Gates - Director, W.E.B. DuBois Institute, Harvard University
- David Gergen - Director, Center for Public Leadership, Harvard University
- Doris Kearns Goodwin - Historian/ Author
- Marian L. Heard - President and Chief Executive Officer, Oxen Hill Partners
- Michael Patrick MacDonald - Author/ Activist
- Thomas H. O'Connor - Professor Emeritus/ University Historian, Boston College
- Nathaniel Philbrick - Author
- Robert D. Putnam - Peter and Isabel Malkin Professor of Public Policy, Harvard University
- Elizabeth Shannon - Writer/ Teacher/ Administrator, Boston University
- Cathy Douglas Stone, Esq.
- Margot Stern Strom - Executive Director, Facing History and Ourselves
- Andrew Viterbi - President, The Viterbi Group

=== Project consultants ===
- Richard Rabinowitz, Chief Historian
- Cambridge Seven Associates, Architecture
- Mikyoung Kim, Landscsape Architecture
- Boston History and Innovation Collaborative, Content for Innovation Gallery and other galleries
- ConsultEcon, Inc., Economic Feasibility Consultants
