= North End Parks =

Two parks in Boston, Massachusetts

Coordinates: 42°21′44.49″N 71°3′21.15″W

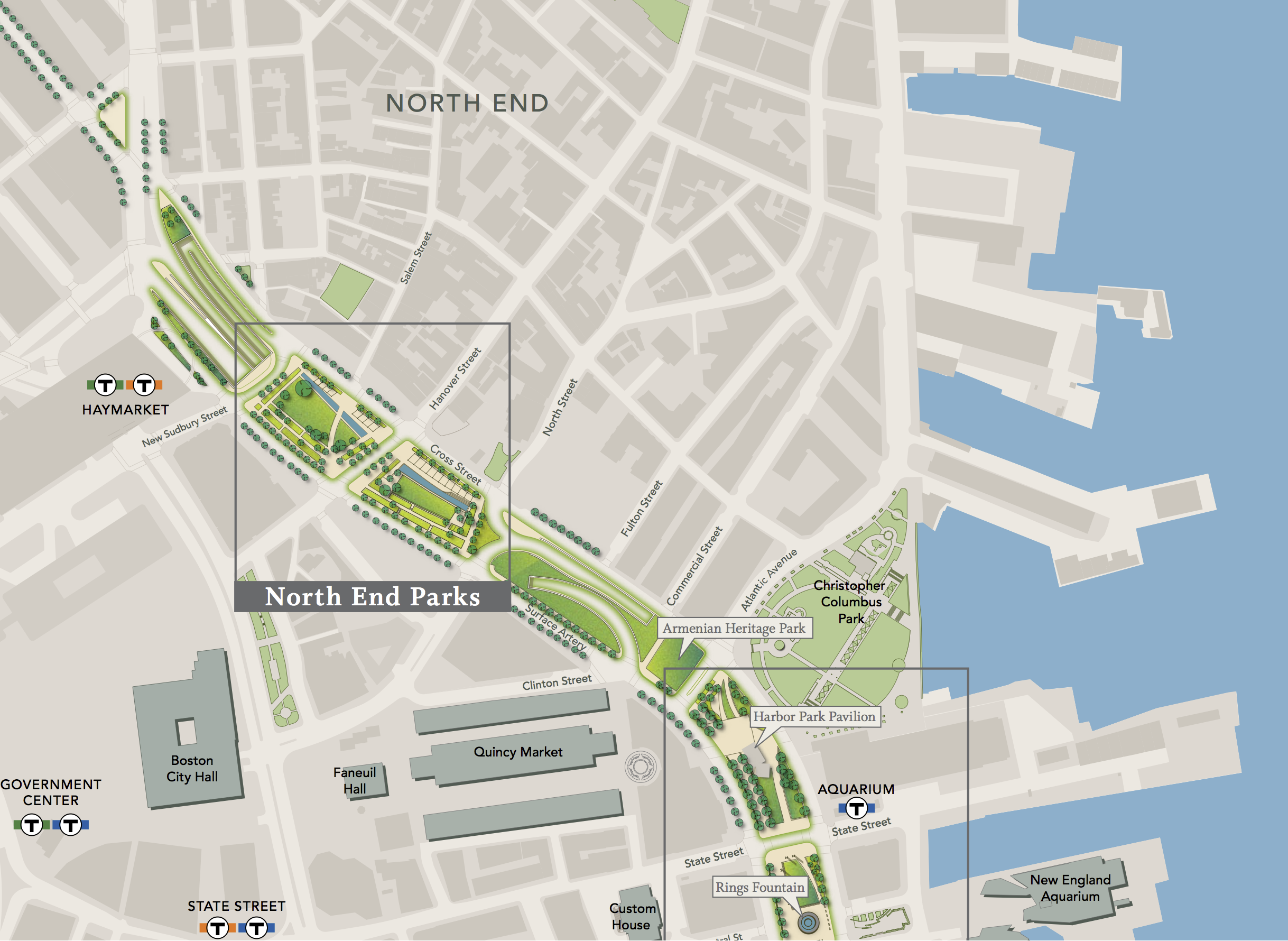
Rose Kennedy Greenway map detail showing location of North End Parks adjacent to Boston's North End.

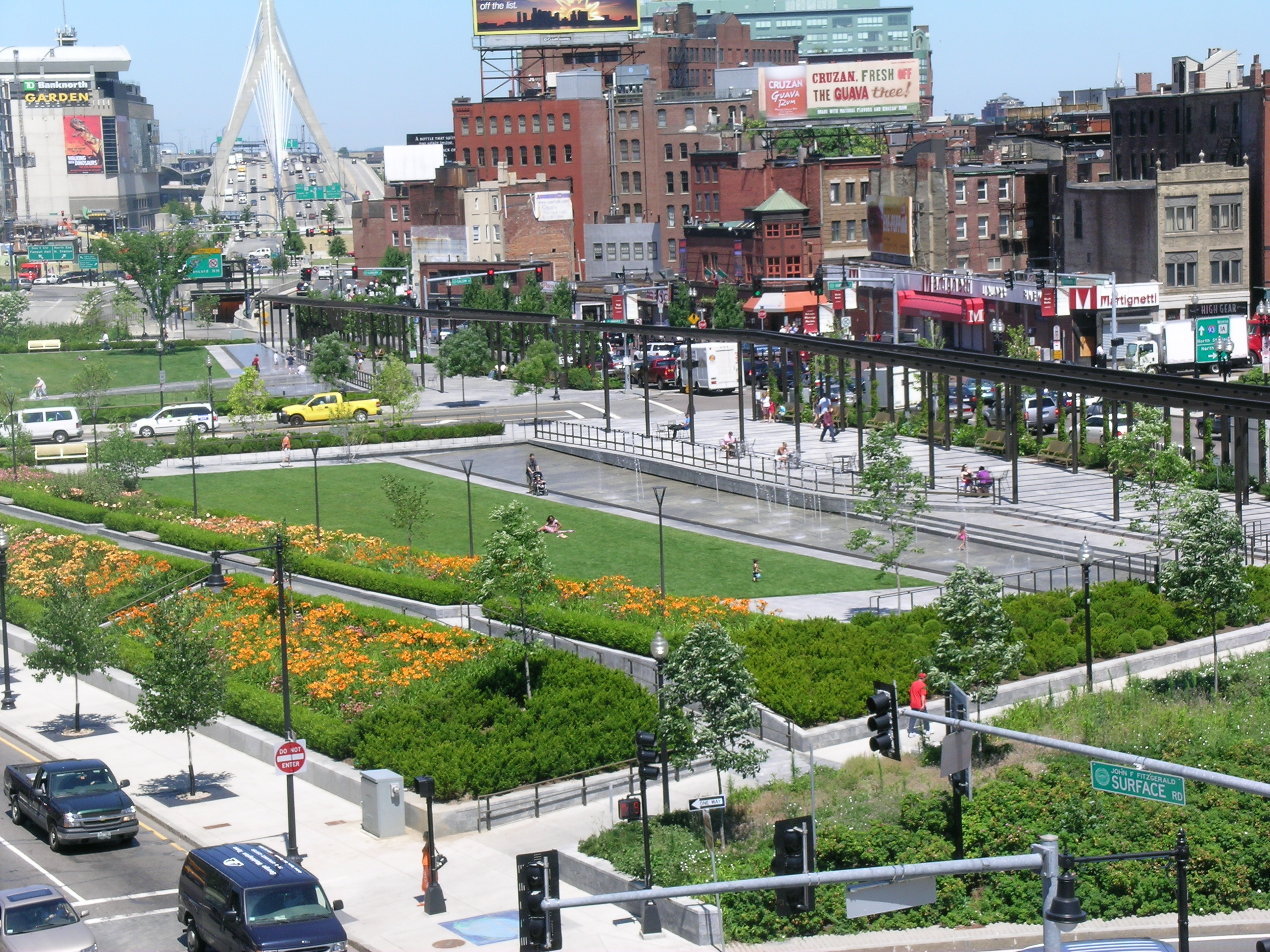
North End Park (2008) with Canal Fountain in background.

The North End Parks are the two northernmost parks on the Rose Kennedy Greenway, built over O'Neill Tunnel in Boston, Massachusetts and adjacent to the neighborhood known as the North End. Two landscape architecture firms (Boston's Crosby, Schlessinger, Smallridge and Seattle's Gustafson Guthrie Nichol) designed the 3-acre (12,000 m^{2}) North End Parks.

== Location ==
The North End Parks are built on Boston Big Dig parcels #8 and #10, which lie on opposite sides of Hanover Street. Parcels #8 and #10 were reserved by Boston's zoning code to be "programmed, designed, and detailed for the primary benefit of the adjacent North End community through the development of a series of spaces which invite both residents and visitors to use the park while clearly delineating a neighborhood presence and oversight of the park."

The 3-acre (12,000 m^{2}) parks are a significant "hinge" point between the grand civic spaces of Quincy Market, Government Center, Haymarket and the intimacy of Boston's oldest neighborhood. The city's historic Freedom Trail, which used to sit in the dark shadow of the elevated highway, weaves through the park.

The North End Parks site is defined by the surrounding streets—John Fitzgerald Surface Road, North, Cross and Sudbury streets—and by the O'Neill/I-93 tunnel structures and interchanges at the Callahan and Sumner tunnels beneath the parks. Once a "land bridge" that connected the peninsula of Boston with Sudbury Street to the west, the site has a rich history, more than 300 years, as a crossing ground for Bostonians. This site was also the low point between Beacon Hill and Copps Hill and subsequently was the logical choice for a mill canal that connected the swampy area known as the Mill Pond (later the Bulfinch Triangle) with the bay.

== Design ==
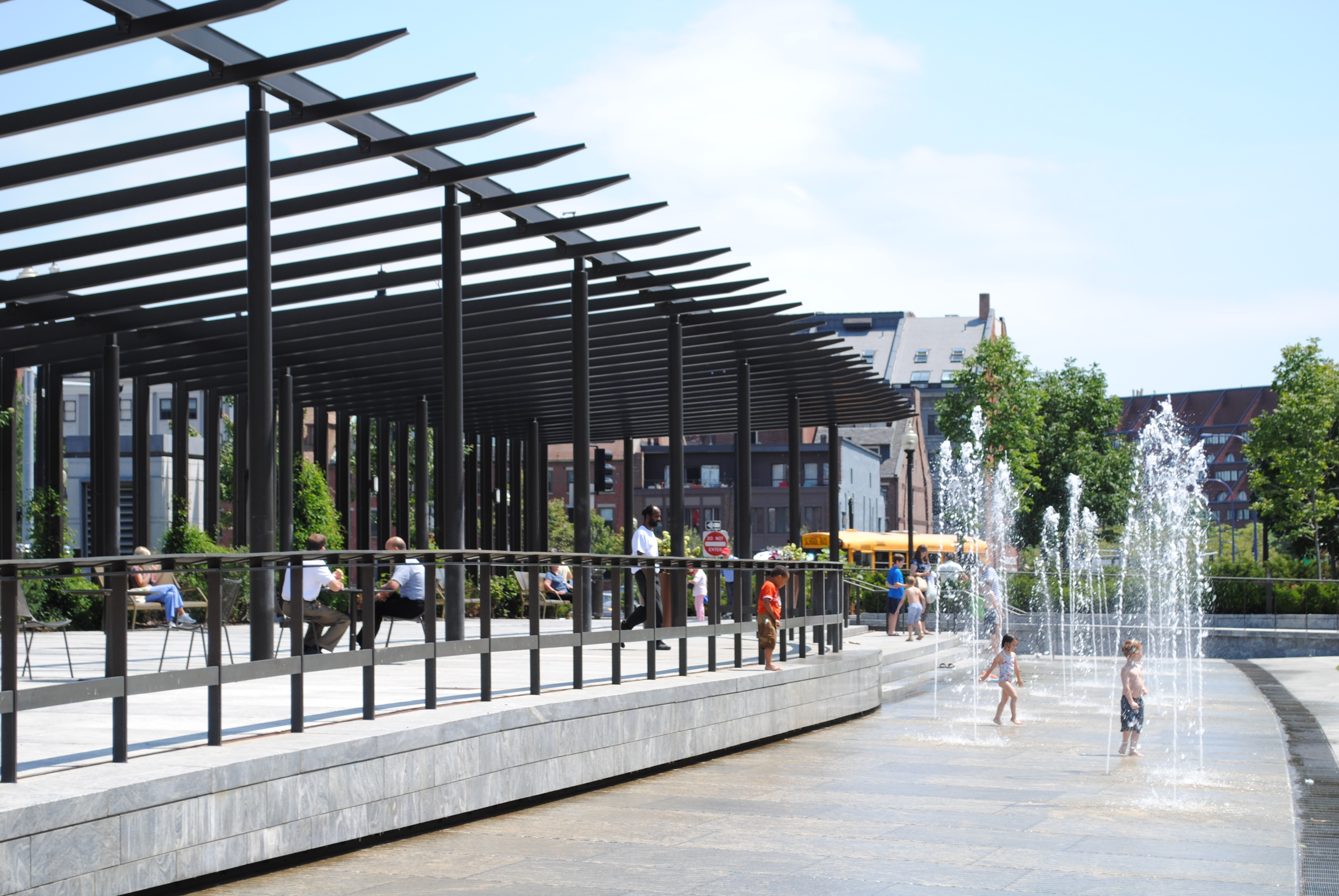
North End Parks: pergola and fountain

GGN and Crosby Schlessinger Smallridge designed North End Parks. The opening ceremony for the parks was held on November 5, 2007.

The North End Parks design concept features flexible spaces including green landscapes with a path system, plazas with pergolas and water features that run through both parks and appeal to a wide range of people, including North End residents of all ages and the thousands of tourists and Bostonians who visit each year. The enthusiastic involvement of the neighborhood and an engaging public process were essential in shaping the design of a new "front porch" for the North End.

A boxwood hedge frames the perennial gardens of irises, lavender, peonies and poppies that border the western edge of the parks. A variety of plants will flower continuously through spring, summer and fall. Trees such as magnolia, ash and a larger Washington elm adorn the parks. As a vibrant expression of Italian origins of today's North End, the community porch pergola is planted with flowering vines.

Chairs and tables and benches abound to read a book or enjoy a local slice. The parks leaning rails on Hanover Street feature quotes from some of the North End's prominent residents as well as a timeline of historic events. The parks are divided by the reconnected Hanover Street, which can be shut down to connect the two parks.
