= Rose Fitzgerald Kennedy Greenway =

Linear park on former expressway in Boston, MA

Coordinates: 42°21′25.85″N 71°3′4.52″W

Rose Kennedy Greenway
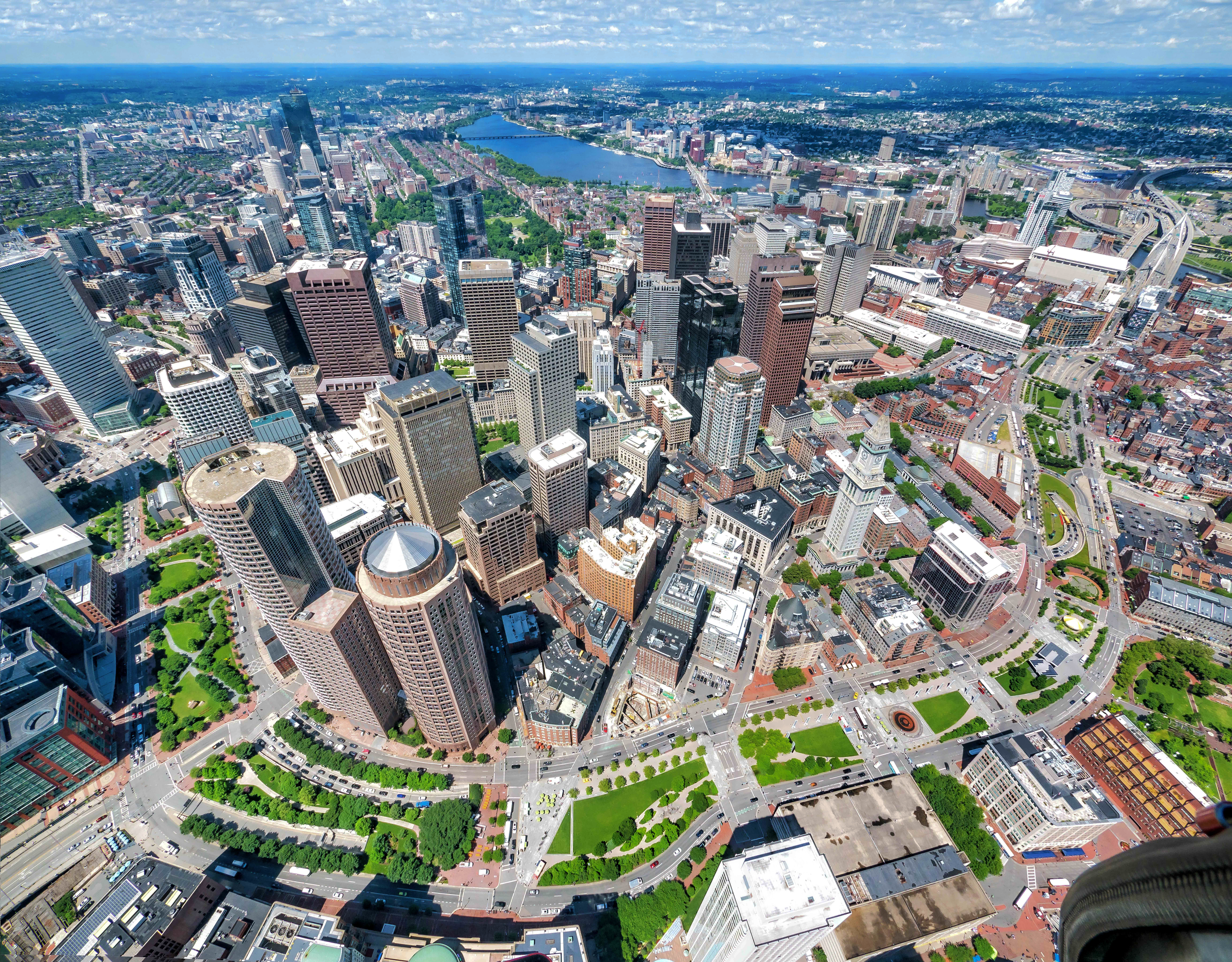
- The Rose Kennedy Greenway as seen from above
- Interactive map of Rose Kennedy Greenway
- Type: Linear park
- Location: Boston, Massachusetts
- Area: 17 acres (69,000 m^{2})/1.5 miles (2.4 km)
- Created: 2008
- Operator: Rose Kennedy Greenway Conservancy
- Status: Open all year (daily 7 a.m. to 11 p.m.)
- Public transit: South Station; Aquarium station Haymarket station North Station
- Website: www.rosekennedygreenway.org

The Rose Kennedy Greenway is a linear park located in several Downtown Boston neighborhoods. It consists of landscaped gardens, promenades, plazas, fountains, art, and specialty lighting systems that stretch over one mile through Chinatown, the Financial District, the Waterfront, and North End neighborhoods. Officially opened in October 2008, the 17-acre Greenway sits on land created from demolition of the John F. Fitzgerald Expressway as part of the Big Dig project.

The Rose Kennedy Greenway is named after Rose Fitzgerald Kennedy, the matriarch of the Kennedy family who was born in the neighboring North End neighborhood, the daughter of the former Boston mayor for whom the demolished expressway was named. Her son, Senator Edward M. Kennedy, played an important role in establishing the Greenway.

The Rose Kennedy Greenway Conservancy was established as an independently incorporated non-profit organization in 2004 to guide the emerging park system and raise funds for an endowment and operations. In 2008, the State Legislature confirmed the Conservancy as the designated steward of the Rose Kennedy Greenway; the Conservancy operates with a lease from the Massachusetts Turnpike Authority (now Massachusetts Department of Transportation). Since February 2009, the Conservancy has operated the park, leading the maturation of this new civic space, strengthening its physical beauty, and encouraging a sense of a shared community in Boston.

The 2008 legislation established a 50–50 public–private funding model. Through a multi-party funding agreement announced in June 2017, public funds from the State and City represent ~20% of the operating budget, a new Greenway Business Improvement District funds ~20% of the operating budget, and the Greenway Conservancy generates ~60%.

== History ==
In the 1940s, planning began for a "Highway in the Skies" that would alleviate traffic congestion and provide a direct route for moving goods in and out of Boston. Construction of the elevated Central Artery began in 1951 and was completed in 1959, displacing more than 10,000 residents and demolishing some 1,000 buildings. The limitations of the Central Artery soon became painfully clear, however. In 1991, after almost a decade of planning, construction began on the Central Artery/Tunnel Project, more widely known as the "Big Dig", which was recognized as one of the largest, most complex, and technologically challenging highway projects in the history of the United States.

With the elevated highway to be relocated underground, Boston would be rich in prime urban land. Community and political leaders seized the opportunity to enhance Boston's city life by providing additional parks and gardens to connect some of its oldest, most diverse, and vibrant neighborhoods. The creation of the Greenway was a joint effort of the Massachusetts Turnpike Authority (MTA), the Commonwealth of Massachusetts, the City of Boston, and various civic groups.

On October 4, 2008, tens of thousands of visitors came together for the park's inaugural celebration with the Rose Kennedy Greenway Conservancy. The following year, on February 23, 2009 the Rose Kennedy Greenway Conservancy assumed operational responsibility for the parks. Today, the Greenway encompasses gardens, plazas, and tree-lined promenades. The Greenway is a key feature of the modern reinvention of Boston, Boston Harbor, the South Boston Waterfront, and the Harbor Islands.

MassDOT's obligation under state law to provide 50% of the funding for the Greenway ended in 2012, and was replaced by year-to-year agreements until a six-year agreement in 2017. Now the Greenway Business Improvement District provides annual funding to the Greenway Conservancy, as do the City of Boston (from a fund established with proceeds from the sale of the Winthrop Square garage) and MassDOT.

== Parks ==
=== Auntie Kay & Uncle Frank Chin Park ===
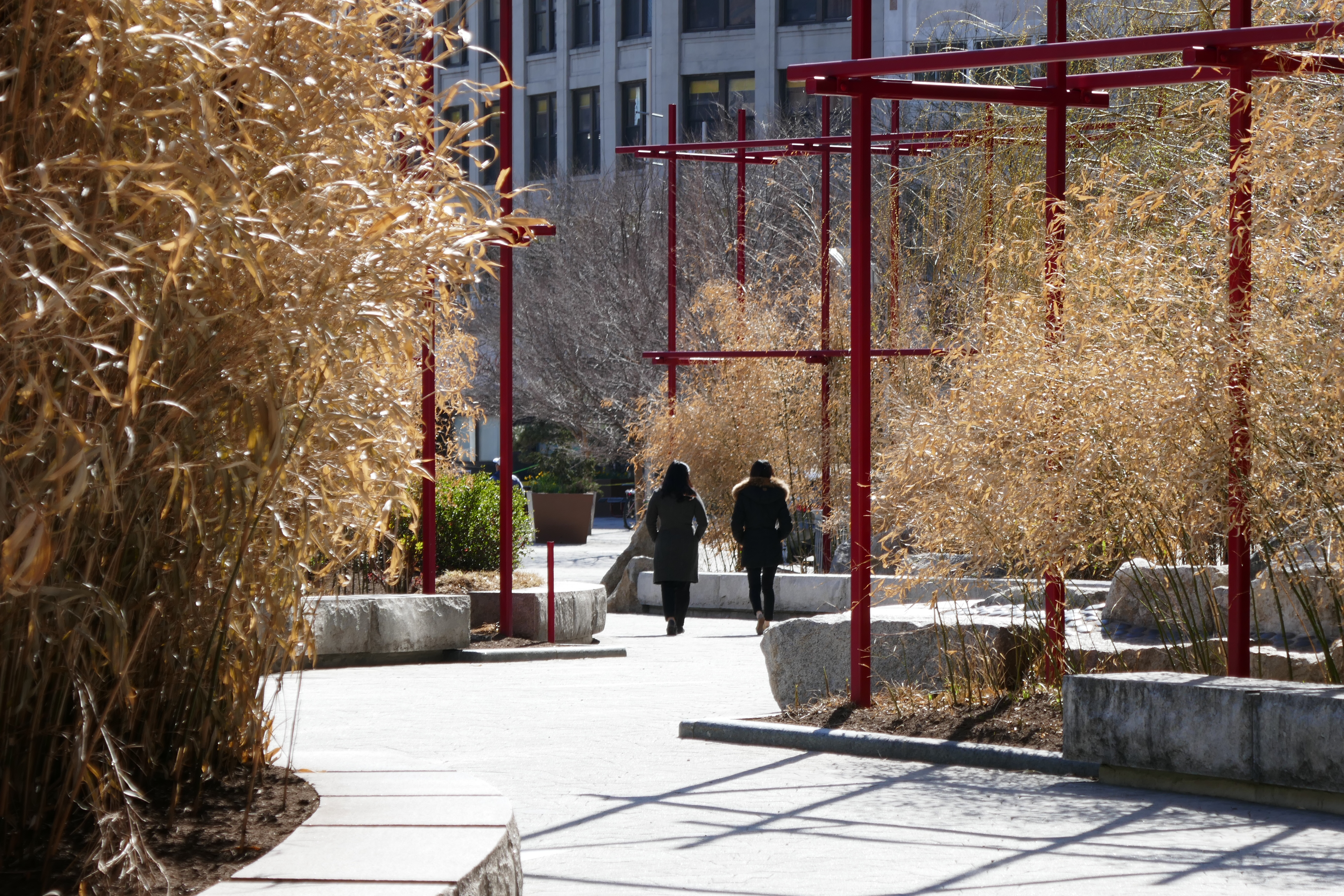
Auntie Kay & Uncle Frank Chin Park, formerly Chinatown Park

Auntie Kay & Uncle Frank Chin Park (formerly Chinatown Park) is located at the southern end of The Greenway. This one-acre park contains design elements drawn from Asian traditions and art work. Designed by Carol R. Johnson and Associates and May Sun, Chin Park has a large plaza, as well as a serpentine walkway edged by bamboo within bright red sculptural elements and a fountain that suggests a waterfall and shallow riverbed.

In 2011, the Rose Kennedy Greenway Conservancy partnered with local community groups, residents, and abutters to add the plaza tables, chairs and shade umbrellas, while the City of Boston renovated neighboring Mary Soo Hoo Park to the south. Large festivals, such as the Chinatown Main Street Festival, the August Moon Festival, and Films at the Gate, are hosted in the plaza. Mary Soo Hoo Park was added to the Greenway Conservancy's responsibilities in 2015. In 2016, the PlayCubes children's climbing structure was added to the plaza temporarily as part of the Design Museum Boston's Extraordinary Playscapes exhibit; a portion of the PlayCubes installation was made permanent based on community input.

In 2019, the park was renamed from Chinatown Park to Auntie Kay & Uncle Frank Chin Park.

=== Dewey Square Park ===
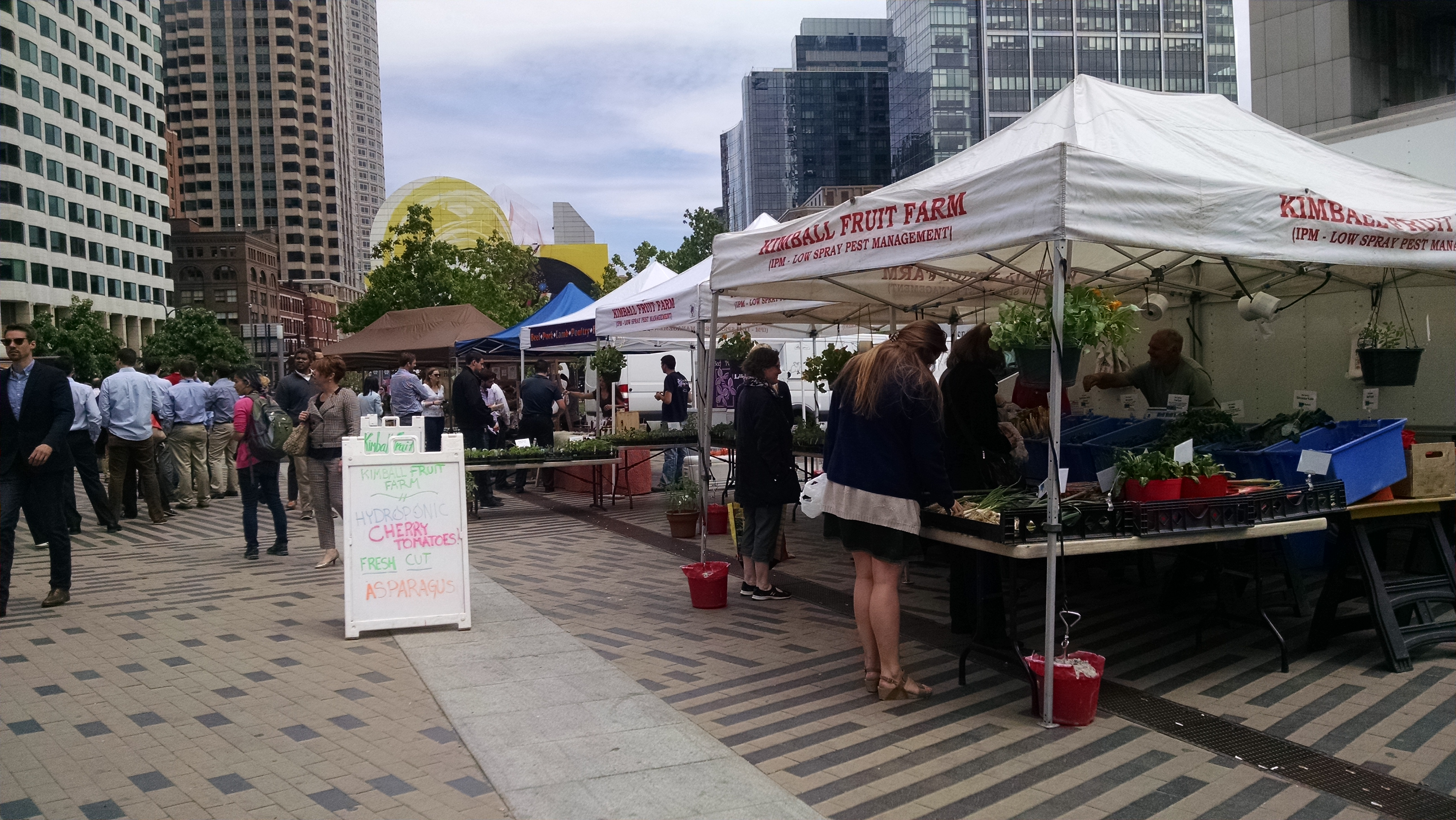
Farmers market in Dewey Square

Located between Congress and Summer Streets along Atlantic Avenue, Dewey Square Park joins the major transportation hub of South Station to the Financial District. The park has gardens, lawn areas, and the adjacent plaza, which was designed to draw in commuters and nearby workers and residents. The tables, chairs, and cluster of food trucks have made Dewey Square Park a popular lunch destination, especially in the warm seasons when the plaza features the twice-weekly Boston Public Market Association's farmers market. Food truck and other major festivals are hosted here.

In 2011, Dewey Square was the site of the Occupy Boston movement. The subsequent redesign of the planting includes pollinator garden, raised beds planted with edibles, a rain garden, and a small orchard; produce harvested from the edible garden is donated to hunger-relief charities.

=== Fort Point Channel Parks ===
The Fort Point Channel Parks are located between Oliver and Congress Streets along Atlantic Avenue, they are often referred to as the "New American Gardens" for their wide variety of trees and flowers that are often found in gardens of typical New England homes.

The Fort Point Channel Parks, designed by Halvorson Design Associates, were planted in 2008 by the Massachusetts Horticultural Society, with help from many volunteers including the Massachusetts Master Gardener Association. The Greenway Conservancy has added significant additional planting and is responsible for the ongoing care.

=== Wharf District Parks ===
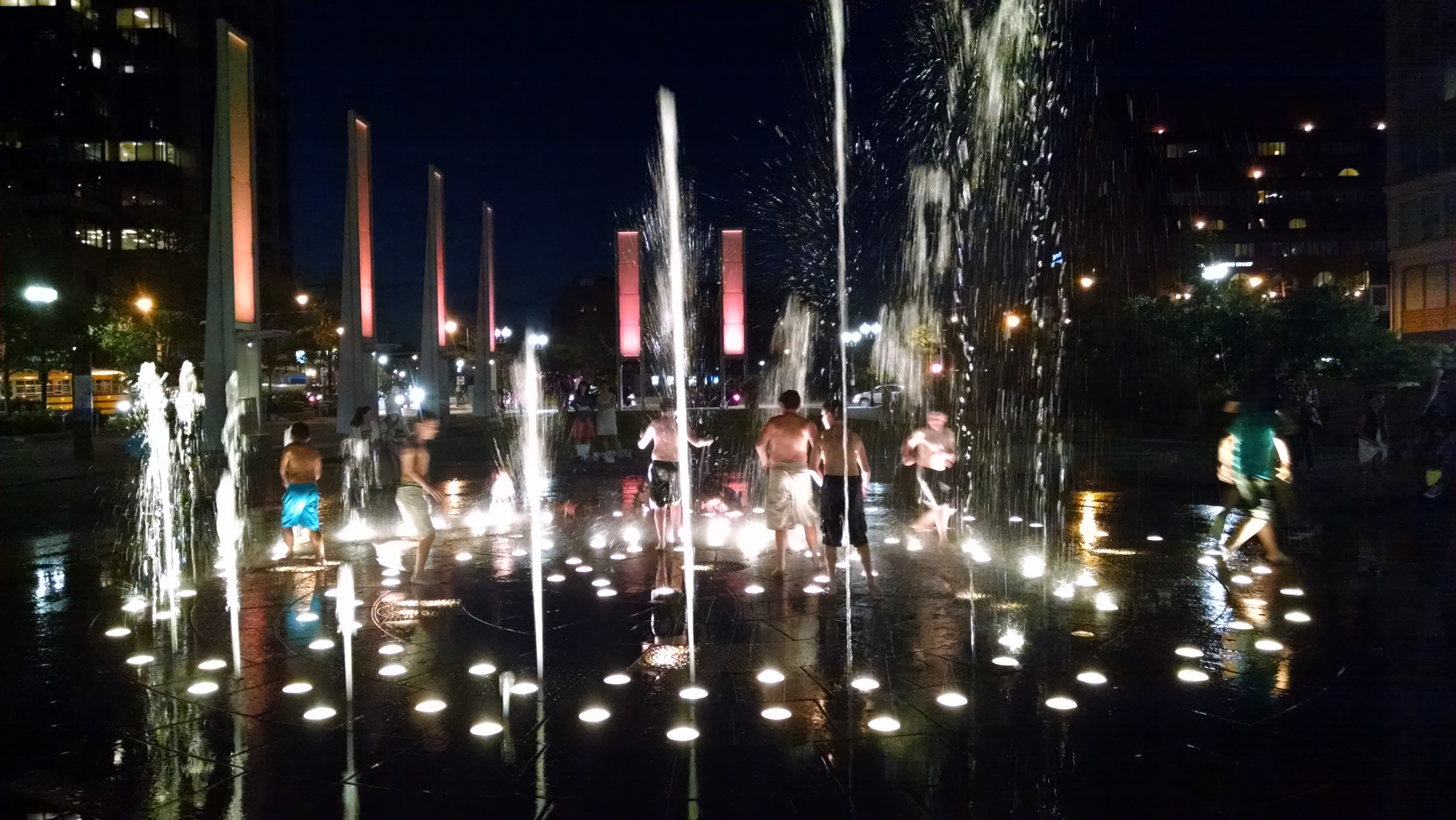
Rings Fountain in the Wharf District Parks

The Wharf District Parks connect Faneuil Hall and the Financial District with Boston Harbor. Designed by EDAW and Copley Wolff Design Group, the parks contain areas of paved surfaces for active public use and a gathering space for public events known as the Great Room. Three open lawn areas, surrounded with plantings, provide informal space for gatherings. During the warmer months, the Wharf District Parks host the Greenway Open Market, food vendors, concerts and fitness classes. Large events also occur across the Wharf District Parks, such as the Boston Local Food Fest and the FIGMENT participatory art festival. The Wharf District Parks are home to the Mothers’ Walk, a curving pathway that consists of pavers engraved with names and personal messages.

==== The Greenway Carousel at The Tiffany & Co. Foundation Grove ====
The Greenway Conservancy raised funds to design and construct the Greenway Carousel at The Tiffany & Co. Foundation Grove, which opened on August 31, 2013. Instead of horses, the hand-carved creatures of this carousel are the wildlife found in and around Boston and its harbor; the animals are carved by local sculptor Jeff Briggs and inspired by the drawings of Boston school children. ~100,000 visits enjoy a spin on the carousel each year.

==== Harbor Islands Pavilion ====
One of the new additions to the Wharf District Parks, the Harbor Islands Pavilion is an open-air structure staffed by National Park Service rangers to welcome visitors and provide information about the Boston Harbor Islands National Recreation Area. Ferry tickets and Boston Harbor Islands park merchandise are available for purchase at the pavilion. The Pavilion was designed by Utile and opened on June 2, 2011

=== Armenian Heritage Park ===
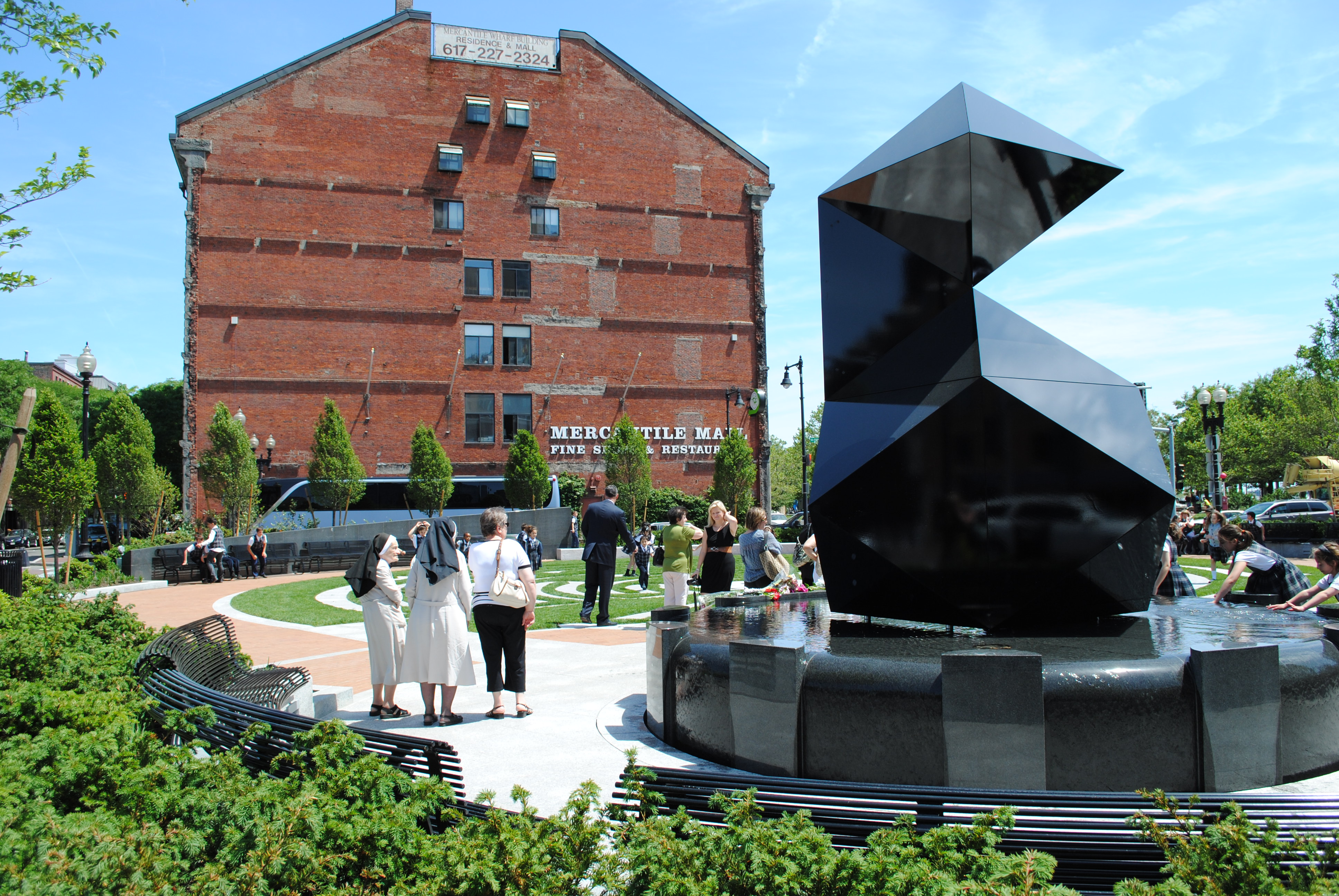
Armenian Heritage Park

The Armenian Heritage Park is dedicated to the victims of the Armenian genocide and acknowledges the history of Boston as a port of entry for immigrants worldwide, and celebrates those who have migrated to Massachusetts shores and contributed to American life and culture. The Park consists of two key features surrounded by seating, brick paving and landscaping. The Abstract Sculpture, a split dodecahedron, is mounted on a Reflecting Pool, represents the immigrant experience. The Labyrinth, a circular winding path paved in granite and set in lawn, celebrates life's journey. The Park and its endowed programs are a key initiative of the Armenian Heritage Foundation. The park opened in May 2012 The park is maintained by the Rose Kennedy Greenway Conservancy under contract with the Armenian Heritage Fountain.

=== North End Parks ===
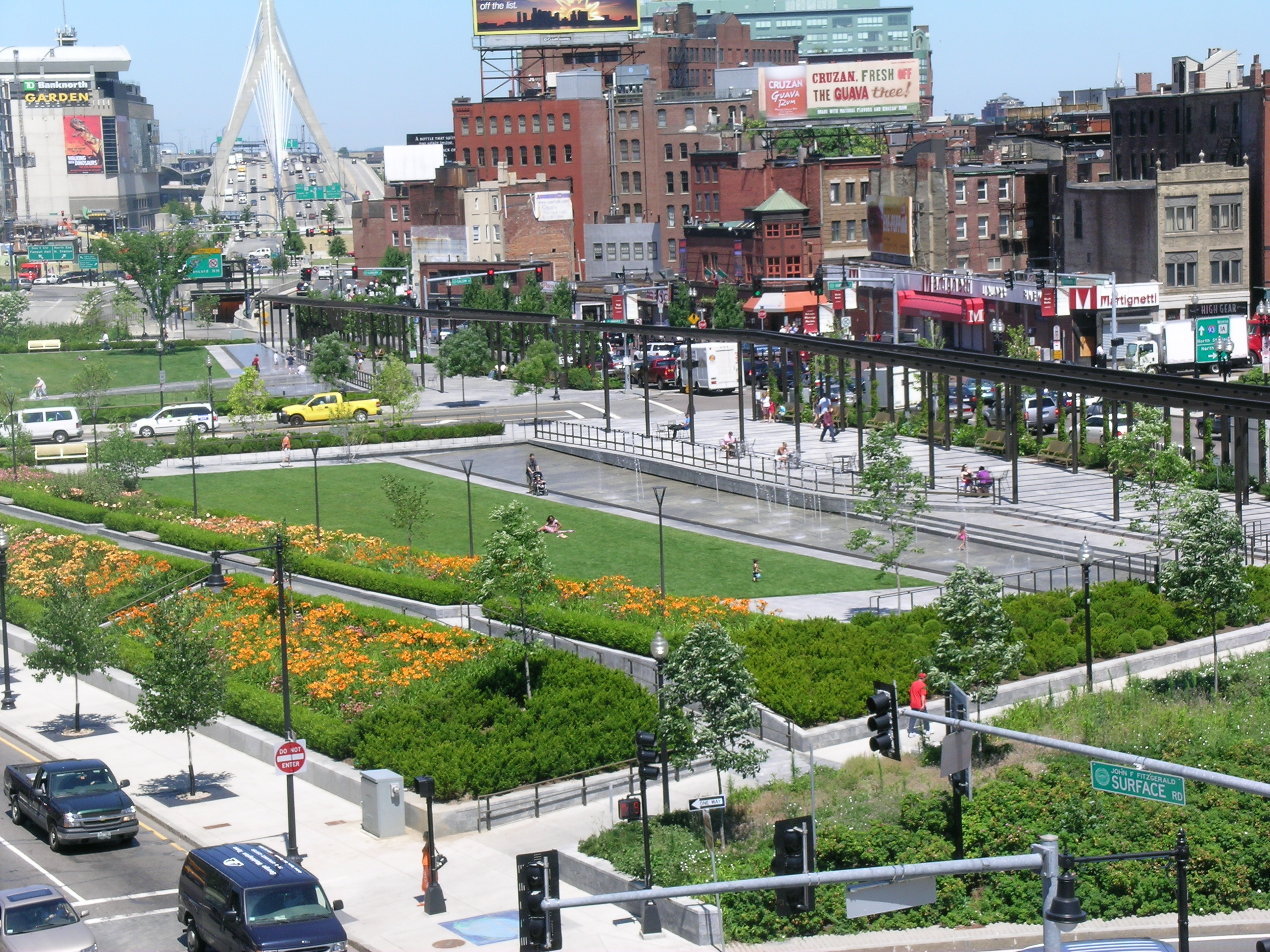
North End Parks. Canal Fountain visible in background.

The North End Parks (Boston Big Dig parcels #8 and #10, lying on opposite sides of Hanover Street) reflect the history and scale of the adjacent North End neighborhood. They were designed by two teams of landscape architects: Boston's Crosby, Schlessinger, Smallridge LLC and Seattle's Gustafson Guthrie Nichol Ltd. Lawns surrounded by densely planted perimeter beds are designed to evoke a formal feel of past European style gardens with boxwood hedges enclosing an array of perennials. A trellis and "pergola" along the eastern edge offer public seating and a vantage point that overlooks both greenspace and historic buildings. The "canal fountain," a shallow water feature with fountain jets, reflects a period approximately a century ago when a canal connected the harbor to now defunct industrial operations. During the warmer months, the North End Parks host free fitness classes and other events.

==== Carolyn Lynch Garden ====
The Carolyn Lynch Garden was dedicated by the Greenway Conservancy in a ribbon-cutting ceremony with The Lynch Foundation in August 2018. The garden's name is attributed to Carolyn Hoff Lynch, an avid gardener and philanthropist, who died in 2015. The dedicated gardens are part of a $1.4 million gift from The Lynch Foundation.

== Land use ==
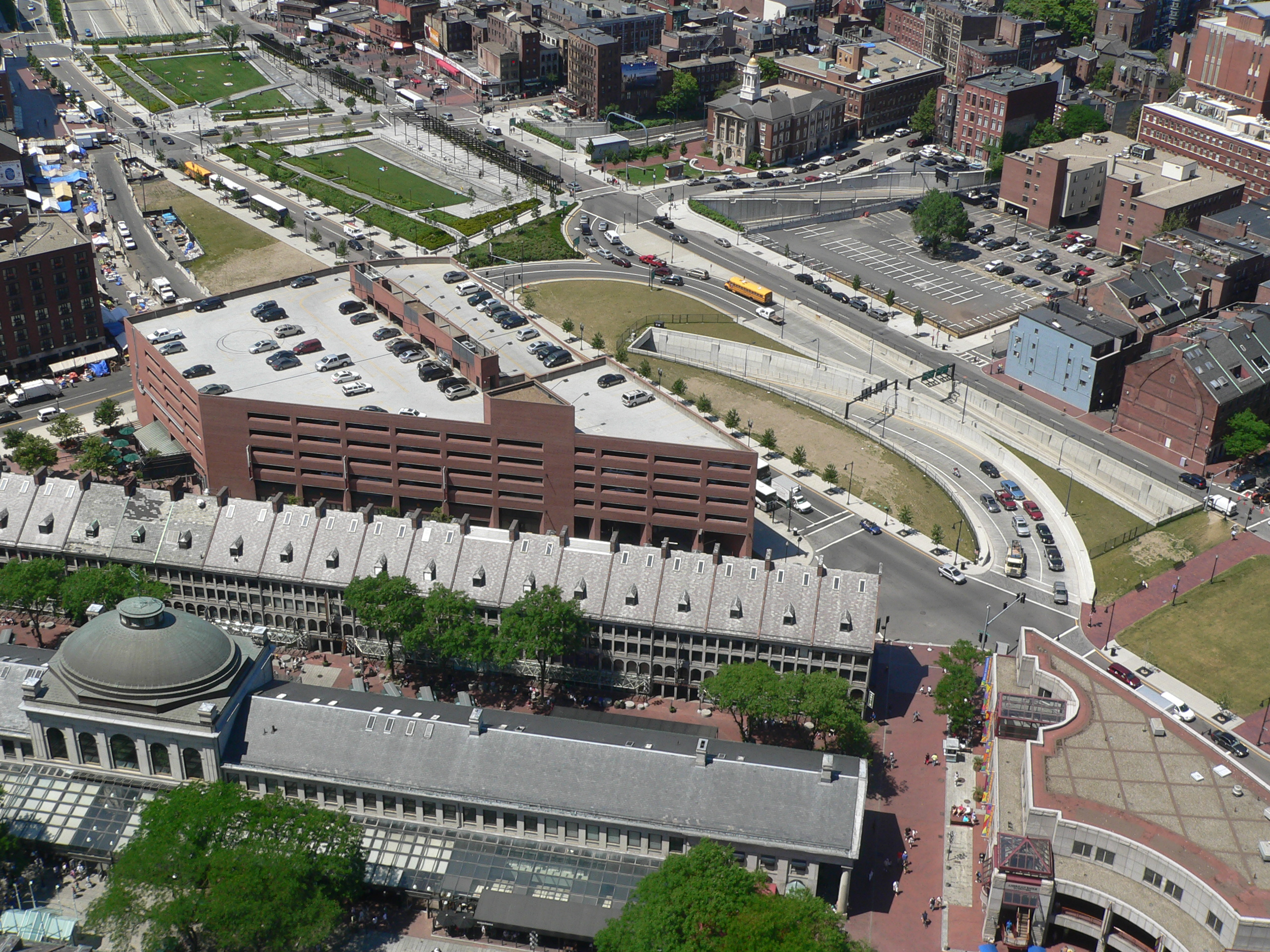
Greenway open space and development parcels

Big Dig planners debated the mix between open space and buildings on the land to be freed up by the removal of the elevated highway. Proposals in 1985 by the state and in 1988 by the Boston Society of Architects suggested that most of the land should be used for mid-rise buildings. But in 1991, the Boston Redevelopment Authority's "Boston 2000" plan called for 75% of the land "to be developed as a series of parks and urban plazas."

The 1991 environmental certificate for the project adopted this idea, mandating that not more than 25% of the surface could be developed, with the rest maintained as public open space. The certificate specifically required that three parcels near South Station, encompassing about four acres of land, be turned over to the Massachusetts Horticultural Society (MassHort) for outdoor gardens and an enclosed winter garden. And the certificate required that the three ramps at Parcels 6, 12, and 18 be covered "to mitigate their impacts on the surface environment."

The 2001 Central Artery Corridor Master Plan followed the 1991 mandate by designating specific parcels for open space or for development. A map showed the location of each open space and development parcel. Parcels 19, 21, and 22 were assigned to MassHort. The three parcels containing highway ramps were designated for development. All of the other parcels directly above the underground highway from Parcel 17 north to Parcel 7 were designated as parkland. All of the parcels not located directly above the new tunnel were designated for development.

A surface road carrying local traffic existed underneath most of the length of the elevated Central Artery. Big Dig plans called for the creation of a pair of one-way surface roads extending the length of the Greenway, to handle local traffic. Greenway parks and development sites would be bordered by these surface roads as well as by cross streets separating each parcel.

=== Massachusetts Horticultural Society parcels ===
In 1991, the Turnpike Authority authorized the Massachusetts Horticultural Society (MassHort) to develop gardens and an indoor "Garden Under Glass" on Big Dig Parcels 19, 21, and 22, near Dewey Square. But MassHort was unable to raise sufficient funds for the $100 million project, and cancelled it in 2008. The parcels were then turned over to the Greenway Conservancy, which created Dewey Square Park (Parcel 22) and Fort Point Channel Parks (Parcels 19 & 21).

=== Other park parcels ===
Parcels 8 and 10 were reserved by Boston's zoning code to be "programmed, designed, and detailed for the primary benefit of the adjacent North End community through the development of a series of spaces which invite both residents and visitors to use the park while clearly delineating a neighborhood presence and oversight of the park." They became the North End Parks. Parcel 13 became the Armenian Heritage Park. Parcels 14 through 17 became the Wharf District Parks. Parcel 23D became the Chinatown Park.

=== Ramp parcels ===
At three locations along the Greenway (Parcels 6, 12, and 18) ramps to and from the underground highway occupy some of the surface. The Big Dig's 1991 environmental approval certificate committed the state to cover the ramps. Nonprofit organizations were designated to develop buildings on the three sites, and the Massachusetts Legislature authorized $31 million to help pay the costs of building on top of the ramps. However, all three proposals were abandoned due to high costs between 2009 and 2011. In 2014, the Boston Redevelopment Authority initiated a review of the three parcels. Preliminary studies have proposed landscaping and partial coverage of some of the ramps.

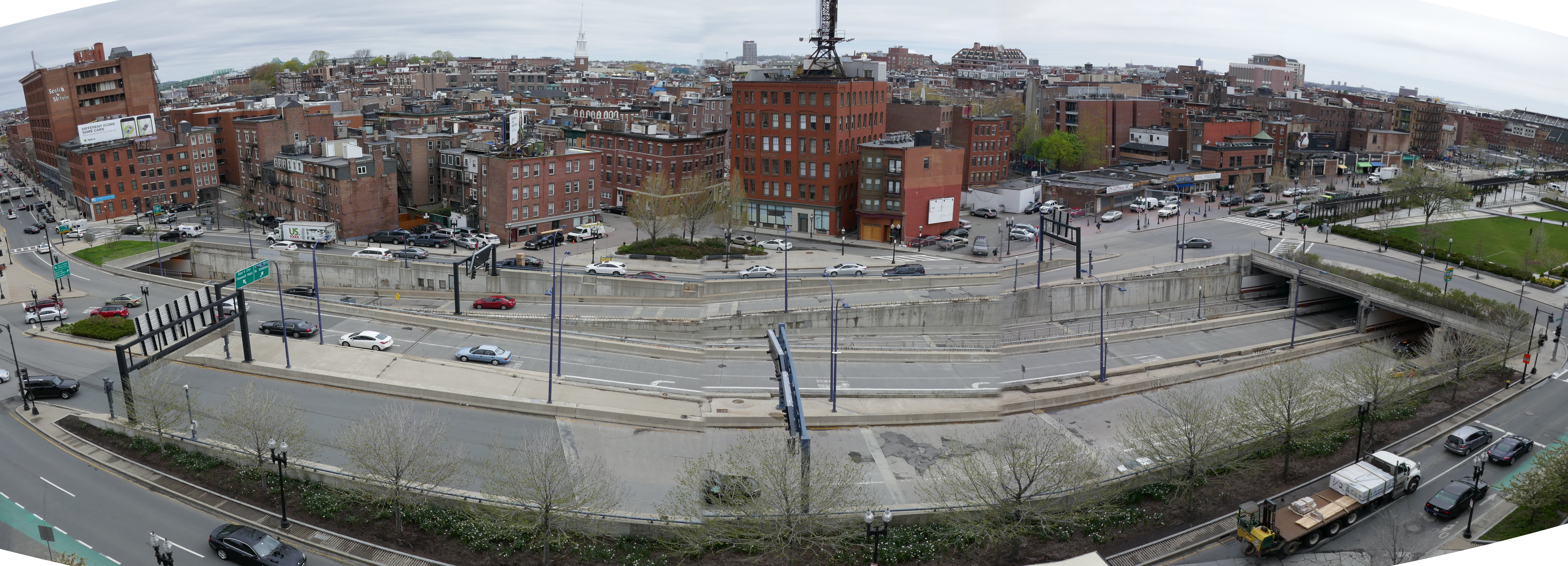
Panoramic view of Parcel 6

==== Parcel 6 ====
Parcel 6 is located at the northern end of the Greenway, adjacent to the North End Parks. The entire site is covered by highway ramps. In 2003, the YMCA of Greater Boston was designated to build a community center and gym on the parcel. The estimated cost of the building, designed by Childs Bertman Tseckares, was $70 million. In 2011, the YMCA abandoned its plans for the site, citing the high cost of building over the active highway ramps.

==== Parcel 12 ====
Parcel 12 is located just south of the North End Parks. In 2005, The Boston Museum was awarded the rights to build an $89 million museum designed by Moshe Safdie. The Museum gave up its plans in 2009. It made two unsuccessful bids for Parcel 9, one of the development parcels, before dissolving in 2013. The Museum's first proposal for Parcel 9 also included a plan to build a pedestrian bridge extending the length of Parcel 12.

Fencing keeps pedestrians off of the ramp structure of Parcel 12. The fencing on the west side of the ramps has been used by the Greenway Conservancy as the supporting structure for several temporary art exhibits, including "MAY THIS NEVER END", a 4 foot (1.2 m) by 319 foot (97 m) work by Matthew Hoffman that was installed in 2016.

A zip-line opened on Parcel 12 for one season in June 2017.

A wildflower meadow and beehives were added in 2019.

==== Parcel 18 ====
Parcel 18 is located between the Wharf District Parks and the Fort Point Channel Parks. In 2004, The New Center for Arts and Culture proposed construction of a $40 million art and cultural center to be designed by Daniel Libeskind. The center was designated as the developer of this site, but abandoned the plans in 2010. Unlike Parcels 6 and 12, Parcel 18 has a relatively small portion of its area devoted to the highway ramps. The rest of the parcel was intensively landscaped, and has a pedestrian walkway that extends its full length.

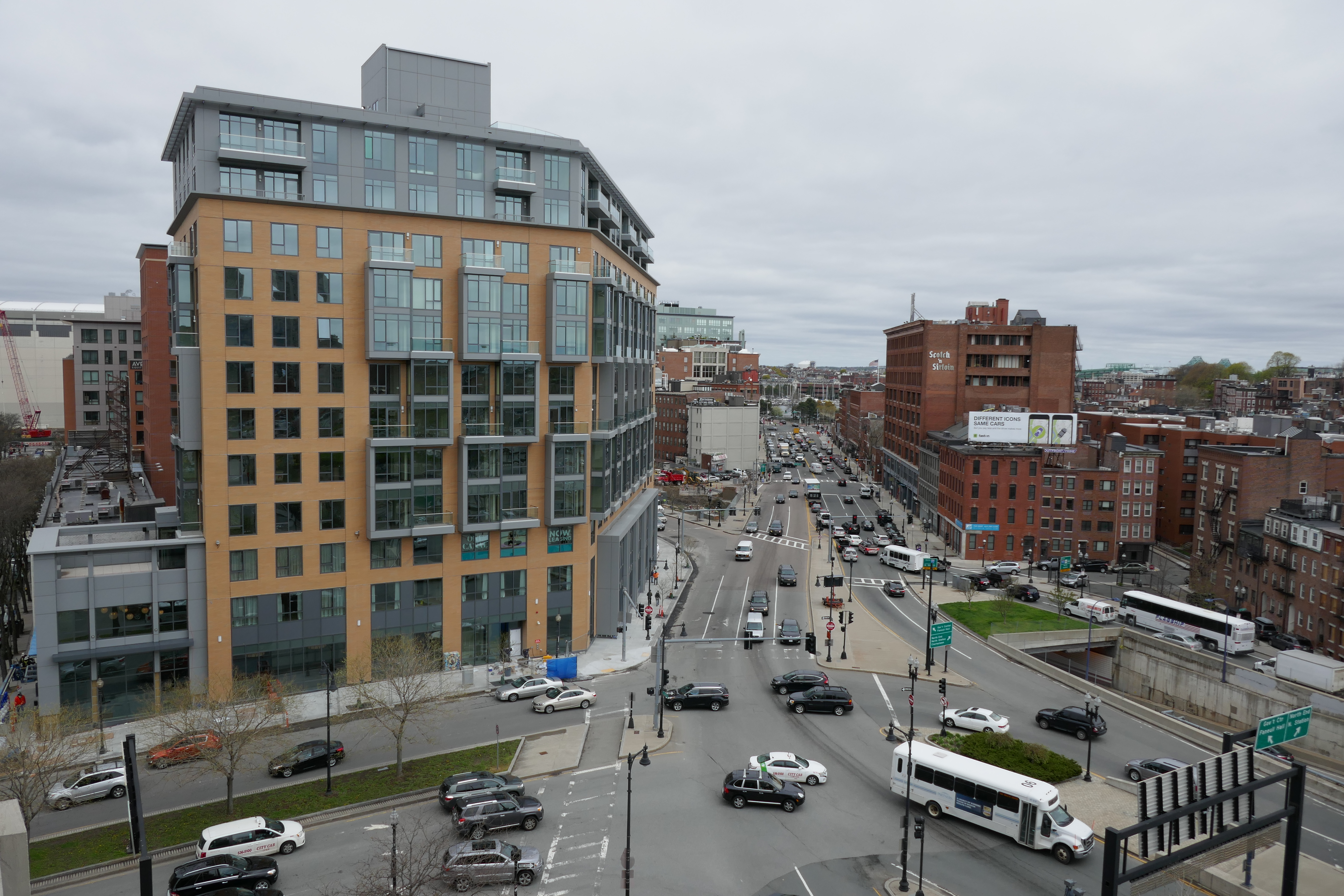
One Canal building under construction on Parcel 2a/b

=== Other development parcels ===
All of the parcels in the Bulfinch Triangle (Parcels 1, 1a/b/c, 2, and 2a/b) at the northern end of the Greenway are being developed with mixed-use, predominantly residential buildings, including The Victor, Parcel 1B, One Canal, and Avenir Apartments. As part of the Big Dig, a mixed use structure was built on Parcel 7 that contains a ventilation tower for the tunnel as well as a parking garage, state agency offices, part of the new Haymarket MBTA Station, and the Boston Public Market. Development of a hotel and market building on Parcel 9, adjacent to the Haymarket produce market, was approved in June 2016. No action has been taken on Parcel 11a or Parcel 11b; the latter is used as a parking lot for city employees. Parcel 24, near the southern end of the Greenway, is the site of the mixed-income residential building One Greenway, which opened in 2015. Parcels 25, 26, and 27, at the southern end of the tunnel, were the subject of unsuccessful requests for proposals in 2004 and in 2011. Plans to develop the land, now called the South Bay Kneeland Street Parcels, were revived in 2016.

== Public art ==
A permanent installation, Harbor Fog, by Boston artist Ross Miller, is located in the Wharf District Parks.

Harbor Fog water feature sculpture

The Conservancy has a program to install rotating exhibitions of contemporary public art on the Greenway.

Commissions by the Greenway Conservancy have won 8 awards from Americans for the Arts' Public Art Network, among the most in the country since 2012. Annually, PAN recognizes the best 50 new public art installations and has recognized Os Gemeos, The Giant of Boston (2012); Shinique Smith, Seven Moon Junction (2014); Kyu Seok Oh, Wandering Sheep (2015); Matthew Hoffman, MAY THIS NEVER END (2016); Mehdi Ghadyanloo, Spaces Of Hope (2017); Meredith James, Far from this setting in which I now find myself (2017); and Mark Reigelman, The Meeting House (2017); and Anne Lilly, Temple of Mnemon (2018).

A series of temporary murals are rotated each fall on the 70' × 76' wall of the air intake structure overlooking Dewey Square Park. In 2012, Brazilian twin brothers Otavio and Gustavo Pandolfo (Os Gêmeos) painted a mural on the wall, in conjunction with their first solo exhibition in the United States at Boston's Institute of Contemporary Art. In fall 2013, a new mural, Remanence: Salt and Light (Part II) by Matthew Ritchie replaced the Os Gemeos mural. The third mural on the Greenway Wall was Seven Moon Junction by Shinique Smith, installed in 2014. A TRANSLATION FROM ONE LANGUAGE TO ANOTHER by Lawrence Weiner was installed on the Greenway Wall in 2015 and remained through September 2016. Spaces of Hope, by Iranian artist Mehdi Ghadyanloo, was installed on the wall in October 2016. Shara Hughes's Carving Out Fresh Options was installed on the Greenway Wall in May 2018, and the current mural, Resonance by Super A was installed in May 2019.

=== As If It Were Already Here by Janet Echelman ===
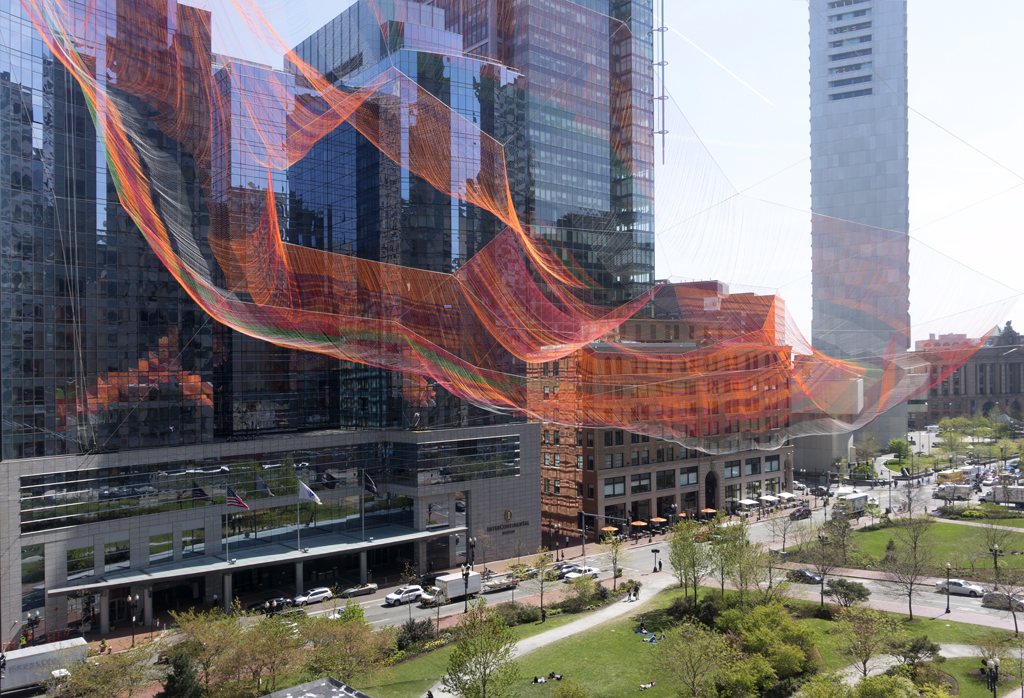
As If It Were Already Here

In 2015, the Conservancy commissioned the installation of a work called As If It Were Already Here by Janet Echelman. The installation was attached to three adjacent high-rise buildings, so that it was suspended above the Fort Point Channel parks. In 2023, the Boston Society of Architects awarded the work its Harleston Parker Medal, which recognizes "the most beautiful piece of architecture, building, monument, or structure built in the metropolitan Boston area in the past 10 years."

=== Circle of Animals/Zodiac Heads by Ai WeiWei ===
An exhibit of sculptures called "Circle of Animals/Zodiac Heads, by Chinese artist and activist Ai Weiwei, was installed in April 2016 at the Rings Fountain in the Wharf District Parks, and remained on exhibit until October.

For the first time in 2017, The Greenway curated a year-long site-specific series of Public Art installations throughout our parks entitled Playful Perspectives. The surreal installations challenged visitors’ perception of reality while engaging the viewer in a playful manner. Works of artwork included Mark Reigelman's Meeting House, Meredith James' Far from this setting in which I now find myself, Aakash Nihalani's Balancing Acts I/II and Chris Templeman's Make and Take 3D printing Rooster Machine.

=== GLOW ===
In 2018 The Greenway installed GLOW, a public exhibition of commissioned light-based artworks, historically significant Massachusetts light based roadside architecture, and interactive experiences that showcases the rapidly evolving concept of light and art, helping to shape our sense of place, and our collective and individual identities. Commissioned artworks included Anne Lilly's Temple of Mnemon and Luftwerks Transition.

=== The Auto Show ===
The Greenway's 2019 Public Art exhibition, titled The Auto Show, was an exhibition consisting of both loaned and commissioned works by nationally & internationally renowned artists that explored the form of the automobile and the imaginative qualities of construction and movement through ideas of transportation. The Auto Show helped to mark the 10th anniversary of the non-profit Greenway Conservancy's care and management of The Greenway by leading visitors to reflect on the former elevated Central Artery and the history of site as a transportation corridor. Artworks included Erwin Wurm's UFO, Computer Generated Graphics (CGI) by Chris Labrooy, No Direction by Julie Libersat, and OPERANT (An Oldowonk Cataract) by Karl Unnasch.

== Public programs ==
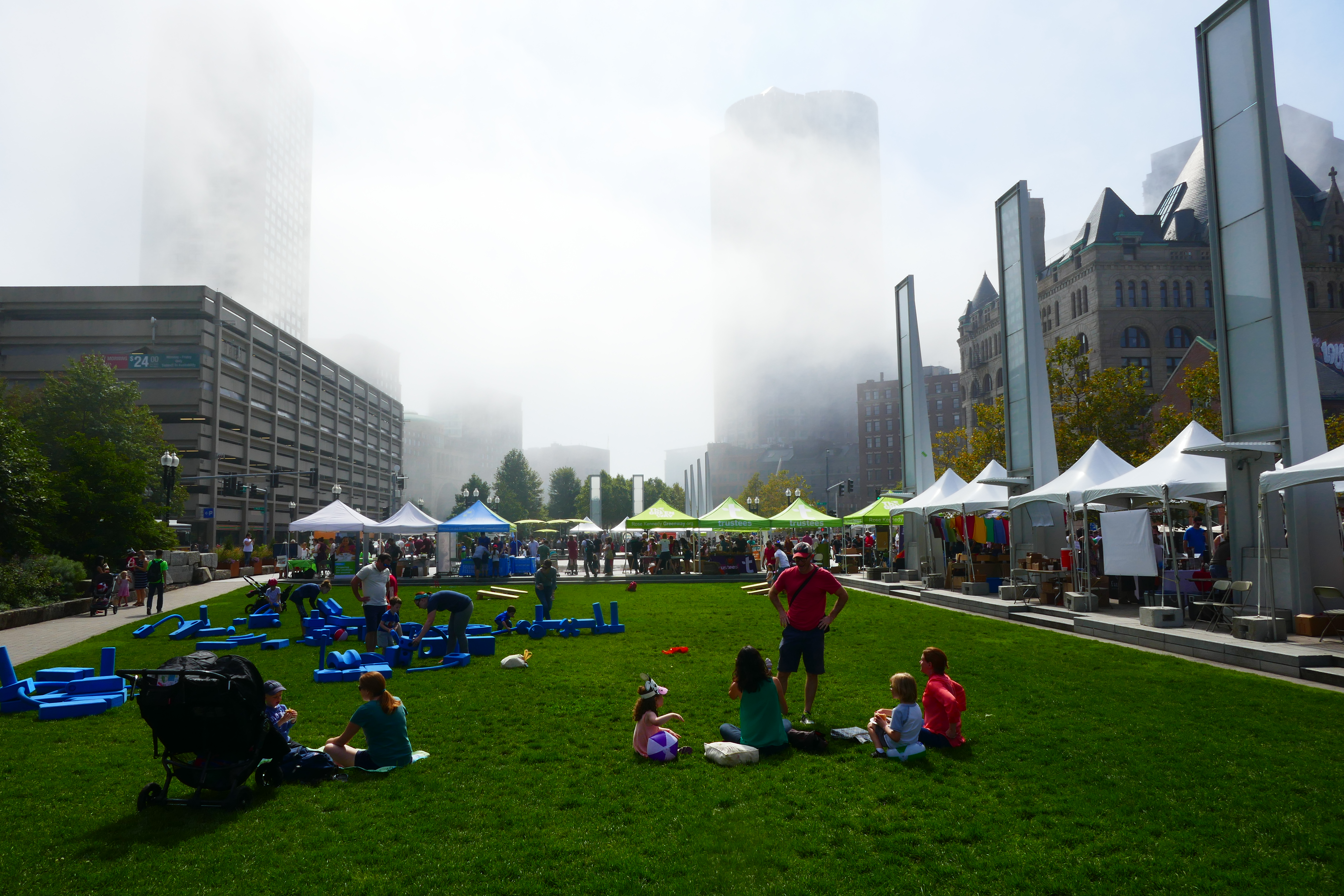
Boston Local Food Festival, 2017

Public programs and events on the Greenway, organized by the Greenway Conservancy in partnership with cultural institutions and businesses, have included art festivals, food truck competitions, concerts, markets, and more, and are geared toward multi-generational and multi-cultural audiences. Trackable visitation of the Greenway has increased from 96,000 visitors in 2009 to 800,000 in 2013 and to 1.38 million in 2016; many additional visitors enjoy the fountains, gardens, public art, and pathways. A free Wi-Fi network running the length of the park was added by the Conservancy in 2010.

Over 400 free events are held on the Greenway annually. Recurring events include the FIGMENT participatory art festival in July, the Boston Local Food Festival in September, the Greenway artisan market from May through early October, World Labyrinth Day in May, the Berklee College of Music Summer Concerts at the Greenway, and the Coolidge Corner Theatre's "Coolidge at the Greenway" movie series. The Boston Public Market farmers market at Dewey Square is held twice weekly from May to November annually. Annually ~100 free fitness classes are held through the Greenway, including yoga, cardio dance, strength and conditioning circuits, and parkour workouts.

The "Greenway Mobile Eats" program brought Boston's first gourmet food truck to Dewey Square Park in 2010; the Greenway Conservancy now works with 30+ rotating food trucks each year.

The Greenway Conservancy has partnered since 2017 with the Trillium Brewing Company on a seasonal outdoor beer garden, located at Atlantic Avenue at High Street on the Greenway, with a half-dozen beers on tap and Westport Rivers Winery on offer. The Greenway Conservancy opened a second beer garden for the 2018 season on Dewey Square Plaza on the Greenway; this was operated by Downeast Cider in 2018 and by City Winery in 2019.

== Sustainable horticulture ==
The Conservancy uses organic and sustainable landscape management programs to maintain the parks and features of the Greenway. The Greenway is Boston's only organically maintained public park and one of a handful of organically maintained urban parks in the United States. Organic maintenance means no expenditures for toxic chemicals, and lower expenditures for watering. Plants are healthier, more resilient, and better able to withstand the wear of public use. The Conservancy's practice of using composting and compost tea instead of herbicides and toxins also ensures that run-off from the parks will not pollute Boston Harbor or harm the delicate marine life. Children and pets can freely and safely play on the park lawns without the worry of pesticides.

The Conservancy has planted a series of new garden spaces, including a wildflower meadow, to create a "pollinator ribbon" to attract and support beneficial insects.

== Gallery ==
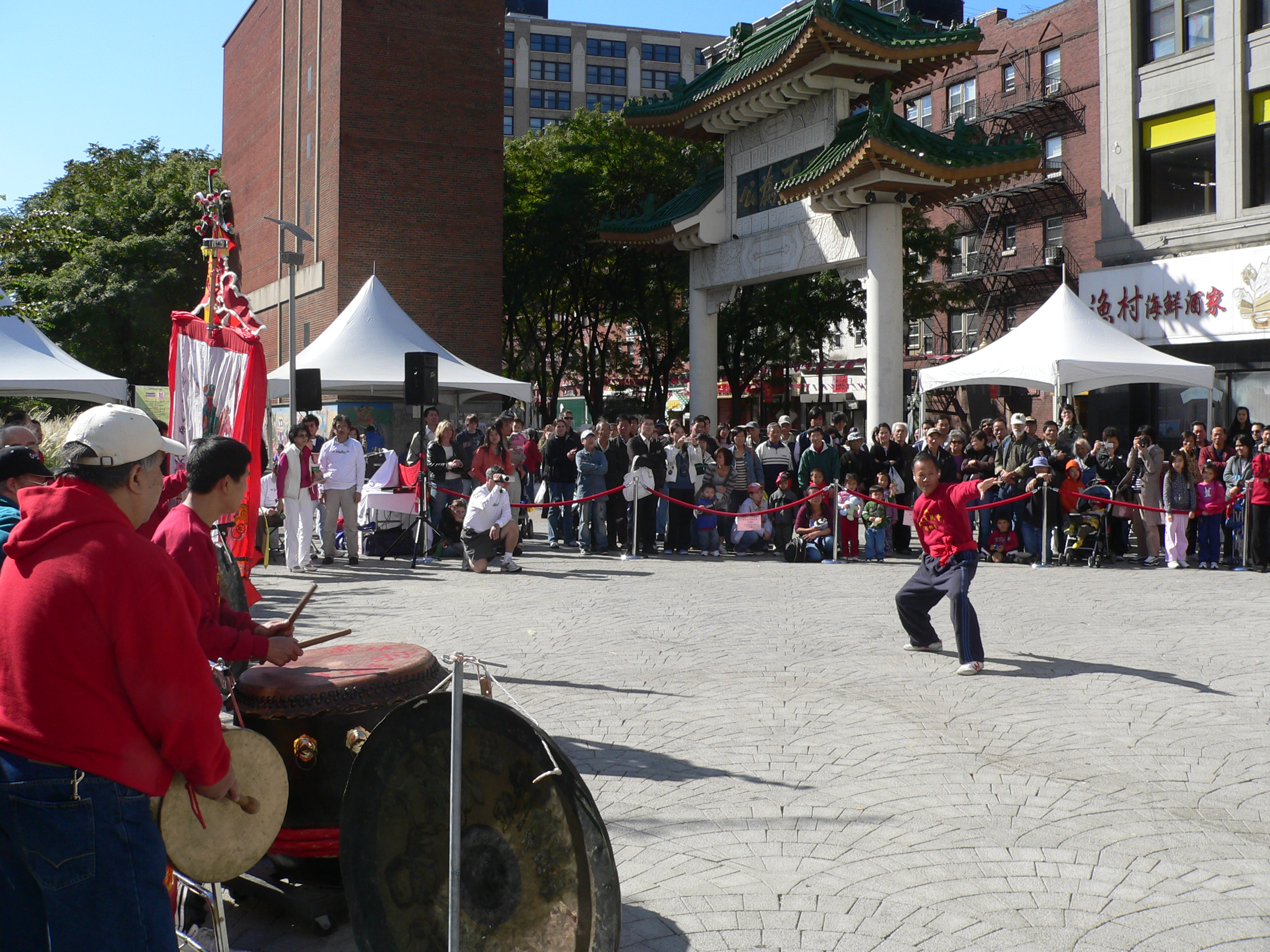
Dance performance in Auntie Kay & Uncle Frank Chin Park, 2008

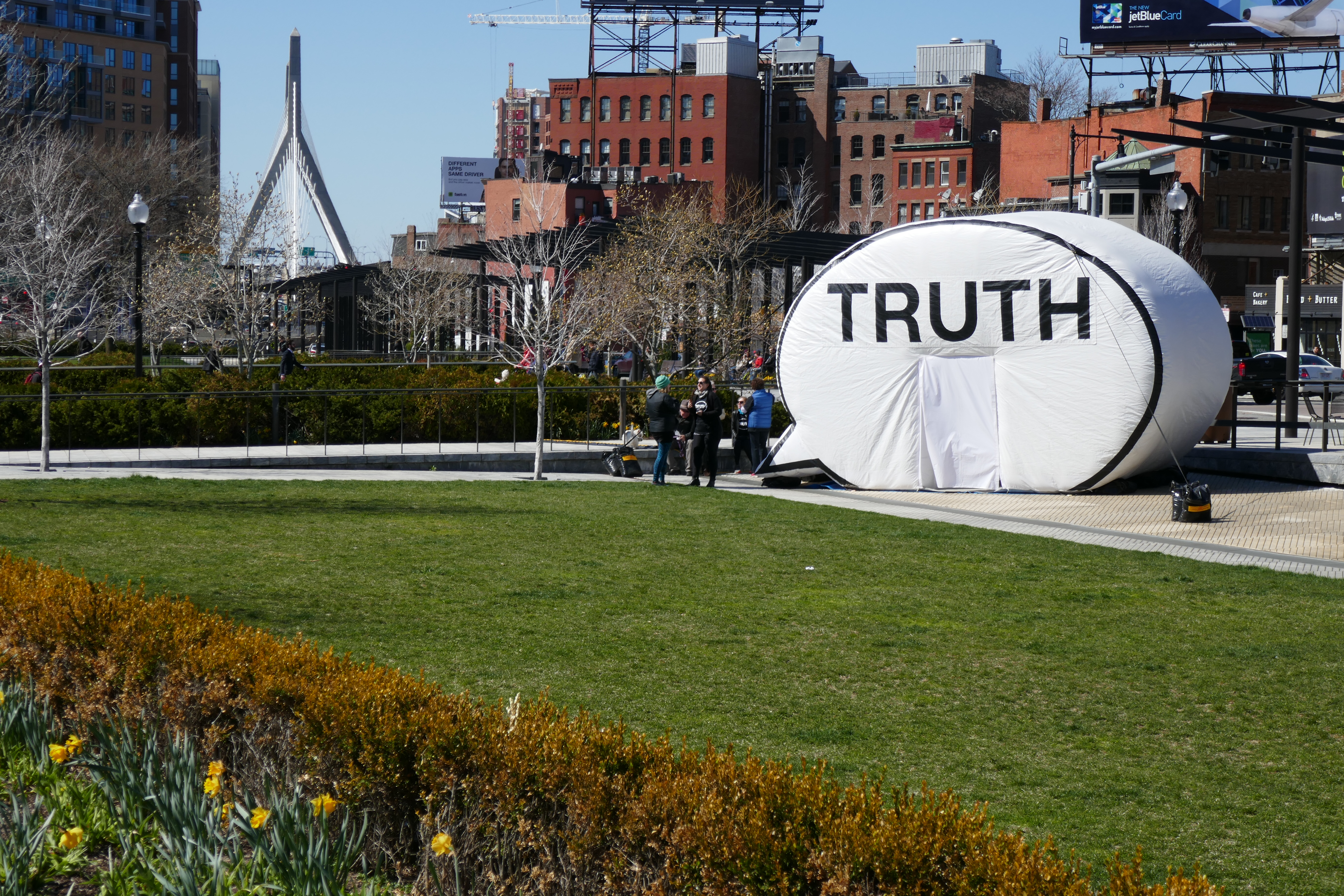
Truth Booth, by The Cause Collective, in the North End Parks, April 2016

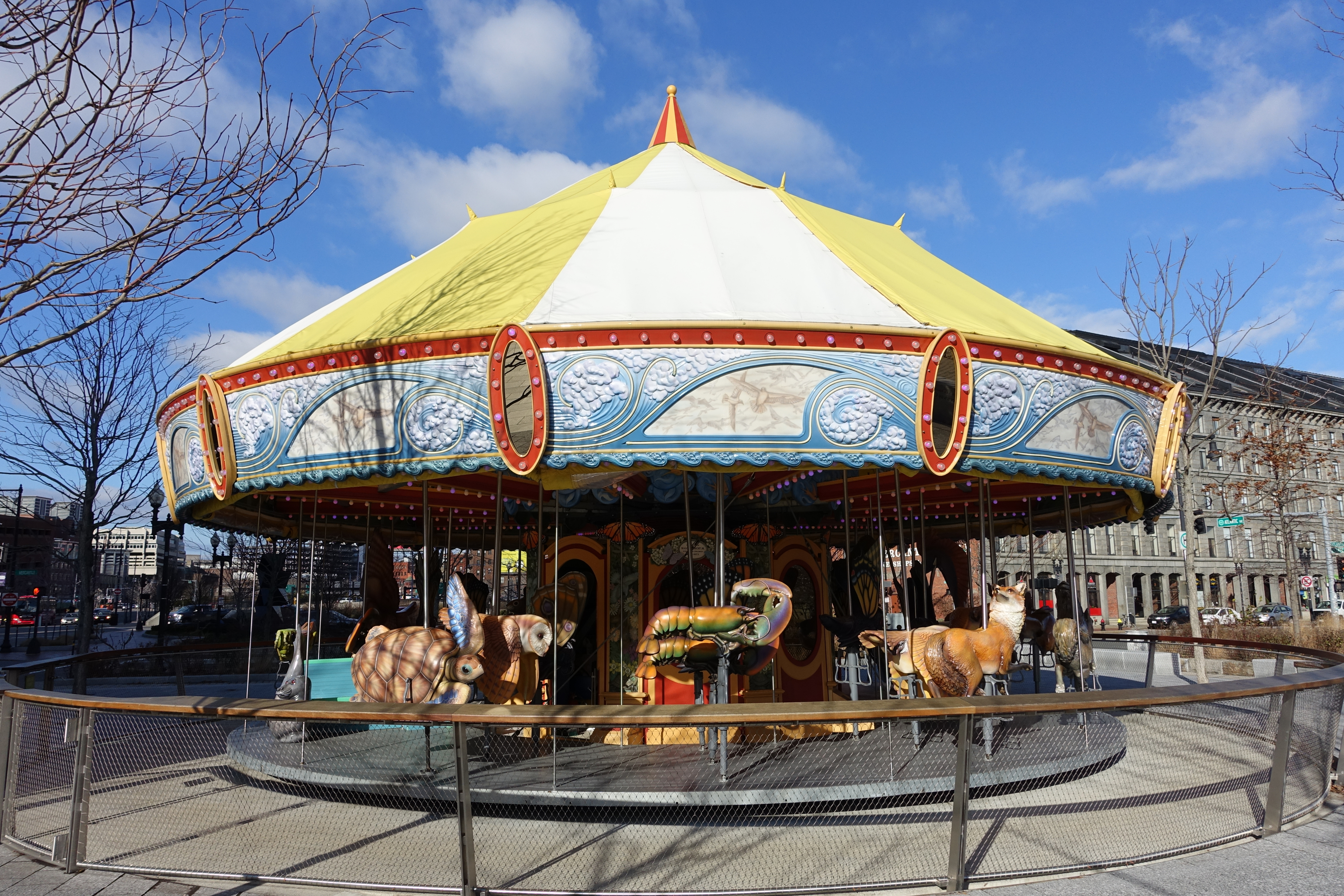
The Greenway Carousel

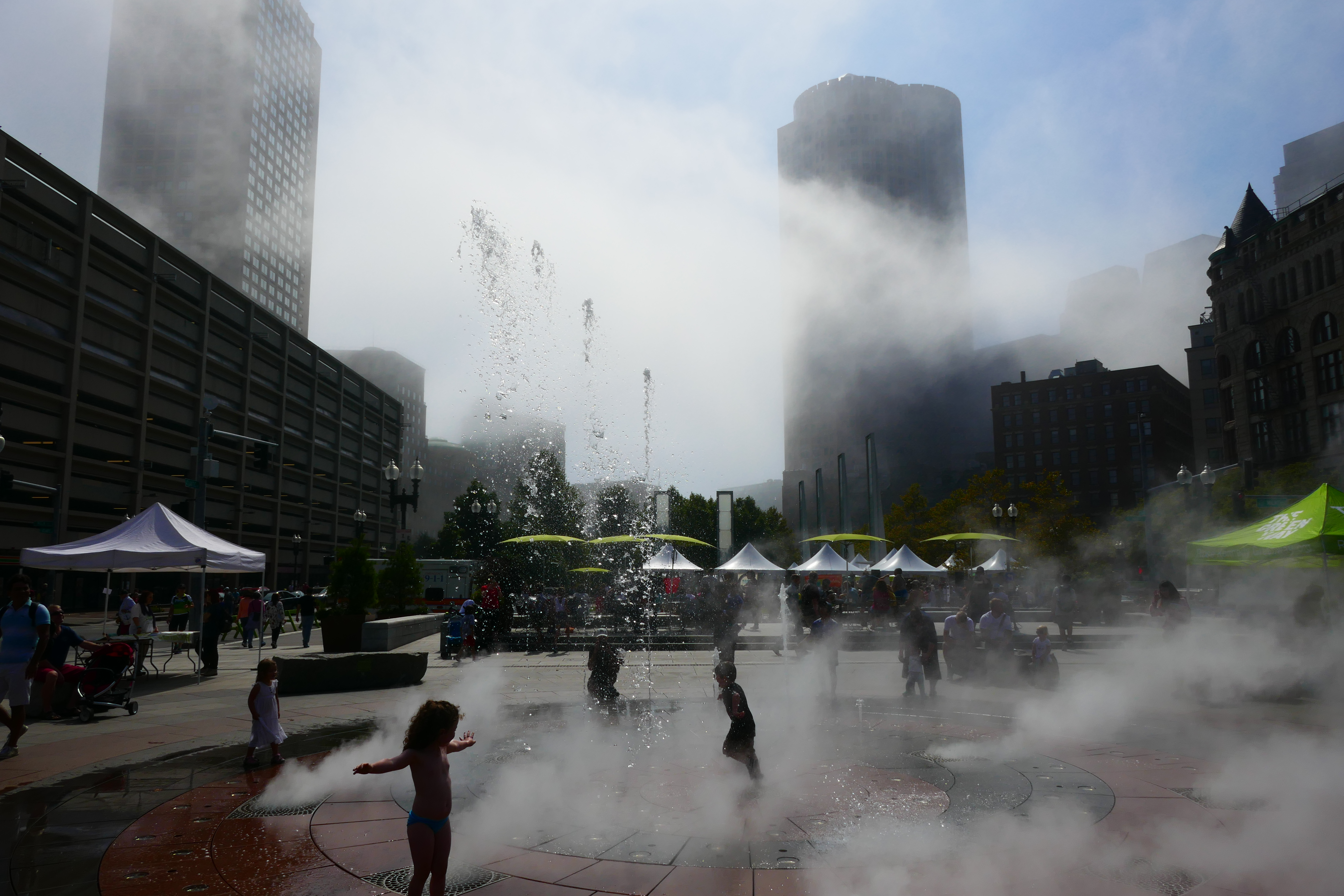
Children play in the Rings Fountain

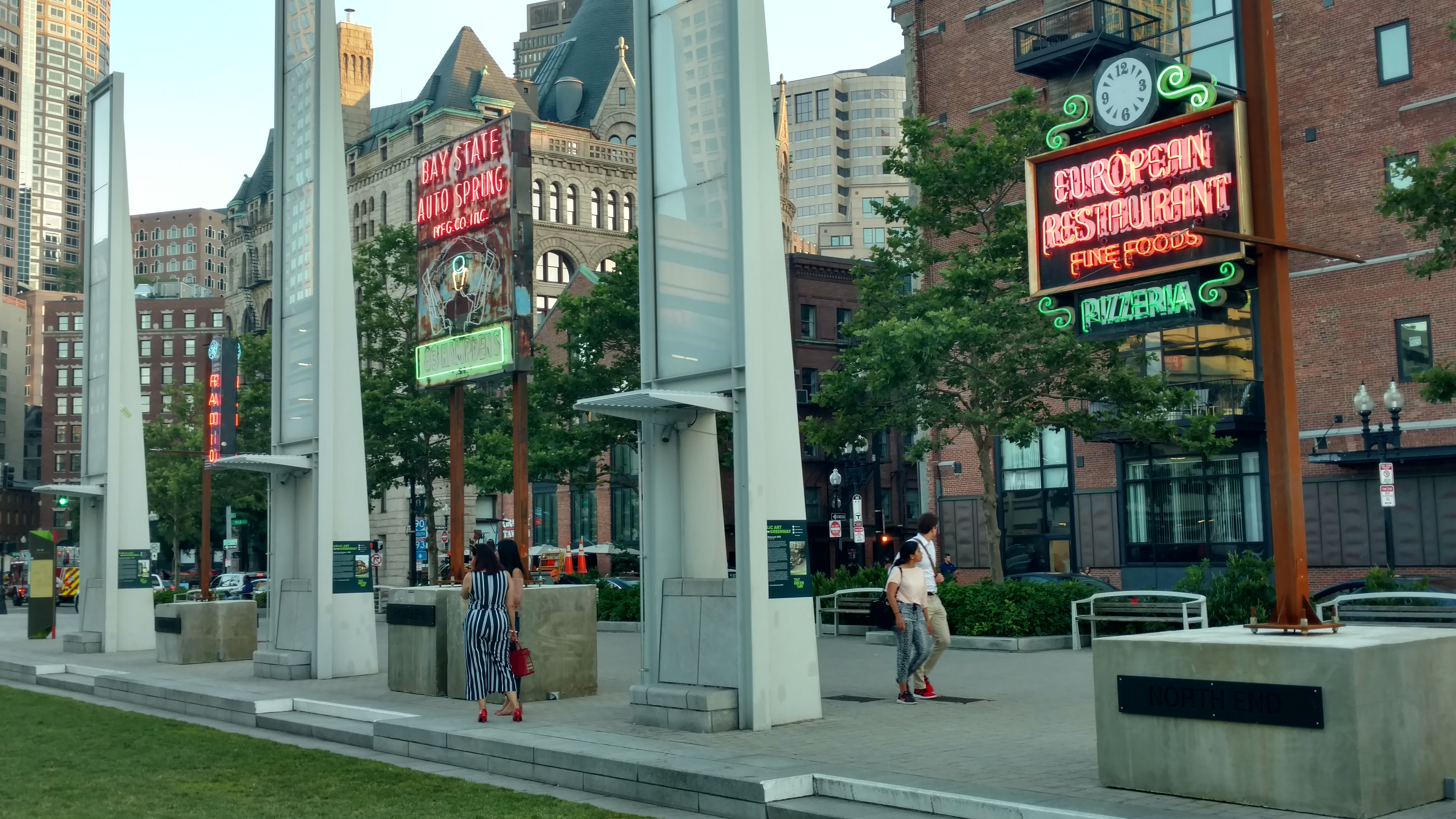
GLOW exhibit of historic neon signs, summer 2018

== See also ==
- Boston Harborwalk
