= May Sun =

American sculptor

- Born: May Sun; 1954 (age 71–72); Shanghai, China
- Education: B.A. 1976 UCLA
- Known for: Public art
- Awards: National Endowment for the Arts (1989 and 1993), Brody Arts Fund Fellowship (1987), Durfee ARC Grant (2001), Visual Arts Fellowship, J. Paul Getty Trust Fund for the Visual Arts (1995)
- Website: https://maysunstudio.com/#home

May Sun (born 1954) is a Los Angeles–based artist known primarily for her public art projects. Sun works in the mediums of sculpture, mixed media, photography and installation. Her work has been exhibited nationally and internationally.

She was born in Shanghai, China, moved to Hong Kong at the age of two with her family and immigrated to the United States in 1971 to attend the University of San Diego. "May Sun often refers to aspects of her Chinese heritage in her work, which consistently crosses cultural and political boundaries as well as the boundaries traditionally separating art forms and disciplines."

Her installation "UnderGround" is in the permanent collection of the Museum of Contemporary Art, Los Angeles. Her multi-media installation "L.A./River/China/Town" premiered at the Santa Monica Museum of Art's Art in the Raw series in 1988, and the MOCA-produced radio version of the installation won a Silver Award from the Corporation for Public Broadcasting. Her installation "Fugitive Landing", created at Capp Street Project in San Francisco, moved on to the MIT List Visual Arts Center in 1991 and to the Asia Society Galleries in New York City in 1994. She has won numerous awards and fellowships, including two National Endowment for the Arts Visual Artist's Fellowships and a Getty Fellowship for the Visual Arts.

Sun received her B.A. in Art (Painting/Sculpture/Graphic Arts) from UCLA and attended the MFA program at Otis Art Institute (now Otis College of Art and Design), Los Angeles. She was on the faculty at California Institute of the Arts, and is a visiting artist and lecturer at art schools and colleges nationally.

== Selected exhibitions ==
- Doin' It in Public: Feminism and Art at the Woman's Building, a Pacific Standard Time exhibition, Ben Maltz Gallery, Otis College of Art and Design, Los Angeles, California, 2012.
- Unjustified, curated by Kerry James Marshall, Apex Art, New York, New York, 2002.

== Public art ==
Sun's public art commissions include the Hollywood and Western Red Line Subway Station in Hollywood, CA; Union Station Gateway Center, Los Angeles; City Hall in Culver City; Warner Center, Woodland Hills; San Antonio International Airport, San Antonio, Texas; the Best Friends Animal Society in Mission Hills, Los Angeles; the Rose Kennedy Greenway in Boston, Massachusetts and the Robert F. Kennedy Inspiration Park at the site of the former Ambassador Hotel in Los Angeles. Her installations and public art projects are heavily researched and she draws inspiration from the history and surroundings of the site.

== List of Sun's public commissions ==
- Robert F. Kennedy Inspiration Park, in collaboration with Richard Wyatt. Robert F. Kennedy Community Schools, Ambassador Hotel site. Gonzalez/Goodale Architects (Pasadena, CA) and AHBE Landscape Architects (Los Angeles, CA). Commissioned by the Los Angeles Unified School District. Installed 2010. Received Honor Award from Westside Urban Forum's 2012 Design Awards, 2005.
- Flow (bronze floor inlays), Crown City Center Office Building, Langdon Wilson Architects (Los Angeles, CA). Commissioned by Investment Development Services, Pasadena, California, 2004. Installed 2005.
- Echoes of St. Francis, outdoor sculpture for the Northeast Valley Animal Shelter, Department of Animal Services. Commissioned by the Department of Cultural Affairs, City of Los Angeles, California. Installed 2007.
- Walking the River, San Antonio International Airport Terminal Renovation Project: member of design team with Marmon Mok Associates and Davis, Durand-Hollis, Rupe (San Antonio, TX). Designed terrazzo floor. Commissioned by the City of San Antonio, Texas. Installed 2004. Received American Institute of Architects Certificate of Recognition Award.
- Sky Coyote, outdoor sculpture and integrated artwork for lobby, Warner Center office building, Poliquin Kellogg Design Group (Woodland Hills, CA). Commissioned by Lennar Partners (Irvine, CA), Woodland Hills, California. Installed 2005.
- Chinese Chess Plaza, Central Area Corridor, Central Artery/Tunnel Project, new plaza design for gateway to Chinatown. Commissioned by Massachusetts Highway Department and Massachusetts Turnpike Authority, Boston, Massachusetts. Installed 2007.
- City of Dreams/River of History], east portal, Union Station Gateway Center. Lead Artist, with Richard Wyatt and Ehrenkrantz & Eckstut Architects (Los Angeles, CA). Commissioned by Catellus Development (Los Angeles, CA) and the Metropolitan Transit Authority. Installed 1996.
- La Ballona (outdoor sculpture in reflecting pool), City Hall, Culver City, California. CHCG Architects (Pasadena, CA) Commissioned by the City of Culver City, CA. Installed 1995.
- Listening for the Trains to Come (outdoor fence sculpture), commissioned by the Los Angeles Community Redevelopment Agency, Los Angeles, California. Installed 1993.
- Hollywood Blvd. and Western Ave., Red Line Subway Station. Collaborative station design with Escudero Fribourg Architects (Los Angeles, CA), and specific art elements throughout station. Commissioned by the Los Angeles Metropolitan Transit Authority, Los Angeles, California. Installed 1999.
