= Marian L. Heard =

Marian Langston Heard is a community leader in Boston. She got her associate degree from the University of Bridgeport. She later earned her bachelor's degree from the University of Massachusetts Amherst and her master's degree from Springfield College.

== Career ==
Heard is the president and chief executive of Oxen Hill Partners, a company focused on leadership development. Heard previously worked as president and CEO of the United Way of Massachusetts Bay. She is also the founding president of Points of Light Foundation, which aims to implement President George Bush's call for increased volunteerism in the United States. Heard is on the board of finance and healthcare organizations including CVS Caremark and Sovereign Bank.

== Recognition ==
A college scholarship for high school students participating in United Way was named in her honor. An emergency support fund for students who have contributed to inclusion at Springfield College was also established in her name.

Heard has received the Others Award, the highest civilian award from the Salvation Army, the National Public Citizen of the Year award, the Warren Bennis award for Outstanding Leadership among others for her leadership. Heard was inducted into the National Association of Corporate Directors' Hall of Fame in 2016.

In 2023, she was recognized as one of "Boston’s most admired, beloved, and successful Black Women leaders" by the Black Women Lead project.
