= Circle of Animals/Zodiac Heads =

Artwork by Ai Weiwei

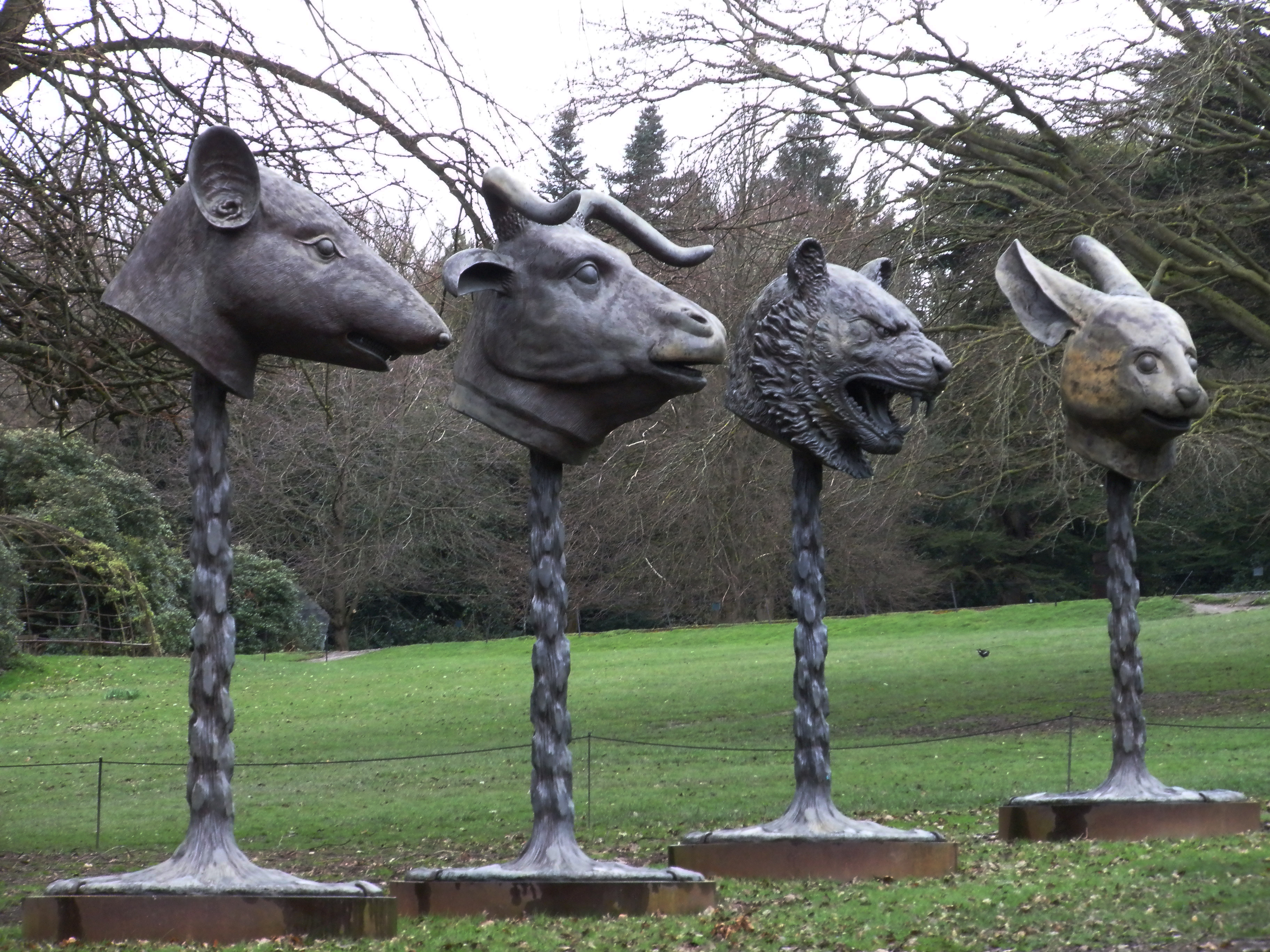
Four of the heads on display

Circle of Animals/Zodiac Heads is an artwork by Chinese contemporary artist and political commentator, Ai Weiwei. The work comes in a small (gold) and large (bronze) version.

Created in 2010, the zodiac heads (a Rat, Ox, Tiger, Rabbit, Dragon, Snake, Horse, Goat, Monkey, Rooster, Dog, and Pig) are inspired by the bronze heads which once comprised a water clock-fountain at the Yuanming Yuan, which is a complex of palaces and gardens in Beijing that were constructed by the Qianlong Emperor of the Qing dynasty. The Yuanming Yuan was eventually destroyed by French and British troops in 1860 during the Second Opium War, at which time the fountainheads were looted. They were originally made by an Italian Jesuit, Giuseppe Castiglione.

In May 2015, Sean Parker paid US$4.4 million at Phillips for the small (gold) version of the 12-sculpture work by Ai Weiwei. In June 2015, a large (bronze) version sold at auction for $5.4 million.

== See also ==
- List of works by Ai Weiwei
